= Oskar Brehm =

German entomologist and naturalist (1823–1850)

Oskar Brehm (12 December 1823 – 8 May 1850) was a German entomologist and naturalist. He was a half-brother of Alfred Brehm. The two were travelling and collecting in Africa when Oskar drowned in the Nile.

== Life ==
Oskar Brehm was born in Renthendorf in 1823 to Christian Ludwig Brehm and his first wife Amalia Wächter who died in 1826. Alfred Brehm was born to Ludwig Brehm and his second wife Bertha Reiz who also raised Oskar. Oskar became keenly interested in insects along with his father and went on hunting and bird study trips from an early age. He went to the village school and at 15 he apprenticed in the pharmacy in Münchenbernsdorf (Thuringia). He collected nearly 1,500 European beetles along with Rector Lübben from Aschersleben. In 1846, he went to study architecture in Dresden and also studied pharmacy at Jena and went to Heinrich Wackenroder's (1798–1854) private pharmaceutical-chemical institute.

== Works ==
He interrupted his studies to join a trip with Baron von Müller to Africa along with his brother. The travel began in September 1847 and the first part ended in December 1848 and Alfred stayed in Egypt. A second part was from February 1850 to October 1851. Oskar joined the second part and was a specialist on the plants and insects. He initially went to Trieste where he met Reinhard Vierthaler (1820–1852) and they travelled together to Alexandria. Oskar has been identified as being particularly interested in insects but a number of later records have been confounded and ascribed to Alfred. When Oskar sent a shipment of pills to his brother, Oskar asked for a beetle in return for each pill. When Oskar joined on the second part of the trip he collected extensively and many of the new species were described by Johann Heinrich Gottfried Apetz. He joined up with Alfred on November 24, 1849, via Smyrna. A nine-member party set off to Sudan in December 1849. When they reached Dongola on May 8, 1850, Alfred and his brother went for a swim in the Nile and Oskar suddenly disappeared. His body was not found until half an hour later and attempts to resuscitate him failed. He was buried in a simple brick monument in the Coptic cemetery at Dongola.
