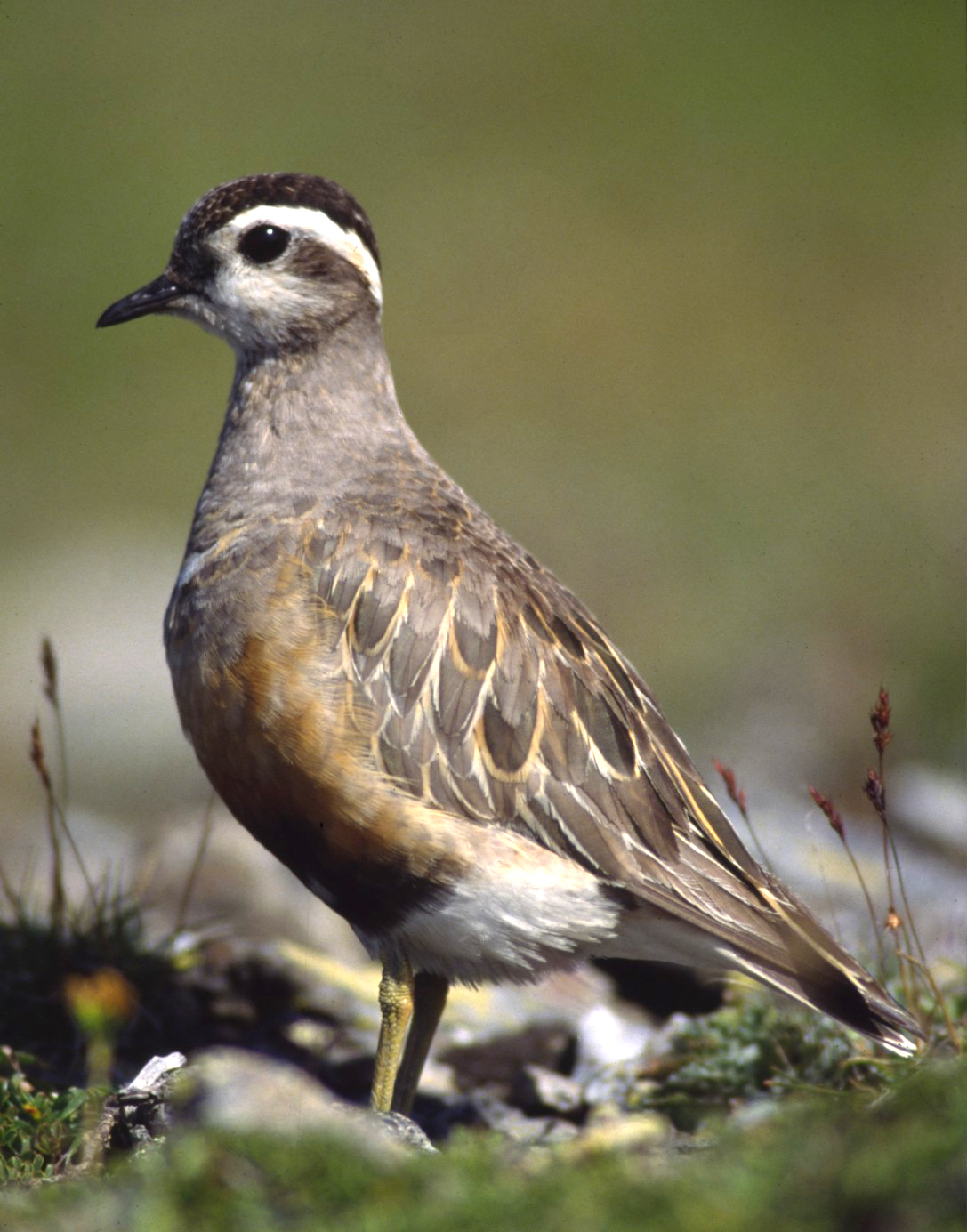

Conservation status
- Least Concern (IUCN 3.1)

Scientific classification
- Kingdom: Animalia
- Phylum: Chordata
- Class: Aves
- Order: Charadriiformes
- Family: Charadriidae
- Genus: Eudromias; Brehm, CL, 1830
- Species: E. morinellus

Binomial name
- Eudromias morinellus (Linnaeus, 1758)
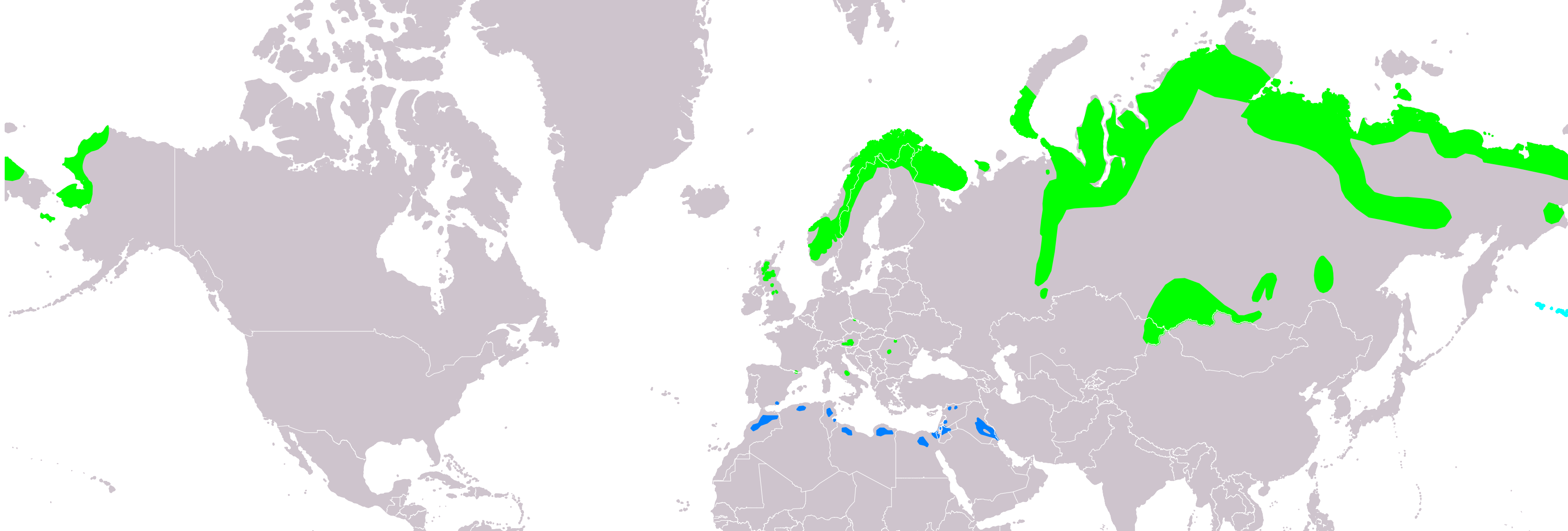
- Range of E. morinellus Breeding Passage Non-breeding

= Eurasian dotterel =

Species of bird

The Eurasian dotterel (Eudromias morinellus), also known in Europe as just dotterel, is a small wader in the plover family of birds. It is the only species placed in the genus Eudromias.

The dotterel is a brown-and-black-streaked bird with a broad, white eye stripe and an orange-red chest band when in breeding plumage. The female is more colourful than the male. The bird is tame and unsuspecting, and the term "dotterel" has been applied contemptuously to mean an old fool.

The Eurasian dotterel is a migratory species, breeding in Northern Europe and Eurosiberia and migrating south to North Africa and the Middle East in the winter. It nests in a bare scrape on the ground and lays two to four eggs. The male does the incubation and rears the chicks, with the female having gone off to find another male and lay another clutch of eggs. It is a common bird with a wide range and the International Union for Conservation of Nature has rated it as being of "least concern".

== Taxonomy and etymology ==
The Eurasian dotterel was formerly described in 1758 by the Swedish naturalist Carl Linnaeus in the tenth edition of his Systema Naturae under the binomial name Charadrius morinellus. The species was moved from Charadrius to the resurrected genus Eudromias when phylogenetic studies found that Charadrius was paraphyletic. The genus Eudromias had been originally introduced in 1830 by the German ornithologist Christian Ludwig Brehm. The genus name Eudromias is Ancient Greek meaning "good runner". The specific morinellus is derived from Ancient Greek moros meaning "foolish", due to the bird's trusting nature.

The English name dates from 1440 when it was used to refer to the bird and also as an insult for someone considered simple or a dotard. Which use is the oldest is unclear, but the link is its tame and unsuspecting nature, which made it easy to catch; its Scottish Gaelic name is amadan-mòintich, "fool of the moors." King James VI and I went every year to Royston, Hertfordshire, to shoot dotterels. It was also easy prey for illegal poaching, which depleted its stocks. It was also prized as a delicacy; in 1534, Queen Anne Boleyn was presented with "a brace of dotterels".

== Description ==
This plover is smaller and more compact than European golden plover (Pluvialis apricaria). It has a striking whitish supercilium in all plumages and has plain wings in flight. Adults in summer are unmistakable, with a chestnut breast bordered above with white, black belly, and warm-brown back. The legs are yellow, and the short bill is black. As with the phalaropes, the female is brighter than the male. Winter birds lack the rich underpart colouration, apart from the white breast line, and are greyer above. Young birds are similar, but have a scaly appearance to their backs. The flight call is a soft pyurr. The female's song is a simple, repetitive whistle.

== Distribution and habitat ==
It breeds in the Arctic tundra of northern Eurosiberia, from Norway to eastern Siberia, and on suitable mountain plateaus such as the Scottish highlands and the Alps. This species is migratory, wintering in a narrow belt across north Africa from Morocco eastwards to Iran. Migration stopovers are traditional, and small parties (trips) of dotterels pass through each year at these usually inland arable or grassy sites. The winter habitat is semi-desert.

== Behaviour and ecology ==
The dotterel's diet is made up of insects and other small invertebrates such as snails, worms, and shellfish. These are obtained by a run-and-pause technique, rather than the steady probing used by other waders.

The male dotterel generally is responsible for incubation and looks after the chicks. In most cases, the cock dotterel successfully prevents other males from getting his mate and fertilizing her eggs. He usually rears chicks that he has fathered and only 4.6% (2/44) of chicks were not the genetic offspring of the caring male, corresponding to 9.1% (2/22) broods affected.

== Status ==
It is a relatively common species with a wide range. Populations seem to be declining slowly, but not alarmingly so, and the International Union for Conservation of Nature has rated it as a "least-concern species". A survey published in 2015 showed a fall in dotterel numbers in Scotland between 1987 and 2011, from 980 to 423 breeding males – representing a decline of 57%. The Eurasian dotterel is one of the species to which the Agreement on the Conservation of African-Eurasian Migratory Waterbirds applies.

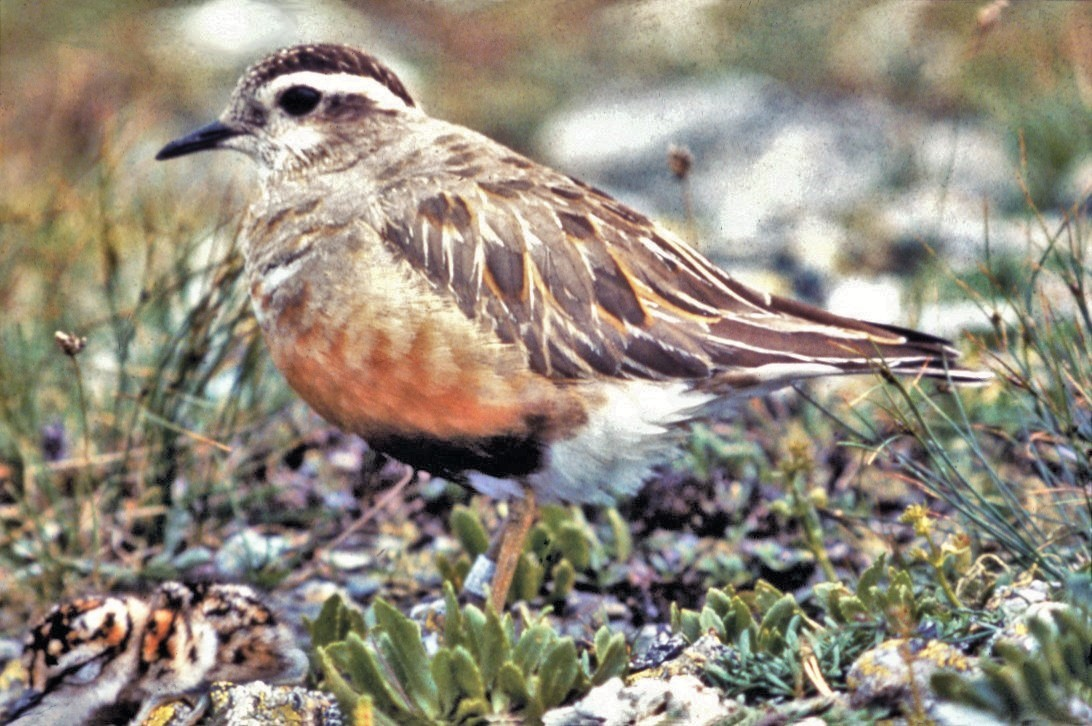
Male with chicks

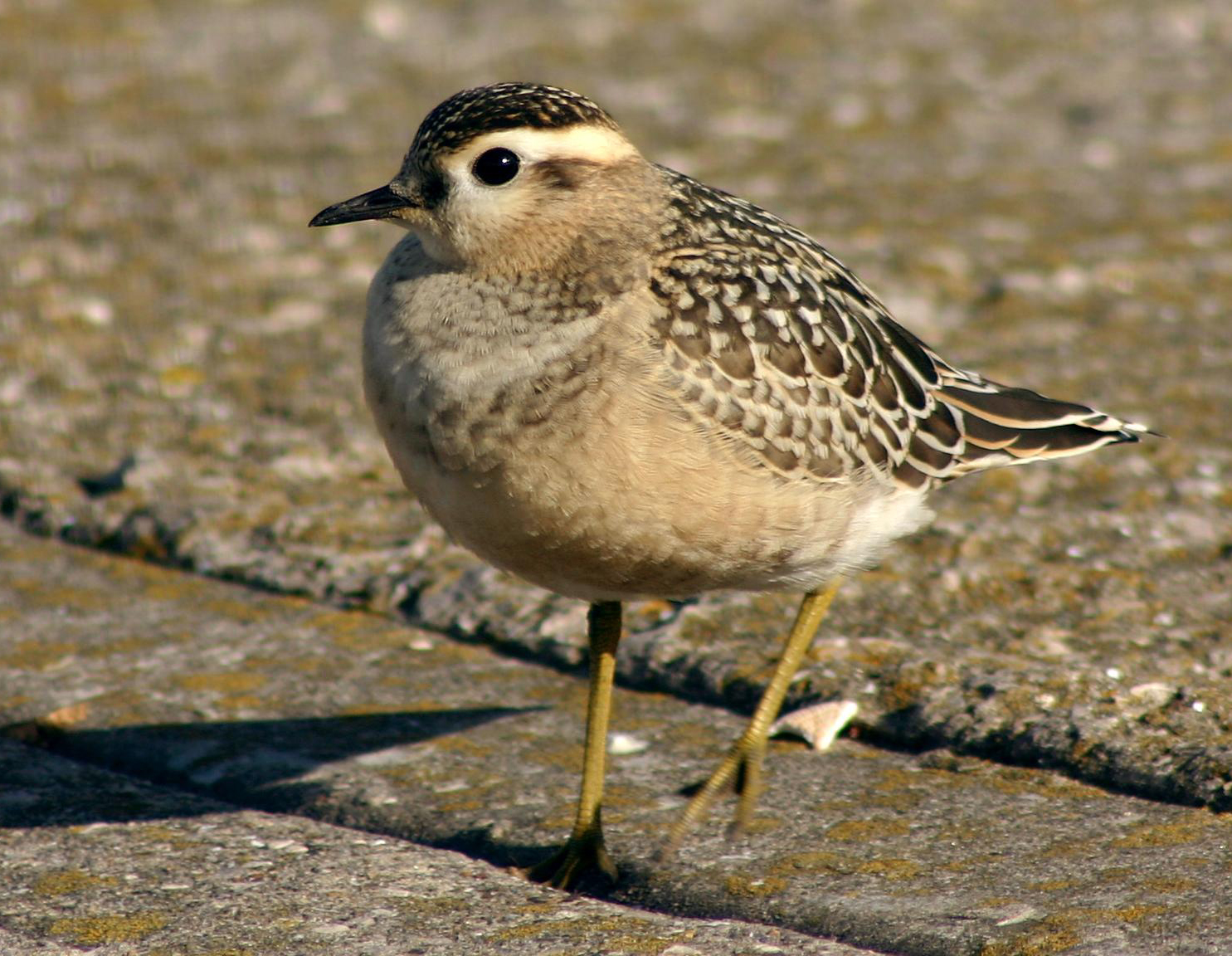
Juvenile

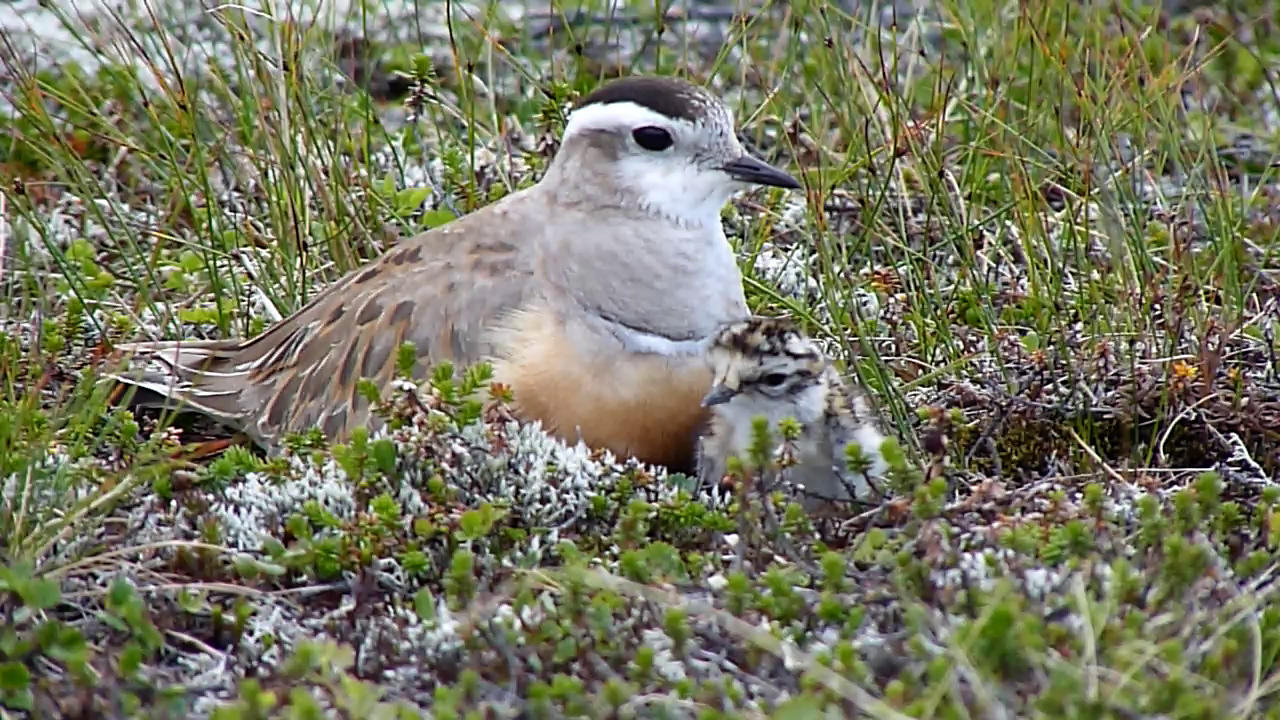
Female with chick - only the fourth record ever

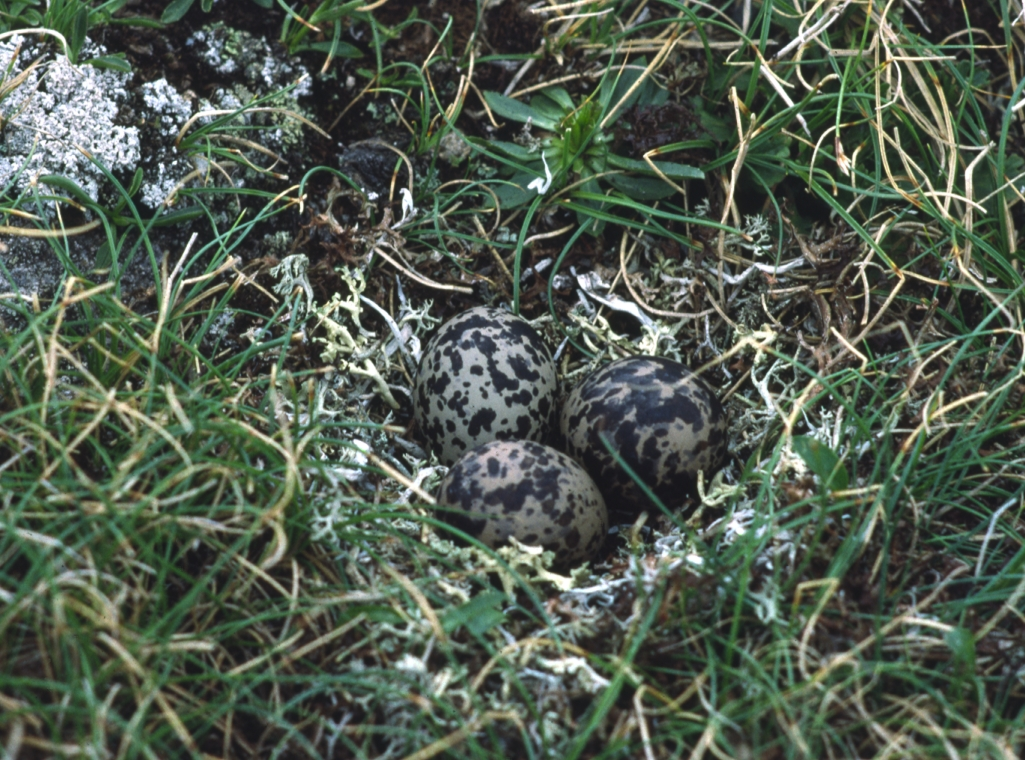
Nest

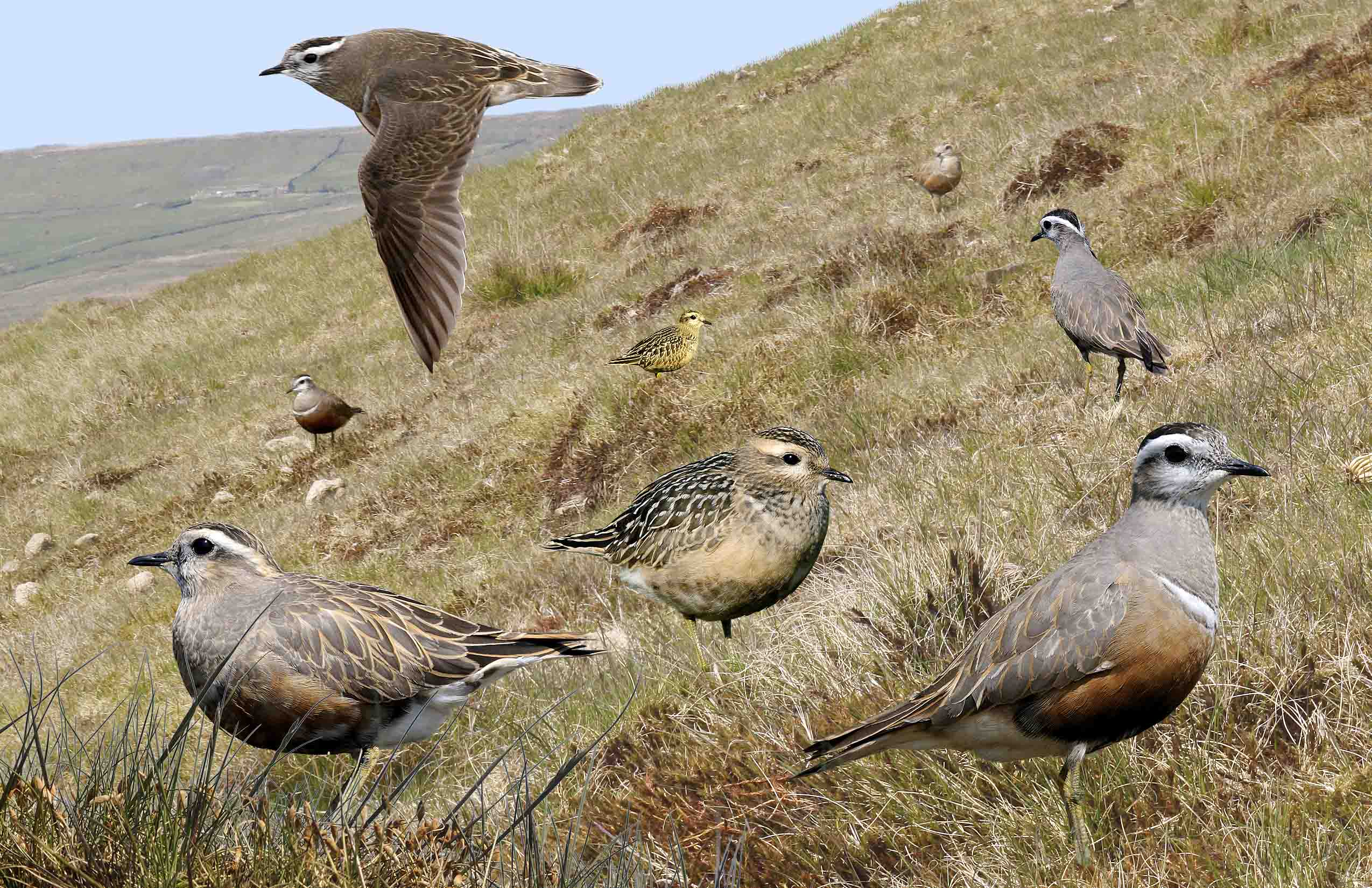
ID composite

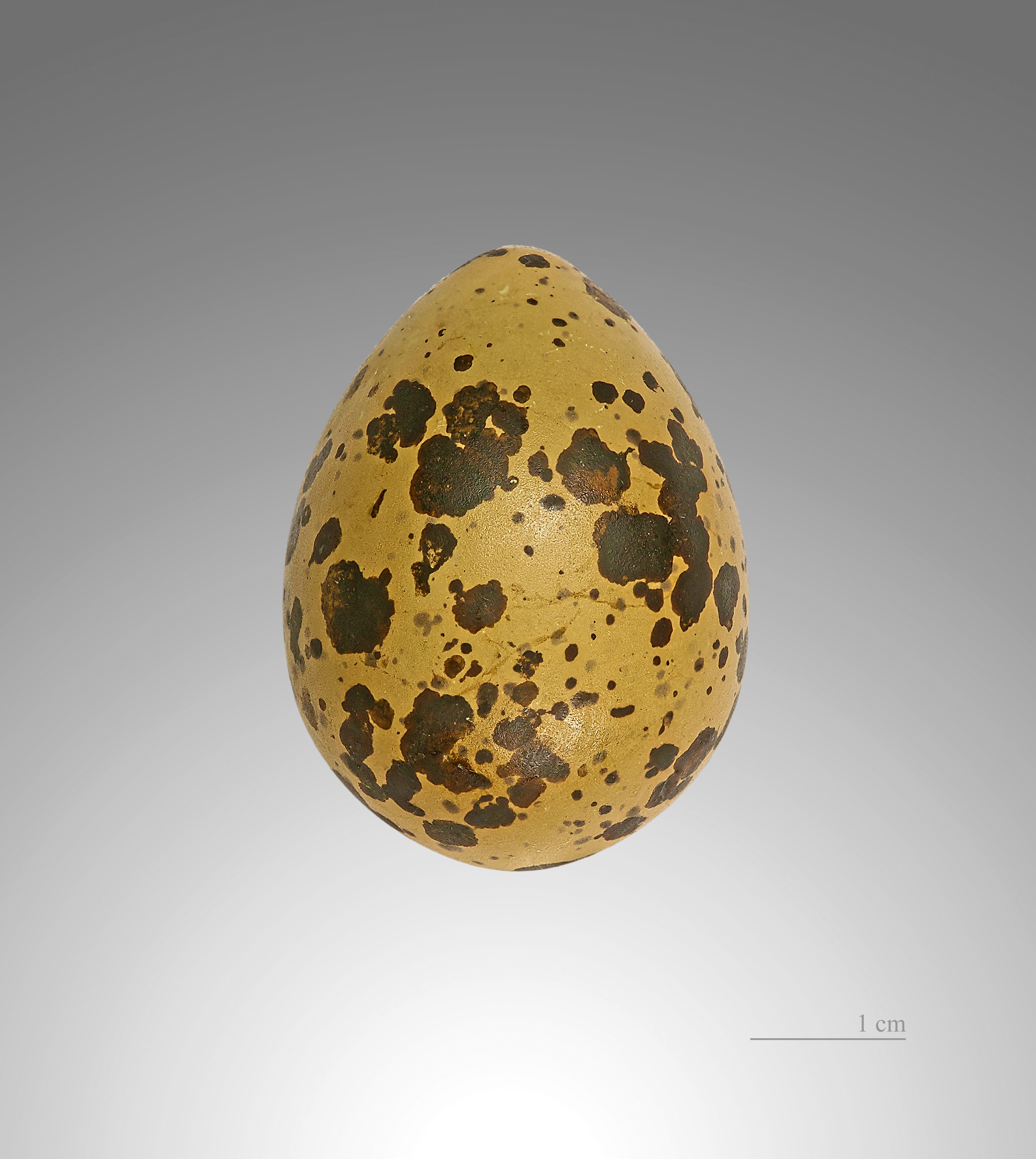
Egg – MHNT
