= Apetz =

Apetz is a German surname. Notable people with the surname include:

- Johann Heinrich Gottfried Apetz (1794–1857), German clergyman, orientalist and naturalist
- Nadine Apetz (born 1986), German swimmer
