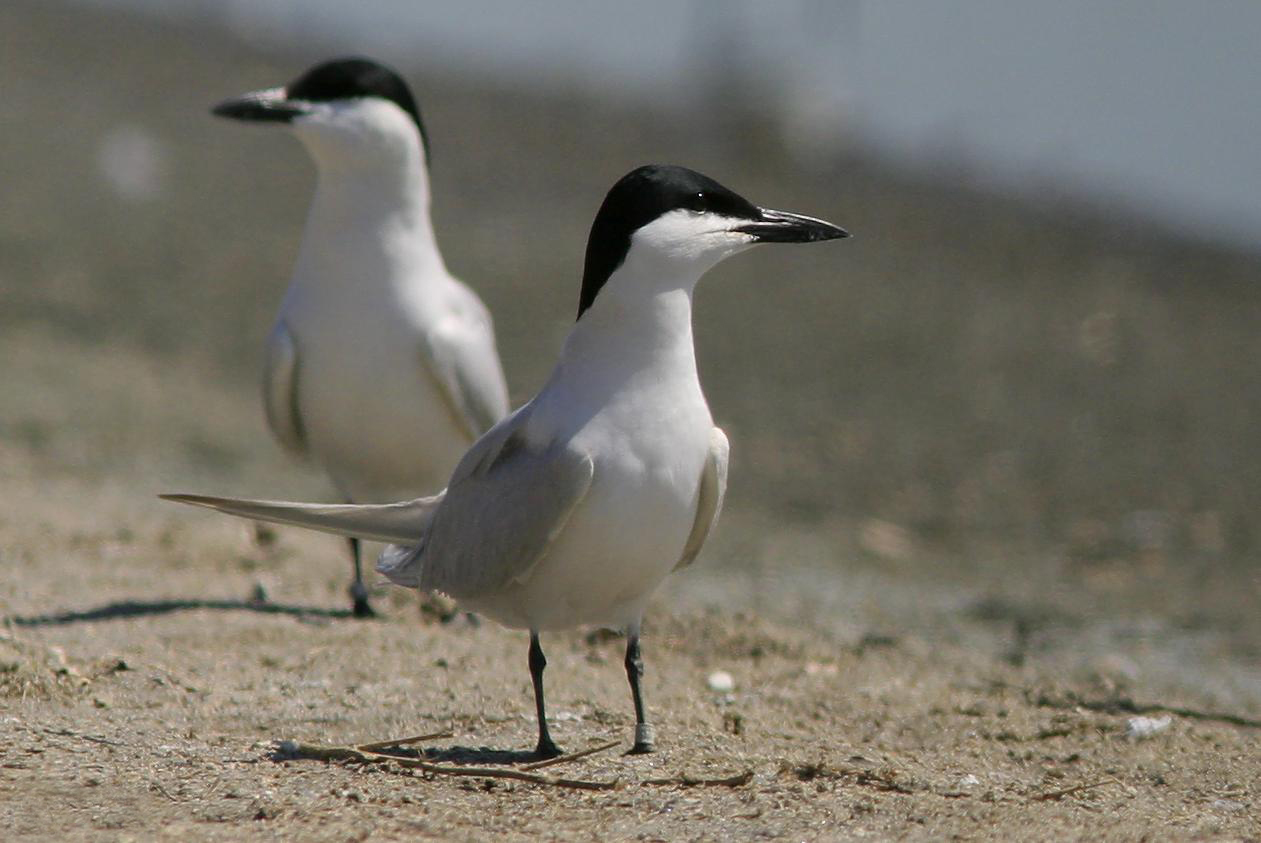

Conservation status
- Least Concern (IUCN 3.1)

Scientific classification
- Kingdom: Animalia
- Phylum: Chordata
- Class: Aves
- Order: Charadriiformes
- Family: Laridae
- Genus: Gelochelidon
- Species: G. nilotica

Binomial name
- Gelochelidon nilotica (Gmelin, JF, 1789)
- Year-round Breeding Nonbreeding

Synonyms
- Sterna nilotica

= Gull-billed tern =

Species of bird

The gull-billed tern (Gelochelidon nilotica) is a tern in the family Laridae. It is widely distributed and breeds in scattered localities in Europe, Asia, northwest Africa, and the Americas. The Australian gull-billed tern was previously considered a subspecies.

== Taxonomy ==
The gull-billed tern was formally described in 1789 by the German naturalist Johann Friedrich Gmelin in his revised and expanded edition of Carl Linnaeus's Systema Naturae. He placed it with terns in the genus Sterna and coined the binomial name Sterna nilotica. Gmelin based his description on the "Egyptian tern" that had been described in 1785 by the English ornithologist John Latham in his book A General Synopsis of Birds. Latham had in turn based his own account on that by the Swedish naturalist Fredrik Hasselquist that was published in 1757. The gull-billed tern was moved to the resurrected genus Gelochelidon based on a molecular phylogenetic study published in 2005. The genus had been introduced in 1830 by the German zoologist Christian Ludwig Brehm. The genus name combines the Ancient Greek gelaō meaning "to laugh" with khelidōn meaning "swallow". The specific epithet nilotica is from Latin niloticus meaning "of the River Nile".

Five subspecies are recognised:

Image	Subspecies	Distribution
	G. n. nilotica (Gmelin, 1789)	nominate, found in Europe, North Africa through the Middle East & south-central Asia to western China & Thailand.
	G. n. affinis (Horsfield, 1821)	found in Transbaikalia to Manchuria, Japan, south and east China through southeast Asia to the Philippines, Borneo, Sulawesi & Sumatra.
	G. n. aranea (Wilson, 1814)	found in eastern & southern United States, Greater Antilles.
	G. n. vanrossemi Bancroft, 1929	found from southern California to northwestern Mexico.
	G. n. gronvoldi Mathews, 1912	found from French Guiana to northeastern Argentina.

== Description ==
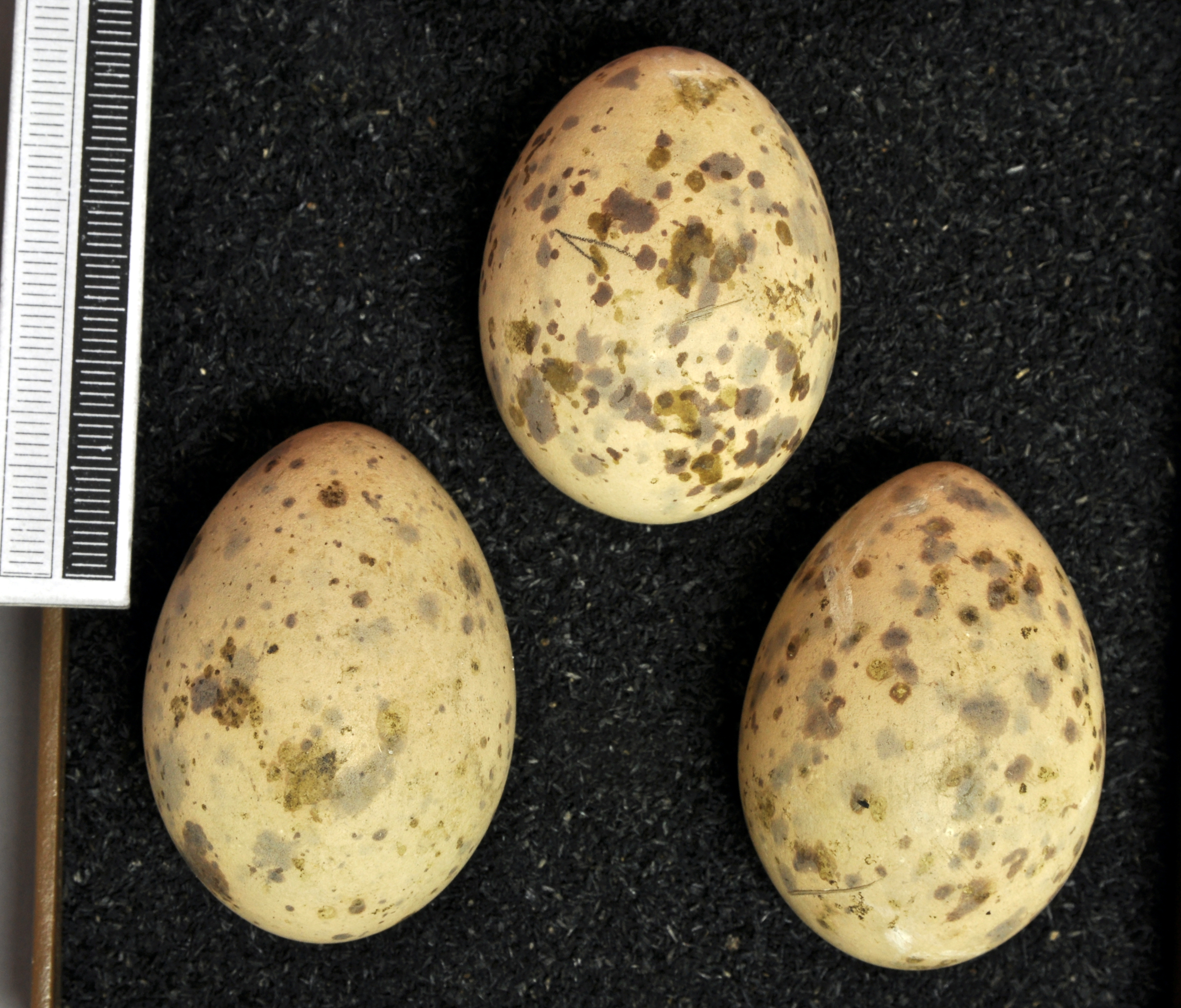
Eggs, Collection Museum Wiesbaden

This is a fairly large and powerful tern, similar in size and general appearance to a Sandwich tern, but the short thick gull-like bill, broad wings, long legs and robust body are distinctive. The summer adult has grey upperparts, white underparts, a black cap, strong black bill and black legs. The call is a characteristic ker-wik. It is 33–42 cm (13–17 in) in length and 76–91 cm (30–36 in) in wingspan. Body mass ranges from 150–292 g (5.3–10.3 oz).

In winter, the cap is lost, and there is a dark patch through the eye like a Forster's tern or a Mediterranean gull. Juvenile gull-billed terns have a fainter mask, but otherwise look much like winter adults.

Juvenile Sandwich terns have a short bill, and are frequently mistaken for gull-billed tern where the latter species is uncommon, such as North Sea coasts.

== Distribution and habitat ==
It breeds in warmer parts of the world in southern Europe, temperate and eastern Asia, both coasts of North America, eastern South America. This bird has a number of geographical races, differing mainly in size and minor plumage details.

All forms show a post-breeding dispersal, but the northern breeders are most migratory, wintering south to Africa, the Caribbean and northern South America, southern Asia and New Zealand.

The gull-billed tern is one of the species to which the Agreement on the Conservation of African-Eurasian Migratory Waterbirds (AEWA) applies.

== Behaviour and ecology ==
=== Breeding ===
The gull-billed tern breeds in colonies on lakes, marshes and coasts (including bays and earthen levees). It nests in a ground scrape and lays two to five eggs. While widely distributed in freshwater areas in Eurasia, it is associated in North America almost solely with saltwater, coastal areas.

=== Food and feeding ===
This is a somewhat atypical tern, in appearance like a Sterna tern, but with feeding habits more like the Chlidonias marsh terns, black tern and white-winged tern. It does not normally plunge dive for fish like the other white terns, and has a broader diet than most other terns. It largely feeds on insects taken in flight, and also often hunts over wet fields and even in brushy areas, to take amphibians and small mammals. It is also an opportunistic feeder, and has been observed to pick up and feed on dead dragonflies from the road.

== Gallery ==
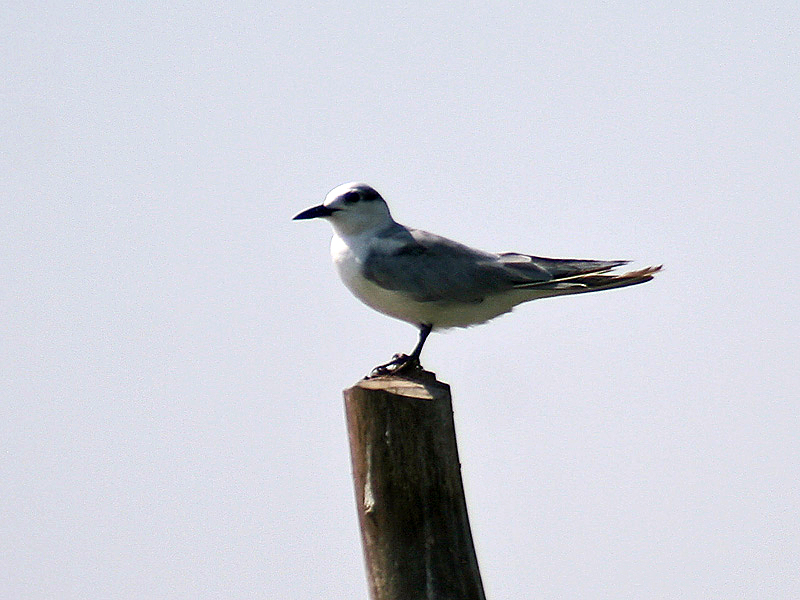
Non-breeding in Chilika, Odisha, India

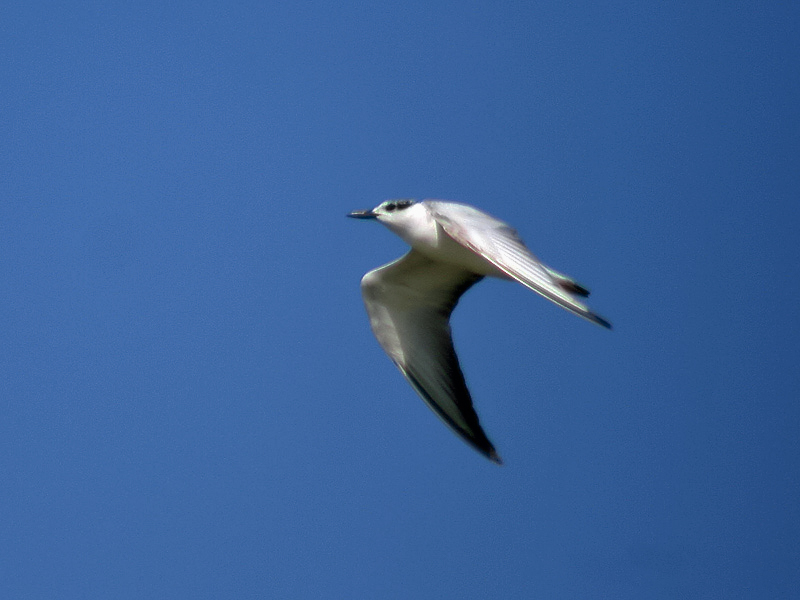
Juvenile, 1st winter in Chilika, Odisha, India

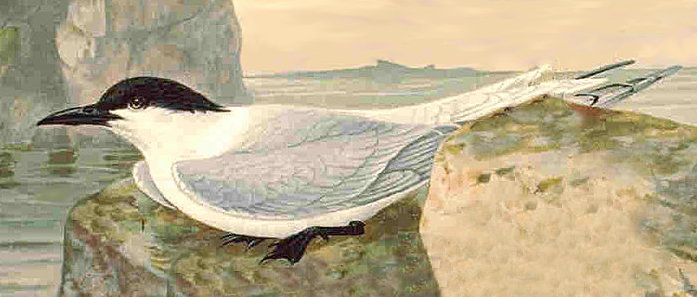

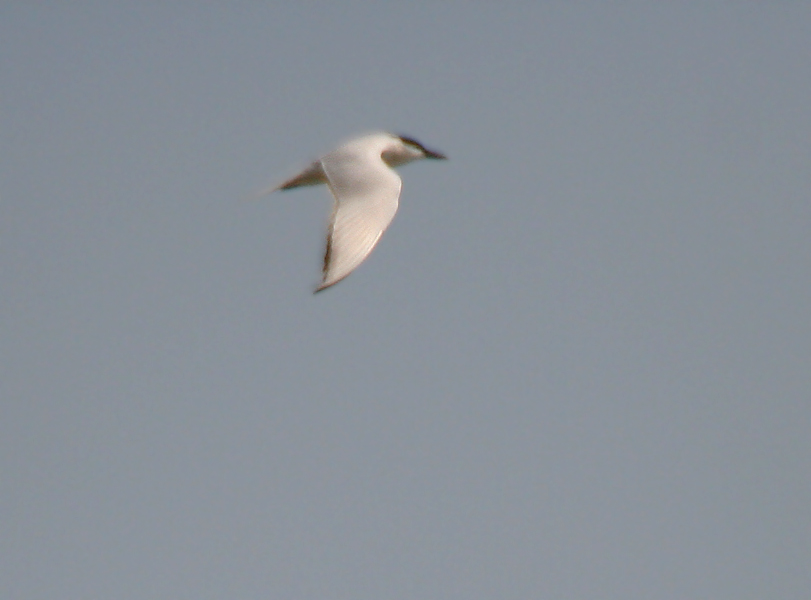
Krishna Wildlife Sanctuary, Andhra Pradesh, India

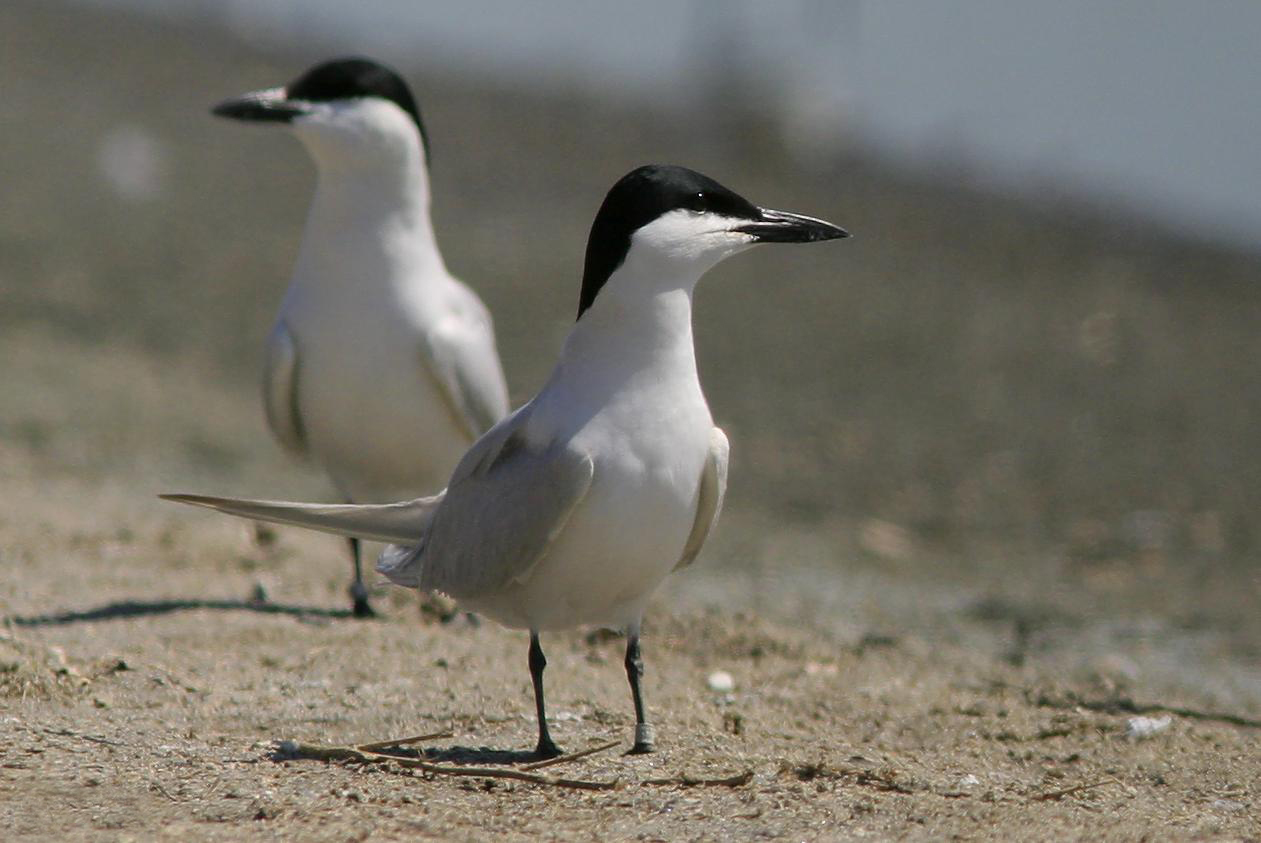
van Rossem's gull-billed terns at the San Diego National Wildlife Refuge

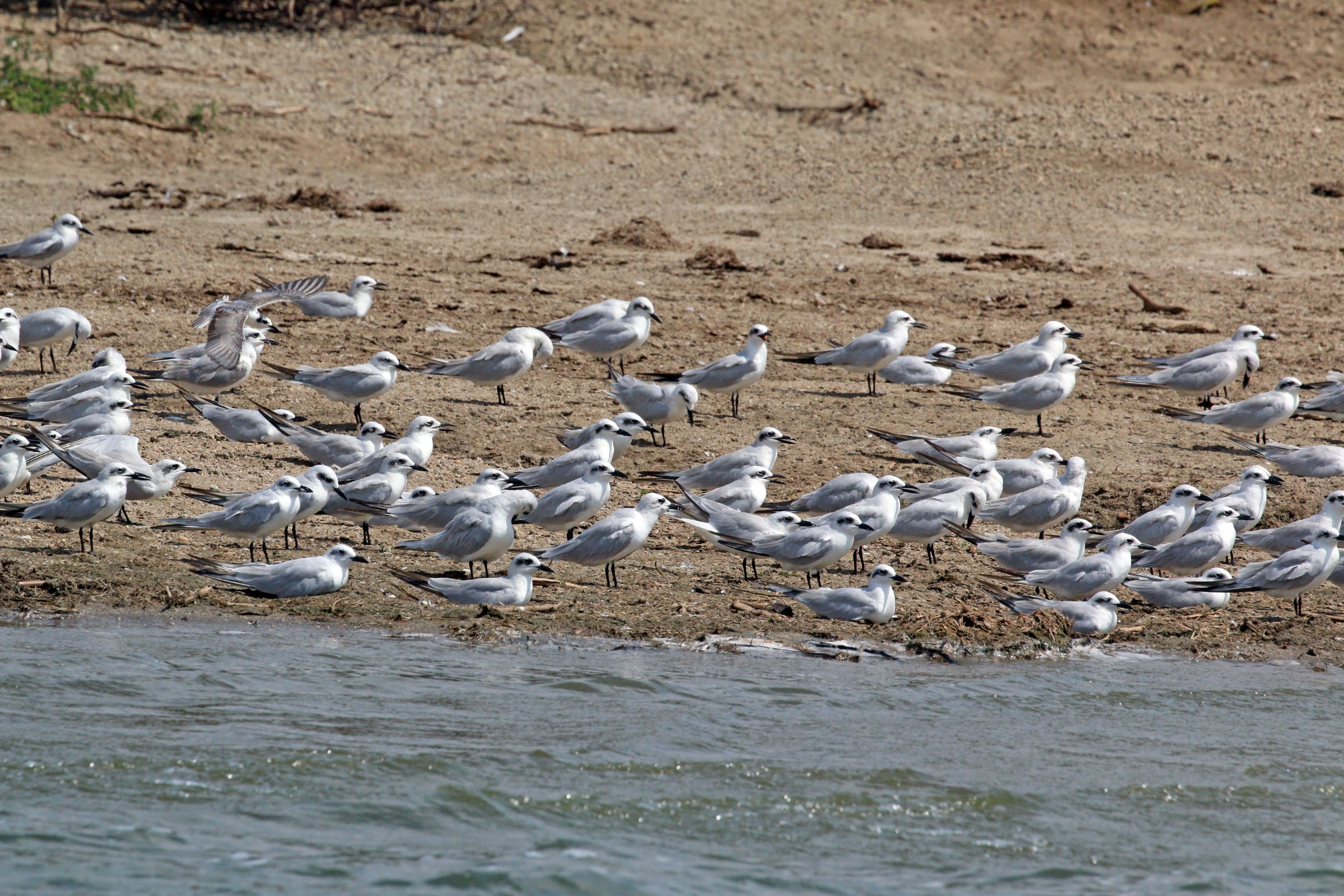
Kazinga Channel, Uganda
