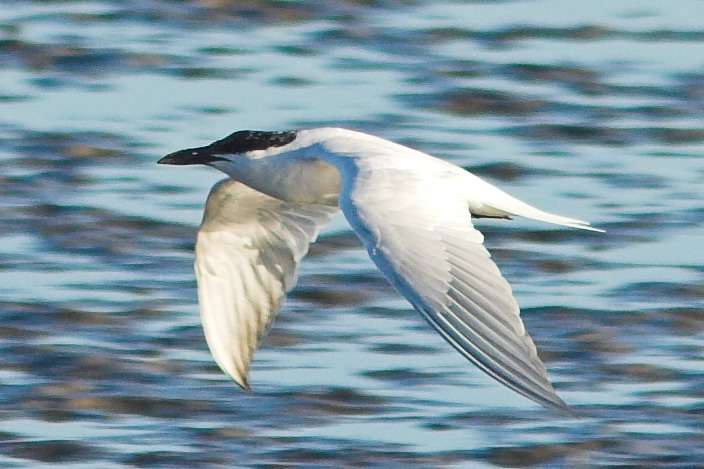
- Australian tern (Gelochelidon macrotarsa)

Scientific classification
- Kingdom: Animalia
- Phylum: Chordata
- Class: Aves
- Order: Charadriiformes
- Family: Laridae
- Subfamily: Sterninae
- Genus: Gelochelidon; Brehm, CL, 1830

Type species
- Gelochelidon meridionalis = Sterna nilotica Brehm, 1830

Species
- See text

= Gelochelidon =

Genus of birds

Gelochelidon is a genus of terns. It was considered a monotypic genus until the Australian tern was split from the gull-billed tern.

== Taxonomy ==
The genus Gelochelidon was introduced in 1830 by the German zoologist Christian Ludwig Brehm. The type species is the gull-billed tern. The name combines the Ancient Greek gelaō meaning "to laugh" with khelidōn meaning "swallow".

The genus contains 2 species:

Genus Gelochelidon – Brehm, CL, 1830 – two species
Common name	Scientific name and subspecies	Range	Size and ecology	IUCN status and estimated population
Gull-billed tern	Gelochelidon nilotica (Gmelin, JF, 1789) Five subspecies: G. n. nilotica (Gmelin, 1789); G. n. affinis (Horsfield, 1821); G. n. aranea (Wilson, 1814); G. n. gronvoldi Mathews, 1912	southern Europe, temperate and eastern Asia, both coasts of North America, eastern South America.	Size: Habitat: Diet:	LC
Australian tern	Gelochelidon macrotarsa (Gould, 1837)	Australia and New Guinea.	Size: Habitat: Diet:	LC
