= Baedeker (surname) =

Baedeker is a German surname. Notable people with the surname include:

- Karl Baedeker (1801–1859), German publisher
- Karl Baedeker (scientist) (1877–1914), German physicist
- F. W. J. Baedeker (1788–1865), German pharmacist, collector of bird eggs, and a bird illustrator

== See also ==
- Baedeker
- Baedeker Blitz
