= Brehms Tierleben =

1860s zoological book by Alfred Brehm

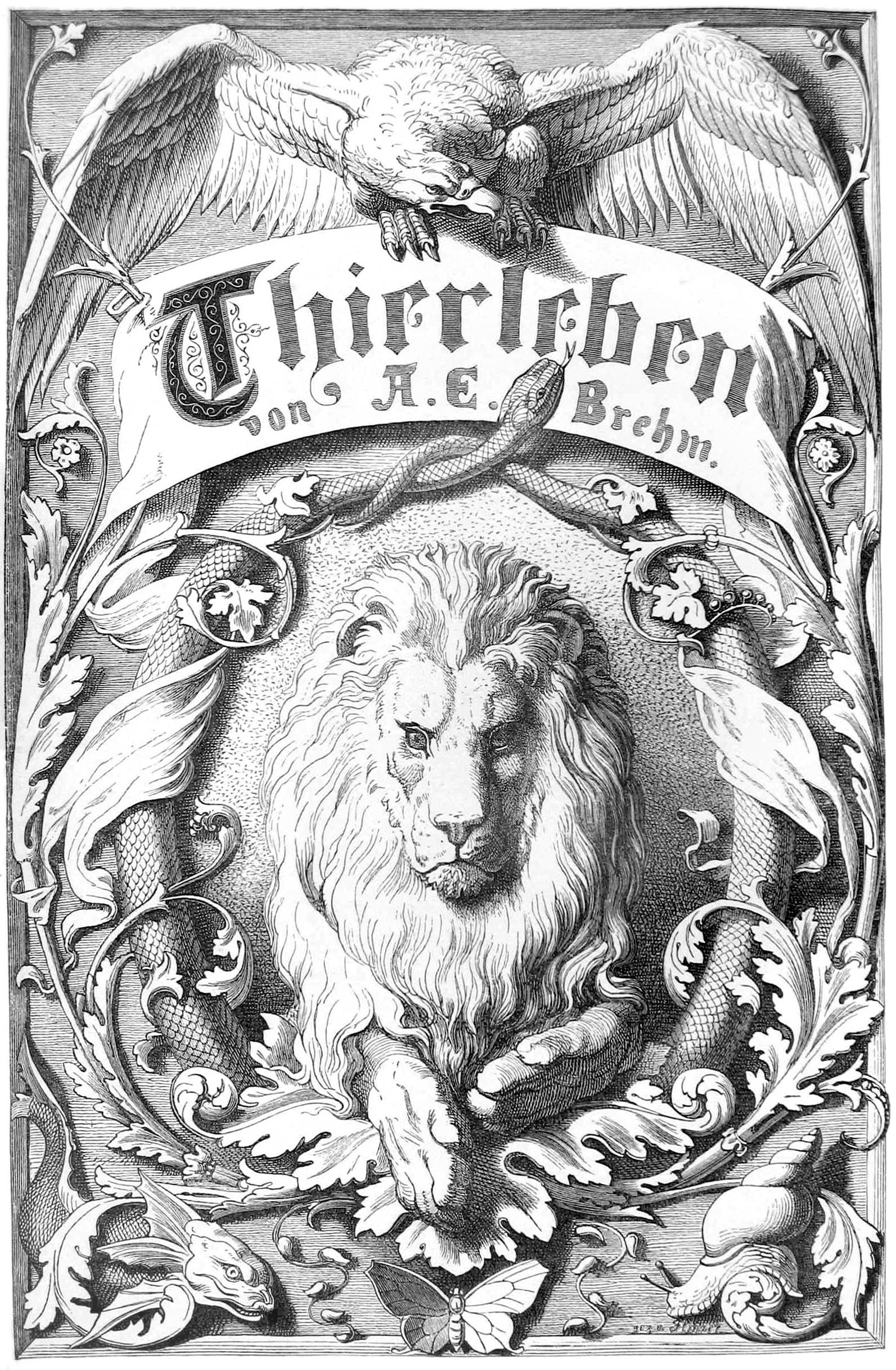
- Fontispiece from a reprint volume of the second edition
- Illustrator: Fedor Flinzer
- Language: Multiple
- Subject: Zoology
- Media type: Print

Brehms Tierleben (English title: Brehm's Animal Life) is a scientific reference book, first published in the 1860s by Alfred Edmund Brehm (1829–1884). It was one of the first modern popular zoological treatises. First published in German as a six volume work that was completed in 1869 it was published by the Bibliographisches Institut of Herrmann Julius Meyer with illustration directed by Robert Kretschmer. The second edition, completed in 1879 had ten volumes. It was translated into several European languages.

== Publishing history ==
As a freelance writer, Brehm furnished popular-scientific magazines with essays and travelogues. Because of his success in doing this, in 1860 he was commissioned to write a six-volume zoological encyclopedia. Journeys to Abyssinia, Scandinavia and Siberia both interrupted and enriched the work. The first six volumes of the encyclopedia, published under the title Illustrirtes Thierleben, appeared from 1864 to 1869, published by the Bibliographisches Institut under Herrmann Julius Meyer. Illustrated under the direction of Robert Kretschmer (1818–1872), they met with wide approval from the educated bourgeoisie.

As of the second edition, which consisted of ten volumes published from 1876 to 1879, the work was already titled Brehms Tierleben. The work made Brehm famous around the world and its title is still a catchphrase today, even though science has gone far beyond Brehm. Perhaps the greatest change in the second edition was the addition of new illustrations by Gustav Mützel, the brothers August and Friedrich Specht and others, which Charles Darwin said were the best he had ever seen. The second edition was reprinted from 1882 to 1884, and a third edition, published from 1890 to 1893, followed. The work has been translated into various languages and remained very popular for generations. Editions continued to appear into the second half of the 20th century, sometimes in the form of abridged, one-volume works.

== Note on the title ==
The title was at its time written "Brehms Thierleben" (or respectively, "Illustrirtes Thierleben"), and is in Germany usually still cited in that way. The spelling reform of 1901 did away with the exception of writing "Thier" with th, which never means the English th sound in this context. (Similarly, the adjective in the original title would now be written "illustriertes".)

== Selected editions ==
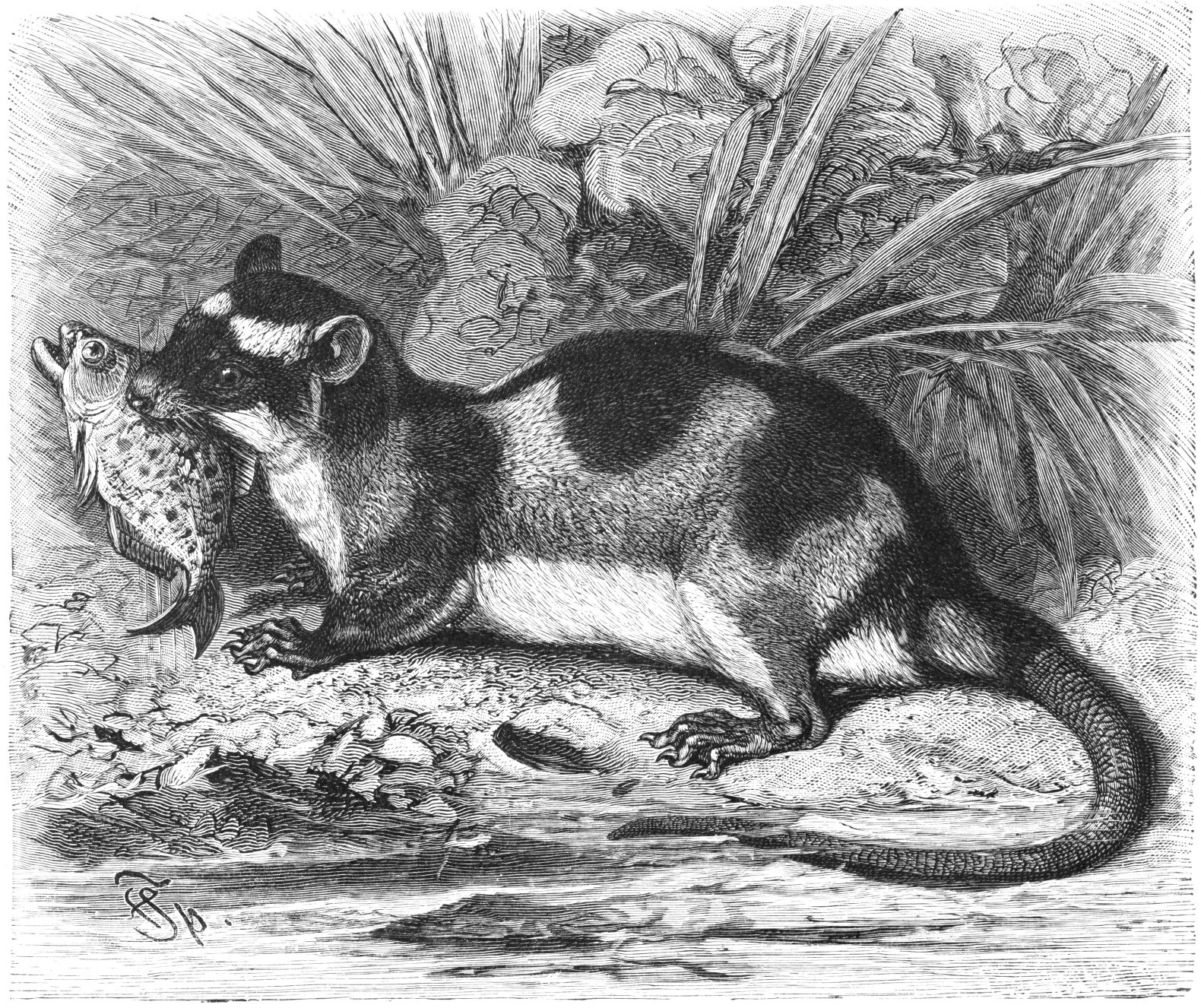
A Chironectes minimus sketch from Brehms Tierleben

- Illustrirtes Thierleben. Eine allgemeine Kunde des Thierreichs. By Alfred Edmund Brehm, Eduard Oskar Schmidt, and Ernst Ludwig Taschenberg. 6 vols. Hildburghausen, Bibliographisches Institut, 1864–1869.
- Brehms Tierleben. Allgemeine Kunde des Tierreichs. By Alfred Edmund Brehm, Eduard Oskar Schmidt, and Ernst Ludwig Taschenberg. 2nd, expanded, ed. 10 vols. Leipzig, Bibliographisches Institut, 1876–1879; reprinted 1882–1884.
- Brehms Tierleben. Allgemeine Kunde des Tierreichs. By Alfred Edmund Brehm, Oskar Boettger, Wilhelm Haacke, Eduard Pechuël-Loesche, W. Marshall, Eduard Oskar Schmidt, and Ernst Ludwig Taschenberg. 3rd ed. 10 vols. Leipzig, Wien, Bibliographisches Institut, 1890–1893.

== Editions on line ==
- Biodiversity Heritage Library (2nd edition)
- Wikisource: Brehms Thierleben (German) Partial text of the 2nd German edition.
- Brehms Thierleben, 1. German edition digitized in the Virtual Laboratory of the Max-Planck-Institut für Wissenschaftsgeschichte
- Djurens lif (Swedish) 2nd ed. of the Swedish translation of Thierleben, 4 vols. (pub. 1882–1888); from Project Runeberg .
- Project Gutenberg-DE page on Brehm (German) Includes text from Brehms Thierleben and Tiergeschichten.
- Page on Brehm (German) Includes text from Brehms Tierleben.
