= Friedrich Specht =

German painter and illustrator

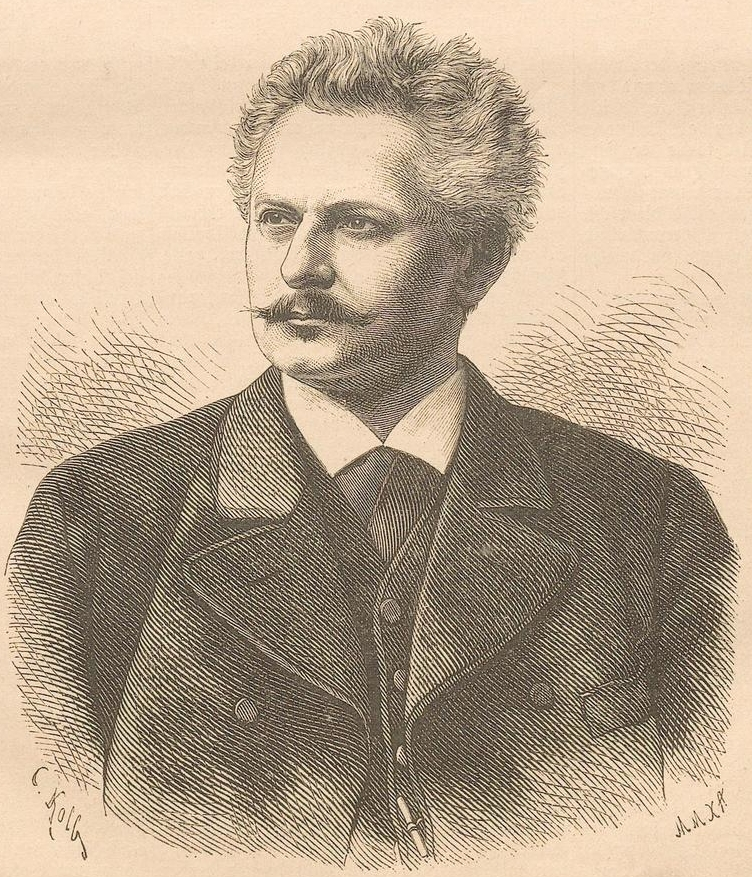
Friedrich Specht by C. Kolb

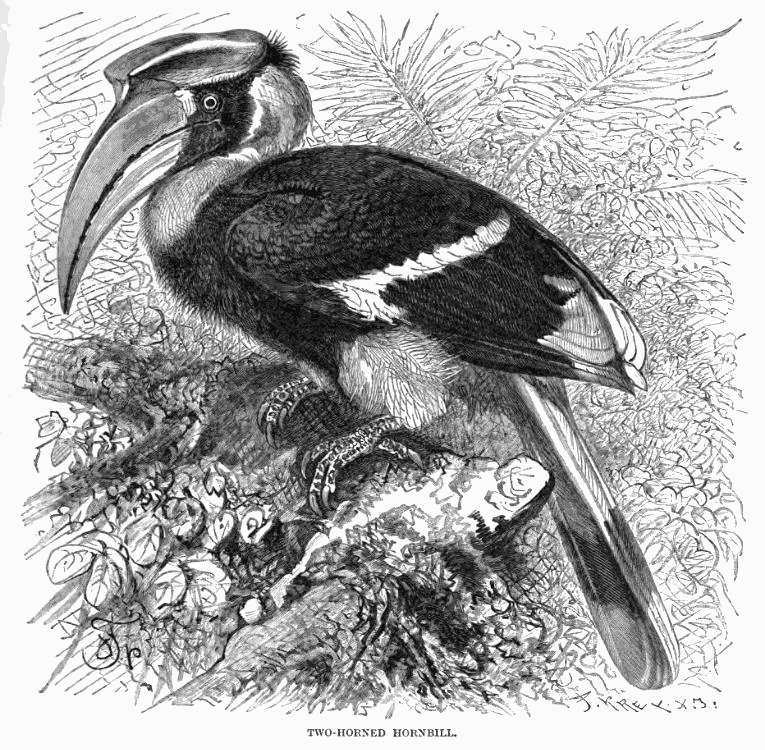
Great hornbill

Friedrich Specht (6 May 1839 – 12 June 1909) was a German painter and natural history illustrator.

== Biography ==
Specht was born in Lauffen am Neckar. He held his first exhibition at the Stuttgart Art Academy. He provided illustrations of animals and landscapes for a large number of zoology and veterinary science publications, notably for the first edition of Brehms Tierleben (1864–69) conceived by Alfred Edmund Brehm, Brockhaus and Efron Encyclopedic Dictionary (1890—1907), Carl Vogt's Die Säugetiere in Wort und Bild (1883–89) and Richard Lydekker's Royal Natural History (1894–96). His brothers were the wood engraver Carl Gottlob Specht and the wildlife painter August Specht (1849–1923).

He was responsible for the lion's head on Adolf Gnauth's memorial to the fallen warriors of Stuttgart. He died in Stuttgart.
