= Gustav Mützel =

German painter

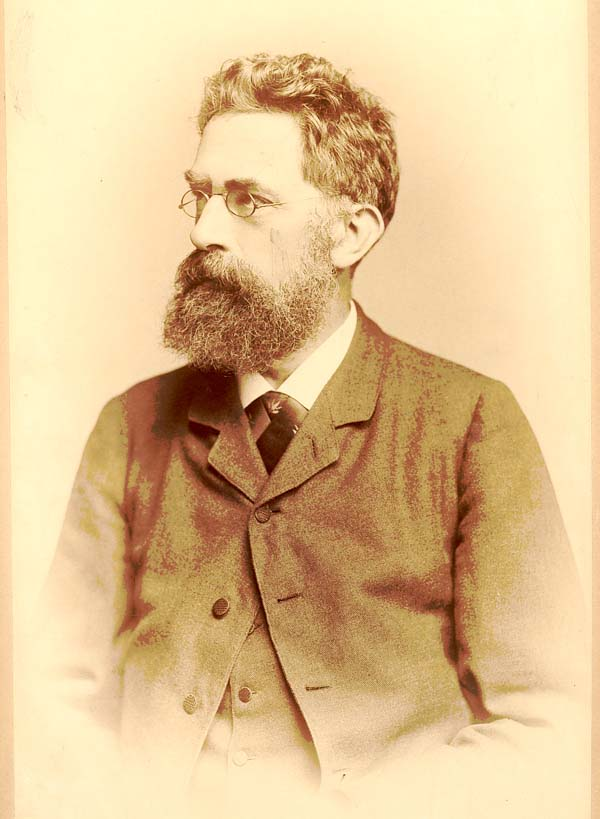
Gustav Mützel

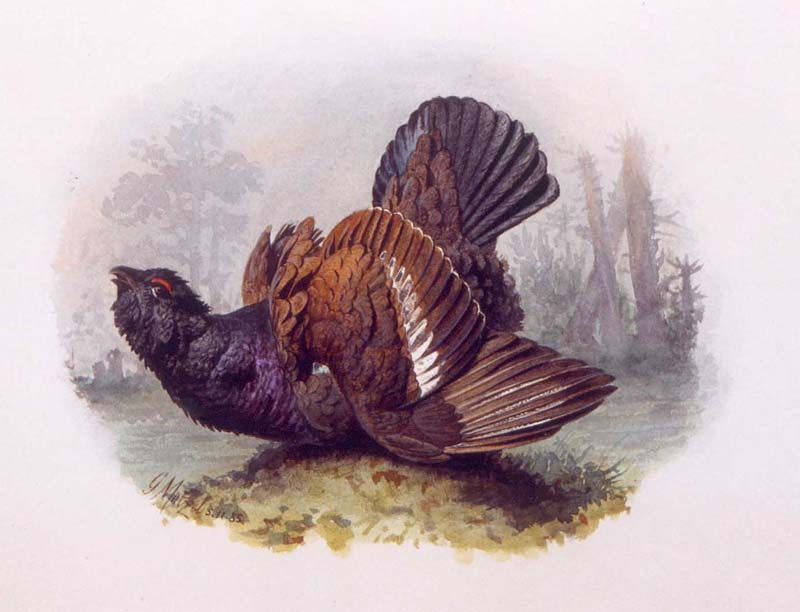
Auerhahn by Mützel

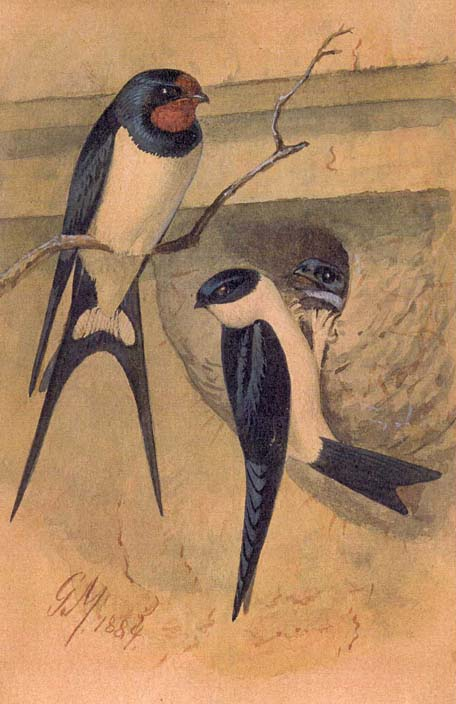
Schwalben by Mützel

Gustav Ludwig Heinrich Mützel (December 7, 1839 – October 29, 1893) was a German artist, famous for his mammal and bird paintings, including the illustrations for the second edition of Alfred Edmund Brehm's Thierleben and Richard Lydekker's The Royal Natural History.

Gustav Mützel was the son of the painter Heinrich Mützel and his wife Luise Pauline Friedrichs. He attended the French high school in his hometown. Subsequently, Mützel began to study at the Academy of Art at age 18 and was, amongst others, a pupil of the painter Eduard Daege.

On 1 November 1865 Mützel married Anna Schönherr in Berlin and raised three children; Hans, Walter and Gertrud. Mützel and his wife settled in Königsberg in the Neumark, where he was active as a photographer. To keep up with the latest technical developments in photography Mützel and his family moved to Berlin in 1870.

After the Franco-German War Mützel started illustrating some of the more important encyclopedias of the time. He created a large number of illustrations for the German Ornithological Society, having been a member since 1874. Mützel's diverse interests also led to his membership of the German Society for Anthropology, Ethnology and Prehistory and the Association of Berlin Artists. The Nießen'sche Choral Society awarded him an honorary membership.

Gustav Mützel died at his home (Hagelsberger Str. 10) at the age of 54 years on 29 October 1893 of heart and kidney ailments. He was interred at the cemetery in Mariendorf on 1 November.

== Illustrated works ==
- Alfred Brehm: Brehm's Thierleben
- Alfred Brehm: Vom Nordpol zum Äquator
- Brockhaus Konversationslexikon
- Friedrich Lichterfeld: Illustrirte Tierbilder. Schilderungen und Studien nach dem Leben
- Adolf Bernhard Meyer (Hrsg.): Unser Auer-, Rackel- und Birkwild und seine Abarten
- Joseph Meyer: Meyers Konversations-Lexikon
- Heinrich Nehrling: Die Nordamerikanische Vogelwelt
- Theodor D. Pleske: Ornithographia rossica („Die Vogelfauna des russischen Reiches“)
- Nikolai Michailowitsch Przewalski: Wissenschaftliche Resultate der von N. M. Przewalski nach Central-Asien unternommenen Reisen (2 Bde.)
- Friedrich Ratzel: Völkerkunde
- Anton Reichenow: Vogelbilder aus fernen Zonen
- Emil Adolf Roßmäßler: Das Süßwasseraquarium. Eine Anleitun und Pflege desselben
- Richard Schmid-Cabanis: Zoolyrische Ergüsse. Ein Album zwei-, vier- und mehrfüssiger Dichtungen
- Georg Schweinfurth: Im Herzen von Afrika. Reisen und Entdeckungen im zentralen Äquatorial-Afrika während der Jahre 1868-1871
