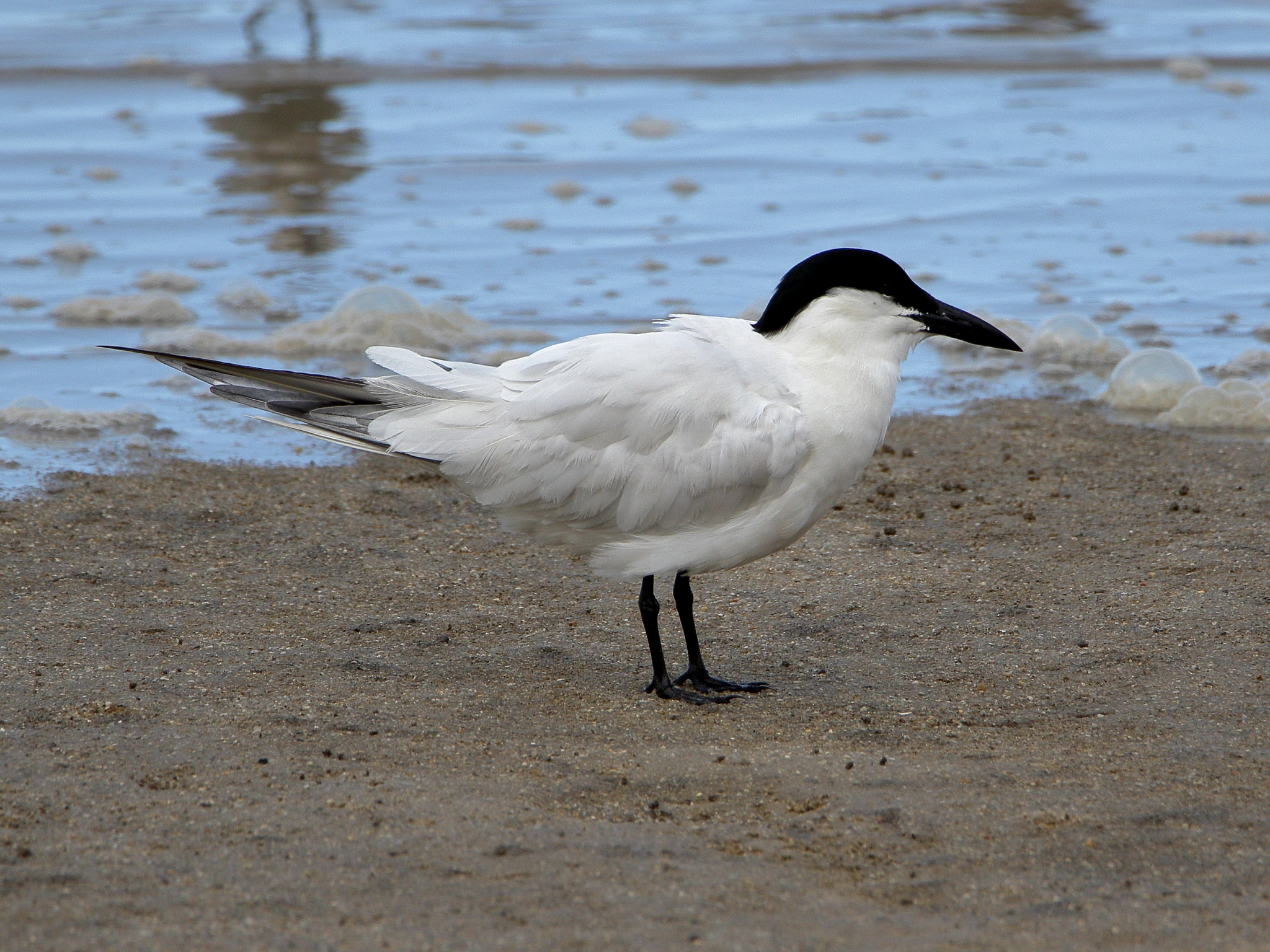
- Australian tern at Cairns, Queensland

Conservation status
- Least Concern (IUCN 3.1)

Scientific classification
- Kingdom: Animalia
- Phylum: Chordata
- Class: Aves
- Order: Charadriiformes
- Family: Laridae
- Genus: Gelochelidon
- Species: G. macrotarsa

Binomial name
- Gelochelidon macrotarsa (Gould, 1837)

= Australian tern =

Species of bird

The Australian tern or Australian gull-billed tern (Gelochelidon macrotarsa) is a tern in the family Laridae, native to Australia. The genus name is from Ancient Greek gelao, "to laugh", and khelidon, "swallow".

== Taxonomy ==
John Gould described Sterna macrotarsa from a specimen held at King's College, London in 1837. Although first described as a species, throughout most of the 20th and early 21st centuries it was generally considered to be a subspecies of the gull-billed tern, but was re-elevated to species status by the IOC World Bird List in 2019 in its Version 9.2.

== Description ==
This is a fairly large and powerful tern, similar in size and general appearance to a Sandwich tern, but the short thick gull-like bill, broad wings, long legs and robust body are distinctive. The summer adult has pale grey upperparts, white underparts, a black cap, strong black bill and black legs. The call is a characteristic ker-wik. It is 33–42 cm (13–17 in) in length and 76–91 cm (30–36 in) in wingspan. Its weight ranges from 150–292 g (5.3–10.3 oz). It differs from the closely related gull-billed tern in being slightly larger, paler grey above, and with an obviously larger, heavier bill.

In winter, the cap is lost, and there is a dark patch through the eye like a Forster's tern or a Mediterranean gull. Juvenile Australian terns have a fainter mask, but otherwise look much like winter adults.

== Range ==
It breeds in Australia, with some also reaching New Guinea in the non-breeding season.

== Life history ==
This species breeds in colonies on lakes, marshes and coasts. It nests in a ground scrape and lays two to five eggs.

This is a somewhat atypical tern, in appearance like a Sterna tern, but with feeding habits more like the Chlidonias marsh terns, black tern and white-winged tern.

The Australian tern does not normally plunge dive for fish like the other white terns, and has a broader diet than most other terns. It largely feeds on insects taken in flight, and also often hunts over wet fields and even in brushy areas, to take amphibians and small mammals. It is also an opportunistic feeder, and has been observed to pick up and feed on dead dragonflies from the road.

== Gallery ==
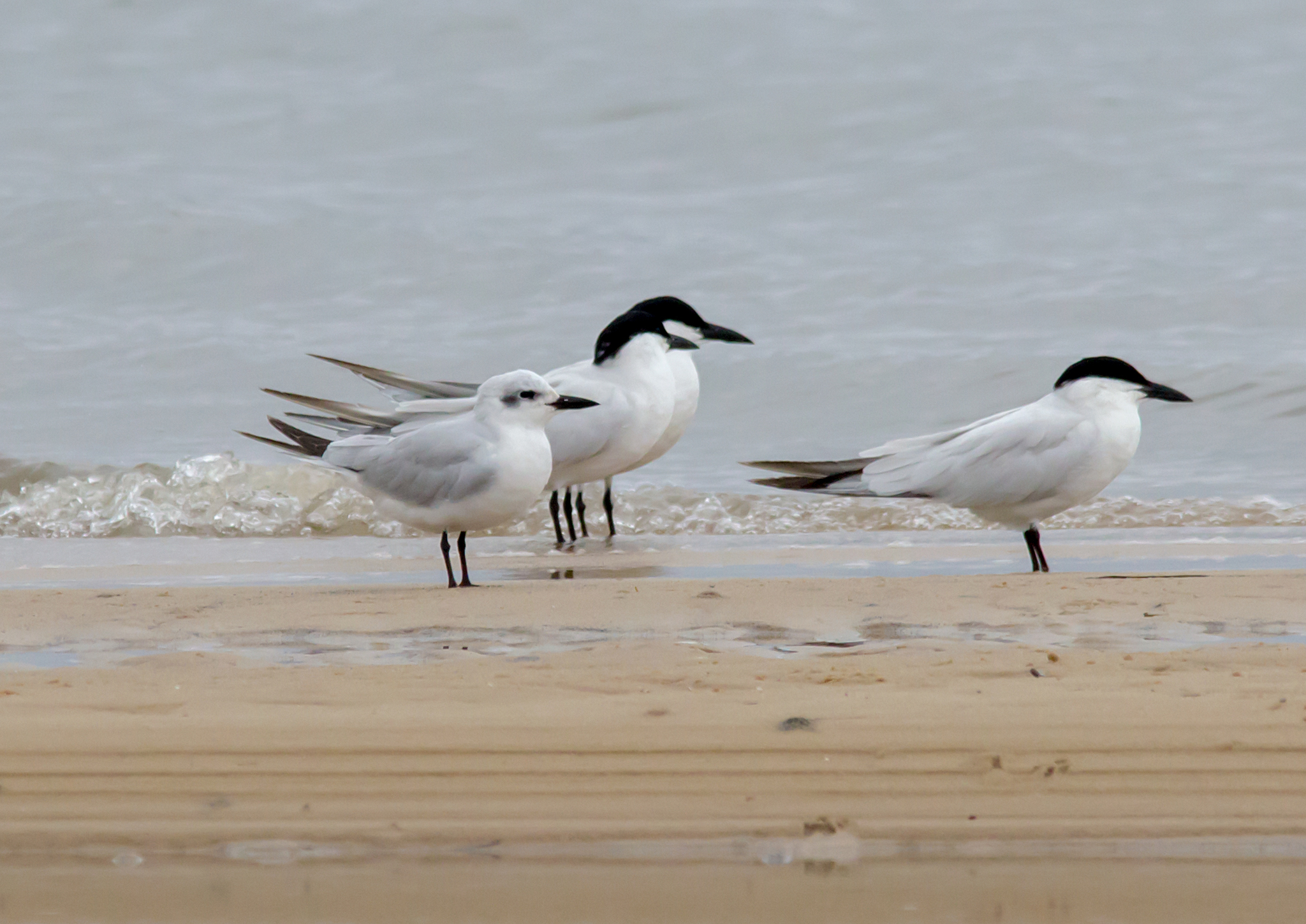
Three Australian terns, all in breeding plumage, with a winter plumage gull-billed tern, at Jam Jerrup, Victoria, Australia.

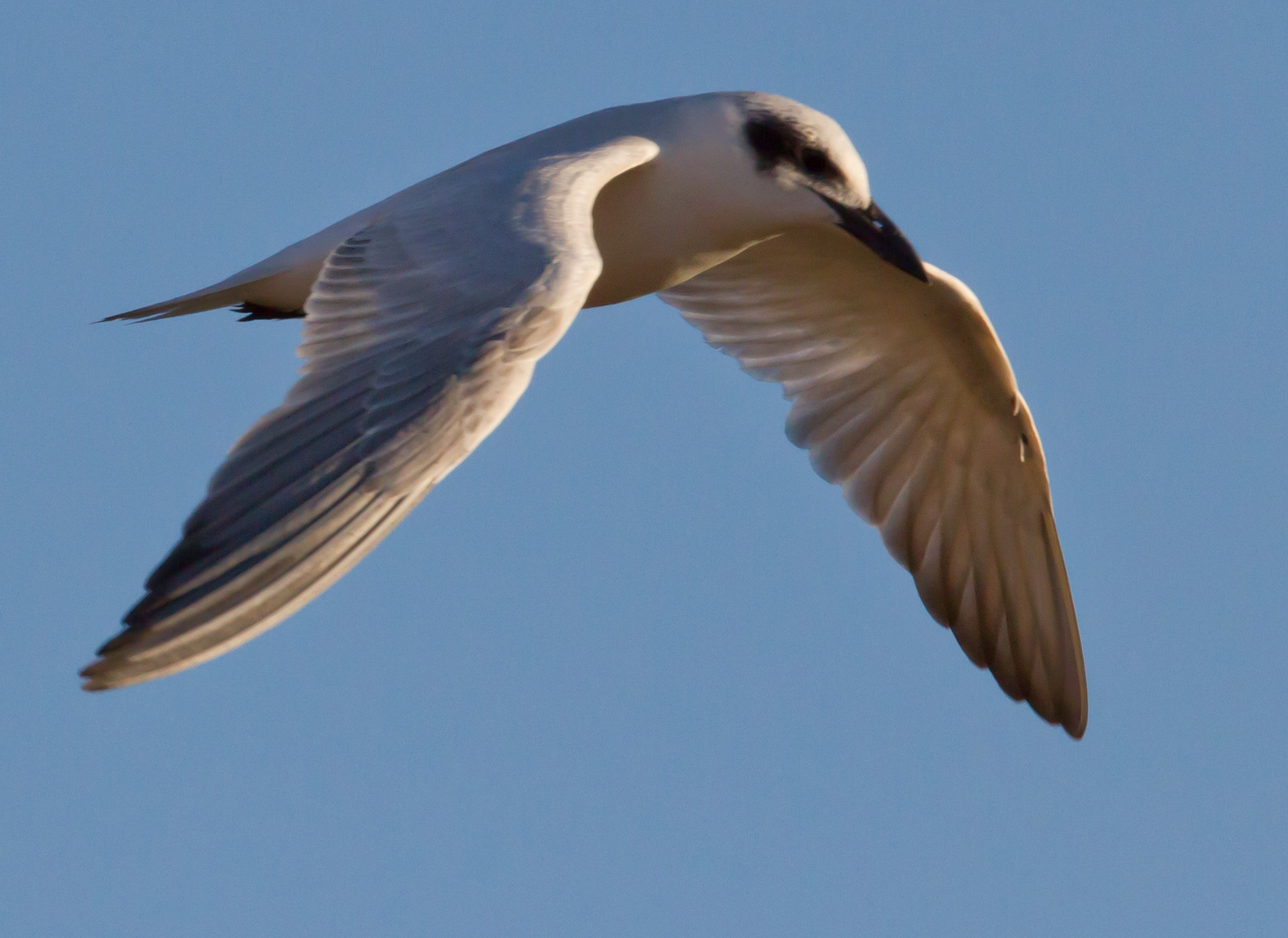

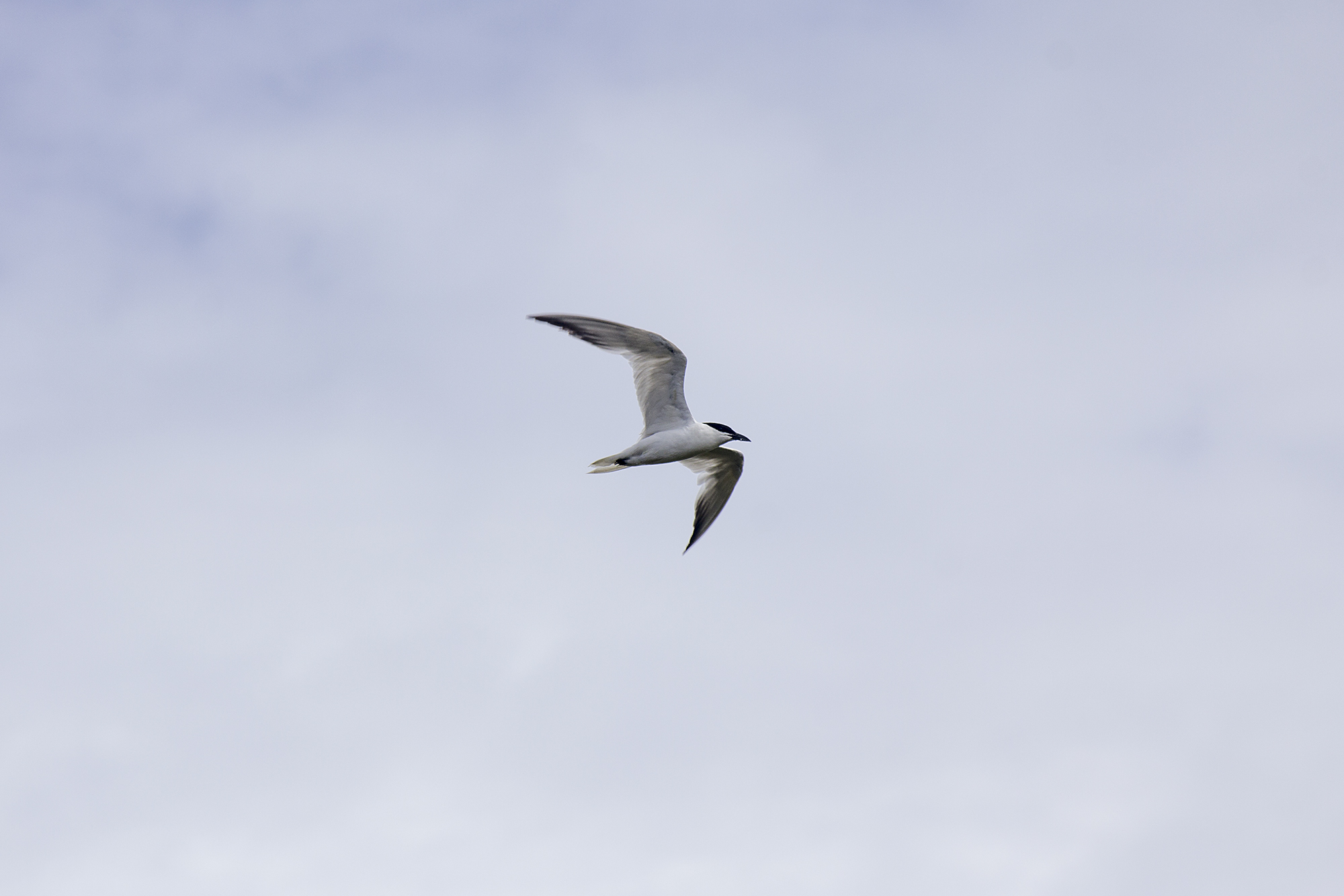

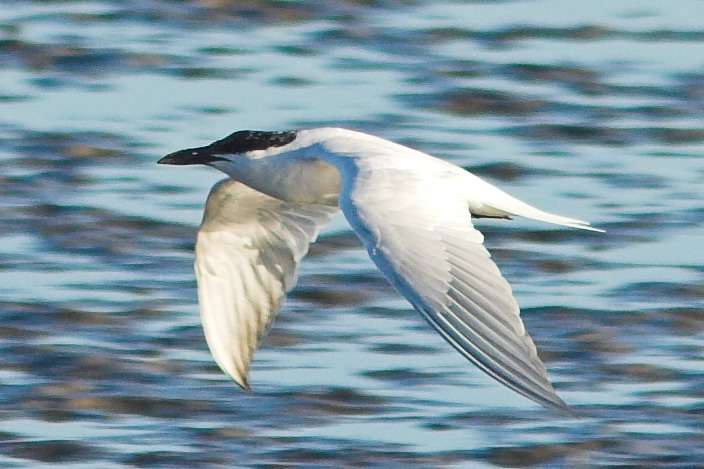
