= Robert Kretschmer =

German illustrator (1812–1872)

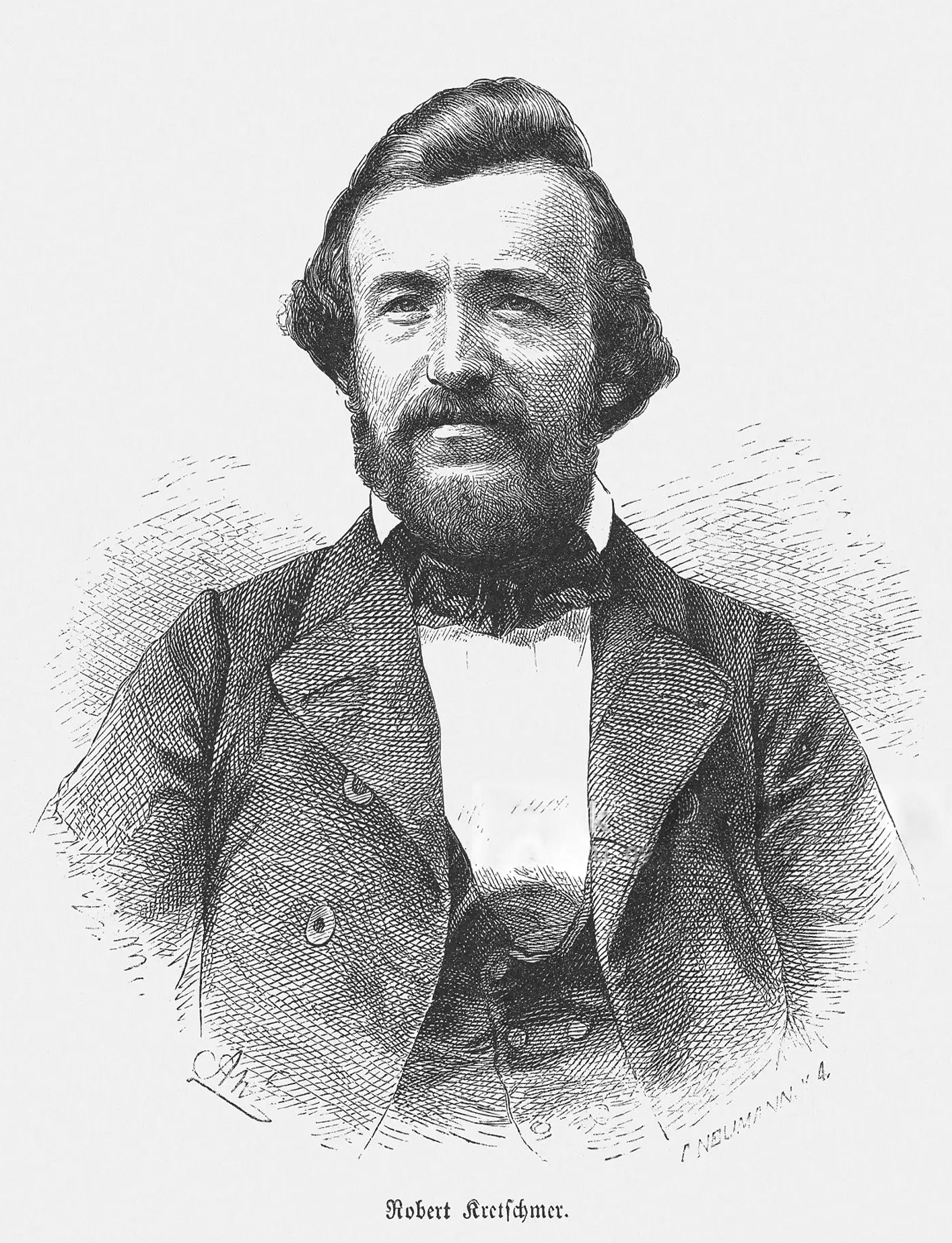

Robert Emil Gustav Kretschmer (29 January 1812 – 28 May 1872) was a German illustrator, known for his illustrations in Brehms Tierleben. He travelled to Africa as an ethnological and zoological illustrator along with Alfred Brehm and Duke Ernest II of Saxe-Coburg-Gotha in 1862.

Kretschmer was born in Berghof, central Silesia, where his father was a government official. He went to gymnasium in Schweidnitz and studied drawing under Ferdinand Koska in Breslau. He was admitted to the Academy of Arts in Berlin and studied historical illustration under Carl Wilhelm Kolbe (1781-1853). He specialized in ethnographic illustration and also became a costume designer at the Royal Court Theatre in Berlin. During the German Revolution of 1848, Kretschmer was in Berlin and he created illustrations of the scenes that he witnessed for the Illustrirte Zeitung from Leipzig. He worked at the newspaper until 1858 when he left as his studio was damaged and his materials stolen. In an autobiographical letter he noted that he became interested in animal illustration after meeting Emil Adolf Roßmäßler (1806–1867). He then began to study animals and visited zoological and botanical gardens along with Alfred Brehm. He then worked with Brehm on the Thierleben which made him famous. An exhibition of his paintings was held at the Leipzig Art Association in 1872.

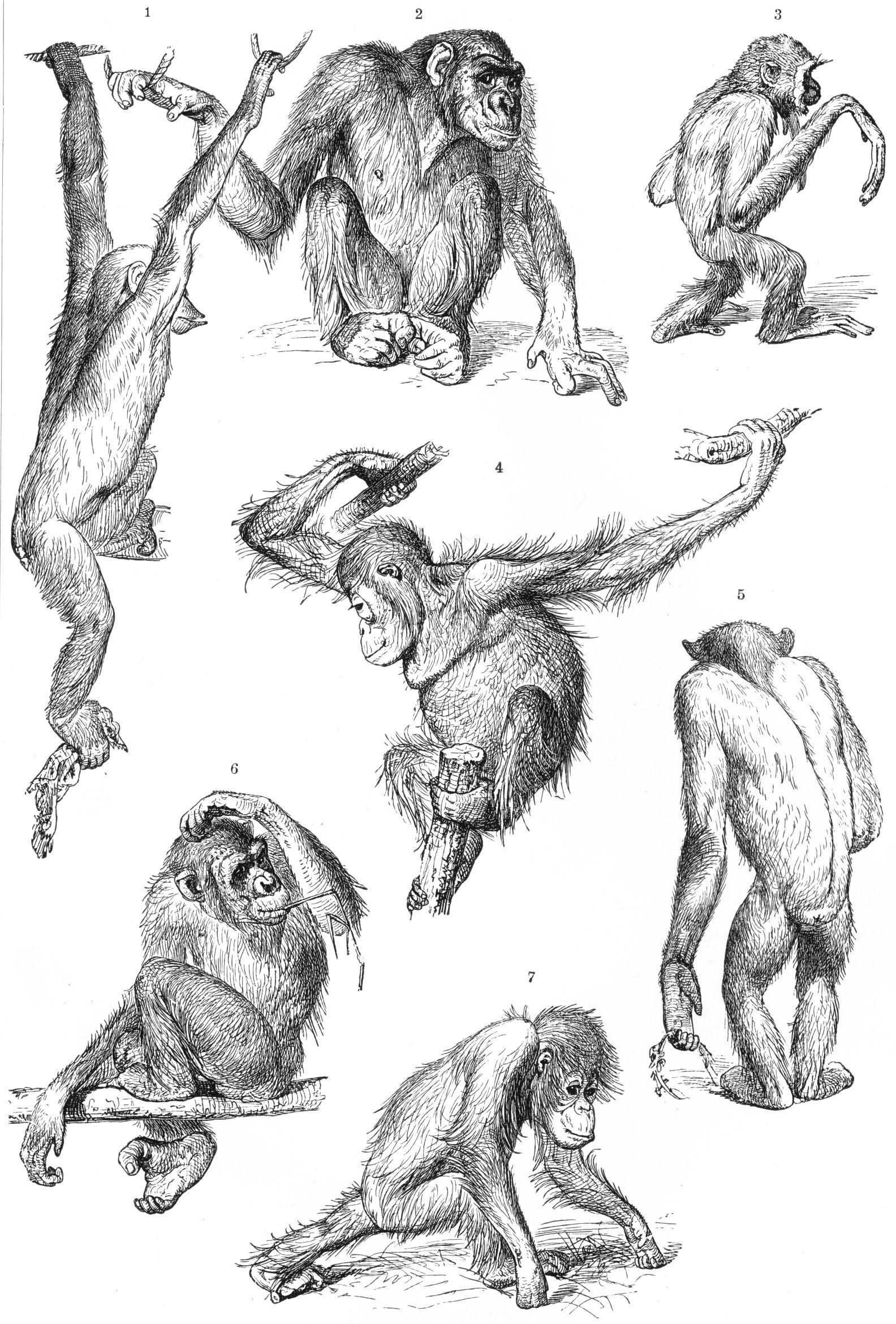
Primate drawings from Brehm's Tierleben
