= August Specht =

German painter (1849–1923)

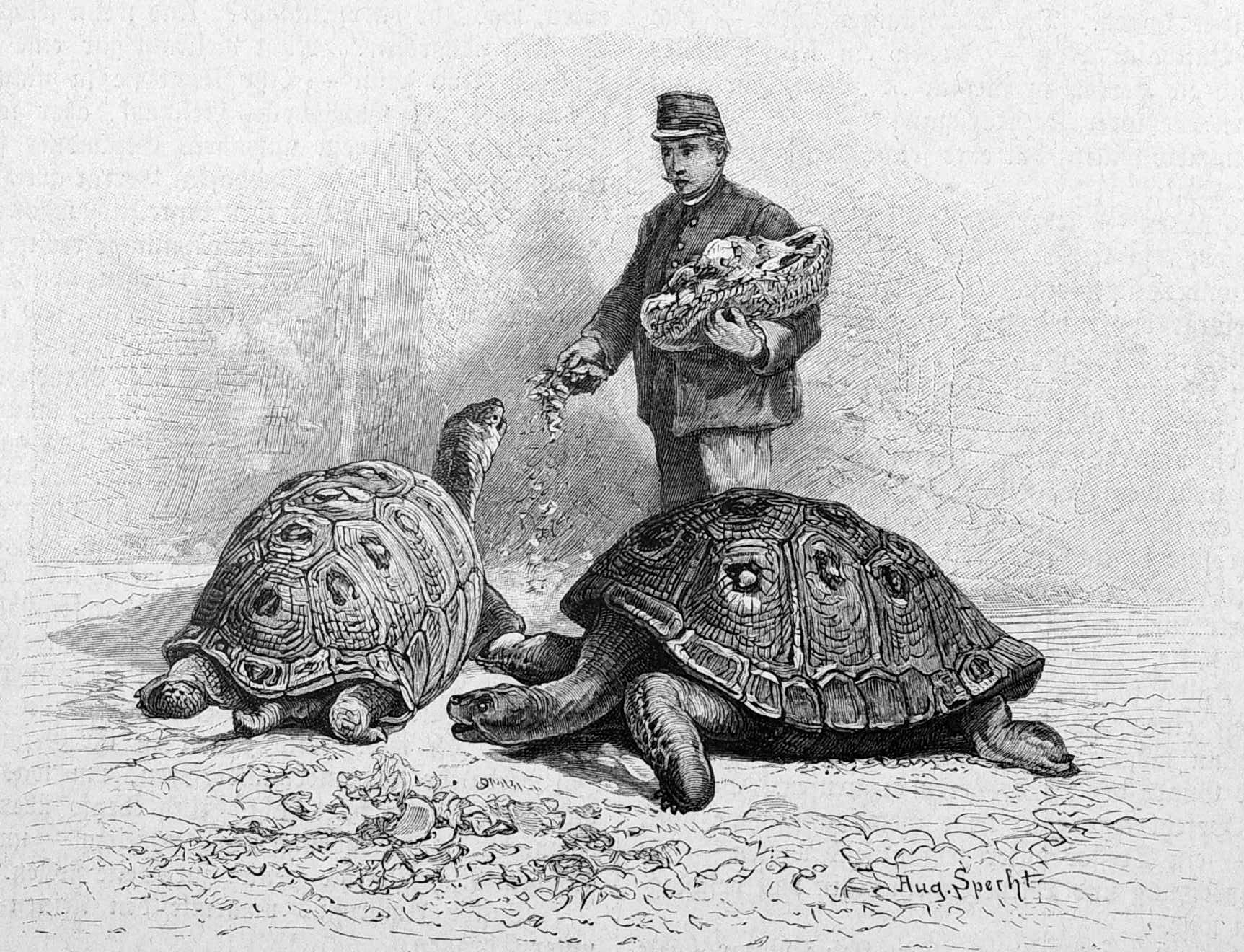
Galápagos tortoises in Hamburg Zoo - Illustration for "Die Gartenlaube"

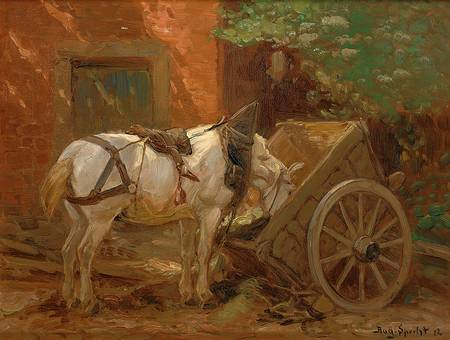
"Schimmel mit Zaumzeug frisst aus dem Gemüsewagen/Grey in harness feeding from vegetable cart"

August Specht (1 August 1849, Lauffen am Neckar – 26 May 1923, Stuttgart) was a German natural history artist and painter. He was a pupil of Heinrich Läpple and Albert Kappis. In 1898 he published Specht's Tierbilder-Buch with descriptions in verse of the depicted animals. Like his brother Friedrich Specht, he also produced illustrations of animals and landscapes for a number of publications, such as Brehms Tierleben and Die Gartenlaube.

Specht's brothers were the wood engraver Carl Gottlob Specht and the animal painter and illustrator Friedrich Specht.
