= F. W. J. Baedeker =

German pharmacist, collector of bird eggs and bird illustrator

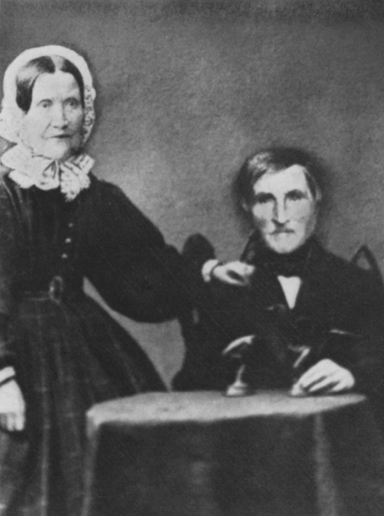
Friedrike and Baedeker, 1864

Friedrich Wilhelm Justus Baedeker (5 February 1788 – 21 April 1865) was a German pharmacist, collector of bird eggs and a bird illustrator. He was a collaborator of C. L. Brehm who attempted, unsuccessfully, to produce a major book on the birds of Europe between 1825 and 1828. His son however published an illustrated book on bird eggs.

== Life and work ==
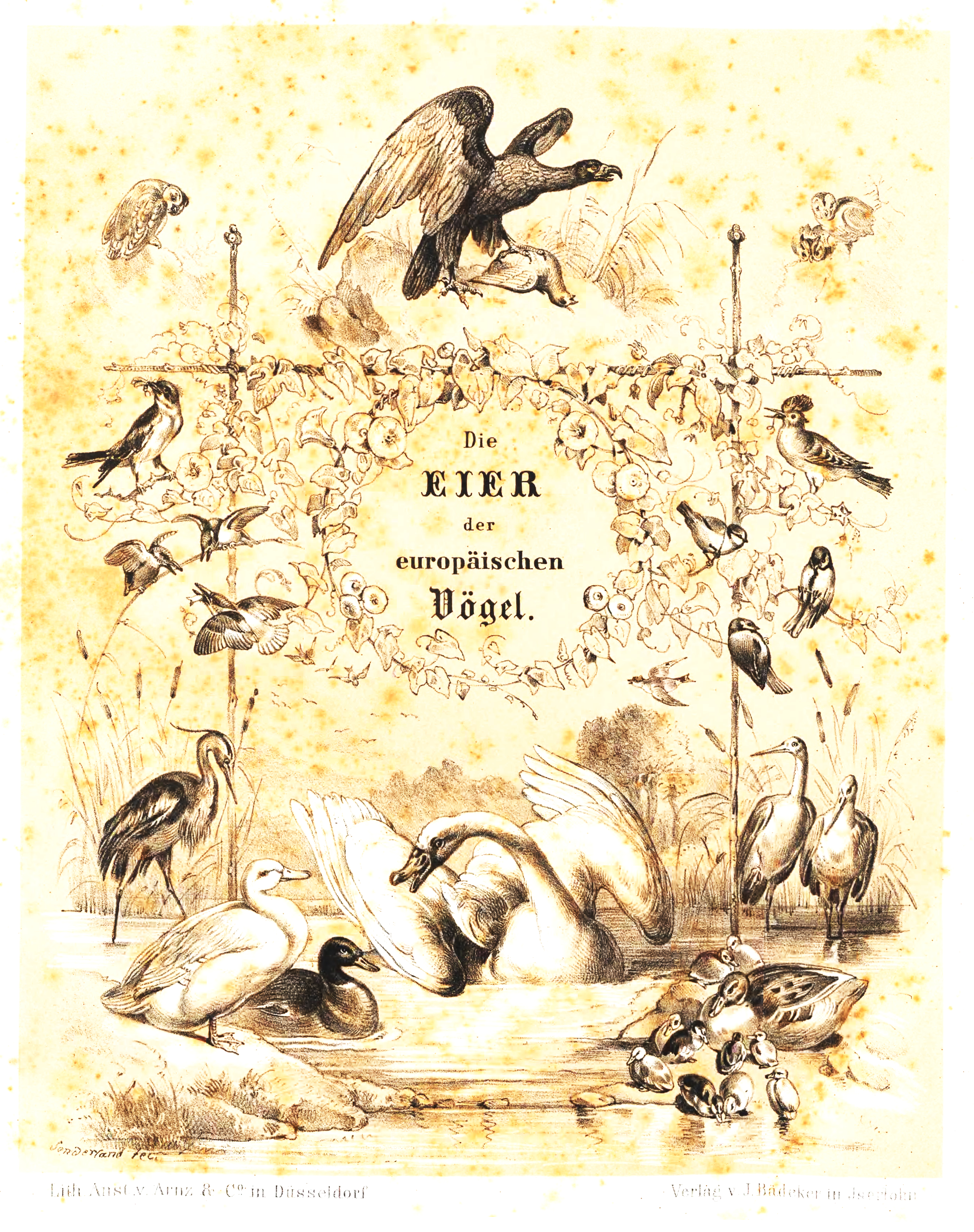
Title page of Die Eier

Baedeker was born in Hagen-Dahl to Protestant pastor Gotthilf Heinrich Jacob and Anna Dorothea Caroline Baedeker née Hülshoff. The family had numerous members in the book publishing industry. He was educated at home by his father and a school run by an uncle in Vörde. As a young boy, he worked with his father on the church property growing fruit trees and taking an interest in natural history. He became an apothecary apprentice in 1804 at Mülheim. He passed the exam for pharmacists in 1811 and owned an apotheke in Witten. He contributed paintings of birds to Christian Ludwig Brehm from 1820 but many of his works were unsuited for reproduction through lithography. His folio included 774 watercolours of about 386 European birds. Brehm and Baedeker were attempting to produce a complete natural history of the European birds (“Vollständige Naturgeschichte der europäischen Vögel”) with support sought from Friedrich Wilhelm III in 1825. The minister of state Karl von Altenstein forwarded the proposal to Hinrich Lichtenstein whose negative review ended the project. A manuscript version was however found in the collections that belonged to Frederic DuCane Godman. His plates were however used by August Carl Eduard Baldamus (1812-1893) and Johann Friedrich Naumann. He was also a collector of eggs and in 1891 he had about 4371 eggs, representing 519 European species and 1145 eggs of 496 exotic birds. Nine years later he only had 3467 eggs of 514 European species and 1073 eggs of 507 exotic species, suggesting that he supplied eggs to other collectors. Baedeker joined the Deutsche Ornithologen-Gesellschaft in 1851 shortly after its founding. A two volume work, Die Eier der europäischen Vögel nach der Natur gemalt with paintings of his bird eggs was published in 1863 by his son. The accompanying text was added by C.L. Brehm and Carl Wilhelm Gottfried Paeßler.

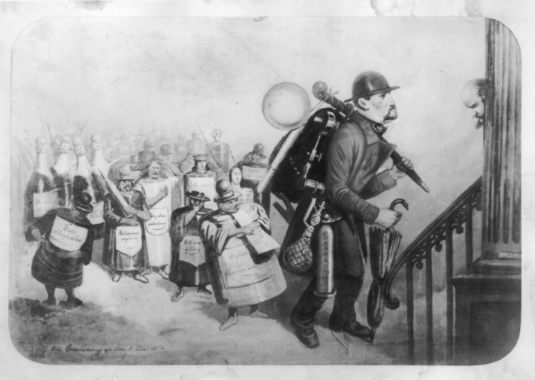
A caricature of Baedeker

Baedeker married Friederike Sybel (1787-1866), daughter of a businessman in Mülheim. They had nine children with two sons and all three daughters dying young. The oldest sun Julius Theodor (1814-1880) became a book publisher in Iserlohn and was involved in publishing the book on eggs written by his father. He suffered from an illness for eighteen month before dying at the age of 78. After his death, his egg illustrations received medals at the Paris, Dublin and Cologne exhibitions. A street in Witten is named after Baedeker. C.L. Brehm named Nyctale baedeckeri in 1855 after him but it is now a synonym for Aegolius funereus.
