= Zoological Garden of Hamburg =

Zoo in Hamburg, Germany

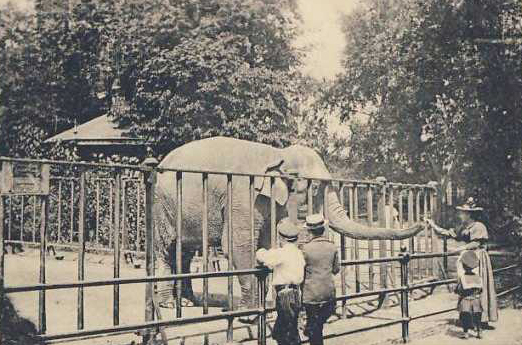
- A postcard from 1900 featuring an elephant at the Zoological Garden of Hamburg
- Interactive map of Zoological Garden of Hamburg
- 53°33′40″N 9°59′00″E
- Date opened: 1863
- Date closed: 1930
- Location: Hamburg, Germany

The Zoological Garden of Hamburg (German: Zoologischer Garten zu Hamburg) was a zoo in Hamburg, Germany that operated from 1863 until 1930. Its aquarium, which opened in 1864, was among the first in the world.

== Founding ==
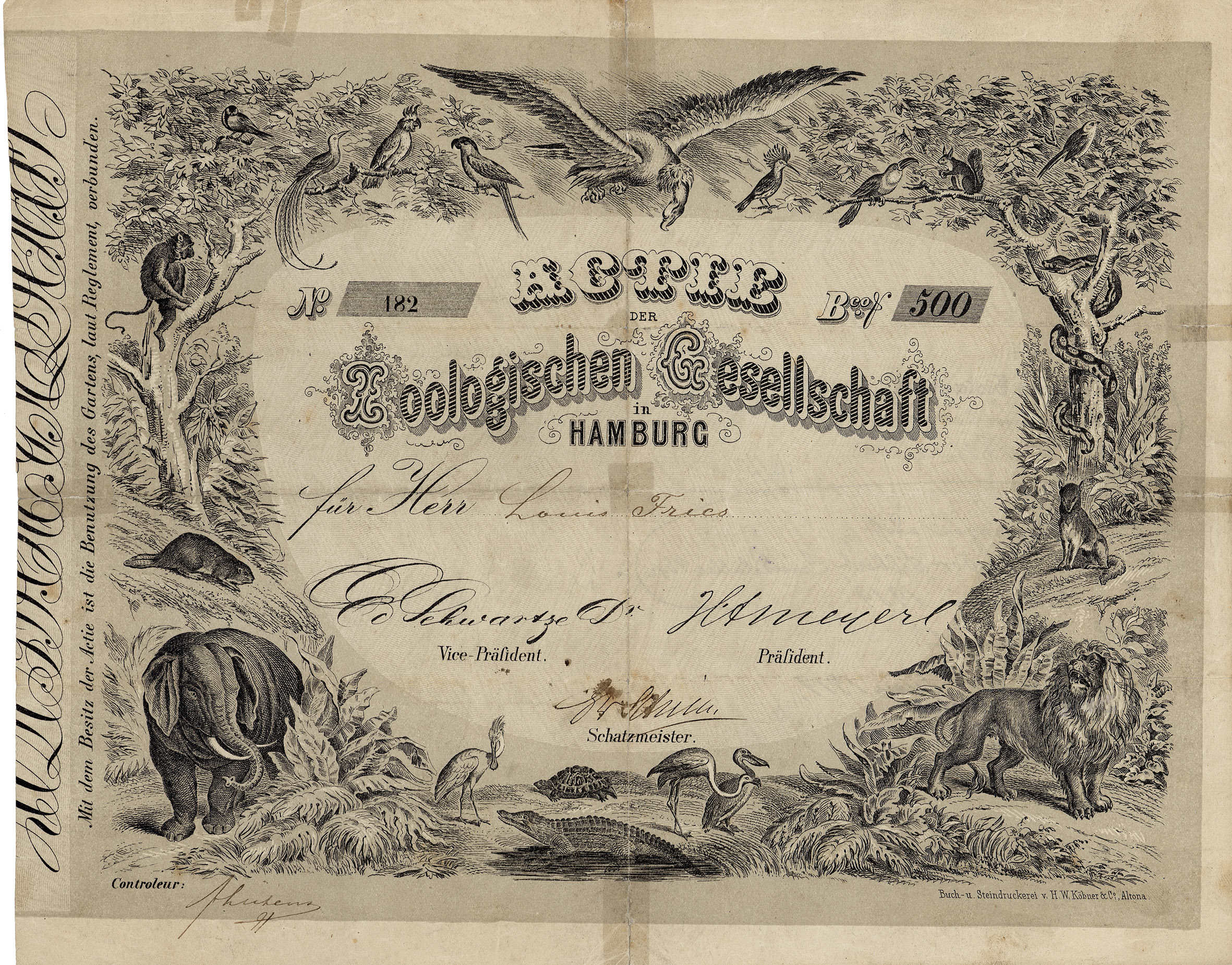
Share of the Zoologische Garten in Hamburg, issued 1. August 1864

In the 1850s, Hamburg was the third-largest city in the German Confederation; only Berlin and Vienna were larger. Trading in wild animals had begun in 1820 and a road-house menagerie was in operation in the 1840s. A wealthy merchant named Ernst von Merck, a member of parliament in the German government at Frankfurt am Main in 1848 and 1849, assembled a society for the purposes of creating a zoo. On 10 July 1860, at the charter meeting of the Zoological Society of Hamburg (German: Zoologische Gesellschaft in Hamburg), Merck was selected as president.

It was the fifth zoo in Germany, following the Berlin Zoological Garden in 1844, the Frankfurt Zoological Garden in 1858, the Cologne Zoological Garden in 1860 and the Dresden Zoo in 1861.

The Society was a shareholding company. In 1861 it purchased a 13-hectare (32 acre) plot of land outside the Hamburg city walls, next to a municipal cemetery. In November 1862 the zoo issued additional shares to finance the construction of an aquarium. Such was the excitement around the project, that all new shares sold in 24 hours.

== Early years ==
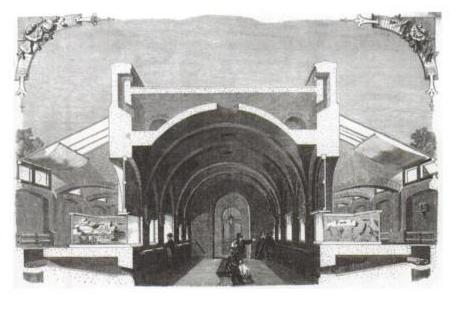
An 1865 sketch of a cross section of the "Ocean Fairy Castle" aquarium in the Zoological Garden of Hamburg

The zoo was quite popular when it opened on 17 May 1863. Although the population of Hamburg was only 300,000, around 54,000 people visited the zoo in its first week of operation. Annual attendance at the zoo in its first ten years of operation was between 225,000 and 355,000 visitors. The zoo's first director Alfred Edmund Brehm invested heavily in building up a large collection, even larger than that of the Berlin Zoo for much of its history. The zoo had several remarkable breeding successes—it was the first to breed the Brazilian Tapir in 1868, the Malayan Tapir in 1879, and the now-extinct Schomburgk's Deer in 1870. The zoo's aquarium, or the Marine Aquarium Temple, was among the best ever built. In 1865, a German national journal, Die Gartenlaube, declared an "Ocean Fairy Castle" superior to the aquarium of London. The first Sumatran Rhinoceros ever seen in Europe was acquired by the Hamburg Zoological Garden in 1868.

1863 also saw the birth of the zoo's first competitor, in a collection of exotic animals purchased by Carl Hagenbeck Sr. His son Carl Hagenbeck Jr. opened a competing facility in 1875, called Carl Hagenbeck's Tierpark. Though Hagenbeck's zoo was small, he acquired enough exotic animals to remain competitive.

== Decline ==
In 1907, Hagenbeck opened the new Tierpark Hagenbeck. The new facility revolutionized zoo design: instead of bars and cages, Hagenbeck became the first to use moats to separate animals from each other and the public. The Hamburg Zoological Garden looked outdated in comparison. In its early years, the Tierpark attracted as many as a million visitors annually, double the best audiences ever drawn to the Hamburg Zoological Garden.

World War I almost ruined both zoos. In 1915 the Hamburg zoological Garden built the world's largest primate house, with 22 outdoor and 69 indoor cages. Almost all the monkeys starved to death, however, during the war.

After the war, the German economy collapsed. While the Hagenbeck zoo was able to rebuild its animal trade, the zoological society could not. On 30 December 1920 the society was liquidated and on 21 January 1921 the zoo closed. A new group of investors, the Hamburg Zoological Garden Corporation, took over the zoo, and rebuilt it to a massive collection, including 882 species and subspecies, but following the 1929 stock market crash, the zoo headed again toward bankruptcy. An attempt was made to save the corporation by making the facility half-amusement park and half-bird park. The attempt failed and in 1931 the corporation went bankrupt and the zoo was closed forever. The city of Hamburg took over the zoo's lease and converted the site into a public park (Planten un Blomen).
