= Renthendorf =

- Municipality
- Location of Renthendorf within Saale-Holzland-Kreis district
- Interactive map of Renthendorf
- Location within Germany Location within Thuringia
- Coordinates: 50°47′N 11°51′E
- Country: Germany
- State: Thuringia
- District: Saale-Holzland-Kreis
- Municipal assoc.: Hügelland/Täler
- Subdivisions: 2

Government
  - Mayor (2022–28): Heiko Willsch

Area
  - Total: 11.62 km^{2} (4.49 sq mi)
- Elevation: 290 m (950 ft)

Population (2025-12-31)
  - Total: 414
  - Density: 35.6/km^{2} (92.3/sq mi)
- Time zone: UTC+01:00 (CET)
  - Summer (DST): UTC+02:00 (CEST)
- Postal codes: 07646
- Dialling codes: 036426
- Vehicle registration: SHK, EIS, SRO
- Website: www.huegelland-taeler.de

Renthendorf is a municipality in the district Saale-Holzland, in Thuringia, Germany. The ornithologist Christian Ludwig Brehm was minister in Renthendorf from 1813, and his son Alfred Brehm, also a distinguished zoologist, was born there in 1829.
