= Johann Heinrich Gottfried Apetz =

Johann Heinrich Gottfried Apetz Latinized as Henricum Apetz (24 February 1794 – 8 November 1857) was a German orientalist and entomologist.

Apetz was the son of Johann Gottfried Apetz who worked for the duke in Altenburg and Christiane Wilhelmina née Müller. He studied theology in Jena and became interested in orientalism with studies under Kosegarten. He published a description of the Malabar region based on Ibn Battuta Arabic text in 1819 in Latin as Descriptio terrae Malabar. He worked at the Fellenberg Institute in Hofwiel near Bern and later taught at Altenburg. He also worked on the history of Herodotus along with A. Matthiae. He became a deacon in Lurka in 1826 and taught at the Friedrich-Gymnasium in Altenburg from 1830.

Apetz was interested in insects and described several species that were collected by others including Oskar Brehm. He is noted for amassing a large collection of beetles from East Asia. Scymnus apetzii was named after him by Mulsant in 1846. He married Marie née Thienemann and one of their sons, (Ernst) Theodor (d. 1898), accompanied the Brehms into Africa.
