= Virtual Laboratory =

The online project Virtual Laboratory. Essays and Resources on the Experimentalization of Life, 1830-1930, located at the Max Planck Institute for the History of Science, is dedicated to research in the history of the experimentalization of life. The term experimentalization describes the interaction between the life sciences, the arts, architecture, media and technology within the experimental paradigm, ca. 1830 to 1930. The Virtual Laboratory is a platform that not only presents work on this topic but also acts as a research environment for new studies.

== History ==
In 1977, the first version of the Virtual Laboratory was presented, titled Virtual Laboratory of Physiology. At this time, the main focus lay on the development of technological preconditions of physiological research in the 19th century. Therefore, a database with relevant texts and images was created. In 1998, the concept still used today was created after a series of modifications, followed by the publication of a cd-ROM in 1999. At this time, the focus had been expanded from physiology to the life sciences in general, as well as the arts and literature. As the project had been extended from a sole database to a platform for historiographical research, it was presented at the conference Using the World Wide Web for Historical Research in Science and Technology organized by the Alfred P. Sloan Foundation at Stanford University. In 2000, the project was incorporated into the research project The Experimentalization of Life, funded by the Volkswagen Foundation. This was followed by another presentation at the conference Virtual Research? The impact of new technologies on scientific practices at the ETH Zurich. In 2002, the first version of the Virtual Laboratory went online. Since 2008, the Virtual Laboratory is listed as a journal under the ISSN number 1866-4784.

== Structure ==
The Virtual Laboratory consists of two parts: The archive holds a large number of digitized texts and images as well as data sheets compiled from these resources, the laboratory holds historiographical work on the experimentalization of life as well as a working environment to enable new ways of writing history. The Virtual Laboratory is composed of 8 sections:

- Essays: this section holds the historiographical papers that are in turn linked to the source material of the archive.
- Experiments: contains data sheets on classical experiments from 19th century life sciences, e.g. on blood circulation, muscle contraction, verve conduction and reaction time.
- Technology: deals with the technological aspects of experimentalization, hence the instruments.
- Objects: this section is still under construction. It will contain the actual objects of the experiments, hence organisms.
- Sites: contains data sheets on institutions at which experimental work was conducted.
- People: this sections holds short biographies of the protagonists of experimentalization.
- Concepts: is dedicated to central concepts like reflex, function and consciousness and their respective histories.
- Library: this is the core section of the Virtual Laboratory. Besides digitized texts, journals and trade catalogues, it holds manuscripts, audio files and excerpts of movies. The printed texts are in the process of being ocr-ed and are already partly accessible via fulltext search.

All materials are available as pdf downloads.

Apart from these thematical sections, tools and myLab offer the possibility to use the Virtual Laboratory as a research environment. It is possible to create specific collections from the available materials, work on them and share them with other users.

== Literature ==
- Schmidgen, Henning; Evans, Rand B.: The Virtual Laboratory: A New On-Line Resource for the History of Psychology. History of Psychology, 6 (2), p. 208-213, 2003
- Dierig, Sven; Kantel, Jörg; Schmidgen, Henning: The Virtual Laboratory for Physiology. Max-Planck-Institute for the History of Science Preprint 140, 2000 (pdf)
