= Alfred Brehm =

German zoologist and writer (1829–1884)

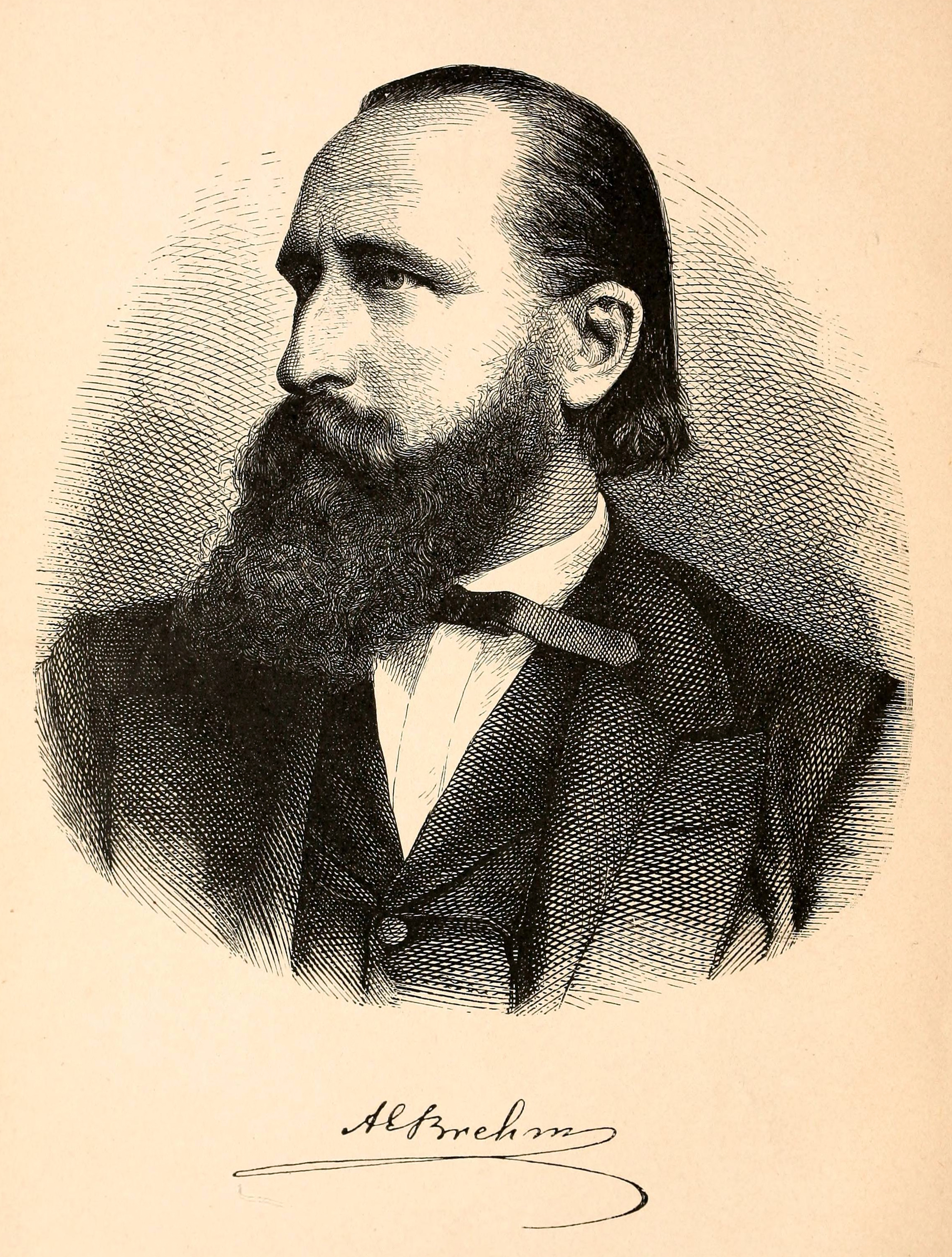
- Born: Alfred Edmund Brehm; 2 February 1829; Unterrenthendorf, Saxe-Altenburg
- Died: 11 November 1884 (aged 55); Renthendorf, German Empire
- Education: University of Jena
- Occupations: Zoologist, writer
- Known for: Brehm's Life of Animals
- Spouse: Mathilde Reiz
- Children: Five
- Father: Christian Ludwig Brehm
- Scientific career
- Workplaces: Zoological Garden of Hamburg
- Author abbrev. (zoology): A.E. Brehm

Alfred Edmund Brehm (German pronunciation: [ˈalfʁeːt ˈʔɛtmʊnt ˈbʁeːm]; 2 February 1829 – 11 November 1884) was a German zoologist and writer. His multi-volume book Brehms Tierleben, which he co-authored with Eduard Pechuël-Loesche, Wilhelm Haacke, and Richard Schmidtlein, became a household word for popular zoological literature. He was the first director of the Zoological Garden of Hamburg.

== Early life ==
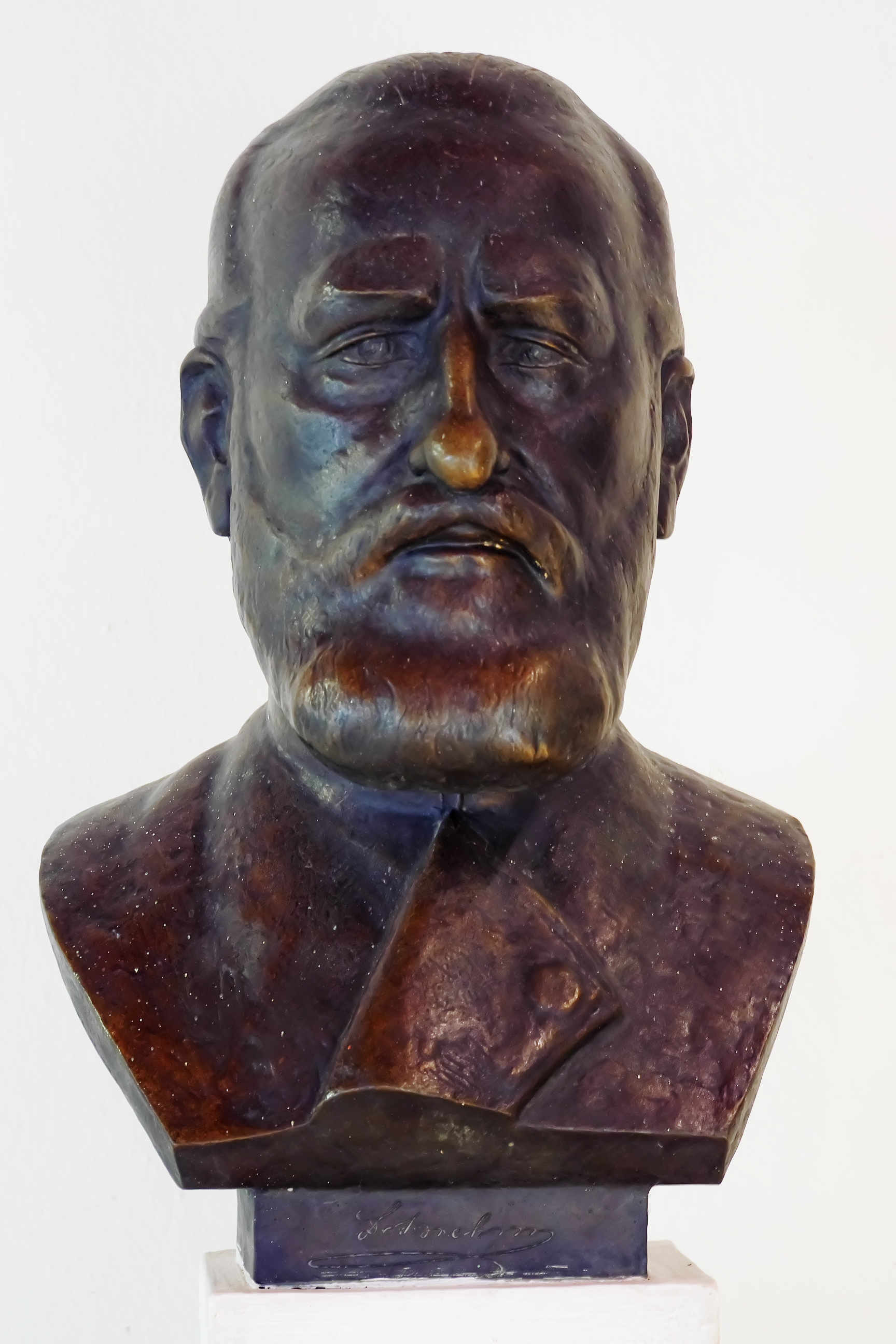
Bust in Tierpark Friedrichsfelde with signature in base

Brehm grew up in the small Thuringian village of Unterrenthendorf as the son of the pastor Christian Ludwig Brehm, and of his second wife Bertha née Reiz. Christian Ludwig Brehm made a name for himself as an ornithologist by publications and through an extensive collection of stuffed birds. The collection, held in the parsonage and consisting of over 9,000 dead birds, offered a glimpse into the world of European birds. As a boy he helped expand his father by collecting specimens and became an excellent marksman. His father's research gave the younger Brehm an interest in zoology, but at first he wanted to become an architect. In the spring of 1844 he began to study with a builder in Altenburg. He continued his studies there until September 1846, when he left for Dresden in order to study architecture; however, he stopped after two semesters because Baron Johann Wilhelm von Müller, a well-known ornithologist, was looking for a companion for an African expedition. Brehm joined the expedition on 31 May 1847 as a secretary and as a collecting assistant to von Müller. The expedition took him to Egypt, the Sudan, and the Sinai Peninsula; the discoveries made were so important that, at age 20, Brehm was made a member of the German Academy of Natural Scientists Leopoldina.

== Career ==
After his return, in 1853 he started to study natural sciences at the University of Jena. Like his brother Reinhold, he became active with the student corps Saxonia Jena; because of his expedition to North Africa, he received the nickname Pharaoh from his corps brothers. He graduated after four semesters in 1855 and in 1856 went on a two-year journey to Spain with his brother Reinhold. Afterwards he settled down in Leipzig as a freelance writer and wrote many essays in the service of science popularization for Die Gartenlaube and other magazines. Soon, Brehm became one of Germany's most popular naturalists and science writers, focusing on zoological themes.

Apart from this, he undertook an expedition to Norway and Lapland in 1860.

In May 1861 Brehm married his cousin Mathilde Reiz, with whom he had five children. Since he wanted to travel, in 1862 he accepted the invitation of Duke Ernst II of Saxe-Coburg-Gotha to accompany him on a trip to Abyssinia. On this trip Brehm met the artist Robert Kretschmer who would assist him in his later books. Afterwards, Brehm travelled to Africa as well as to Scandinavia and Siberia. His essays and expedition reports from the animal world were well received by the educated bourgeoisie; because of this, he was commissioned by the editor of the Bibliographisches Institut, Herrmann Julius Meyer, to write a large multivolume work on the animal world. This book became known worldwide as Brehms Tierleben (or, in English, Brehm's Life of Animals). Although Brehm's ethology is no longer seen as correct in all details, the title of his work is still a catchphrase.

Brehm's life was full with writing, scientific expeditions and lecture tours. Despite this, in 1862, he accepted the post of first director of the Zoological Garden of Hamburg and kept this position until 1867. Afterwards he went to Berlin, where he opened an aquarium. He remained with the aquarium until 1874. In 1876 he travelled to Siberia with Otto Finsch. In the winter of 1883 to 1884 Brehm planned a lecture tour to the US. Shortly before his departure, his four children contracted diphtheria. Since he could not afford to break his contract, Brehm, a widower since 1878, went ahead with his tour. At the end of January he received word of his youngest son's death. After the hardship of this news Brehm relapsed into malaria, which he had caught in Africa in his expedition days. On 11 May 1884, he came back to Berlin. In order to find peace, he returned in July to his home town of Renthendorf, where he died on 11 November 1884. Today, the Brehm Memorial Museum is located there.

== Selected publications ==
- Brehms Tierleben (English title: Brehm's Life of Animals.) See the article on Brehms Tierleben for its editions, titles and availability of online text.
- Reiseskizzen aus Nord-Ost-Afrika (1855, 3 vols., pub. Friedrich Mauke, Jena.)
- Das Leben der Vögel (pub. C. Flemming, Glogau, 1861; second edition 1867.)
- Ergebnisse einer Reise nach Habesch (1863, pub. O. Meissner, Hamburg.)
- Die Thiere des Waldes, with Emil Adolf Rossmässler (2 vols., 1864–1867, pub. C. F. Winter, Leipzig and Heidelberg.)
- Gefangene Vögel, with Otto Finsch (2 vols., 1872–1876, pub. C.F. Winter'sche Verlagshandlung, Leipzig.)
- (wild life and scenes in many places)
