= Christian Ludwig Brehm =

German pastor and ornithologist (1787–1864)

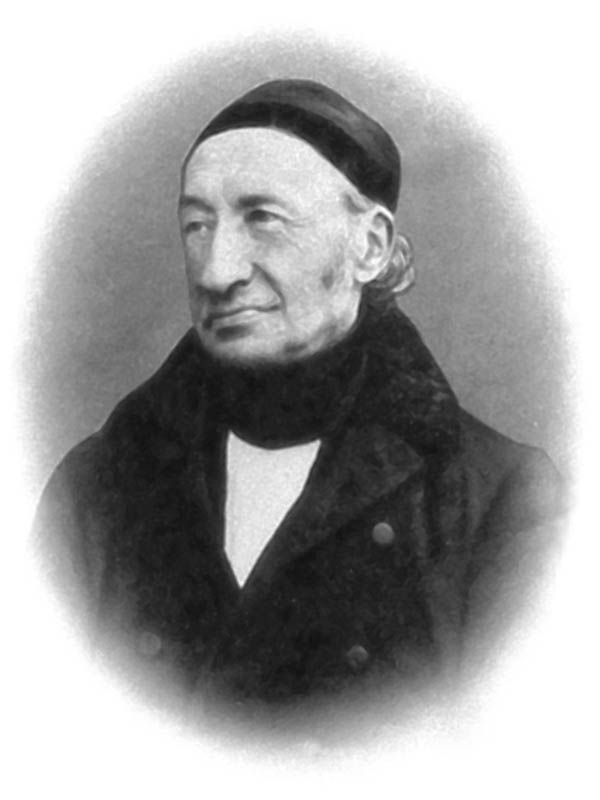
- Born: 24 January 1787; Schönau, Margraviate of Baden, Holy Roman Empire
- Died: 23 June 1864 (aged 77); Renthendorf, Saxe-Altenburg
- Education: University of Jena
- Known for: Handbuch der Naturgeschichte aller Vögel Deutschlands
- Children: Alfred Brehm
- Scientific career
- Fields: Ornithology
- Author abbrev. (zoology): C.L. Brehm

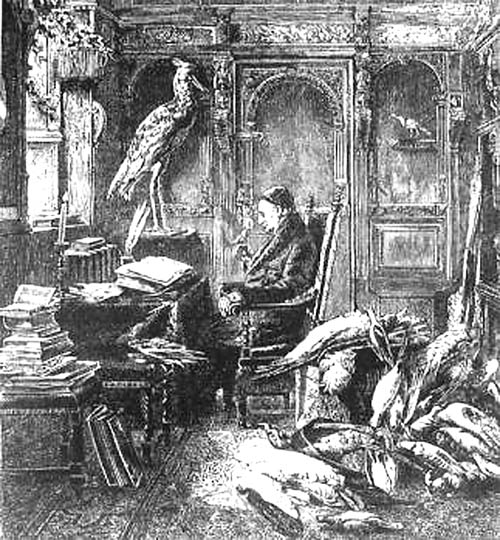

Christian Ludwig Brehm (24 January 1787 – 23 June 1864) was a German pastor and ornithologist. He was the father of the zoologist Alfred Brehm.

== Life ==
Brehm was born in Schönau near Gotha on 24 January 1787. He was educated at University of Jena to be ordained as minister at Renthendorf in 1813 where he remained until his death on 23 June 1864. He wrote Beiträge zur Vogelkunde (1820–22), which described 104 species of German birds in minute detail, and Handbuch der Naturgeschichte aller Vögel Deutschlands (1831) which described 900 bird species.

Brehm accumulated a collection of 15,000 birds until his death, which included samples from his son, Alfred Brehm. Alfred collected these birds from Sudan, Egypt, and throughout Europe. He offered these to the Berlin Zoological Museum in March 1835 because he feared that a storm would destroy his house, but the sale fell through. After his death, they remained in the attic of his house, where Otto Kleinschmidt discovered them some years later. Kleinschmidt persuaded Lord Rothschild to buy them in 1897; they consisted of 9,000 skins, and the collection arrived at his Natural History Museum at Tring in 1932. However, the collection returned to Germany, where it was moved to Museum Koenig, located in Bonn.

== Works ==
- Beiträge zur Vogelkunde 3 Bde, ab Bd. 3 in collaboration with W. Schilling. Neustadt a. Orla 1820–1822.
- Lehrbuch der Naturgeschichte aller europäischen Vögel, 2 Bde. Jena 1823–1824
- Ornis oder das Neueste und Wichtigste der Vogelkunde. Jena 1824–1827, first ornithologic journal.
- Handbuch der Naturgeschichte aller Vögel Deutschlands. Ilmenau 1831.
- Handbuch für den Liebhaber der Stuben-, Haus- und aller der Zähmung werthen Vögel. Ilmenau 1832.
- Der Vogelfang. Leipzig 1836.
- Der vollständige Vogelfang.Weimar 1855.
- Die Kunst, Vögel als Bälge zu bereiten. Weimar 1842.
- Die Wartung, Pflege und Fortpflanzung der Canarienvögel. Weimar 1855, 2. ed. Weimar 1865, 3. ed. Weimar 1872, 4. ed. Weimar 1883, 5. ed.. Weimar 1893.
- Die Naturgeschichte und Zucht der Tauben. Weimar 1857.
- (with E. Baldamus, John Wilhelm von Müller & J. F. Naumann) Verzeichnis der Vögel Europa's. als Tausch-Catalog eingerichtet. Stuttgart 1852
- Monographie der Papageien oder vollständige Naturgeschichte aller bis jetzt bekannten Papageien mit getreuen und ausgemalten Abbildungen, im Vereine mit anderen Naturforscher herausgegeben von C.L. Brehm. Jena & Paris 1842–1855

== See also ==
- Academy of Sciences Leopoldina
