= F. A. Brockhaus AG =

German book publishing firm

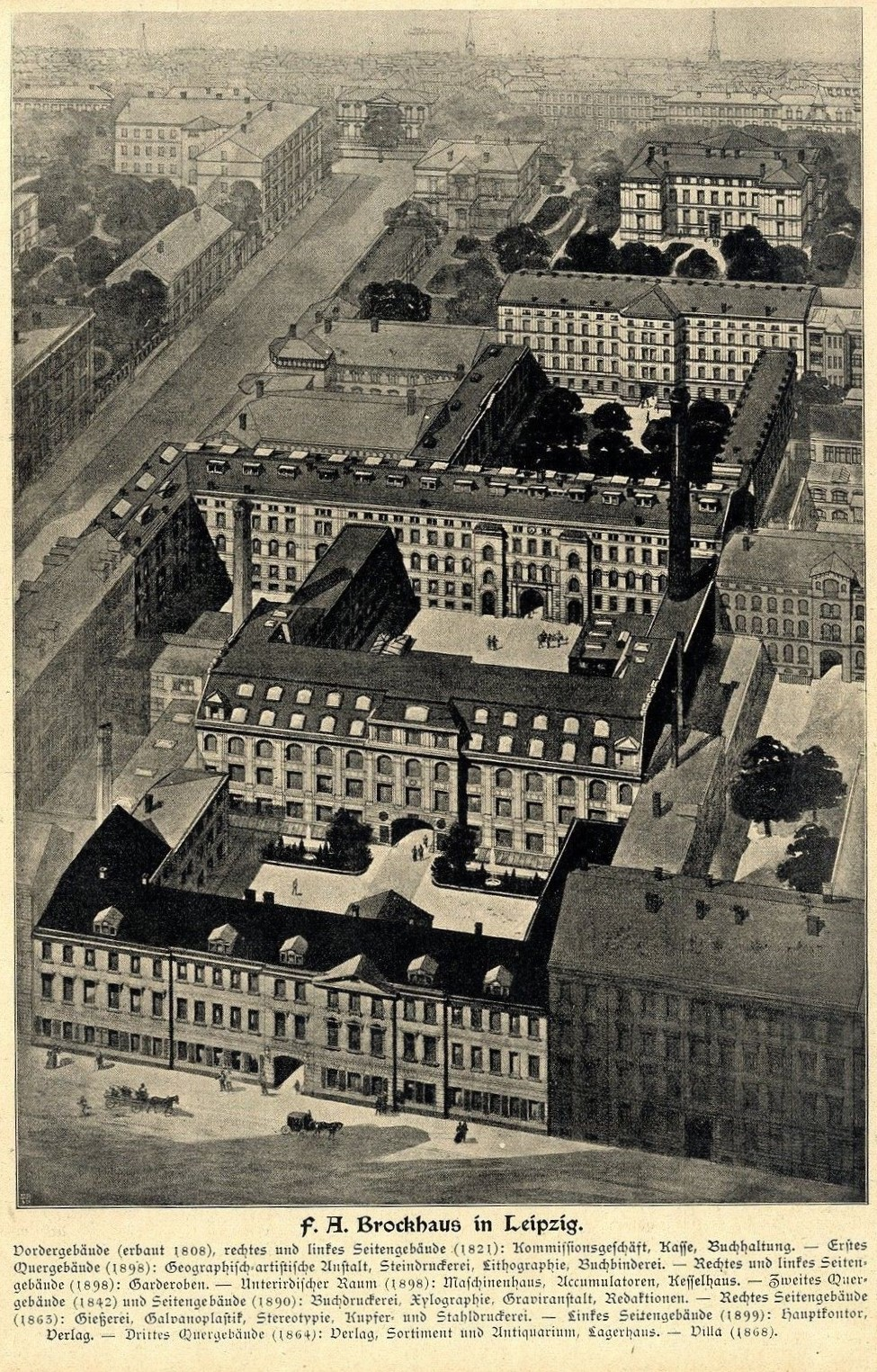
- Company building in 1899
- Type: Publishing company
- Industry: Book publishing
- Founded: 1805 in Amsterdam
- Founder: Friedrich Arnold Brockhaus
- Defunct: March 20, 2009
- Fate: Merger with Bibliographisches Institut AG to Bibliographisches Institut & F. A. Brockhaus AG (1984); Divestiture (break-up) through asset-stripping (2009)
- Successor: Bibliographisches Institut & F. A. Brockhaus AG
- Headquarters: Munich, Germany

F. A. Brockhaus AG was a German book publishing firm founded by Friedrich Arnold Brockhaus. It was best known for its eponymous encyclopedia and other renowned bedrock brands for lexical functional grammar such as Duden, Meyers or the Harenberg Lexikon-Verlag and Kunstverlag Weingarten. Its legal successor is the company Bibliographisches Institut & F. A. Brockhaus AG.

The publicly traded company was eventually divested through fundamental asset-stripping after rights of the renown Brockhaus brand, including rights for its online presence and Meyers Online, were sold off to Bertelsmann subsidiary Arvato, following a stock take-over through majority stakeholder Cornelsen Verlag. The remaining book publisher and legal successor, which has completely withdrawn from any lexical functional grammar or reference-works business fields, now operates under the name Bibliographisches Institut GmbH.

== History ==
Friedrich Arnold Brockhaus founded his publishing house in 1805 in Amsterdam, then part of the Batavian Republic. In 1808, he acquired the rights to the Conversations-Lexikon, whose later editions came to be known as the Great Brockhaus (Der Große Brockhaus) and the Brockhaus Encyclopedia (Brockhaus Enzyklopädie). He relocated it to Altenburg in Saxe-Gotha-Altenburg in 1811 and then to Leipzig in Saxony in 1817. Its Leipzig operations were nationalized by East Germany following its 1953 formation. Its East German successor published reference works and geographical and ethnographic texts. Its West German successor established itself in Wiesbaden. Following German reunification, corporate headquarters were moved to Munich.

== Footnotes ==
=== Bibliography ===
- "Brockhaus", The Great Soviet Encyclopedia, 1970
