= Conversations-Lexikon =

Conversations-Lexikon or Konversations-Lexikon may refer to:

- Conversations-Lexikon mit vorzüglicher Rücksicht auf die gegenwärtigen Zeiten, a German-language encyclopedia published between 1796 and 1808
  - Brockhaus Enzyklopädie, successive editions of the Conversations-Lexikon encyclopedia
- Meyers Konversations-Lexikon, a major German-language encyclopedia from 1839 to 1984
