= Al-Mathaf =

Weekly news magazine in Egypt (1894)

- Editor: Yaʿqūb and Qusṭanṭīn Nawfal
- Categories: News, science, economics, fine arts
- Frequency: Weekly
- Founded: 1894
- Final issue: 1894
- Country: Egypt
- Based in: Alexandria
- Language: Arabic
- Website: nbn-resolving.de/urn:nbn:de:hbz:5:1-302431

The Egyptian weekly magazine al-Mathaf (Arabic: المتحف; DMG: al-Matḥaf; "The Museum") was owned and published by Yaʿqūb Nawfal and Qusṭanṭīn Nawfal in Alexandria in 1894. 1 Despite its name, it had nothing to do with artifacts. It describes itself as a news magazine that provides information on science, economics and fine arts.
