= Der kleine Brockhaus =

Encyclopedia in German language

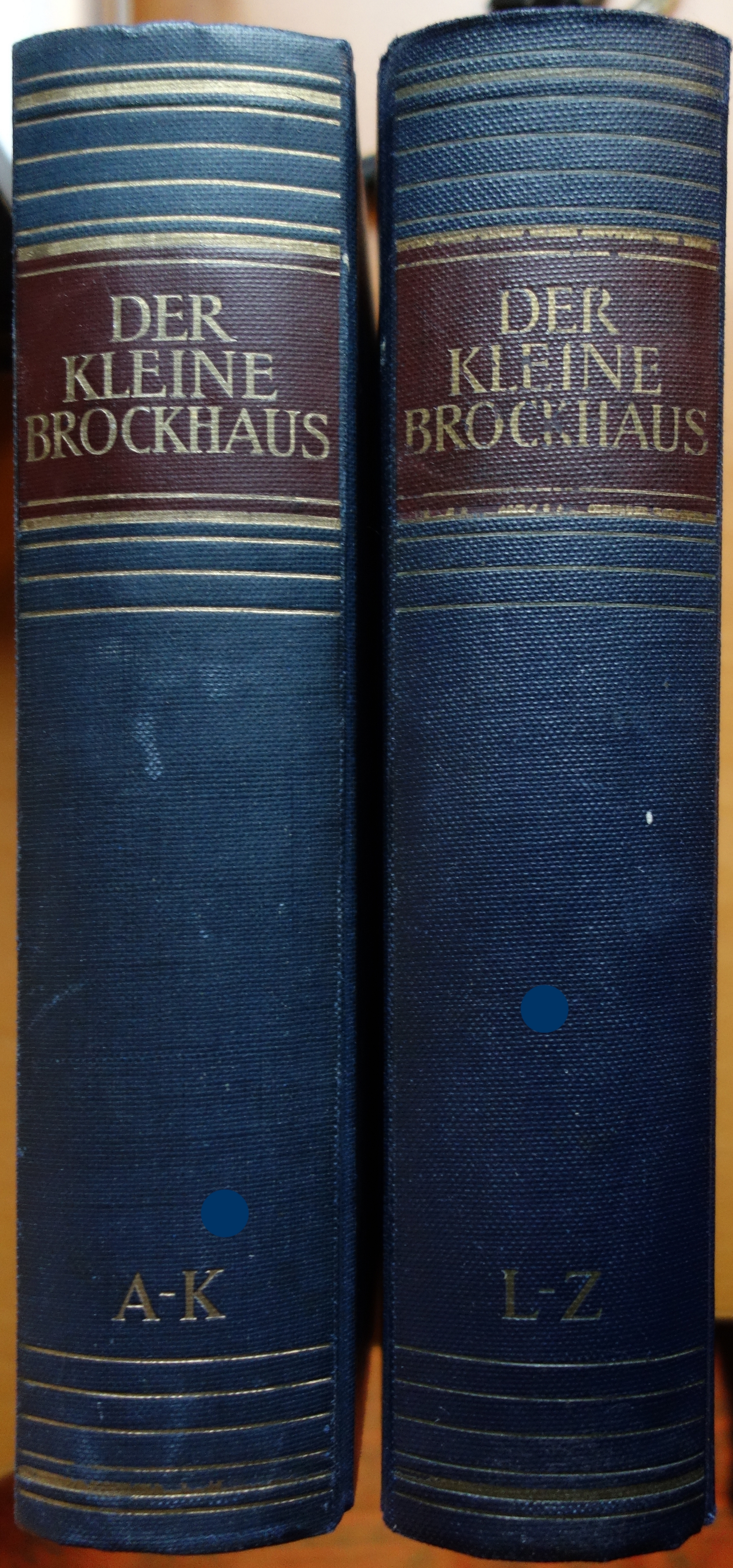
Der kleine Brockhaus from 1949

Der kleine Brockhaus (English: The little Brockhaus) is the name of a series of encyclopedias published by F. A. Brockhaus. It was published as an alternative to the Großer Brockhaus (big Brockhaus) which are the main encyclopedia published by the same company.

Der kleine Brockhaus: Handbuch des Wissens in einem Band (The little Brockhaus: Handbook of Knowledge in one volume) was published in 1925. It had 804 pages, over 5400 illustrations and maps in the text and on 88 monochrome and colorful plate and map pages, as well as 36 overviews and chronological tables. A second printing was made in 1926, it contained 6000 illustrations and maps in the text and on 89 monochrome and colorful plate and map pages, as well as 37 overviews and chronological tables.

Since it was a shorter version and mean to be an alternative for general reader in the crisis year of 1923 and following, the binding and material of this edition were made of less durable material.

The second edition was published in 1930 with over 6200 illustrations and maps in the text and on 91 monochrome and colorful plate and map pages, as well as 37 overview maps and time tables.

The first post-war edition in 1949, published in Wiesbaden, consisted of two volumes with around 700 pages each. The edition advertised itself with a total of 5,400 illustrations and maps in the text, with more than one hundred colorful and monochrome plate pages and two hundred overviews and chronological tables.

The completely redesigned new edition, the fourth edition, was published in 1961.
