= Hermann Brockhaus =

German orientalist (1806–1877)

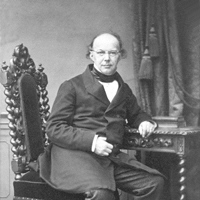
Hermann Brockhaus

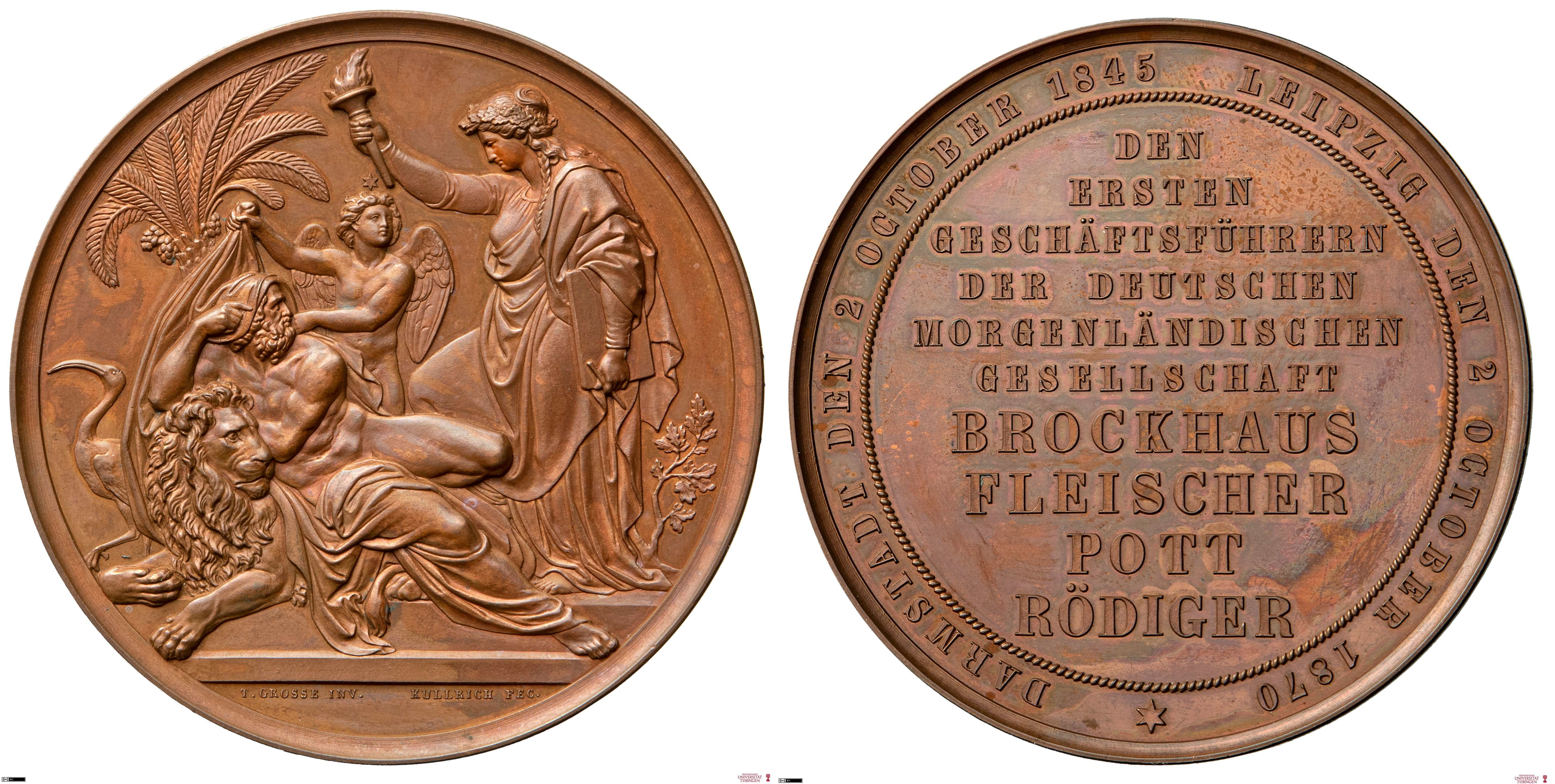
Medal Brockhaus, Fleischer, Pott, Roediger 1870

Hermann Brockhaus (28 January 1806 – 5 January 1877) was a German Orientalist born in Amsterdam. He was a leading authority on Sanskrit and Persian languages. He was the son of publisher Friedrich Arnold Brockhaus and brother-in-law to composer Richard Wagner. In 1870 he received a combined medal (together with (Fleischer, Pott and Rödiger) in occasion of the 25th anniversary of the DMG.

== Academic career ==
He studied Oriental languages at the Universities of Leipzig, Göttingen and Bonn where he was a student of August Wilhelm von Schlegel, the founder of German Indology. Afterwards he spent several years in France and England. In 1839 he was appointed associate professor of oriental languages at the University of Jena, teaching Sanskrit and Hebrew beginning in the summer term of 1840. Together with his colleague Johann Gustav Stickel (who taught Semitic languages), Brockhaus established oriental philology at the School of Humanities at Jena. In 1841 Brockhaus followed an appointment to Leipzig, where in 1848 he was appointed a full professor of ancient Indian language at the university. After his death, he was succeeded at the university by Ernst Windisch.

== Published works ==
Among his better-known works are an edition of Kathâsarit-sâgara (a large collection of tales by Somadeva) and an edition of songs by the Persian lyric poet Hafez (Lieder des Hafis). He also published an edition of the Vendidâd Sâde, an edition of a philosophical drama by Krishna Mishra called Prabodhachandrodaya and was the author of the influential Über den Druck sanskritischer Werke mit lateinischen Buchstaben (Concerning Sanskrit Works Printed in Latin Letters).

From 1853 he was editor of the Zeitschrift der Deutschen Morgenländischen Gesellschaft (Journal of the German Oriental Society), and for a period of time was editor of the Ersch-Gruber Allgemeine Encyklopädie.
