= Eduard Brockhaus =

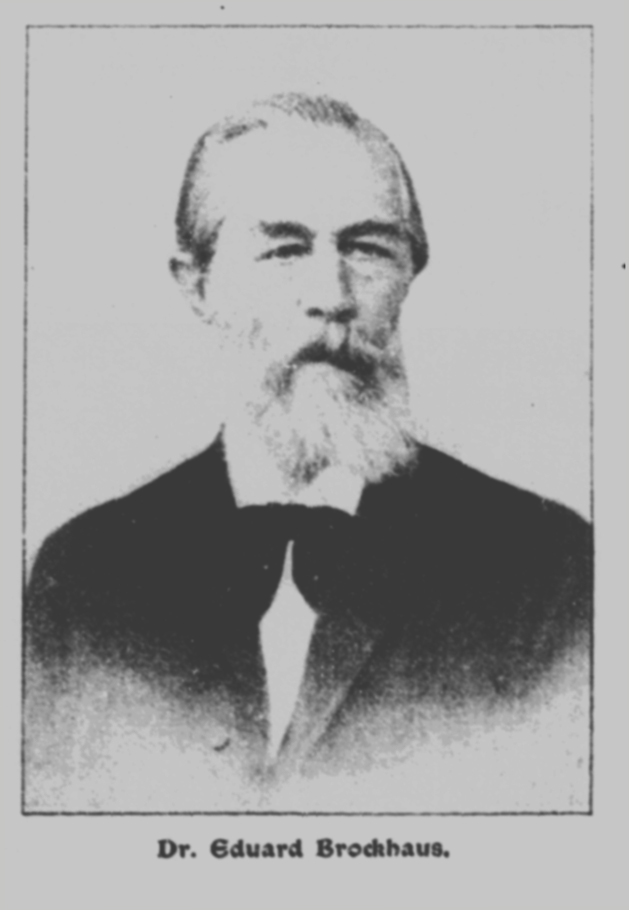
- ca. 1905
- Born: 7 August 1829; Leipzig, Saxony
- Died: 11 January 1914; Leipzig, Saxony, Germany
- Education: Leipzig; Heidelberg; Berlin
- Occupations: publisher editor politician
- Political party: NLP
- Spouse: Maria Emilia Victoria von Weiß (1836-1914)
- Children: Albert Brockhaus (1855-1921); Heinrich Brockhaus (1858-1941) and others
- Parent(s): Heinrich Brockhaus (1804-1874); Therese Pauline Campe (1808–1886)

Eduard Brockhaus (7 August 1829 – 11 January 1914) was a German publisher and politician.

== Life ==
Heinrich Eduard Brockhaus was born into a Protestant family in Leipzig. He was one of the five recorded children, and the eldest of the three sons, of the publisher-politician Heinrich Brockhaus (1804-1874) by his marriage to Pauline Campe (1808–86).

He was sent for his education to the boarding school at Schnepfenthal (near Gotha) between 1837 and 1842. Thereafter, till 1847 he was sent to study at the prestigious St. Thomas School back in Leipzig. After that he attended university in Leipzig, Heidelberg and Berlin. It was at Leipzig that in 1850 he received his doctorate. By this time he had decided to follow his father into the publishing business, and was apprenticed into the family business, which produced books and journals. After only two years he was entrusted with management responsibilities ("...Prokura") and became a full partner in the business when aged just twenty-five. For the next twenty years he worked alongside his father, which provided abundant learning opportunities and also enabled him to provide support in helping to build and develop the business further. Further family support was provided when his younger brother Rudolf joined the business in 1864. Rudolf's responsibilities focused especially on the firm's printing operation while Eduard concentrated on the management and commercial aspects of the operation. By 1894 the firm was operating 30 "fast presses" and one rotary press. After their father died in 1874 Eduard and Rudolf took over the business jointly. Later they were joined by Eduard's son, Albert Brockhaus in 1881 and by his nephew, another Rudolf Brockhaus, in 1889.

Between 1857 and 1863 Eduard Brockhaus was also himself editing the Deutsche Allgemeine Zeitung (newspaper).

Like his father before him, Eduard Brockhaus also participated in the business community more widely. In 1872 was elected to the presidency of the Leipzig-based German Book Printers' Association ("Deutscher Buchdruckerverein") in succession to Albin Ackermann, holding the position continually between 1873 and 1886. He also presided over the "Leipzig Association of Book Dealers" (der "Verein der Buchhändler zu Leipzig") between 1880 and 1894. He was also a leading figure in the Association of German Book Dealers' Exchanges ("Börsenverein der Deutschen Buchhändler zu Leipzig"), serving as the association's secretary and then as chief executive ("Vorsteher") between 1892 and 1895. Subsequently, he remained engaged with the association as an honorary member. His proposals triggered a major reconfiguration in the way the book exchanges - and therefore the book trade in Germany - operated, even though he was for several years sceptical over the various changes introduced during the 1880s. The reforms were led by Adolf Kröner: they involved an newly prescriptive set of rules for the books trade, including the so-called "Book trading and transfer regulations" ("Buchhändlerische Verkehrsordnung") which involved fixed pricing, and meant fundamental changes to the ways in which publishers interacted with wholesalers, the ways in which wholesalers interacted with book retailers, and the way the books trade interacted with the public. Eduard Brockhaus saw the need for some sort of structure, and in the end he was won round to Adolf Kröner's reforms, becoming a stalwart backer. It was indeed Adolf von Kröner (ennobled in 1905) who succeeded Eduard Brockhaus as president of the Book Exchanges' Association.

Brockhaus also engaged in national politics. Following unification, on 3 March 1871 he was elected to the Reichstag, in which he participated as an NLP member, representing the Zschopau-Marienberg-Lengefeld electoral district ("Wahlkreis 20"). He was re-elected in 1874 and again in 1877. (In 1878 the seat fell to the Socialist Workers' Party.) He was a member of several parliamentary committees and played an important role in the formulation of press and copyright legislation. Brockhaus was a backer and huge admirer of Chancellor Bismarck, at whose home he was a regular visitor after Bismarck's departure from office in 1890. He also numbered Helmuth von Moltke among his friends.

== Personal ==
Eduard Brockhaus married Emilia "Milly" Weiß on 4 September 1854 in Budapest. She came from a Roman Catholic banking family based in Hungary. The marriage resulted in the recorded births of six sons. These included the publisher-politician Albert Brockhaus (1855-1921) and the art-historian Heinrich Brockhaus (1858-1941).
