= Hans Stumme =

German linguist

Hans Stumme (3 November 1864 in Mittweida – 20 December 1936 in Dresden) was a German linguist, known for his research of Semitic and other Afroasiatic languages.

He studied at the universities of Tübingen, Halle, Leipzig and Strasbourg, obtaining his habilitation in 1895. While a student at Leipzig, his teachers were Ludolf Krehl, Albert Socin and Friedrich Delitzsch. In 1900 he became an associate professor of Oriental philology at Leipzig, where in 1909 he was named an honorary professor of Neo-Arabic and Hamitic languages.

He taught classes on Arabic literature and dialects of the Maghreb; and also gave lectures on Persian, Turkish, Maltese, Ge'ez, Hausa and Berber languages. He was an editor of the Zeitschrift der Deutschen Morgenländischen Gesellschaft (Journal of the German Oriental Society).

== Selected works ==
- Märchen der Schluḥ von Tázerwalt. (Transliteration and translation of Berber legends), 1891.
- Tunisische Maerchen und Gedichte, 1893 – Tunisian tales and poems.
- Tripolitanisch-tunisische Beduinenlieder, 1894 – Tripolitanian-Tunisian Bedouin songs.
- Chants des Bédouins de Tripoli et de la Tunisie, 1894 – Chants of Bedouins from Tripoli and Tunisia.
- Grammatik des tunisischen Arabisch nebst Glossar, 1896 – Grammar of Tunisian-Arabic with glossary.
- Märchen und gedichte aus der stadt Tripolis in Nordafrika, 1898 – Tales and poems from the city of Tripoli in North Africa.
- Handbuch des Schilhischen von Tazerwalt. Grammatik, Lesestück, Gespräche, Glossar, 1899 – Handbook of the Shilha language of Tazeroualt; grammar, reading passages, dialogs, glossary.
- Märchen der Berbern von Tamazratt in Südtunisien, 1900 – Tales of the Berbers from Tamezret in southern Tunisia.
- Arabisch, Persisch und Türkisch in den Grundzügen der Laut- und Formenlehre, 1902 – Arabic, Persian and Turkish in a general outline of phonology and morphology.
- Maltesische Märchen, Gedichte und Rätsel in deutscher Übersetzung, 1904 – Maltese stories: poems and riddles in German translation.
- Maltesische Studien; eine Sammlung prosaischer und poetischer Texte in maltesischer Sprache nebst Erläuterungen, 1904 – Maltese studies; a collection of prose and poetic texts in Maltese.
- Türkische Schrift; ein Übungsheft zum Schreibenlernen des Türkischen, 1916 – Turkish writing; an exercise book for learning how to write Turkish.
