= August Friedrich Pott =

German linguist (1802–1887)

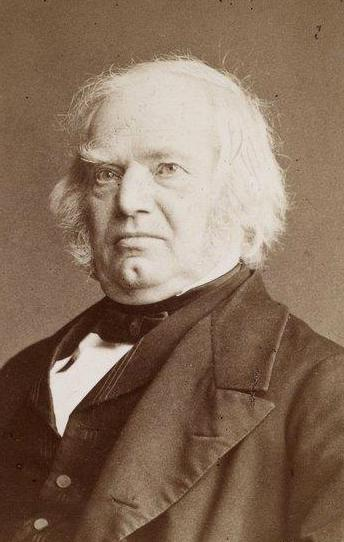
Portrait, 1883

August Friedrich Pott (14 November 1802 in Nettelrede, Hanover – 5 July 1887 in Halle) was a German pioneer in linguistics.

== Life ==
Pott was a theology student at the University of Göttingen, where he became interested in philology, philosophy, and history. He became a schoolmaster in Celle, but completed his doctoral dissertation, De relationibus quae praepositionibus in Linguis denotantur, in 1827 at Göttingen University. As he was not satisfied giving classes in Celle, he went to the University of Berlin to study with Franz Bopp, an important pioneer in Indo-European linguistics. He became an unsalaried lecturer in general linguistics there in 1830, after having completed his habilitation, and became the professor of general linguistics at the University of Halle in 1833, where he remained for the rest of his life. He was a cofounder of the Deutsche Morgenländische Gesellschaft, which aims at promoting research on oriental languages.

== Work ==
Pott lectured mainly on general linguistics, philosophy of language and historical grammatic. Additionally, he offered lectures on Sanskrit, Chinese and hieroglyphs. In his research, he focused on Indo-European languages. He coined the term Iranian languages. His works, notably Etymologische Forschungen (1834–1836), established the modern etymological studies on the basis of the correspondence of sounds occurring in related words in the Indo-European languages. The first volume appeared in two volumes, and the second edition (1841–76) was expanded to six volumes. He also published on onomastics, and counting systems. He is also considered the nineteenth century's most important philologist of Romany, the language of the Romani people. Pott's growing work on Romani languages motivated Friedrich Christian Diez to publish his work more quickly, so the result was an increase in analysis of Romani languages.

He vehemently criticized politization or mystical interpretation of linguistics (e.g. in Anti-Kaulen: Oder mystische Vorstellungen vom Ursprung der Völker und Sprachen 1863) and therefore, rejected Arthur de Gobineau's book Versuch über die Ungleichheit der Menschenrassen ('Essay on the inequality of the races') as lacking a scientific base.

== Honors ==
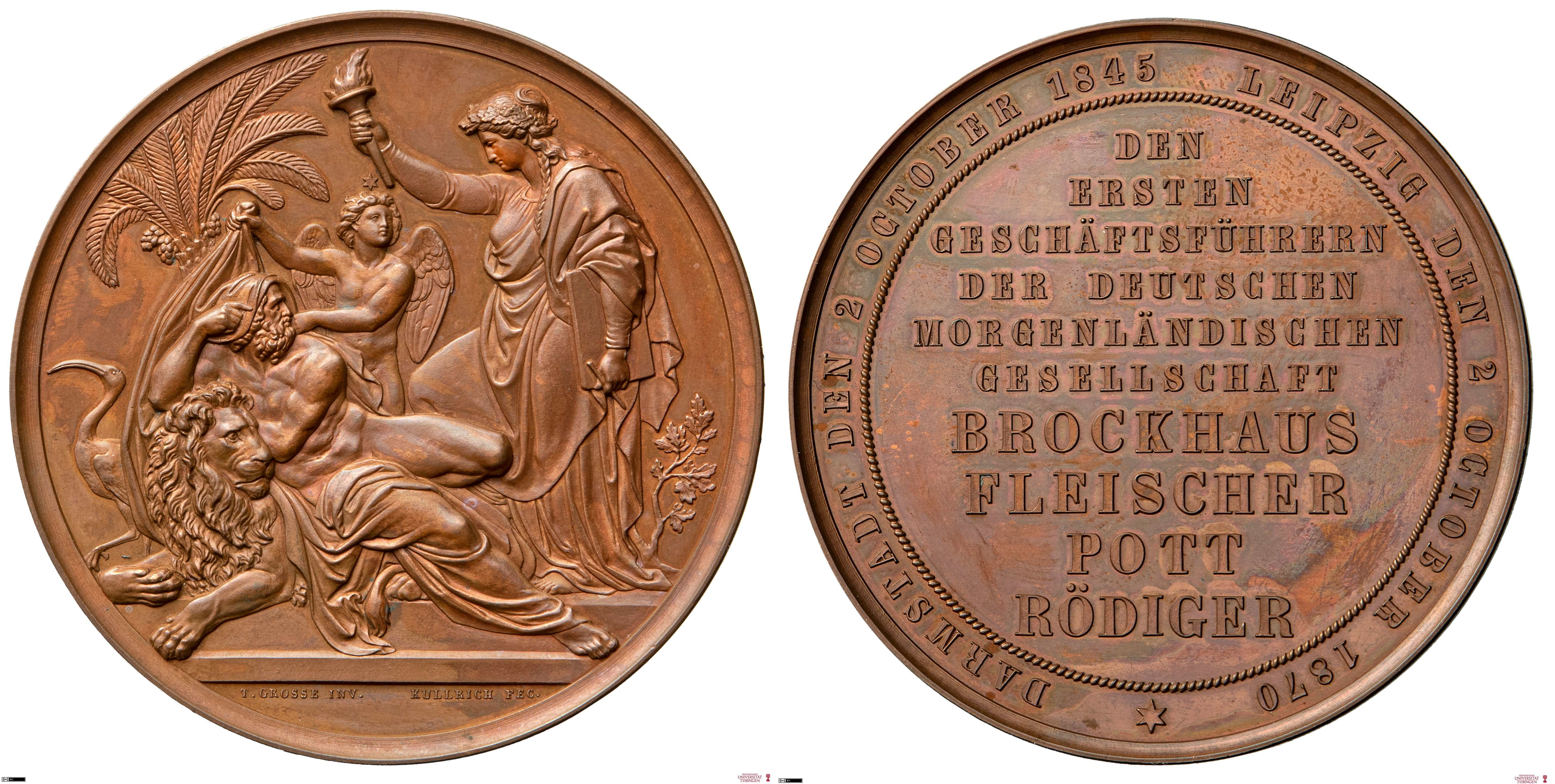
Medal Brockhaus, Fleischer, Pott, Roediger 1870

He was awarded the Prussian Order of the Red Eagle 2nd class, the Pour le Mérite, and the Russian Order of Saint Stanislaus (House of Romanov) 1st class. In 1850, he became a corresponding member of the Prussian Academy of Sciences and in 1877, he became a foreign member. He also became a corresponding member of the Russian Academy of Sciences in 1855, a foreign member of the Bavarian Academy of Sciences and Humanities in 1870, and a foreign member Göttingen Academy of Sciences and Humanities in 1876.

In 1870 he received a combined medal (together with Brockhaus, Fleischer and Rödiger) in occasion of the 25th anniversary of the DMG.

== Relevant reading ==
- Bologna, Maria Patrizia. "Langage et expressivité chez August Friedrich Pott." Historiographia linguistica 22, no. 1-2 (1995): 75–90.
- Leopold, Joan. The Letter Liveth: The life, work and library of August Friedrich Pott (1802 87). Vol. 9. John Benjamins Publishing, 1983.
- Malkiel, Yakov. "August Friedrich Pott as a Pioneer of Romance Linguistics." American Indian and Indoeuropean Studies: Papers in honor of Madison S. Beeler (1980): 409–420.
