= Meyers Blitz-Lexikon =

German print encyclopedia

Meyers Blitz-Lexikon is a German print encyclopedia published in 1932. It was a concise single-volume version of the long-established Meyers Lexicon. The name refers to the need for very rapid (Blitz = "Lightning") information.

By limiting the explanations to a few keywords and making heavy use of abbreviations, a large number of entries were compressed into the single portable volume. Even complex topics were explained in just a few sentences.

It was published to accompany the 15-volume version of the 7th edition of Meyers Lexicon. The volume contained eight plates, 2,481 illustrations in the text and 71 coloured panels, forming a 759-page lexicon with over 45,000 entries.
