= Deutsche Morgenländische Gesellschaft =

German scholarly organization dedicated to Oriental studies

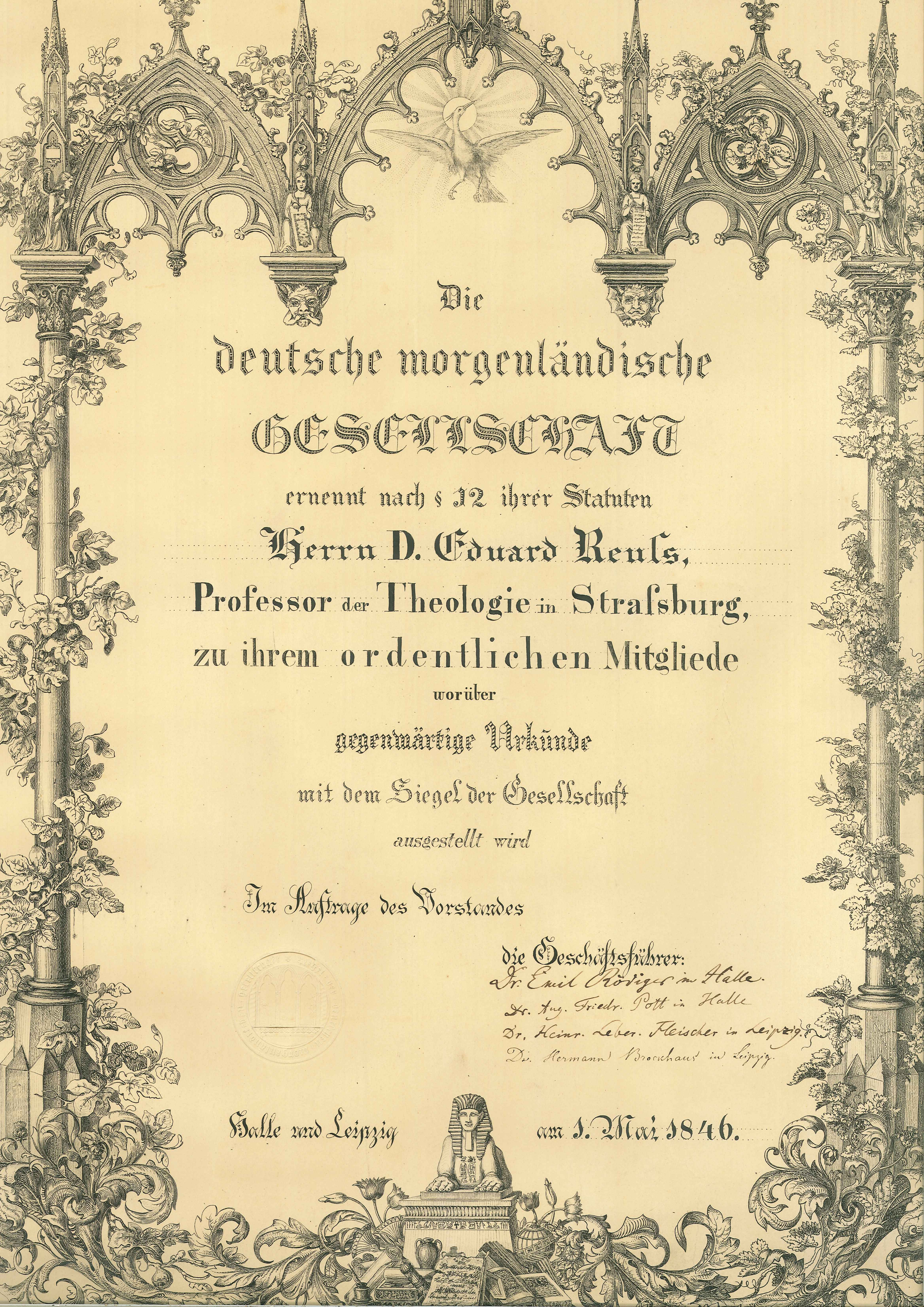
Deutsche Morgenländische Gesellschaft. Certificate of appointment issued to Eduard Reuss in 1846.

The Deutsche Morgenländische Gesellschaft (German: [ˈdɔʏtʃə ˈmɔʁɡənˌlɛndɪʃə ɡəˈzɛlʃaft], German Oriental Society), abbreviated DMG, is a scholarly organization dedicated to Oriental studies, that is, to the study of the languages and cultures of the Near East and the Far East, the broader Orient, Asia, Oceania, and Africa.

The DMG was established on 2 October 1845 in Leipzig by leading Oriental scholars from Germany, as well as members of other Orientalist societies such as the Asiatic Societies in Paris (the Société Asiatique), London (the Royal Asiatic Society), and Calcutta (the Asiatic Society). It was founded "to promote all aspects of the knowledge of Asia and of the countries closely related to it in every aspect, and to propagate participation of this in wider circles. Hence the Society will deal not only with oriental literature (morgenländische Literatur) but also with the history of these countries and the research of their situation both earlier and more recent times."

The DMG has traditionally concentrated on the "knowledge of languages, literatures, history, religions and philosophies, forms of law and society, archaeology, and the art and material culture of the people living in these areas". In recent years, its scope has expanded to include sociology and political science as well. The academic disciplines represented in the DMG include the following: Ancient Near Eastern studies, Semitic languages, Jewish studies, Arabic studies, Islamic studies, the study of Oriental Christianity, Persian studies and Iranian studies, Indology, Turkish studies, Central Asian studies, Indo-European studies, Mongolian studies, Tibetan studies, Sinology, Japanese studies, Southeast Asian studies, and African studies.

The publishing program of the DMG consists of its internationally renowned journal, the Zeitschrift der Deutschen Morgenländischen Gesellschaft (ZDMG), published since 1847, and its monograph series, Abhandlungen für die Kunde des Morgenlandes (AKM), published since 1857, as well as the Beiruter Texte und Studien (BTS), which have been published since 1964.

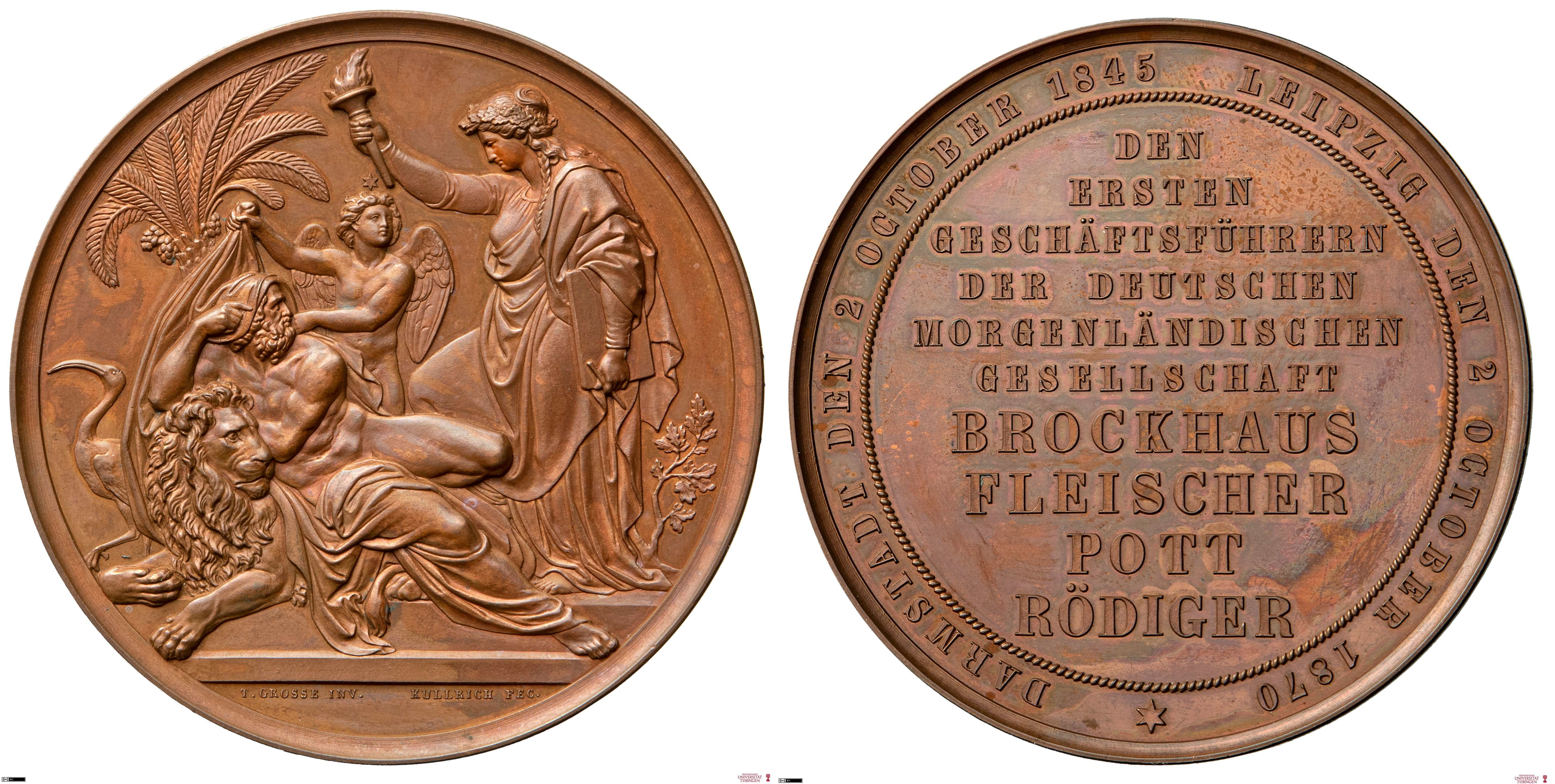
Medaille Brockhaus, Fleischer, Pott, Roediger 1870

In 1870 on the occasion of their 25th anniversary they commissioned a medal to honour their first secretarys of the DMG Hermann Brockhaus, Emil Rödiger, Heinrich Leberecht Fleischer and August Friedrich Pott. The frontside shows an image in a neo-classical style designed by Theodor Grosse.

Beginning in 1921, every three to five years the DMG has organized the "Deutschen Orientalistentag" (DOT), a congress of Oriental studies open to all German and foreign specialists in the field.

The DMG has been based since 2006 in Halle (Saale). It maintains a research library there with more than 66,000 titles and a photographic collection.

The Lidzbarski Gold Medal for Semitic Philology is awarded annually by the German Oriental Society for work in Semitic studies and named in after Mark Lidzbarski.

== Some members ==
- Johannes Benzing (1913–2001)
- Carl Brockelmann (1886–1956)
- Hermann Brockhaus (1806–1877)
- Gustav Droysen (1838–1908)
- Heinrich Ewald (1803–1875)
- Heinrich Leberecht Fleischer (1801–1888)
- Johann Fück (1894–1974)
- Hans Conon von der Gabelentz (1807–1874)
- Herrmann Jungraithmayr (* 1931)
- Angelika Neuwirth (* 1943)
- Justus Olshausen (1800–1882)
- Richard Pischel (1849–1908)
- August Friedrich Pott (1802–1887)
- Emil Rödiger (1801–1874)
- Friedrich Schrader (1865–1922)
- Hans Stumme (1864–1936)
