= Brockhaus Enzyklopädie =

German-language encyclopedia

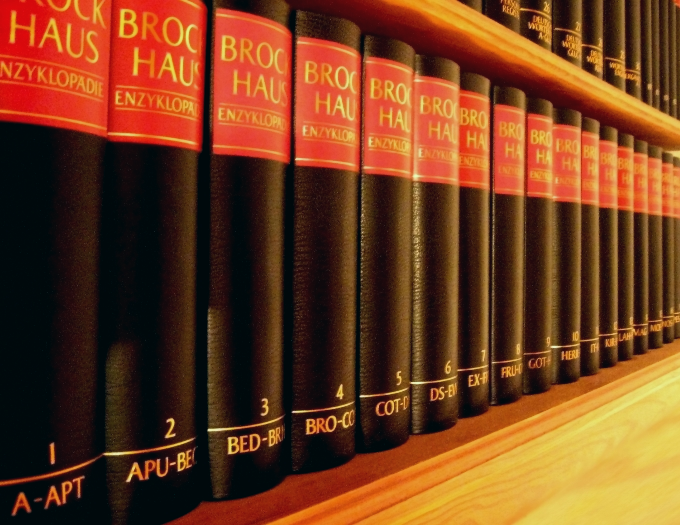
- Brockhaus Encyclopedia
- Author: Friedrich Arnold Brockhaus
- Language: German
- Subject: General
- Genre: Encyclopedia
- Publisher: F. A. Brockhaus AG
- Publication date: First edition in 1796–1808; Last print edition in 2005–2006
- Publication place: Germany
- Media type: 30 volumes, hardbound (21st edition, 2006); after 2006 unavailable in print, but available online
- Pages: 24,500 (21st edition, 2006)
- ISBN: 978-3-76-531102-4
- OCLC: 32477821
- Website: https://brockhaus.de/ecs/

The Brockhaus Enzyklopädie (German for Brockhaus Encyclopedia) is a German-language encyclopedia which until 2009 was published by the F. A. Brockhaus printing house.

The first edition originated in the Conversations-Lexikon published by Renatus Gotthelf Löbel and C.W. Franke in Leipzig 1796–1808. Renamed Der Große Brockhaus in 1928 and Brockhaus Enzyklopädie from 1966, the 21st thirty-volume edition contains about 300,000 entries on about 24,000 pages, with about 40,000 maps, graphics and tables. It is the largest German-language printed encyclopedia in the 21st century.

In 2008, F. A. Brockhaus began the changeover to an online encyclopedia and the discontinuation of the printed editions. The rights to the Brockhaus trademark were purchased by Arvato, a subsidiary of the Bertelsmann media group. After more than 200 years, the distribution of the Brockhaus encyclopedia ceased completely in 2014.

== History ==
Paralleling other 18th century encyclopedias, the scope of the original Conversations-Lexikon was expanded beyond that of earlier publications, in an effort to become comprehensive. Published by the Leipzig scholars Renatus Gotthelf Löbel (1767–1799) and Christian Wilhelm Franke (1765–1831) from 1796 onward, it included geography, history, and in part biography, as well as the more typical mythology, philosophy, natural history, etc.

Upon Löbel's death in 1799, Franke sold the rights to publication to Friedrich Arnold Brockhaus (1772–1823). The deal was made at the Leipzig Book Fair on 25 October 1808 for the price of 1,800 thalers.

In 1984, F.A. Brockhaus merged with the Bibliographisches Institut (Mannheim) (BIM). After the merger, it was decided that former BIM serial reference works such as Meyers Konversations-Lexikon would henceforth be marketed under the name of Brockhaus.

=== Full print editions ===
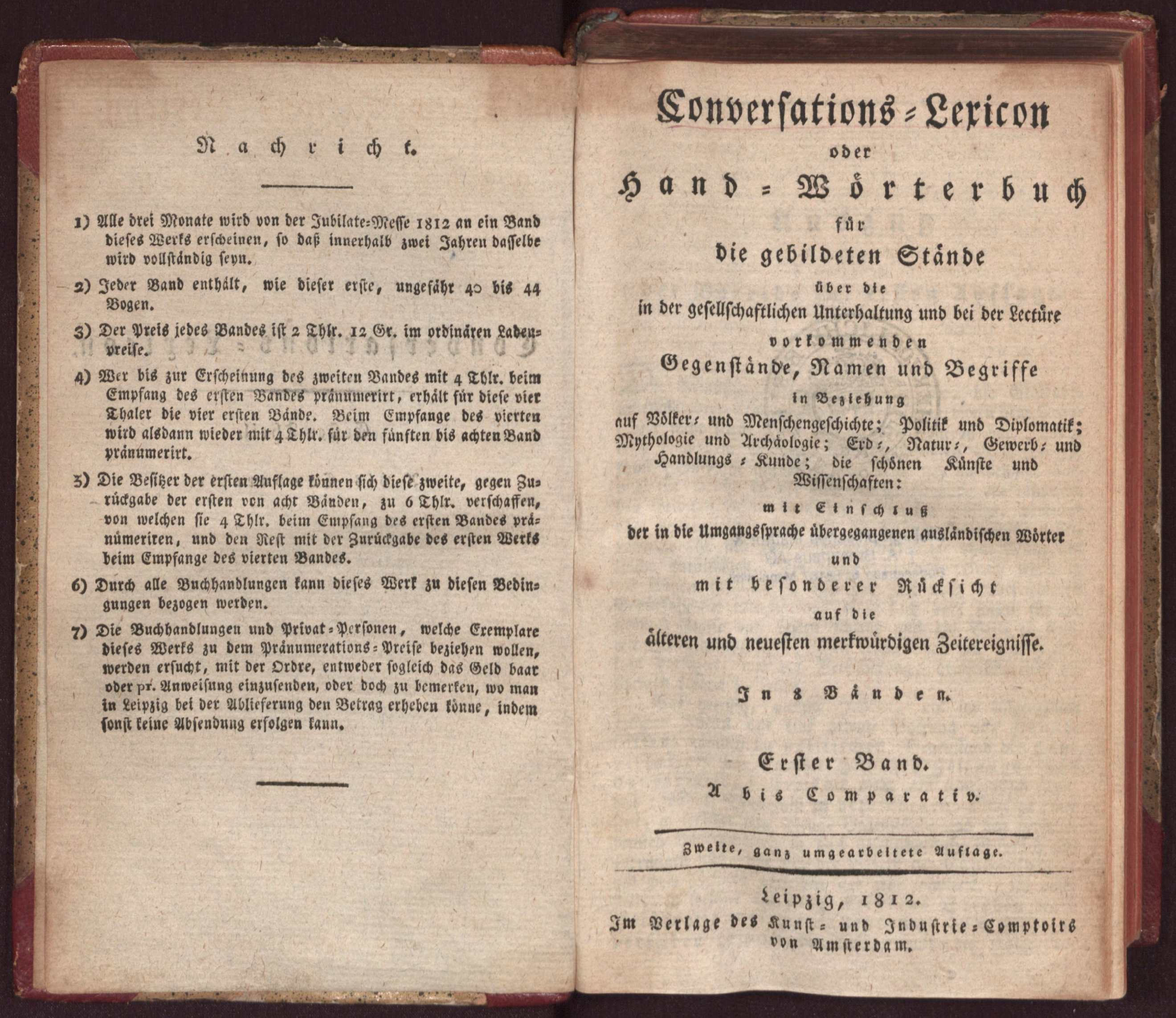
Title page of the 2nd edition (1812)

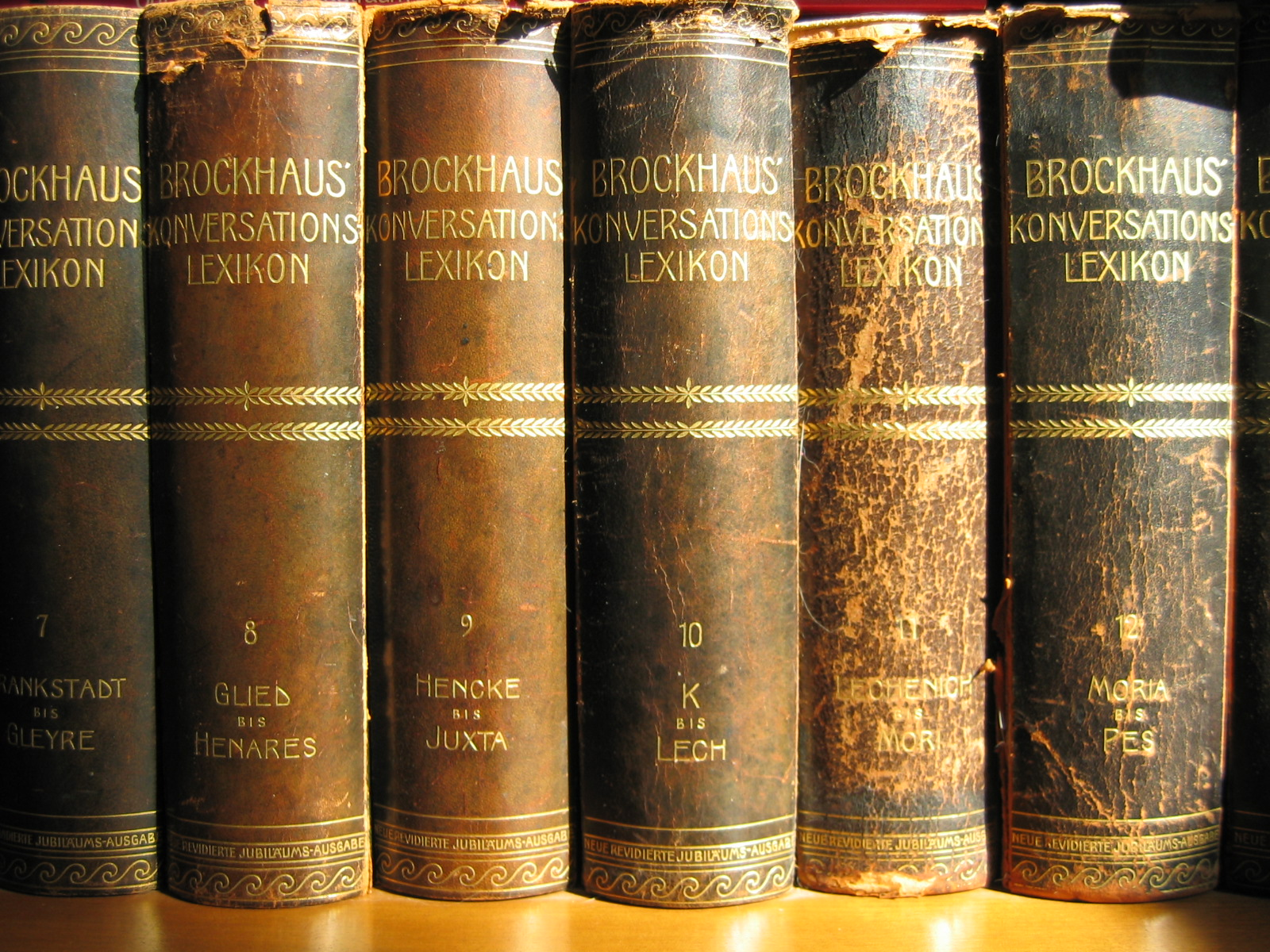
Brockhaus' Konversations-Lexikon, 14th edition, c. 1910

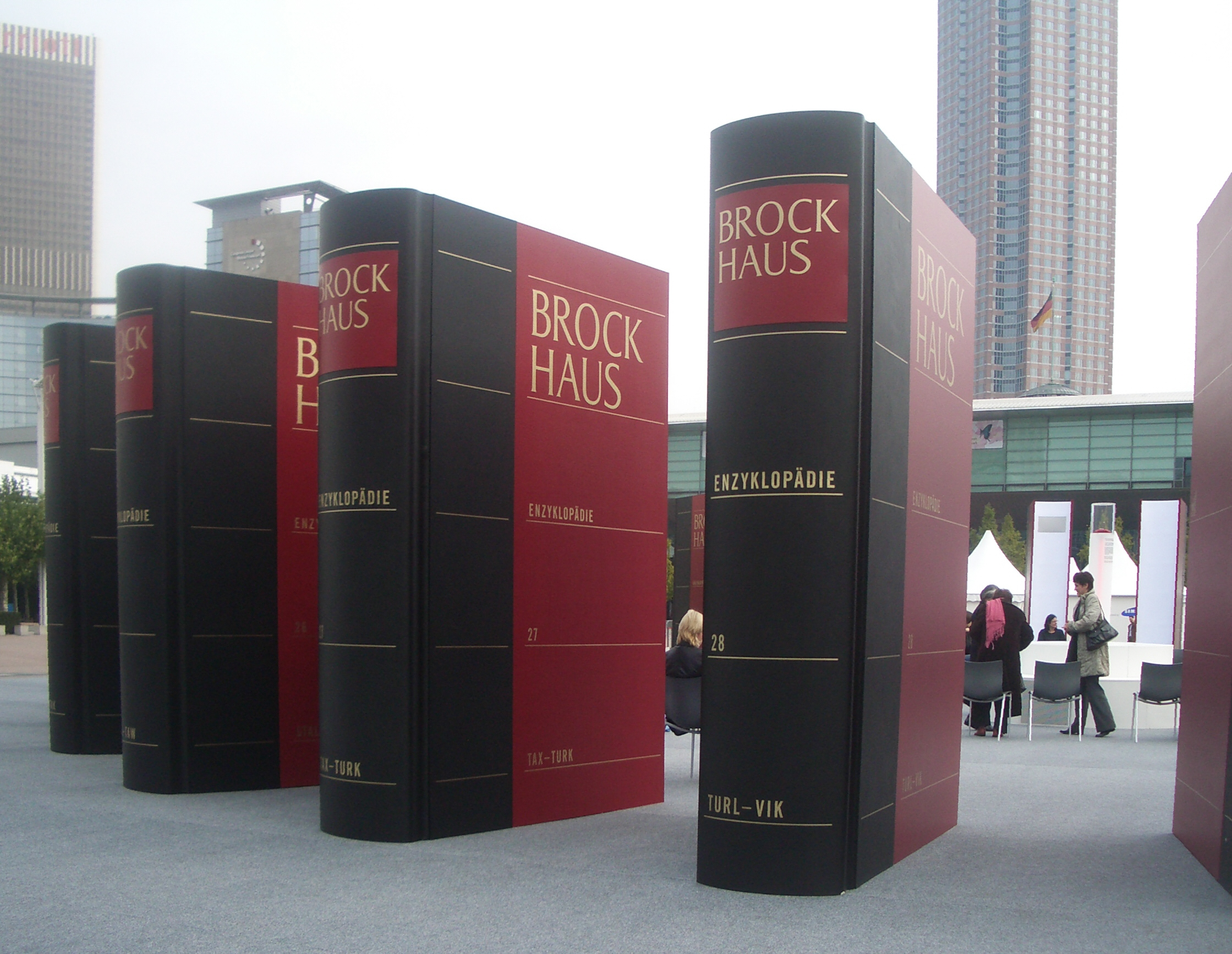
Brockhaus advertising at the Frankfurt Book Fair in 2005

Thirteen editions were issued during the 19th century. The articles, often very brief, were considered excellent and trustworthy, especially on German subjects, gave references to the best books, and included biographies of living men.

At first the name of the encyclopedia remained Konversationslexikon or Allgemeine deutsche Real-Encyklopädie für die gebildeten Stände ("General German encyclopedia for the educated"); only with the 13th edition did the name Brockhaus appear in the title, and the last edition is titled Brockhaus Enzyklopädie.

Christian Wilhelm Franke was to finish volume VI of the Leipzig publication by December 1808, and the already projected supplement, in 2 volumes, by 1811. Brockhaus himself edited the 2nd edition (1812–1819, 10 vols.), and, when vol. IV was published, the 3rd (1814–1819). Ludwig Ham assisted in editing the 4th and 5th editions until he left Leipzig in April 1820, when Professor F.C. Hasse took his place. Brockhaus died in 1823, and his two eldest sons, Friedrich and Heinrich, edited the 6th edition with Hasse's assistance in September 1823. Hasse edited the 7th edition. Karl August Espe edited the 8th and 9th editions.

August Kurtzel, aided by Oskar Pilz, edited the 10th edition, assisted by Heinrich Eduard Brockhaus, and Heinrich Rudolf Brockhaus, the younger son, assisted in the 11th edition. Kurtzel died on April 24, 1871, and Pilz was sole editor until March 1872, when Gustav Stockmann joined, who was alone from April until joined by Karl Wippermann in October.

The 14th edition was published in 1894, featuring 18,842 pages in 16 regular volumes and one supplement volume.

Preparations for the 15th edition were disrupted by World War I, and recommenced in 1925. Because its 20 volumes (15,800 pages) were published from 1928–1934 which covered the period of the Weimar Republic, this edition is sometimes referred to as the Weimar Brockhaus. A supplement volume was published in 1935.

The 16th edition, published 1952–1957, consisted of 12 regular volumes, two supplement volumes, and one atlas volume.

The latest (2005–2006) full print version of the Brockhaus Enzyklopädie is the 21st edition, with approx. 24,500 pages in 30 volumes. Prices start at EUR 2,820.

=== Abbreviated print editions ===
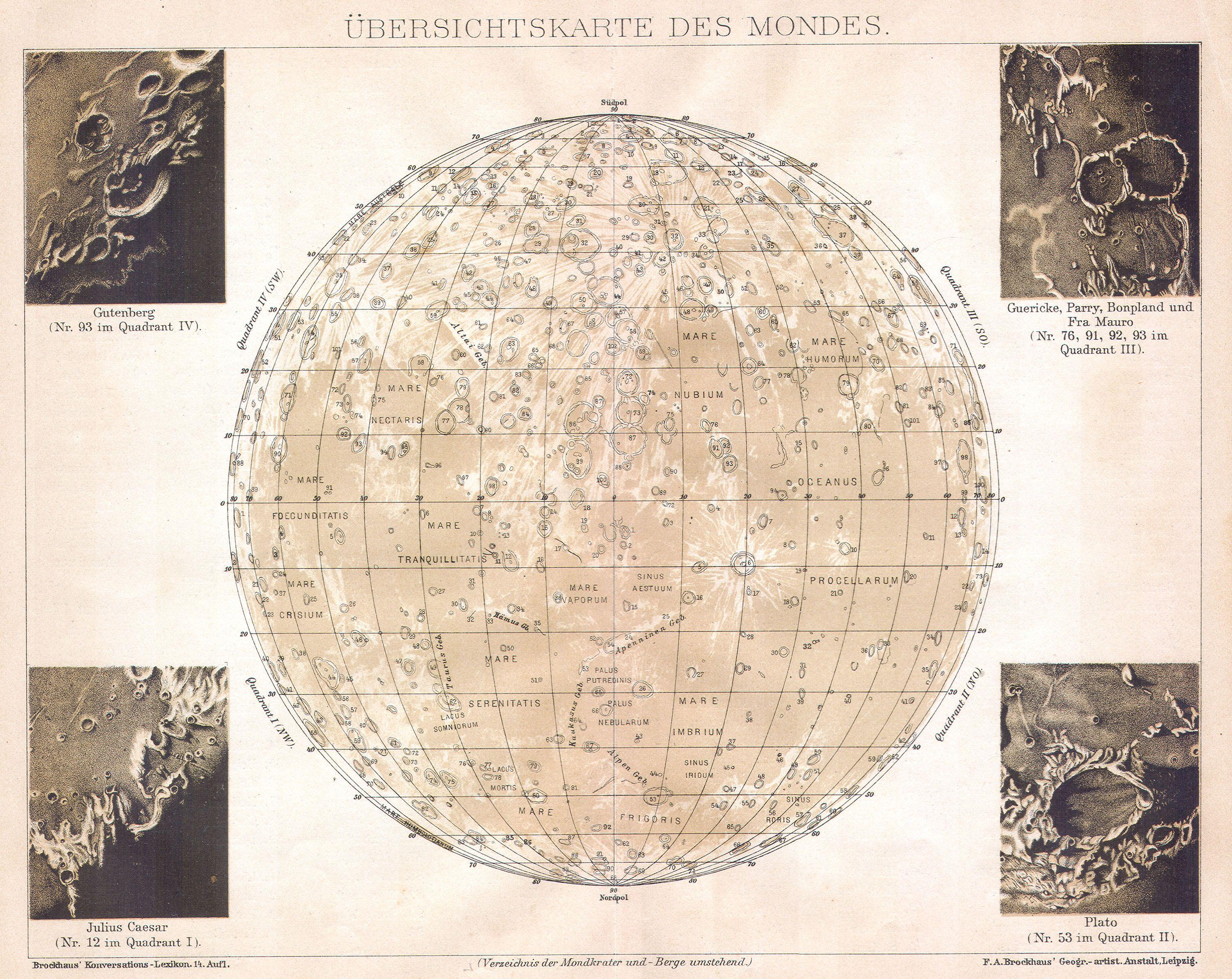
Brockhaus Map of the Moon (1898)

In addition to the full encyclopedia, several abbreviated editions have been published with increasingly condensed content:

- The 1854 Kleineres Brockhaus'sches Conversations-Lexikon für den Hausgebrauch ("Minor Brockhaus Encyclopedia for Home Use") had 4 volumes
- The Brockhaus' Kleines Konversations-Lexikon ("Brockhaus Small Encyclopedia"), multiple editions, was published in two volumes
- Der Volks-Brockhaus ("The People's Brockhaus"), the first single-volume version, was first published in 1931. By 1941, it was in its 9th edition, with 794 pages. The 15th edition, expanded to 1040 pages, was published in 1975.

=== Transition to digital editions ===
QR code with a link to the Brockhaus Enzyklopädie website.

A digital multimedia encyclopedia based on the Brockhaus Enzyklopädie is available under the name Brockhaus Multimedial Premium, which is similar to Microsoft Encarta.

In 2008, due to the disappointing sales figures, Brockhaus initially announced to make the content of the encyclopedia available online, supported by Internet advertising revenues and considered to discontinue print editions. This announcement briefly boosted print sales again and the plans to switch to an on-line only edition were canceled. In 2009 Bibliographisches Institut & F.A. Brockhaus AG (Bifab) sold the Brockhaus brand to Bertelsmann, renamed themselves to Bibliographisches Institut AG, and sacked 50 employees of its Leipzig-based editorial staff. This move was widely interpreted as the end of Brockhaus Enzyklopädie, caused by the competition of Internet-based reference works such as Wikipedia.

== Impact ==
The Encyclopædia Britannica Eleventh Edition wrote that "no work of reference has been more useful and successful, or more frequently copied, imitated and translated, than that known as the Conversations-Lexikon of Brockhaus". The work was intended not for scientific use, but to promote general intellectual improvement by giving the results of research and discovery in a simple and popular form without extended details. This format, a contrast to the Encyclopædia Britannica, was widely imitated by later 19th century encyclopedias in several countries. The seventh edition of the Conversations-Lexikon formed the basis of the Encyclopedia Americana (1829–1833), the first Prins Winkler Prins Geïllustreerde Encyclopaedie (1870–1882) and the Russian Brockhaus and Efron Encyclopedic and other significant American encyclopedia. Other encyclopedias modelled on Brockhaus included the Dutch Winkler Prins Geïllustreerde Encyclopaedie (1870–1882) and the Russian Brockhaus and Efron Encyclopedic Dictionary (1890–1906).

In 2009, Brockhaus had a brand recognition of 93% in Germany.

== Edition history ==
=== 1st–13th ===
- 1st (1796–1808), six volumes, two supplemental volumes in 1810–1811
- 2nd (1809–1811), eight volumes, growing to ten (including supplements) during 1812–1819
- 3rd (1814–1819), ten volumes, supplements for early volumes supplied in 1818 as the overall work neared completion
- 4th (1817–1819), ten volumes, two supplements in 1819–1820
- 5th (1819–1820), ten volumes
- 6th (1824), ten volumes
- 7th (1827), twelve volumes: Allgemeine Deutsche Real-Encyclopädie für die Gebildeten Stände (in German) (7th ed.), Leipzig: Brodhaus, 1827
  - v.1, v.2, v.3, v.4, v.9, v.10, v.12
- 8th (1833–1837), twelve volumes
- 9th (1843–1848), fifteen volumes
- 10th (1851–1855)
  - v.5, v.6, v.11, v.13, v.14, v.15 pt.2
- 11th (1864–1868), two supplements in 1872-1873
- 12th (1875–1879)
- 13th (1882–1887) Brockhaus Conversations-Lexikon

=== 14th–21st ===
- 14th (1893–1897) Brockhaus Konversations-Lexikon
  - Brockhaus' Konversations-Lexikon (in German) (14th ed.). Leipzig: Brockhaus. 1896–1908..
    - v.1 (A–Ast)
    - v.2 (A–Bi)
    - v.3 (B–C)
    - v.4 (Ces–Deut)
    - v.5 (Dev–En)
    - v.6 (Eo(?)–...)
    - v.7
    - v.8 (Gi–He)
    - v.9 (Hf–J)
    - v.10 (K–Leb)
    - v.11 (Lebe–Mor)
    - v.12 (M–P)
    - v.13 (Perugia–Rudersport)
    - v.14 (Rüdesheim–Succus)
    - v.15 (So–Tu)
    - v.16
    - v.17 (supplement) + via HathiTrust
- 15th (1928–1935) Der Große Brockhaus, twenty-two volumes including atlas and index, supplement in 1939
- 16th (1952–1957) Der Große Brockhaus, first post-Hitler publication, 12 volumes, 1 supplement in 3 compartments ("Ergänzungsband 13"), 1 supplement A–Z ("Ergänzungsband 14"), 1 Atlas
- 17th (1966–1974) Brockhaus Enzyklopädie
- 18th (1977–1981) Der Große Brockhaus
- 19th (1986–1994) Brockhaus Enzyklopädie
- (1989) Special edition of the 19th edition, with book design by Friedensreich Hundertwasser (24 Volumes limited to 1840 numbered and signed sets (1800 arab and 40 roman numerals))
- 20th (1996–1999) Brockhaus Die Enzyklopädie
- 21st (2005–2006) Brockhaus Enzyklopädie (starting fall 2005), also available on DVD and thumbdrive
- (2007) Special edition of the 21st edition, with book design by Armin Mueller-Stahl (starting fall 2007)

== See also ==
- Brockhaus and Efron Encyclopedic Dictionary
- Der kleine Brockhaus, a shorter edition of Brockhaus Encyclopedia.
- List of encyclopedias by branch of knowledge
- List of encyclopedias by date
- List of encyclopedias by language § German
- List of online encyclopedias
