= Heinrich Brockhaus =

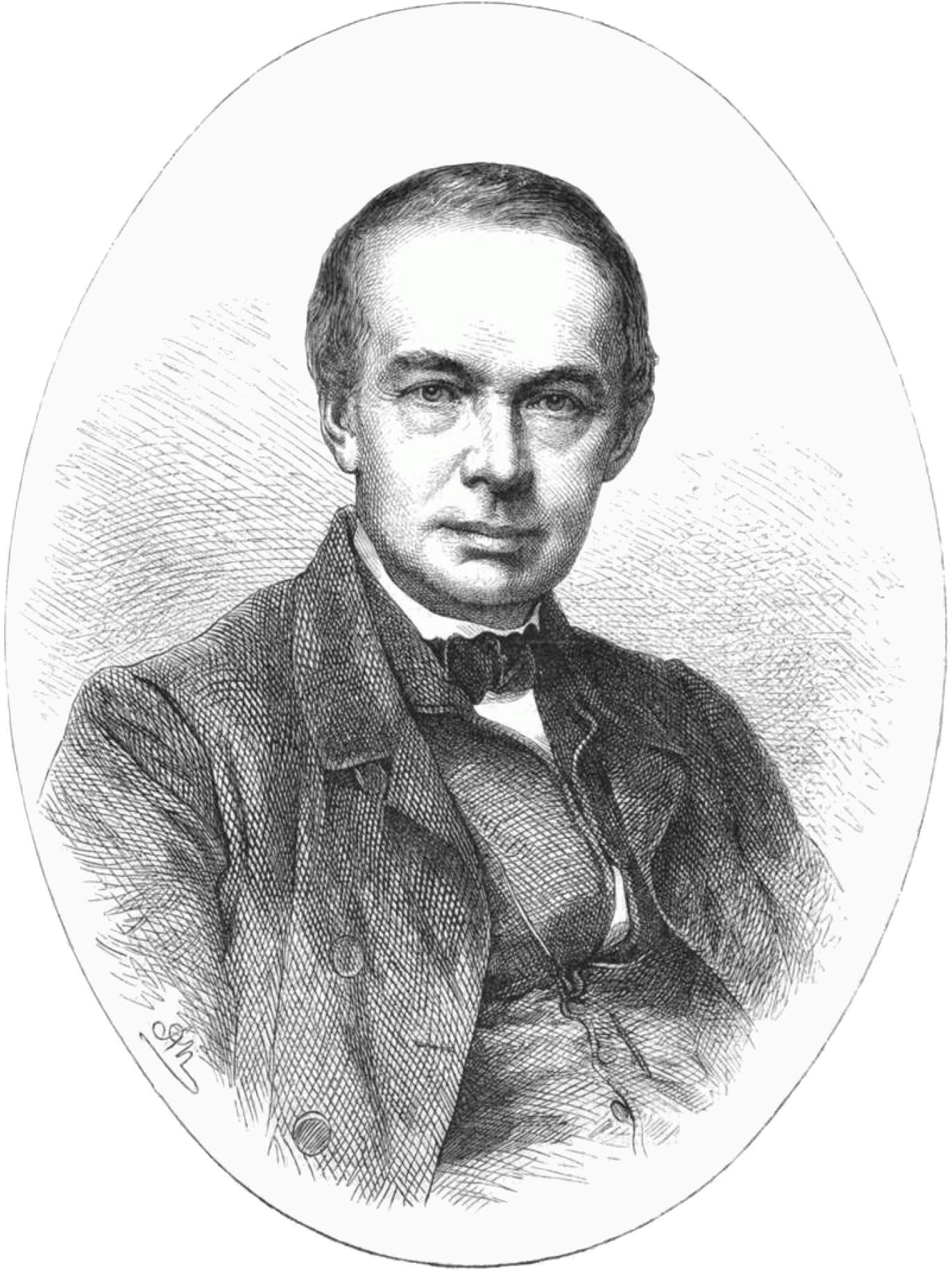
- Heinrich Brockhaus 1867
- Born: 4 February 1804; Amsterdam, Batavian Republic
- Died: 15 November 1874; Leipzig, Germany
- Occupation(s): publisher politician
- Spouse: Therese Pauline Campe
- Children: Marie-Pauline Brockhaus/Judeich (1828-1899) (Heinrich) Eduard Brockhaus (1829-1914; Helene Luise Sophie Brockhaus/Vieweg (1838-1909) (Heinrich) Rudolf Brockhaus (1838-1898); Elisabeth Anna Brockhaus (1843-1886)
- Parent(s): Friedrich Arnold David Brockhaus; Sophie Wilhelmine Arnoldine Beurhaus

Heinrich Brockhaus (4 February 1804 – 15 November 1874) was a German book dealer and publisher who became a liberal politician.

== Life ==
Heinrich Brockhaus was born into a protestant family in Amsterdam, a principal commercial centre in the Batavian Republic (today the Netherlands) where his father had set up his business in 1802 after falling out with a business partner in the family's former home city, Dortmund. Heinrich's father was the German publisher Friedrich Arnold Brockhaus (1772-1823). His mother, born Sophie Wilhelmine Arnoldine Beurhaus, was the daughter of a Dortmund senator (leading politician), Johann Friedrich Beurhaus.

Heinrich and his younger brother, Hermann Brockhaus (1806-1877) were pupils at the prestigious boys' school run by Carl Lang at Schloss Wackerbarth (Wackerbath castle/manor). Heinrich never received any higher education. Nevertheless, he displayed very early an uncommon interest in literature and oratory. At the age of fifteen he was already working in his father's publishing business. He was not yet twenty when his father died suddenly, and he found himself responsible for running his father's business, which by now had become established in Leipzig. Friedrich Arnold Brockhaus (1772-1823), in his will, had given effect to a determination that the business should be run for the benefit of all his heirs, and Heinrich ran it, initially, with his elder brother, Friedrich Brockhaus (1800-1865). Later on the brothers agreed that Heinrich should run the business on his own: Friedrich retired from it and moved away to Dresden.

Under Heinrich's direction, the business flourished. In 1831 he purchased the publishing house J.F. Gledisch, a firm which could trace its origins back to the seventeenth century. In 1837 he launched the "Leipziger Allgemeine Zeitung" (subsequently expanded and later relaunched as the Deutsche Allgemeine Zeitung), a newspaper which under his proprietorship had a reputation as a middle-class liberal publication.

A notable autodidact, Brockhaus traveled widely across Europe, also visiting the near-east and North Africa and always, when travelling, on the look-out for new business opportunities. In the words of one source, he was able to understand seven modern languages, and was at home with literature and the fine arts. The publishing house also expanded internationally, with subsidiaries in Paris, Vienna and beyond. He also took a close interest in authors' rights, a subject in which his involvement continued when he entered into the world of politics.

For many years Brockhaus sat as a member of the Leipzig city parliament. He was also a member of the regional parliament (Landtag) for Saxony in the 1840s. In 1848 he was a member of the Frankfurt "pre-parliament" ("Vorparlament ") which planned the elections to the Frankfurt Parliament. A decade later he was a co-founder of the German National Association ("Deutscher Nationalverein").

== Personal ==
Heinrich Brockhaus married Pauline Campe (1808–86) in Leipzig in 1827. Their five recorded children included Eduard Brockhaus and Rudolf Brockhaus, who between them took over the publishing house after their father's death, and Helene who in 1855 married Heinrich Vieweg, another publisher.

== Wagner connections ==
In 1828 his elder brother, Friedrich Brockhaus married Luise Wagner (1805-1872). His younger brother, Hermann Brockhaus, married Ottilie Wagner (1811-1883) in 1836. The second of these marriages placed Heinrich Brockhaus in the unique and sometimes uncomfortable position of being the brother-in-law to the impecunious composer, Richard Wagner twice over.
