= Emil Rödiger =

German orientalist

Emil Rödiger (13 October 1801, in Sangerhausen – 15 June 1874) was a German orientalist.

He studied philosophy and theology at the University of Halle, where in 1830, he became an associate professor of Oriental languages, followed by a full professorship in 1835. He moved to Berlin in 1860, and remained there for the rest of his life.

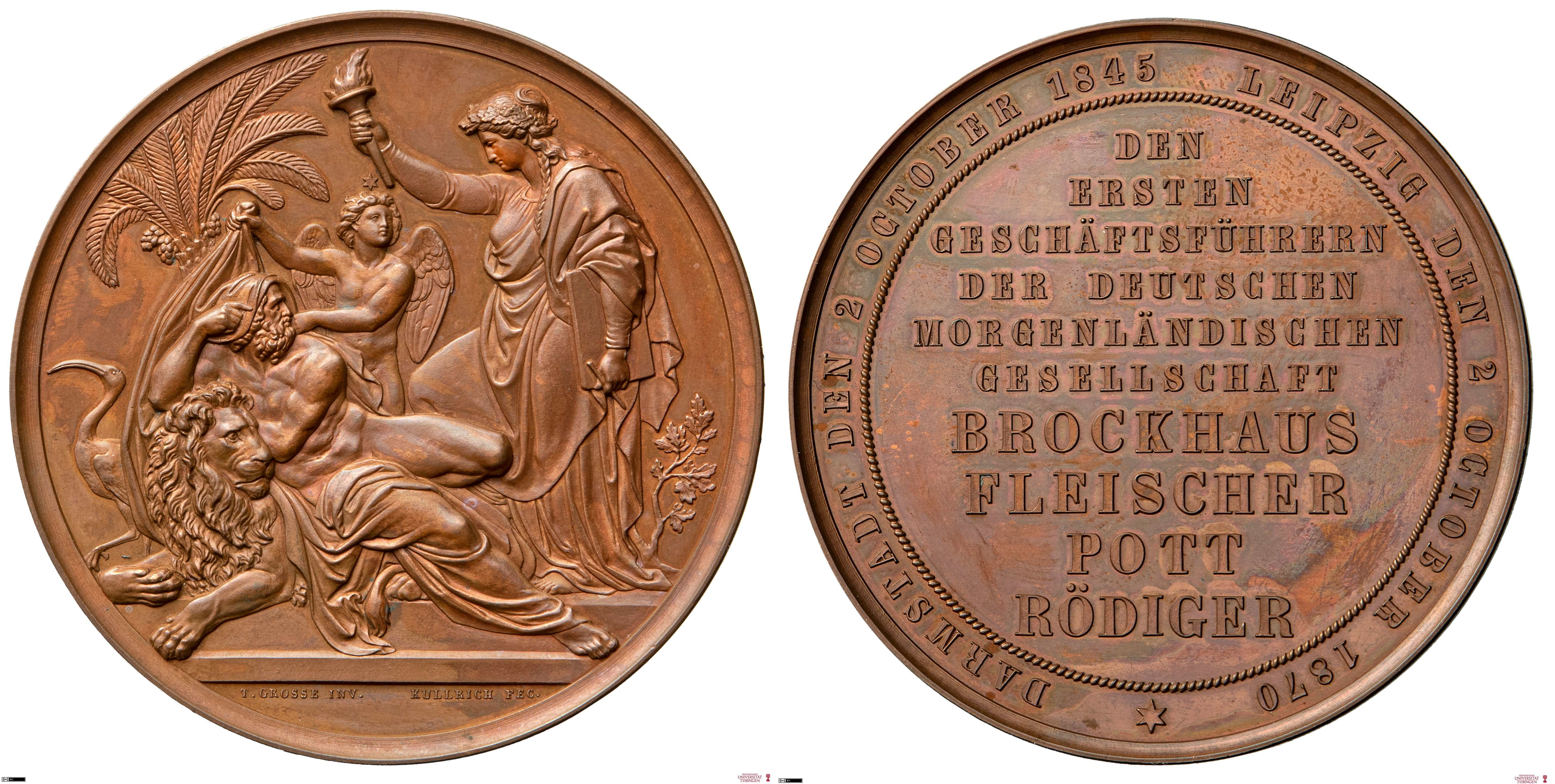
Medal Brockhaus, Fleischer, Pott, Roediger 1870

In 1870 he received a combined medal (together with (Brockhaus, Pott and Fleischer) in occasion of the 25th anniversary of the DMG.

He published a new edition of Lokman's Fables (1830); Syrische Crestomathie (1838); and Versuch über die Himjaritischen Schriftmonumente (1841). After the death of Wilhelm Gesenius (1786–1842), he finished his Thesaurus Linguae Hebraicae, and edited his Hebrew grammar from the 14th (1845) to the 21st edition (1874).
