= Heinrich Leberecht Fleischer =

German orientalist

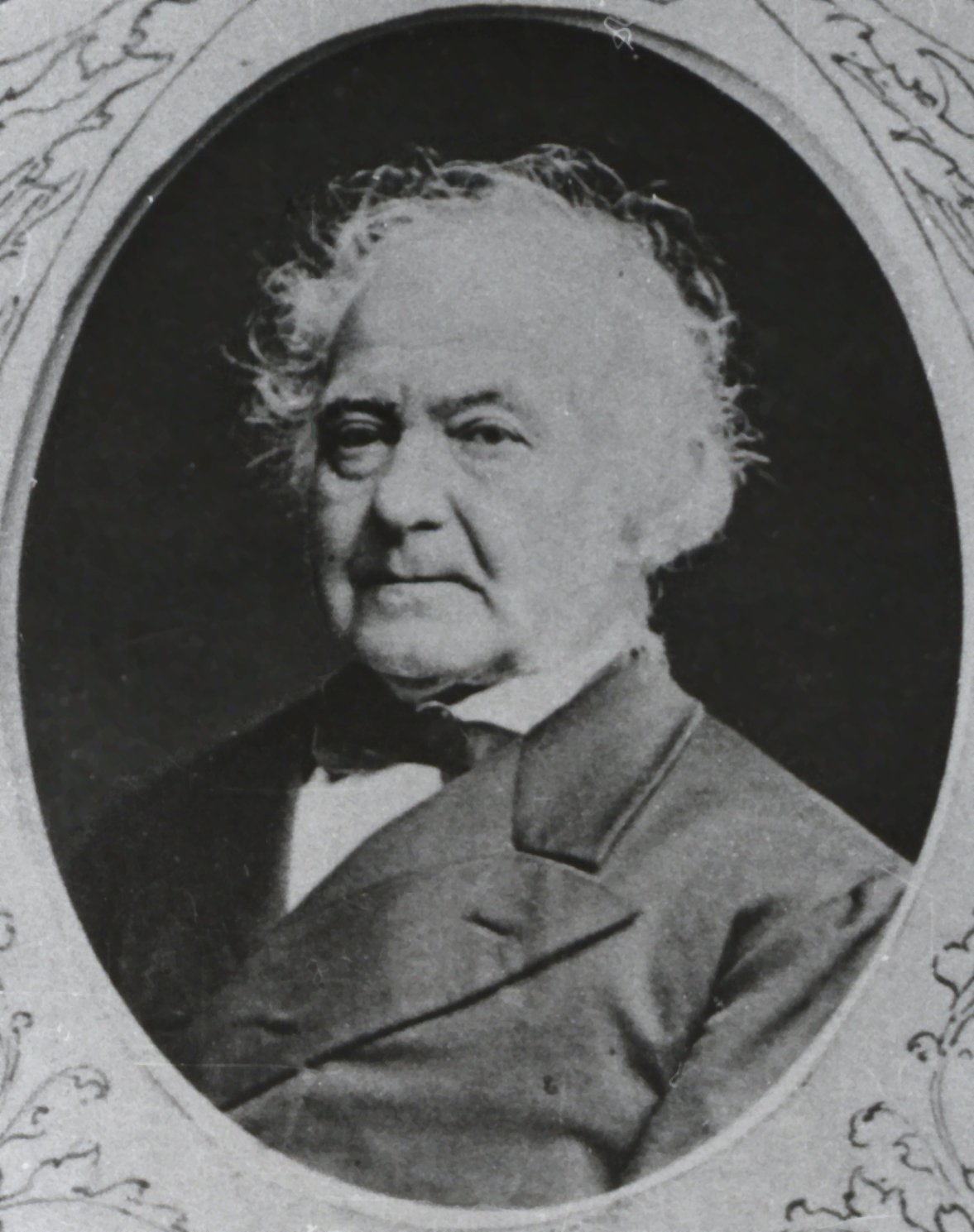
Heinrich Leberecht Fleischer.

Heinrich Leberecht Fleischer (21 February 1801 – 10 February 1888) was a German Orientalist.

== Biography ==
He was born at Schandau, Saxony. From 1819 to 1824, he studied theology and Oriental languages at Leipzig, subsequently continuing his studies in Paris, where he continued his studies of the Arabic, Turkish and Persian languages under de Sacy. From 1831 to 1835, he taught at one of the Dresden high schools. In 1836, he was appointed professor of oriental languages at Leipzig University, and retained this post till his death, in spite of invitations to accept similar positions in Saint Petersburg and Berlin.

Fleischer was one of the eight foreign members of the French Academy of Inscriptions and a knight of the German Ordre Pour le Mérite (1868). He was a member of many German and foreign scientific societies, possessor of honorary degrees from the universities of Königsberg, Prague, Saint Petersburg, Dorpat and Edinburgh, and one of the founders of the Deutsche Morgenländische Gesellschaft.

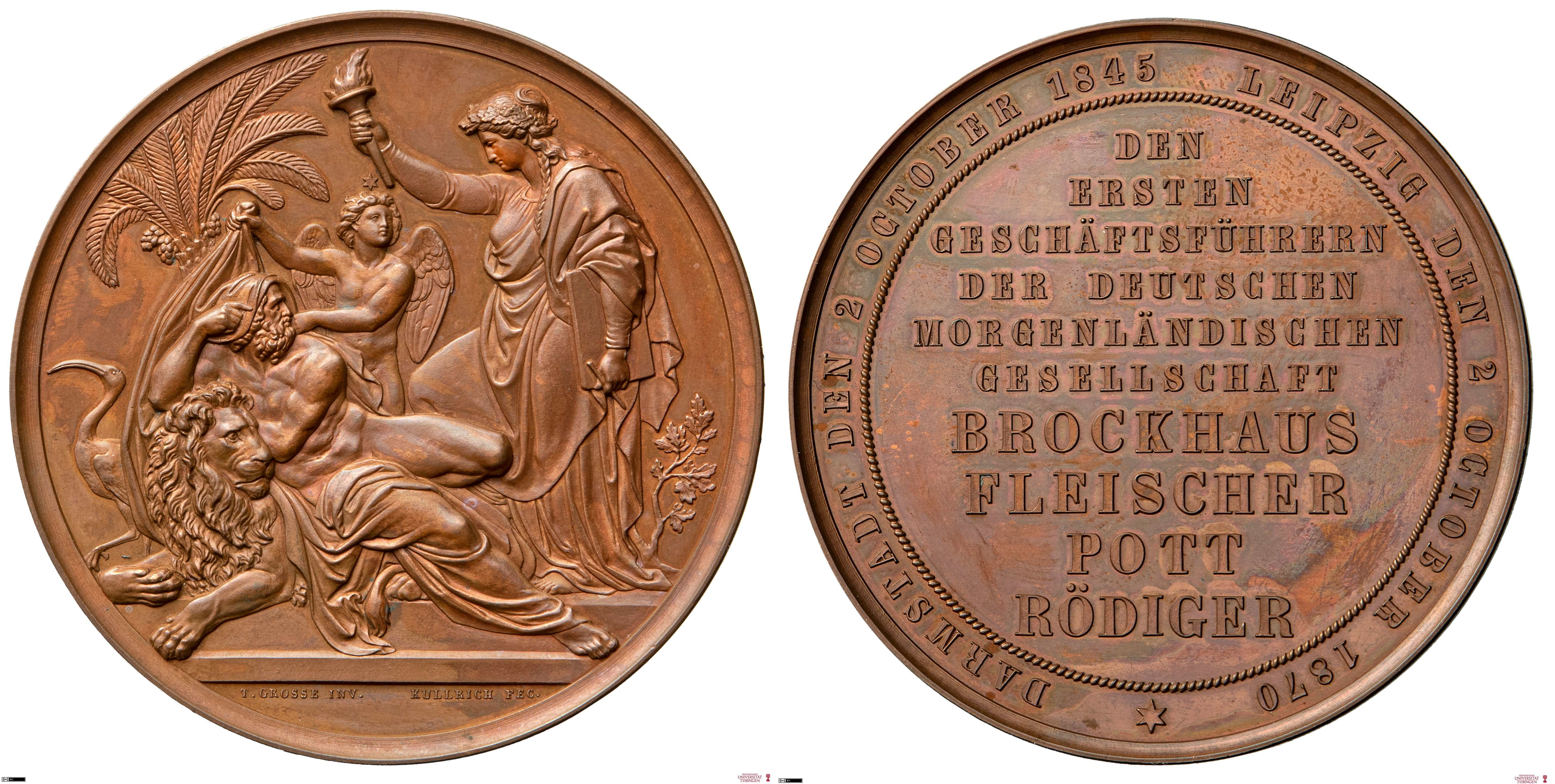
Medal Brockhaus, Fleischer, Pott, Roediger 1870

In 1870 he received a combined medal (together with Brockhaus, Pott and Rödiger) in occasion of the 25th anniversary of the DMG.

He died at Leipzig.

== Writings ==
His most important works were editions of Abu'l-Fida's Historia ante-Islamica (1831—1834), Al-Zamakhshari's Golden Necklaces (Leipzig, 1835), and of Al-Baydawi's Commentary on the Koran (1846–1848). He compiled a catalogue of the Oriental manuscripts in the royal library at Dresden (1831); published an edition and German translation of Ali's Hundred Sayings (1837); the continuation of Christian Maxmilian Habicht's edition of The Thousand and One Nights (vols. ix-xii, 1842–1843); and an edition of Mirza Muhammed Ibrahim's Persian Grammar (1847). He also wrote Hermes Trismegistus an die Menschliche Seele (Leipzig, 1870), Kleinere Schriften (3 vols., Leipzig, 1885–88), and an account of the Arabic, Turkish and Persian manuscripts at the town library in Leipzig.

From 1853 onwards, with significant support from Fleischer, the total of 487 volumes of the Refaiya, a centuries-old manuscript collection of a Syrian family from Damascus containing texts on the humanities and natural sciences, were purchased for the Leipzig University Library, thus placing the library among the European libraries with a significant number of important oriental manuscripts.

== Fleischer on the Nature of Arabic Language ==
"Die Frage ist für uns nicht: was ist das reinste, correcteste und schönste, sondern was ist überhaupt Arabisch?" (in: Kleinere Schriften, Leipzig, 1888, Vol. iii, p. 156).

i.e. "The question for us is not: What is the purest, the most beautiful and correct Arabic, but what is Arabic in general?"
