= Cornelsen Verlag =

German publishing house

Cornelsen Verlag GmbH
- Status: Active
- Founded: 1946
- Founder: Franz Cornelsen
- Country of origin: Germany
- Headquarters location: Berlin
- Distribution: Germany, Austria, Switzerland
- Key people: Executive board: Sarah Gewert; Christine Hauck; Christian Fuhrhop; Mark van Mierle (Chair); Georg Müller-Loeffelholz
- Publication types: Books
- Nonfiction topics: School and educational books
- Official website: www.cornelsen.de

Cornelsen Verlag (German pronunciation: [kɔʁˈneːlzn̩]) is a German textbook publisher that offers educational media in Germany, Austria and Switzerland.

Initially focused on the English language, the publishing house, founded in Berlin in 1946, specialized in the development of textbooks for use in primary and secondary schools. It now offers learning and teaching materials in a variety of media. Since the dissolution of the Bibliographisches Institut GmbH in 2022, it has also been the publisher of the Duden.

It is a company of the Cornelsen Group and trades under the name Cornelsen Verlag GmbH.

== History ==
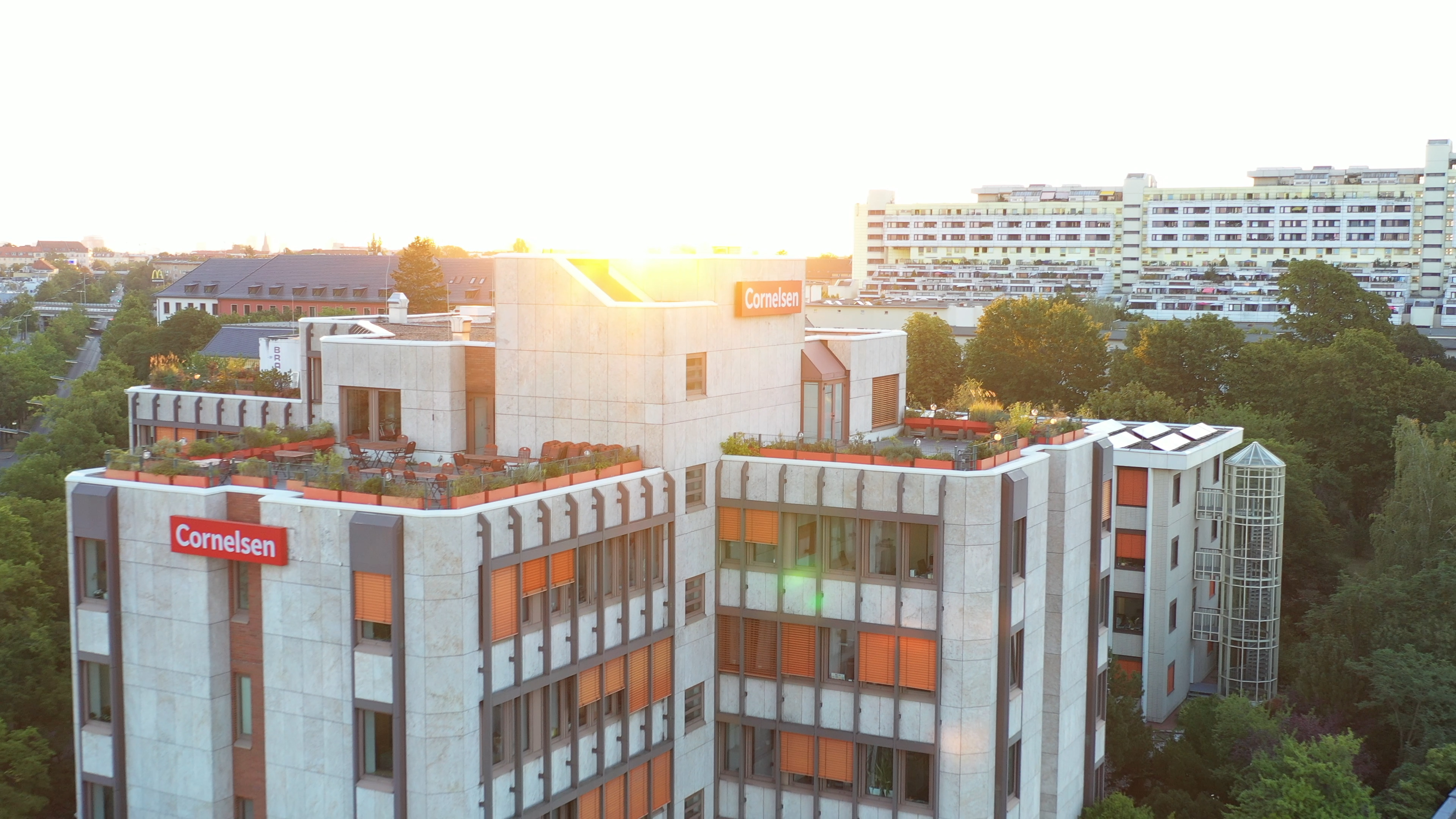
Publishing building in Berlin

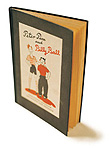
Peter Pim & Billy Ball – a textbook for English language classes published in 1948

The Cornelsen Verlag was founded in Berlin in 1946 by Franz Cornelsen and his wife Hildegard, the author of the English textbook Peter Pim and Billy Ball. Since the 1970s, it has secured its market position primarily by taking over competitors (Hirschgraben, W. Girardet, Schwann-Bagel, Kamp and most recently Oldenbourg). After the German reunification, in the spring of 1991, Cornelsen also took over the East German publisher Volk und Wissen Verlag, which was founded in Berlin and Leipzig in 1945 and in which almost all textbooks used in the former German Democratic Republic were published. In 2011, Cornelsen Verlag was merged with other leading textbook publishers to form Cornelsen Schulverlage GmbH. The publishing program includes 23,000 titles.

The company belongs to Franz Cornelsen Bildungsholding GmbH & Co. KG.

== Digital media ==
At the 2014 trade show didacta, Cornelsen presented the online platform scook. On the website, teachers were able to plan lessons and to access all teaching materials using the online edition of a textbook. Already in February 2011, LernCoachies.de, an online learning portal, had been opened that is based on the company's textbooks for grades 4 to 7.

In addition to books, Cornelsen published children's games and educational software as well as a series of games under the name "Genius".

In 2015 Cornelsen Verlag founded the corporate startup Duden Learnattack, an online learning portal for students from 5th grade to the Abitur, the exam at the end of German secondary school education. It offers learning videos, interactive exercises and sample class work as well as WhatsApp tutoring in nine subjects.

In June 2017, Cornelsen took over the project mBook which had been developed by the German Institut für digitales Lernen (Institute for Digital Learning), thereby expanding its range of digital and multimedia learning materials. mBook has been replaced meanwhile by other offers of the company in digital format.

Cornelsen has made subsequent investments in digital education solutions by further acquisitions, e.g. in the field of individual company solutions for e-learning, mobile learning, blended learning, workplace learning and performance support.

== Corporate structure ==
The Franz Cornelsen Foundation is the majority shareholder of the publishing group. The group is managed by a holding company. The products of the group companies are distributed by the Cornelsen Verlagskontor (CVK) in Bielefeld.
