= Meyers Konversations-Lexikon =

German encyclopedia (1839 to 1984)

- Meyers Lexikon
- Language: German
- Subject: General
- Genre: Encyclopedia
- Publisher: Bibliographisches Institut
- Publication date: 1839–1984
- Publication place: Germany
- ISBN: 9781146317030
- OCLC: 848096109

Meyers Konversations-Lexikon or Meyers Lexikon was a major encyclopedia in the German language that existed in various editions, and by several titles, from 1839 to 1984, when it merged with the Brockhaus Enzyklopädie.

Joseph Meyer (1796–1856), who had founded the publishing house Bibliographisches Institut in 1826, intended to issue a universal encyclopaedia meant for a broad public: people having a general knowledge as well as businessmen, technicians and scholars, considering contemporary works like those of Pierer and Brockhaus to be superficial or obsolete.

== First edition ==
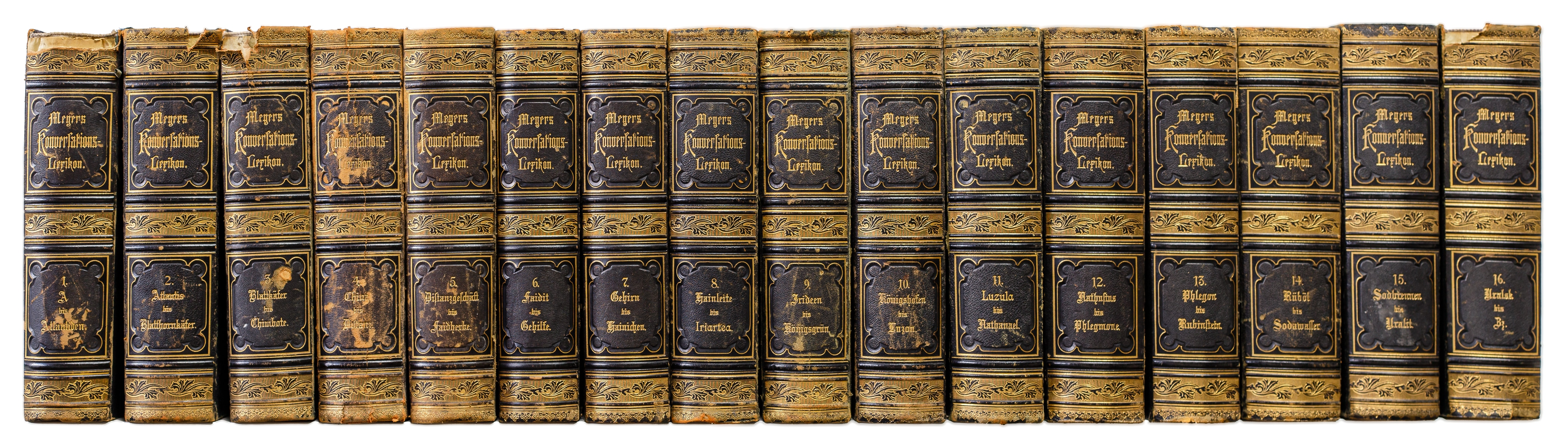
Volumes of the 4th edition (1885–1890)

The first part of Das Grosse Conversations-Lexikon für die gebildeten Stände ("Great encyclopaedia for the educated classes") appeared in October 1839. In contrast to its contemporaries, it contained maps and illustrations with the text.

There is no indication of the planned number of volumes or a time limit for this project, but little headway had been made by the otherwise dynamic Meyer. After six years, 14 volumes had appeared, covering only one fifth of the alphabet. Another six years passed before the last (46th) volume was published. Six supplementary volumes finally finished the work in 1855. Ultimately numbering 52 volumes, Das Grosse Conversations-Lexikon für die gebildeten Stände was the most comprehensive completed German encyclopedia of the 19th century, also called "der Wunder-Meyer" (The marvellous Meyer). The complete set was reprinted 1858–59.

== Later editions ==
The son of Joseph Meyer, Hermann Julius (1826–1909), published the next edition (which is officially the first), entitled Neues Conversations-Lexikon für alle Stände, 1857–60, that would only count 15 volumes. To avoid a long-time project, subscribers were promised it would be completed within three years, and all volumes appearing later would be given free. Of course, it was finished right on time.

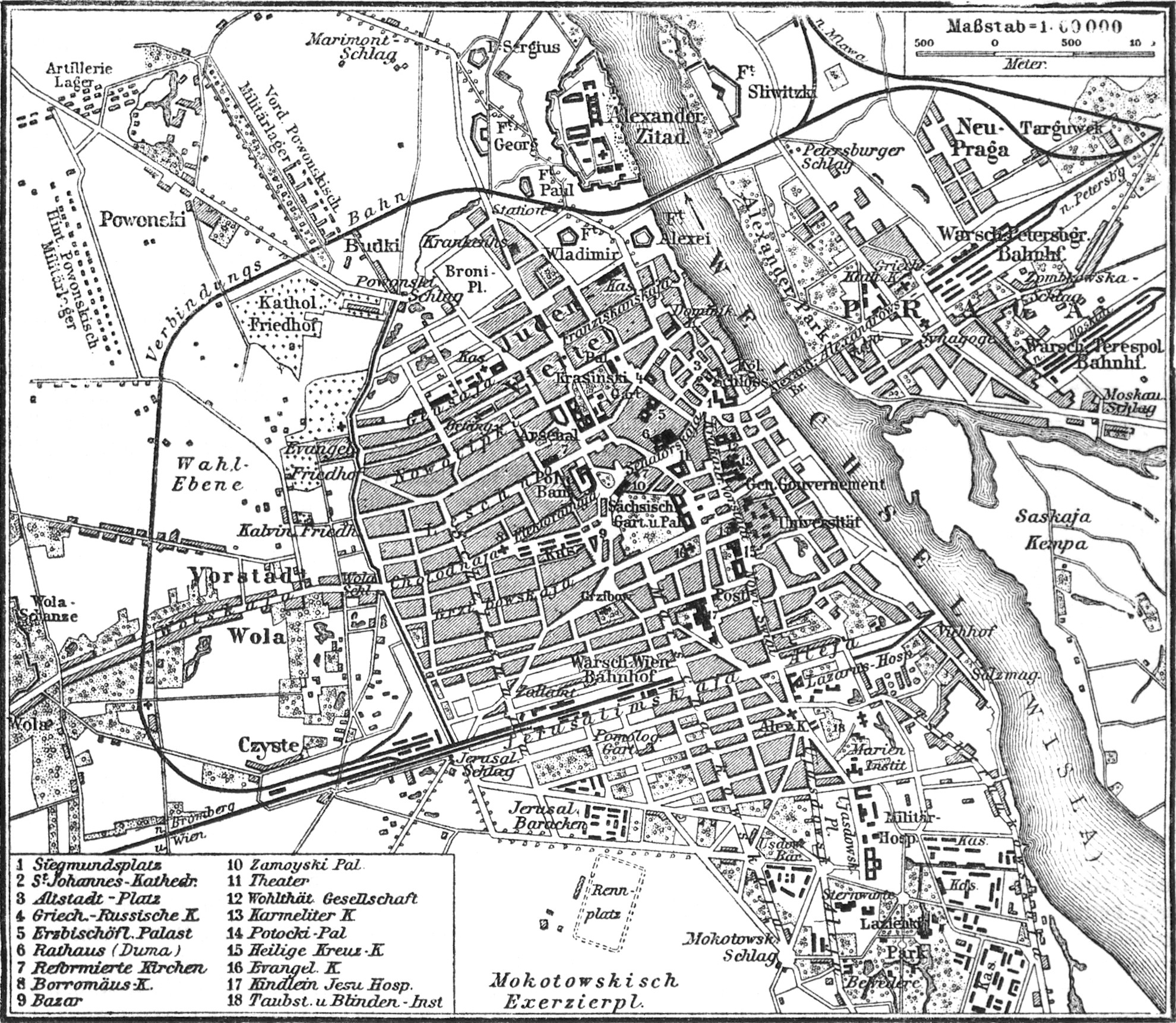
Map of Warsaw, from the 4th edition (1890)

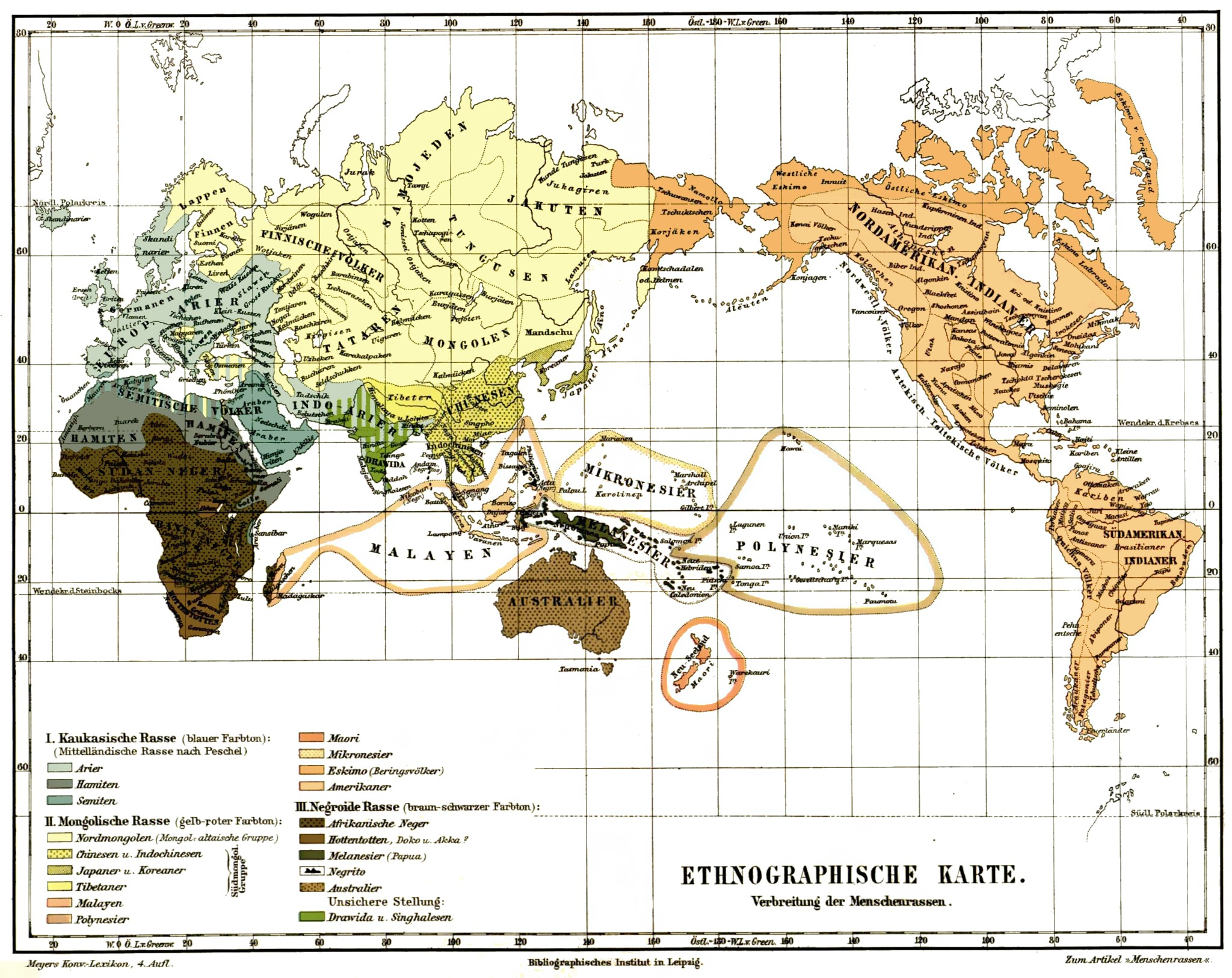
Ethnographic map of the world, from the 4th edition

The 2nd edition, Neues Konversations-Lexikon, ein Wörterbuch des allgemeinen Wissens, appeared 1861–67; the 3rd edition, now from Leipzig, was issued as Meyers Konversations-Lexikon. Eine Encyklopädie des allgemeinen Wissens 1874–78; both had 15 volumes.

The 4th edition, consisting of 16 volumes, appeared in 1885–90, with 2 supplements of update pages, volume 17 (1891) and volume 18 (1892). The 5th edition had 17 volumes, Meyers Konversations-Lexikon. Ein Nachschlagewerk des allgemeinen Wissens, 1893 to 1897. This edition sold no less than 233,000 sets.

The 6th edition, entitled Meyers Großes Konversations-Lexikon, was published 1902–08. It had 20 volumes, and the largest sale of all Meyer editions, with 240,000 sets. The First World War prevented an even bigger success. There was also the small 1908 edition, Meyers Kleines Konversations-Lexikon.

The 6th edition of the encyclopedia, and all previous editions, are in the public domain in Germany, the United States, and all countries where the copyright term of anonymous or pseudonymous works is 100 years or fewer since publication.

=== World Wars and destruction ===
The 7th and 8th editions were both briefly named Meyers Lexikon. The 7th edition counted only 12 volumes, due to the economic depression of the 1920s. It appeared in 1924–30. It came with a condensed single-volume version known as the Blitz-Lexikon.

The 8th edition (1936–42) remained incomplete due to wartime circumstances: out of 12 planned volumes only volumes number 1 through 9 plus the atlas volume number 12 could be issued. Due to its brown binding in addition to the fact that it was filtered through the Nazi censorship it has come to be known as Der Braune Meyer ("The Brown Meyer"), as brown became the colour associated with the Nazis.

The buildings of the company were completely destroyed by the bombing raids on Leipzig in 1943–44 and the company itself expropriated in 1946 without compensation. In 1953 the place of business was moved to Mannheim in West Germany (Bibliographisches Institut AG); a "VEB Bibliographisches Institut" remained in Leipzig.

=== 9th edition and Neues Lexikon ===
The 9th edition, now from Mannheim, entitled Meyers Enzyklopädisches Lexikon in 25 Bänden (in 25 volumes), appeared in 1971–79. Just like the first, this final Mannheim edition was the most comprehensive German encyclopaedia of the century.

From Leipzig (then in East Germany) came Meyers Neues Lexikon (1961–64, 8 volumes; 2nd edition 1971–78, 18 volumes), embedded in the Marxist ideology.

== Merger with Brockhaus ==
In 1984, the Bibliographisches Institut Mannheim amalgamated with its biggest competitor in field of reference books F.A. Brockhaus of Wiesbaden, in a so-called "Elefantenhochzeit" (wedding of elephants). Being aware that the new firm's program did not provide room for two similar works of this magnitude, it was decided that the big serial reference works coming from Mannheim would henceforth be marketed under the name of Brockhaus.

== See also ==
- List of encyclopedias by branch of knowledge
