= Theodor Grosse =

German painter

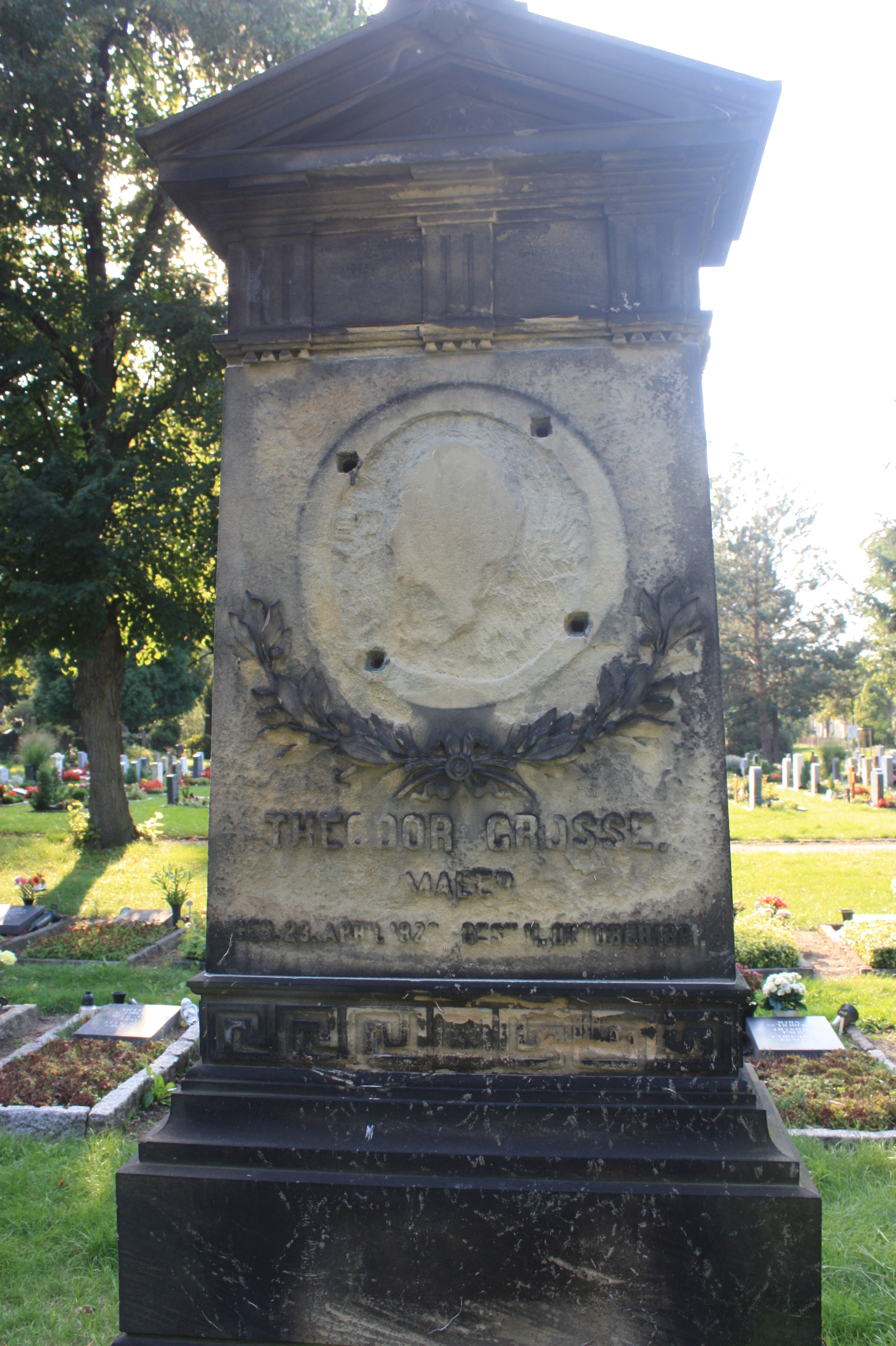
The grave of Theodor Grosse, Dresden

Theodor Grosse (1829–1891) was a German historical painter. He was born at Dresden and studied at the Dresden Academy under Bendemann. For his encaustic decorations in the castle of Count Solms Wildenfels on the Mulde, he was awarded the traveling scholarship of the Dresden Academy. After several years in Italy Grosse returned to fresco the eastern loggia of the Leipzig Museum. In 1867 he was made professor at the Dresden Academy. His other works include:

- "Leda with the Swan" (1852, Dresden Academy)
- "Scenes from the Myth of Bacchus" (1877, foyer of the New Theatre, Dresden)
- "The Visit of the Three Angels to Abraham" (1863, Museum, Leipzig)
- "Arrival of the Souls in Purgatory" (1879, after Dante, Dresden Gallery)

== See also ==
- List of German painters
