= Bibliographisches Institut =

German publishing company (1826–2022)

- Title page of Meyers Konversations-Lexikon, 4th ed., 1889
- Parent company: Bibliographisches Institut & F. A. Brockhaus AG
- Founded: 1826
- Founder: Joseph Meyer
- Defunct: 2022
- Successor: Cornelsen Verlag
- Country of origin: Germany
- Headquarters location: Leipzig
- Publication types: Meyers Lexikon, Brehms Tierleben, Duden

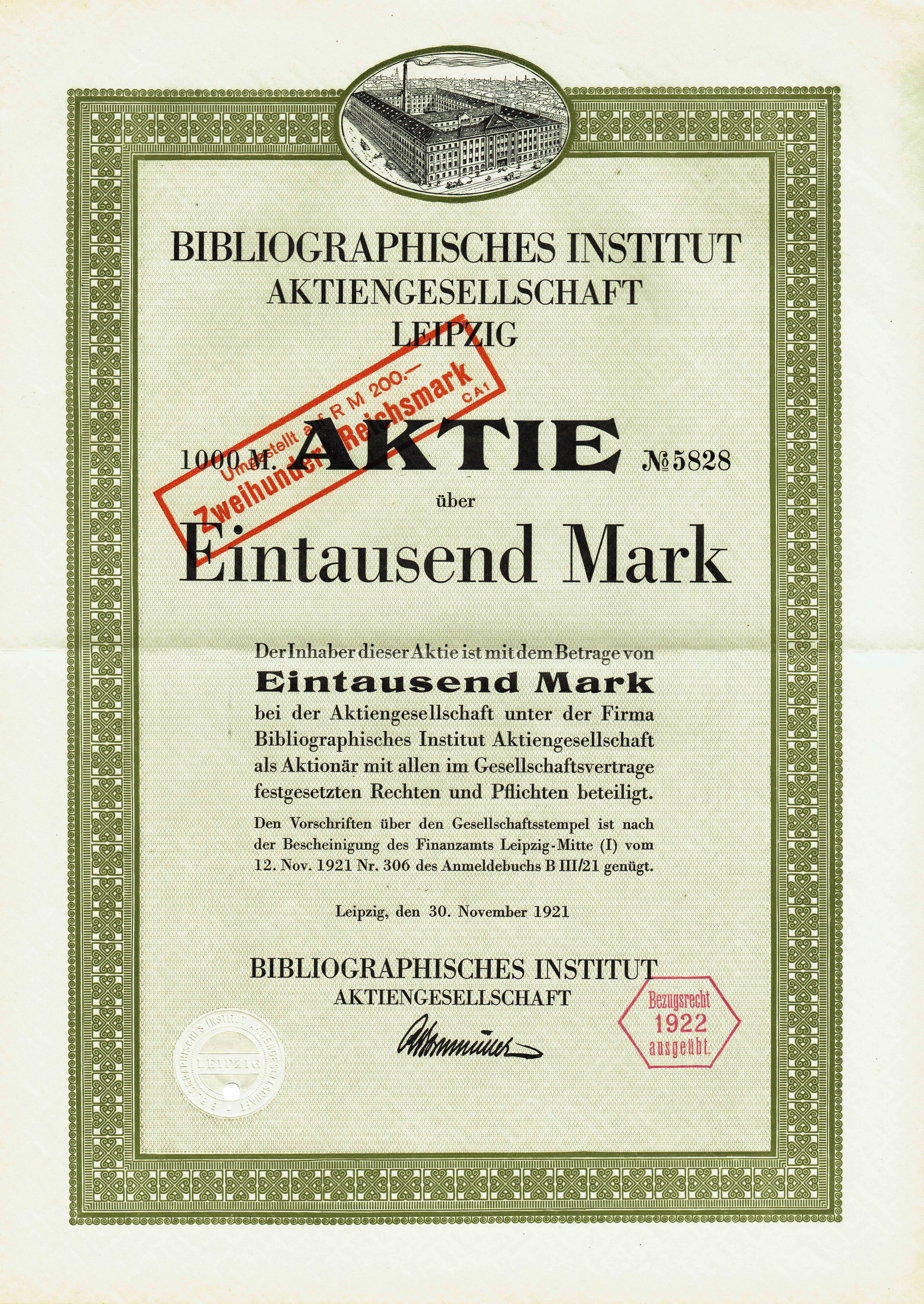
Share of the Bibliographisches Institut AG, issued 30 November 1921

The Bibliographisches Institut was a German publishing company founded 1826 in Gotha by Joseph Meyer. It moved to Hildburghausen in 1828 and to Leipzig in 1874. Its production over the years includes such well-known titles as Meyers Lexikon (encyclopaedias, since 1839, see Meyers Konversations-Lexikon), Brehms Tierleben (animal life, 1863–1869, 4th ed. 1911–1918); Duden (dictionaries on every aspect of the language, since 1880); Meyers Reisebücher (guide books, 1862–1936); Meyers Klassiker (literature); atlases (Meyers Handatlas, Der Grosse Weltatlas); newspapers (Koloniale Zeitschrift); and others.

In 2022, the Bibliographisches Institut was fully integrated into Cornelsen Verlag and thus ceased to exist.

The buildings of the company were completely destroyed by the bombing raids on Leipzig 1943/1944; the company itself was expropriated by the communist regime of East Germany in 1946 and turned into a publicly owned enterprise (volkseigener Betrieb). The shareholders moved the company to Mannheim in West Germany in 1953 (Bibliographisches Institut AG). Titles like Meyers (Enzyklopädisches) Lexikon, Der Große Duden, Schlag Nach! and Meyers Großer Weltatlas appeared again. In Leipzig remained the VEB Bibliographisches Institut, operating in the same field, publishing Meyers Neues Lexikon, Duden etc.

In 1984 Bibliographisches Institut AG amalgamated with its biggest competitor in the market of reference works, F. A. Brockhaus of Wiesbaden to Bibliographisches Institut & F. A. Brockhaus AG, having their seat in Mannheim. After the German reunification the company regained its former properties in Leipzig in 1991.

== See also ==
- Verlag Enzyklopädie
- Bibliographisches Institut & F. A. Brockhaus
