= Friedrich Arnold Brockhaus =

German encyclopedia publisher and editor (1772–1823)

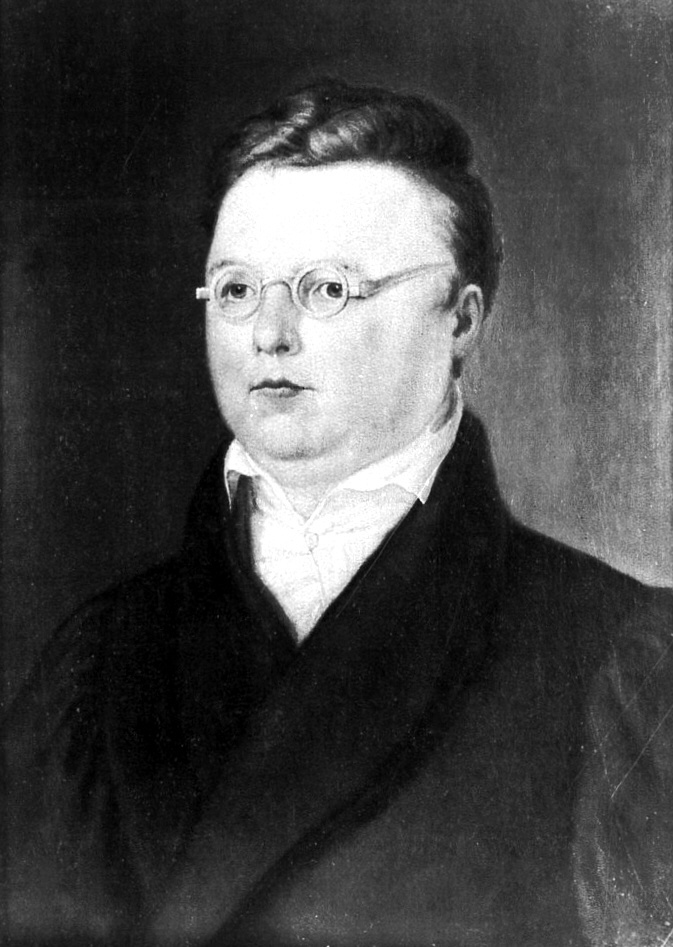
Friedrich Arnold Brockhaus

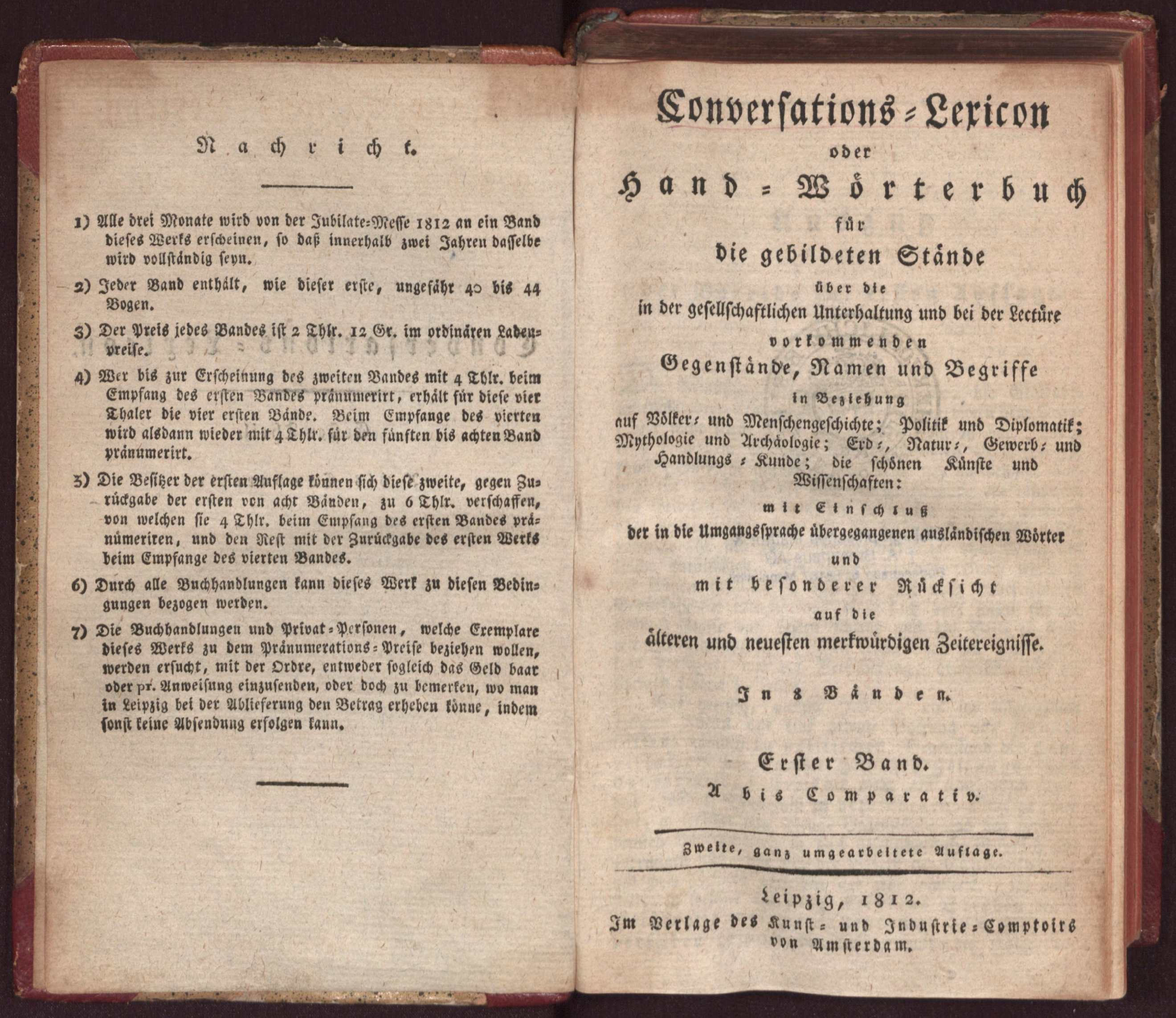
Title page of the Brockhaus Encyclopedia 2nd edition (1812)

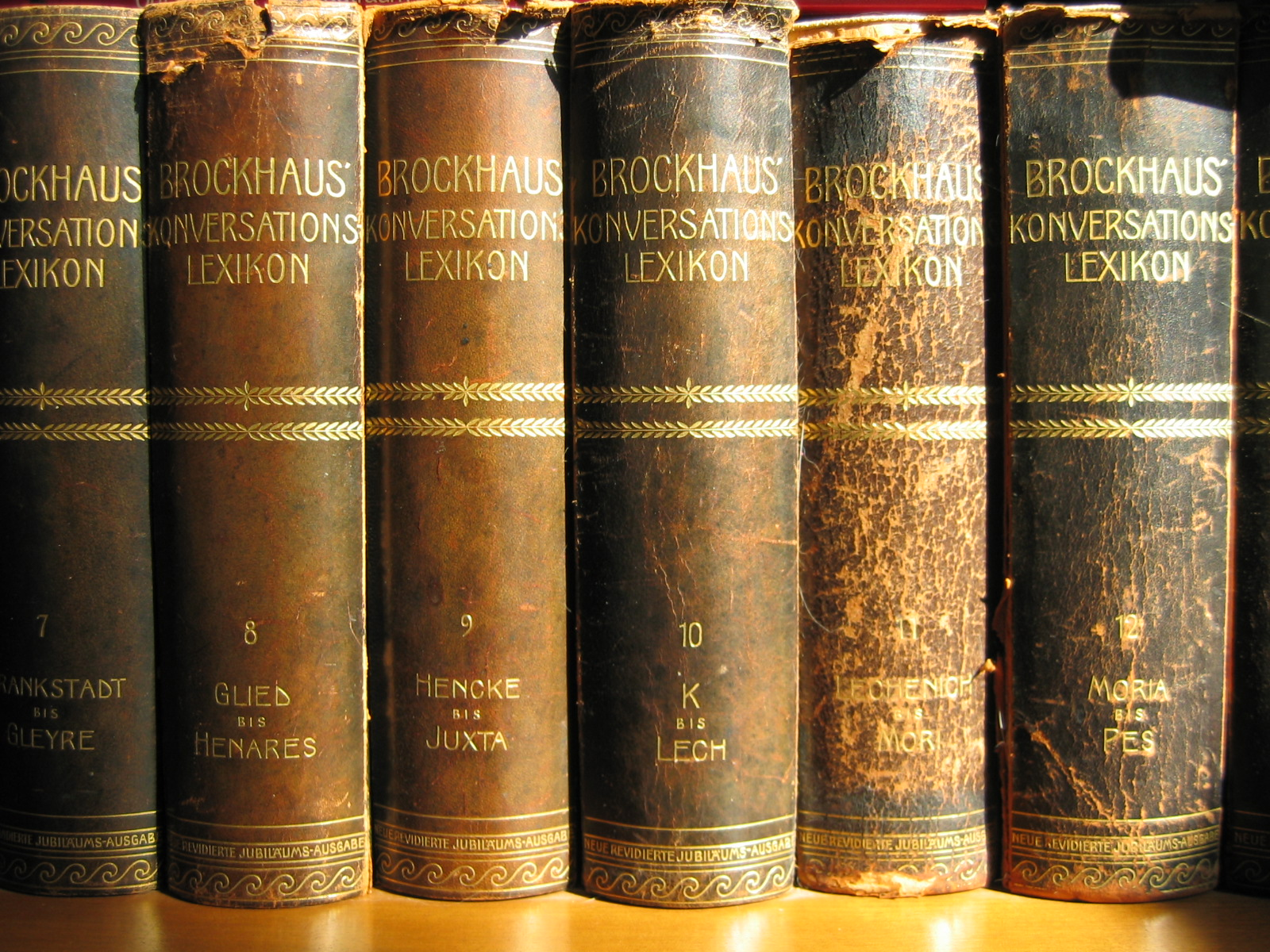
Brockhaus' Konversations-Lexikon, 14th edition, c. 1910

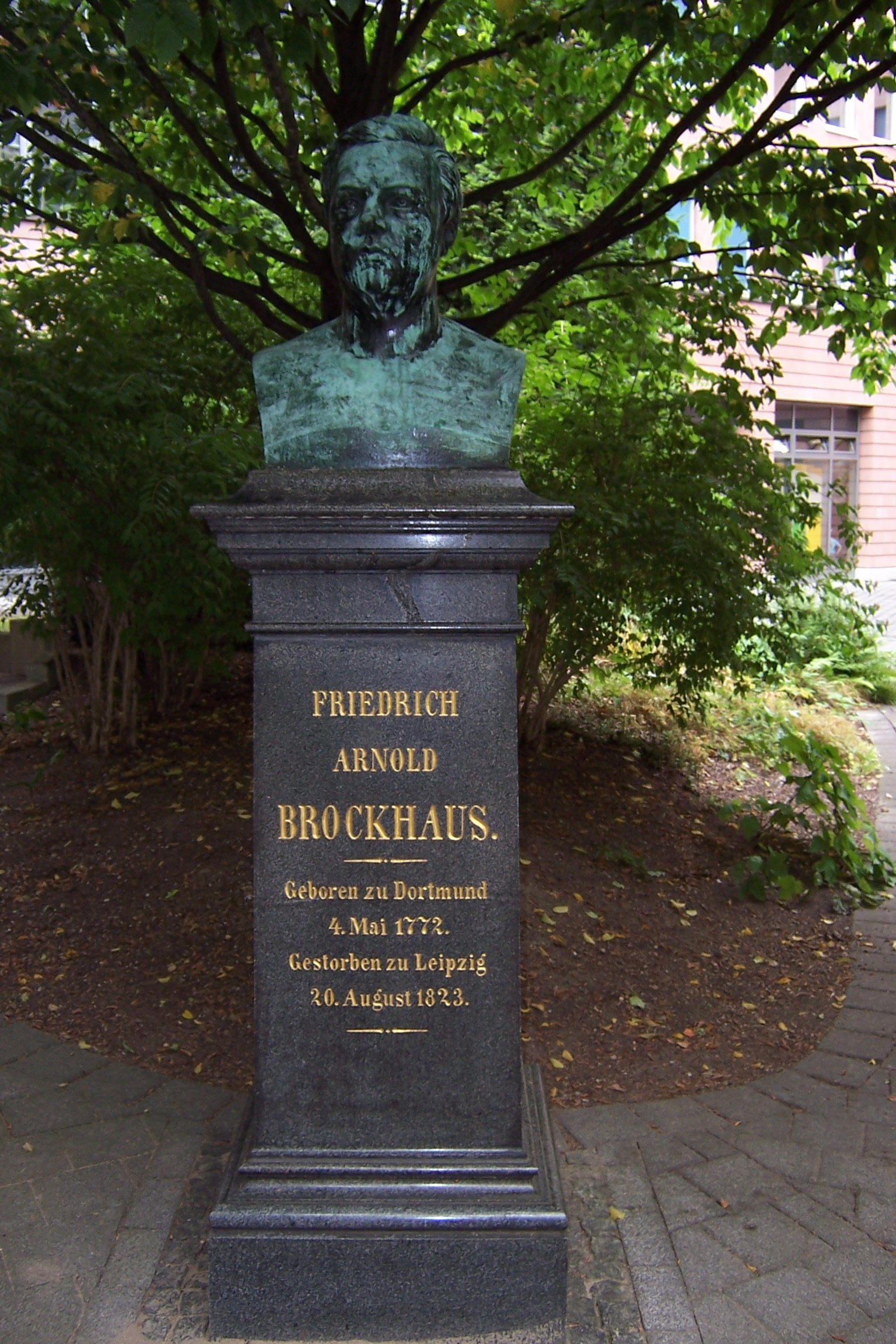
Monument to Brockhaus with bust at the inner courtyard of the Brockhaus-Zentrum in Leipzig

Friedrich Arnold Brockhaus (4 May 1772 – 20 August 1823) was a German encyclopedia publisher and editor, famed for publishing the Conversations-Lexikon, which is now published as the Brockhaus encyclopedia.

== Biography ==
Brockhaus was educated at the gymnasium of his native Dortmund, and from 1788 to 1793 served an apprenticeship in a mercantile house at Düsseldorf. He then devoted two years at the University of Leipzig to the study of modern languages and literature, after which he set up in Dortmund an emporium for English goods. In 1801, he transferred this business to Arnheim, and in the following year to Amsterdam.

In 1805, having given up his first line of trade, Brockhaus began business as a publisher. Two journals projected by him were not allowed by the government to survive for any length of time, and in 1810 the complications in the affairs of Holland induced him to return homewards. In 1811 he settled at Altenburg. About three years previously he had purchased the copyright of the bankrupt Conversations-Lexikon, an encyclopedia started in 1796, and in 1810-1811 he completed the first edition of this celebrated work. It was widely imitated as a model for encyclopedias, and is still published today, known as the Brockhaus Encyclopedia.

A second edition under Brockhaus's editorship was begun in 1812, and was received with universal favour. His business extended rapidly, and in 1818 Brockhaus moved to Leipzig, where he established a large printing-house. Among the more extensive of his many literary undertakings were the critical periodicals — Hermes, the Literarisches Konversationsblatt (afterwards the Blätter für literarische Unterhaltung) and the Zeitgenossen, and some large historical and bibliographical works, such as Friedrich Ludwig Georg von Raumer's Geschichte der Hohenstaufen, and Friedrich Adolf Ebert's Allgemeines bibliographisches Lexikon.

Brockhaus died in Leipzig. The business was carried on by his sons, Friedrich Brockhaus (1800–1865), who retired in 1850, and Heinrich Brockhaus (1804–1874), under whom it was considerably extended. Heinrich especially rendered great services to literature and science, which the University of Jena recognized by making him, in 1858, honorary Doctor of Philosophy. In the years 1842–1848, Heinrich Brockhaus was member of the Saxon second chamber, as representative for Leipzig, was made honorary citizen of that city in 1872, and died there on 15 November 1874.

His firm continues under the name F. A. Brockhaus AG in his honor. He is also the eponym of 27765 Brockhaus, a main-belt asteroid discovered in 1991.

== See also ==
- F.A. Brockhaus AG
- Isis (journal, 1816)
