= Conversations-Lexikon mit vorzüglicher Rücksicht auf die gegenwärtigen Zeiten =

German-language encyclopedia

The Conversations-Lexikon mit vorzüglicher Rücksicht auf die gegenwärtigen Zeiten (English: Encyclopaedia with Special Regard to the Present Times) was a German-language encyclopedia published in Leipzig, Germany between 1796 and 1808.

The encyclopedia was published in 8 volumes and 2,762 pages. It was edited by Dr. Renatus Gotthelf Löbel, who intended to supersede Johann Hübner by including geography, history, biography, mythology, philosophy, natural history, and other topics. Volumes I-IV (A to R) appeared between 1796 and 1800, with vol. V appearing in 1806. This work was acquired and completed by Friedrich Arnold Brockhaus in 1808 and formed the basis of the many editions of the Brockhaus Encyclopedia, which continued publication until 1 February 2014.
