= White horse (disambiguation) =

A white horse is a horse born white that stays white throughout its life.

White Horse, or variants, may also refer to:

== Colouring of horses ==
- Dominant white, a group of genetically-related horse coat color conditions
- Gray horse, a horse with a coat color characterized by progressive depigmentation of coat hairs
- Sabino horse, a horse with a group of white spotting patterns
- Pinto horse, a horse with a coat color that consists of large patches of white and any other color
- When a white horse is not a horse, a paradox in Chinese philosophy attributed to Gongsun Long

== Mythology and symbolism ==
- White horses in mythology
- White Horse of Hanover, an emblem of the Royal House of Hanover
- White Horse of Kent, a symbol of the English county of Kent

== People ==
- White Horse (Kiowa leader) (died 1892), chief of the Kiowa nation
- Logan Fontenelle (1825–1855), also known as Shon-ga-ska (White Horse), an interpreter in Omaha negotiations with the United States

== Settlements ==
=== United States ===
- White Horse, California
- White Horse, New Jersey
- White Horse, Bucks County, Pennsylvania
- White Horse, Lancaster County, Pennsylvania
- White Horse, South Dakota, in Todd County
- White Horse Historic District, or White Horse Village, in Willistown Township, Chester County, Pennsylvania

=== Other countries ===
- White Horse Bluff, a volcano in British Columbia, Canada
- White Horse Bridge, in Wembley, England
- White Horse Stone, two megaliths near Aylesford, Kent, England
- White Horse Temple, the first Buddhist temple in China
- Vale of White Horse, a local government district in Oxfordshire, England

== Hill figures ==
=== England ===
- Alton Barnes White Horse, in Wiltshire
- Broad Town White Horse, in Wiltshire
- Cherhill White Horse, in Wiltshire
- Devizes White Horse, in Wiltshire
- Folkestone White Horse, in Kent
- Hackpen White Horse, in Wiltshire
- Kilburn White Horse, in North Yorkshire
- Litlington White Horse, in East Sussex
- Marlborough White Horse, in Wiltshire
- Osmington White Horse, in Dorset
- Pewsey White Horse, in Wiltshire
- Tan Hill White Horse, in Wiltshire
- Uffington White Horse, in Oxfordshire
- Westbury White Horse, or Bratton White Horse, in Wiltshire
- Woolbury White Horse, in Hampshire

=== New Zealand ===
- White Horse Monument, in Waimate, New Zealand

== Military ==
- Battle of White Horse Hill, a fierce battle in the Korean War

== Pubs, inns and taverns ==
- Whitehorse Hotel, Whitehorse, Yukon, Canada

=== Australia ===
- White Horse Inn, Berrima, in New South Wales, Australia
- White Horse Hotel, Surry Hills, New South Wales
- White Horse Hotel, Toowoomba, Queensland
- White Horse Hotel, which gave its name to Whitehorse Road, which became Maroondah Highway, in Melbourne, Victoria

=== England ===
- Great White Horse Hotel, Suffolk
- Old White Horse Inn, Bingley, West Yorkshire
- White Horse Hotel, Romsey, Hampshire
- White Horse Inn, Beverley, East Riding of Yorkshire
- White Horse Tavern, Cambridge, Cambridgeshire, an alleged meeting place for English Protestant reformers
- White Horse, Swinton, Greater Manchester
- The White Horse, Burnham Green, Hertfordshire
- The White Horse, Enfield, London
- The White Horse, Hertford, Hertfordshire
- The White Horse, Potters Bar, Hertfordshire

=== United States ===
- White Horse Inn (Oakland, California)
- White Horse Tavern (Boston, Massachusetts)
- White Horse Tavern (New York City), known for its association with poet Dylan Thomas
- White Horse Tavern (Coatesville, Pennsylvania)
- White Horse Tavern (Douglassville, Pennsylvania)
- White Horse Tavern (East Whiteland Township, Pennsylvania)
- White Horse Tavern (Newport, Rhode Island), constructed before 1673, believed to be the oldest tavern building in the U.S.

== Arts and entertainment ==
- The White Horse Inn, a radio show hosted by Michael Horton

=== Film and television ===
- White Horse (film), a 2008 short documentary
- The White Horse (film), a 1962 Mexican film
- The White Horse (series), a 1993 Russian TV series
- The White Horses, a 1965 Yugoslavian/German TV series

=== Literature ===
- The White Horse a 1758 book by Emanuel Swedenborg
- The Ballad of the White Horse, a 1911 poem by G. K. Chesterton
- When a white horse is not a horse, a paradox in Chinese philosophy in the White Horse Dialogue
- The White Horse Inn (play), a 1897 play by Oscar Blumenthal and Gustav Kadelburg
- The White Horse Inn (operetta), a 1930 operetta by Ralph Benatzky and Robert Stolz

==== Works based on the play by Blumenthal and Kadelburg ====
- At the White Horse Inn, an 1899 English language version by Sydney Rosenfeld which was staged on Broadway
- The White Horse Inn (1926 film), a German silent comedy film

===== Productions based on the operetta by Benatzky and Stolz =====
- The White Horse Inn (Broadway version), from 1936
- The White Horse Inn (1935 film), a German musical film
- White Horse Inn (1948 film), an Argentinian film
- The White Horse Inn (1952 film), a West German musical film
- The White Horse Inn (1960 film), an Austrian-West German musical film

=== Music ===
- "Ride a White Horse" (Goldfrapp song), 2006
- White Horse (album), by Michael Omartian, 1974
- "White Horse" (Laid Back song), 1983
- "White Horse" (Taylor Swift song), 2008
- "White Horse" (Jessica 6 song), 2011
- "White Horse" (Chris Stapleton song), 2023
- "White Horse", a 1996 song by Kilo Ali
- "White Horse", a 2010 song by Sarah McLeod
- "White Horse", a 2019 song by Tenille Townes from The Lemonade Stand
- "White Horse", a 2022 song by Skillet from Dominion
- "White Horses", a 2025 song by Wolf Alice from The Clearing
- "White Horses", by Jacky, the theme tune of 1965 TV series The White Horses

=== Other uses in arts and entertainment ===
- White Horse at Ebbsfleet, a proposed gigantic sculpture in Kent, England
- The White Horse (Constable), an 1819 oil painting

== Transportation ==
- White Horse, a GWR 3031 Class locomotive built 1891
- White Horse Ferries, a defunct ferry company in England
- U.S. Route 30 in New Jersey, known as the White Horse Pike

== Other uses ==
- White Horse (military), the South Korean army's 9th Infantry Division
- White Horse (whisky), a blended Scotch whisky
- White Horse Distillery, an Irish whiskey distillery
- White Horse Prophecy, of the Latter Day Saints
- White horses, a white and foamy sea wave; see Beaufort scale

== See also ==
- Whitehorse (disambiguation)
- White Horse Mountain (disambiguation)
- White knight (disambiguation)
- Battle of White Horse, during the Korean War
- Hill figure
- 1923 FA Cup Final, known as the White Horse Final, a football match
- Cheval Blanc (disambiguation), French for "White horse"
