= Manasse Herbst =

Actor and singer (1913-1997)

Manasse Herbst (1 November 1913 – 3 January 1997) was a German-speaking actor and singer. He participated in 416 sold-out performances of the operetta White Horse Inn between 1930 and 1932 in Berlin. During the first half of the 1930s, Herbst had a relationship with the Baron Gottfried von Cramm, who was sentenced in a Nazi propaganda trial. Due to his Jewish background and the Nazi prohibition to perform his job, Herbst fled from Germany in 1936. Later, he became a U.S. citizen.

== Life ==
In 1920, Herbst appeared in the silent movie Papa Haydn as the young son of the composer Joseph Haydn. In 1926 he acted in the silent movie The Son of Hannibal. Between 1930 and 1932, he performed 416 times in the sold-out operetta Im weissen Rössl (White Horse Inn) in the Großes Schauspielhaus of Berlin. It was described as a cultural highlight in the Weimar Republic, which antagonised the Nazis who prohibited it as degenerate art as soon as they came to power in 1933.

In 1931, 17-year-old Herbst met the married 21-year-old Gottfried von Cramm in the Berlin nightclub Eldorado when the latter was at the beginning of his career as a tennis champion. They were close friends until Herbst's forced emigration.

In April 1937, von Cramm was interrogated by Gestapo about his intimate relationship with Herbst. A rent boy had denounced him and others. For the Nazis, the denunciation of von Cramm was just a minor offshoot of the bigger Blomberg-Fritsch Affair. In an effort to reduce his sentence, von Cramm tried to shorten the duration of his liaison with Herbst to the time before the aggravation of the anti-gay laws that took place in 1935. In an exculpatory statement, he claimed to be blackmailed by Herbst to avoid a harsh sentence for a breach of exchange control regulations. von Cramm was sentenced to one year in jail but was released on probation after seven months. His mother had intervened and met Hermann Göring, who was a member of the Rot-Weiss Tennis Club where von Cramm played.

After World War II, Herbst, meanwhile married, visited Germany to thank von Cramm for saving his life. Herbst later lived in Hallandale, Florida, where he died at the age of 83.

== Silent movies ==
- 1920: Papa Haydn (Director Karl Frey) as young son of composer Joseph Haydn
- 1926: The Son of Hannibal (Director Felix Basch), starring Liane Haid, Alfons Fryland, Ferdinand von Alten, Siegfried Arno, Alexander Murski, Bruno Arno, Nikolai Malikoff

== Theater ==
- 1930–1932: The White Horse Inn (Director Erik Charell), as Piccolo, next to Paul Hörbiger, Willi Schaeffers, Siegfried Arno, Max Hansen, Walter Jankuhn, Camilla Spira, Otto Wallburg.

== Literature ==
- Marshall Jon Fisher: Ich spiele um mein Leben. Gottfried von Cramm und das beste Tennis-Match aller Zeiten. Osburg 1990, ISBN 978-3-940731-31-9.
- Andreas Pretzel: NS-Opfer unter Vorbehalt: Homosexuelle Männer in Berlin nach 1945. LIT, Münster 2002, ISBN 3-8258-6390-5.
- Marshall Jon Fisher: A Terrible Splendor – Three Extraordinary Men, a World Poised for War, and the Greatest Tennis Match Ever Played. Crown/Archetype 2009. ISBN 978-0307393951
- Clinton Elliott: The Intimate Lives of Gay Men Past and Present. Author House 2014. ISBN 9781481765091
- Elizabeth Wilson: Love Game – A History of Tennis, from Victorian Pastime to Global Phenomenon. Serpent’s Tail 2014. ISBN 978-1846689116
