= The White Horse Inn (operetta) =

1930 operetta by Ralph Benatzky

- Operetta or musical comedy by Ralph Benatzky, Robert Stolz
- Librettist: Ralph Benatzky, Hans Müller-Einigen, Erik Charell, Robert Gilbert
- Language: German
- Based on: Comedy of the same name by Oscar Blumenthal, Gustav Kadelburg
- Premiere: 8 November 1930; Großes Schauspielhaus, Berlin

The White Horse Inn (or White Horse Inn) (German title: Im weißen Rößl (Note: According to the German spelling reform of the 1990s, which curbed the use of the letter ß, Rößl, which has a diminutive suffix added to the noun Roß ("horse", "steed"), now has to be spelt Rössl (just as it is Ross now instead of Roß). Therefore, both Rößl and Rössl can be seen nowadays, depending on when a particular text was written.)) is an operetta or musical comedy by Ralph Benatzky and Robert Stolz in collaboration with a number of other composers and writers, set in the picturesque Salzkammergut region of Upper Austria. It is about the head waiter of the White Horse Inn in St. Wolfgang who is desperately in love with the owner of the inn, a resolute young woman who at first only has eyes for one of her regular guests.

Sometimes classified as an operetta, the show enjoyed huge successes in London's West End (651 performances at the Coliseum starting 8 April 1931) and as a Broadway version; it was filmed several times. Like The Sound of Music and the three Sissi movies, the operetta and its several film adaptations have contributed to the popular image of Austria as an Alpine idyll for tourists. Today, Im weißen Rößl is mainly remembered for its songs, many of which have become popular classics.

== The original play ==
In the last decade of the 19th century, Oscar Blumenthal, a theatre director from Berlin, Germany, was on holiday in Lauffen (now part of Bad Ischl), a small town in the vicinity of St. Wolfgang. There, at the inn where he was staying, Blumenthal happened to witness the head waiter's painful wooing of his boss, a widow. Amused, Blumenthal used the story as the basis of a comedy without music; which he co-authored with actor Gustav Kadelburg. However, Blumenthal and Kadelburg relocated the action from Lauffen to the much more prominent St. Wolfgang, where the actual Gasthof Weißes Rößl had existed since 1878. Having thus chanced upon a suitable title, the authors went to work, and Im weißen Rößl eventually premiered in Berlin in 1897.

The play was an immediate success. The Berlin audiences laughed at the comic portrayal of well-to-do city dwellers such as Wilhelm Giesecke, a manufacturer of underwear, and his daughter Ottilie, who have travelled all the way from Berlin to St. Wolfgang and now, on holiday, cannot help displaying many of the characteristics of the nouveaux-riches. "Wär' ick bloß nach Ahlbeck jefahren"—"If only I had gone to Ahlbeck", Giesecke sighs as he considers his unfamiliar surroundings and the strange dialect spoken by the wild mountain people that inhabit the Salzkammergut. At the same time the play promoted tourism in Austria, especially in and around St. Wolfgang, with a contemporary edition of the Baedeker praising the natural beauty of the region and describing the White Horse Inn as nicely situated at the lakefront next to where the steamboat can be taken for a romantic trip across the Wolfgangsee. The White Horse Inn was even awarded a Baedeker star.

Sydney Rosenfeld, a prolific American adapter of foreign plays, premièred an English version of the play titled At the White Horse Tavern at Wallack's Theatre in 1899, with a cast including Amelia Bingham and Leo Ditrichstein.

== The musical comedy ==
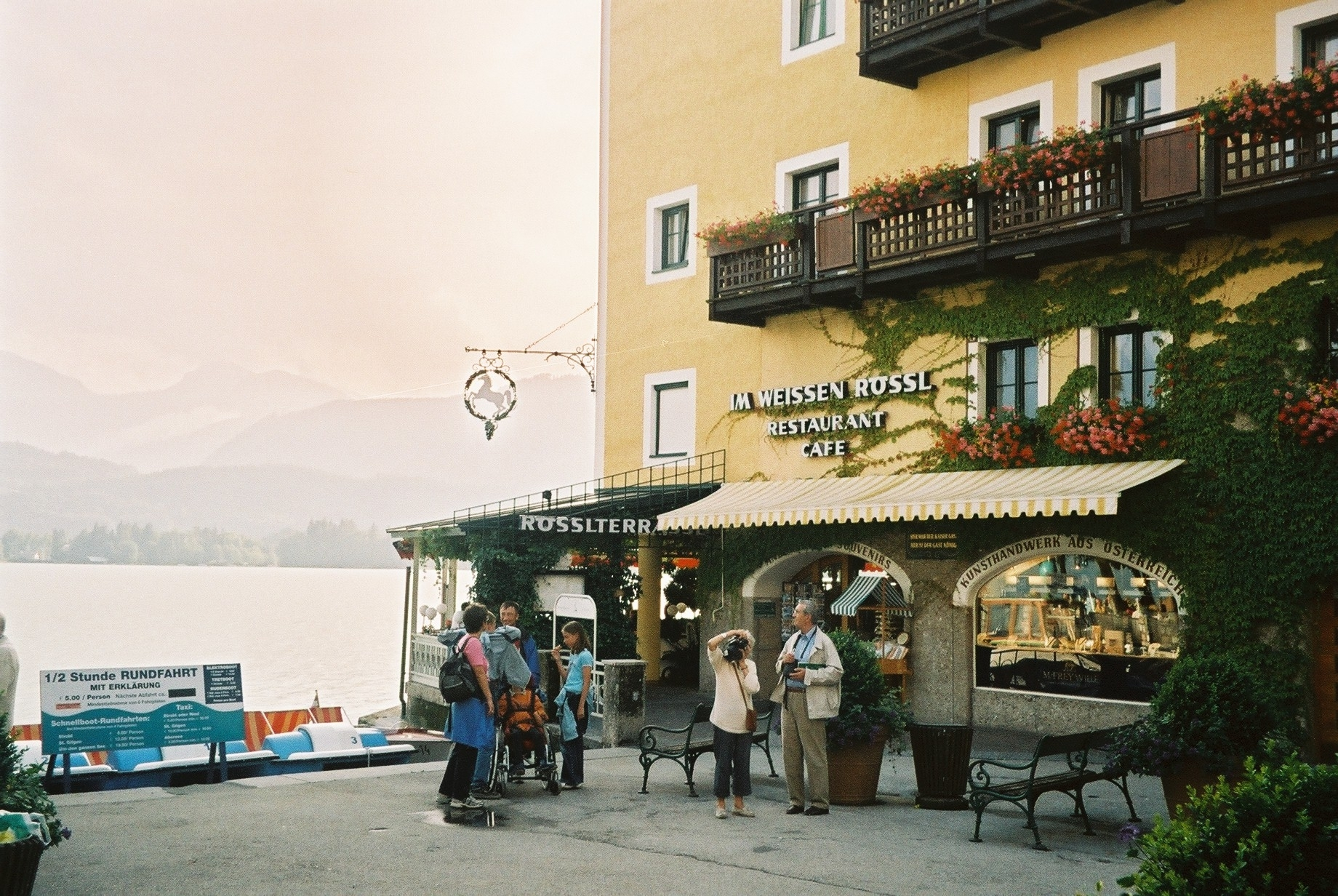
The White Horse Inn in 2004

Just as the play was about to be forgotten—a silent film The White Horse Inn directed by Richard Oswald and starring Liane Haid had been made in Germany in 1926—it was revived, again in Berlin, and this time as a musical comedy. During a visit to the Salzkammergut, the actor Emil Jannings told Berlin theatre manager Erik Charell about the comedy. Charell was interested and commissioned a group of prominent authors and composers to come up with a musical show based on Blumenthal and Kadelburg's play. They were Ralph Benatzky, Robert Stolz and Bruno Granichstaedten (music), Robert Gilbert (lyrics), Hans Müller-Einigen and Charell himself.

The show premiered in Berlin on 8 November 1930. Immediately afterwards it became a success around the world, with long runs in cities like London, Paris, Vienna, Munich and New York. During the Third Reich the comedy was marginalized and not performed (Goebbels called it "eine Revue, die uns heute zum Hals heraushängt"—"the kind of entertainment we find boring and superfluous today"), whereas people in the 1950s, keen on harmony and shallow pleasures, eagerly greeted revivals of the show. German-language films based on the musical comedy were made in 1935, 1952 and 1960.

== Roles ==
Roles, voice types, premiere cast
| Role | Voice type | Premiere cast, 8 November 1930 |
|---|---|---|
| Dr. Otto Siedler, lawyer | tenor | Otto Wallburg |
| Josepha Vogelhuber, landlady | soprano | Camilla Spira |
| Franz Joseph, emperor of Austria-Hungary | baritone | Paul Hörbiger |
| Wilhelm Giesecke, Berlin factory owner | spoken | Walter Jankuhn |
| Ottilie Giesecke, his daughter | soprano | Trude Lieske |
| Sigismund Sülzheimer, son of Giesecke's competitor | bass | Siegfried Arno |
| Professor Dr. Hinzelmann, tourist | baritone | |
| Klärchen Hinzelmann, his daughter | soprano | Käthe Lenz |
| Leopold Brandmeyer, waiter | tenor | Max Hansen |
| Piccolo, apprentice waiter | | Manasse Herbst |
| | | Laura Desni |
| | | Marianne Winkelstern |
| | | Willi Schaeffers |

== Synopsis ==
It is summertime at the Wolfgangsee. Josepha Vogelhuber, the young, attractive but resolute owner of the White Horse Inn, has been courted for some time by her head waiter, Leopold Brandmeyer. While appreciating his aptness for the job, she mistrusts all men as potential gold-diggers, rejects Leopold's advances and longingly waits for the arrival of Dr Siedler, a lawyer who has been one of her regular guests for many years. This year, Josepha hopes, Siedler might eventually propose to her.

When Siedler arrives, he finds himself in the very same place as Wilhelm Giesecke, his client Sülzheimer's business rival, and immediately falls in love with Giesecke's beautiful daughter Ottilie. As it happens, Sülzheimer's son Sigismund, a would-be beau, also arrives at the White Horse Inn. Angry at first about Siedler's presence at the same inn, Giesecke soon has the idea of marrying off his daughter to Sigismund Sülzheimer, thus turning a pending lawsuit into an advantageous business merger. However, Siedler's love is reciprocated by Ottilie, who adamantly refuses to marry Sigismund, while Sigismund himself has fallen for Klärchen Hinzelmann, a naive beauty who accompanies her professorial father on a tour through the Salzkammergut.

Seeing all this, Leopold Brandmeyer decides that he has had enough and quits his job. Josepha has also done a lot of thinking in the meantime, reconsiders her head waiter's proposal of marriage, and can persuade him to stay—not just as an employee but also as proprietor. Love gets its way with the other two couples as well, and the play ends with the prospect of a triple marriage.

== Musical numbers ==
- "Im weißen Rössl am Wolfgangsee" (Music: Ralph Benatzky)
- "Was kann der Sigismund dafür, dass er so schön ist" (Robert Gilbert)
- "Im Salzkammergut, da kann man gut lustig sein" (Ralph Benatzky)
- "Es muss was Wunderbares sein" (Ralph Benatzky)
- "Mein Liebeslied muss ein Walzer sein" (Robert Stolz)
- "Zuschaun kann i net" (Bruno Granichstaedten)
- "Die ganze Welt ist himmelblau" (Robert Stolz)

== Film adaptations ==
| | Germany 1926 (silent film based on the 1898 play) | Austria 1935 | West Germany 1952 | West Germany / Austria 1960 | Denmark / Austria 1964 | Germany 1994 (live performance at Berlin's "Bar jeder Vernunft") | Germany/Austria 2013 (Im weißen Rössl – Wehe Du singst! (In the White Horse Inn – Don't you dare sing!)) |
|---|---|---|---|---|---|---|---|
| directed by | Richard Oswald | Carl Lamac | Willi Forst | Werner Jacobs | Erik Balling | Ursli Pfister | Christian Theede |
| Josepha Vogelhuber | Liane Haid | Christl Mardayn | Johanna Matz | Waltraut Haas | Susse Wold | Fräulein Schneider | Edita Malovcic |
| Leopold Brandmeyer, head waiter | Max Hansen | Hermann Thimig | Walter Müller | Peter Alexander | Dirch Passer | Toni Pfister | Fritz Karl |
| Wilhelm Giesecke, industrialist from Berlin | Henry Bender | Willi Schaeffers | Paul Westermeier | Erik Jelde | Karl Stegger (named Julius Müller) | Gerd Wameling | Armin Rohde |
| Ottilie Giesecke, his daughter | Maly Delschaft | Annie Markart | Marianne Wischmann | Karin Dor (playing "Brigitte Giesecke") | N/A (This role has been combined with the character Klärchen) | Lilo Pfister | Diana Amft |
| Dr Siedler, lawyer | Livio Pavanelli | Fritz Odemar | Johannes Heesters | Adrian Hoven | N/A (This role has been combined with the character Sigismund) | Max Raabe | Tobias Licht |
| Professor Hinzelmann | Hermann Picha | Theo Lingen (playing "Kommerzienrat Fürst") | Sepp Nigg | Werner Finck | Paul Hagen (This role has been reduced to a supporting actor – a photographer) | Otto Sander | — |
| Klärchen Hinzelmann, his daughter | -?- | Marianne Stanior | Ingrid Pan | Estella Blain | Lone Hertz (named Klärchen Müller, daughter to Julius Müller, and combined with the character Ottilie) | Meret Becker | Julia Cencig |
| Sigismund Sülzheimer | -?- | -?- | Ulrich Beiger | Gunther Philipp | Ove Sprogøe (This role has been combined with the character Dr Siedler) | Ursli Pfister | Gregor Bloéb |
| Emperor Francis Joseph | -?- | — (action updated to the present) | Rudolf Forster | — (action updated to the present) | Peter Malberg | Walter Schmidinger | — (action updated to present) |

A post-war Argentinian movie in Spanish, La Hostería del caballito blanco, was directed by Benito Perojo and released in 1948. A Danish film of 1964 by Erik Balling, Sommer i Tyrol (although Tyrol is not the original setting), starred Dirch Passer and Susse Wold.

In addition, the musical triggered a number of spin-offs such as the 1961 Austrian comedy film Im schwarzen Rößl (The Black Horse Inn), directed by Franz Antel, about a young woman (surprisingly, it was Karin Dor again, who had just played Giesecke's daughter in the 1960 version) who inherits a dilapidated hotel on the shores of the Wolfgangsee. As a matter of fact, a number of hotels in St. Wolfgang do use similar names (Black Horse, White Stag, etc.).

Most recently, a new musical film adaptation of "Im Weissen Rössl" came out in November 2013 with the German title Im weißen Rössl – Wehe Du singst! from director Christian Theede. Unlike its predecessors, however, the movie was not filmed on location at the Hotel Im Weissen Rössl in St. Wolfgang, Austria.
