= Cheval Blanc =

Cheval blanc or Cheval-Blanc, French for white horse, may refer to:

- Château Cheval Blanc, a wine producer in Saint-Émilion in the Bordeaux wine region of France
- Cheval-Blanc, Vaucluse, in southern France
  - Canton of Cheval-Blanc
- Le Cheval Blanc (brewpub), in Montreal
- Le Cheval Blanc (mountain), in the Alps
- Cheval Blanc, St Barths, a luxury hotel in St Barths
- Cheval Blanc (restaurant), Heemstede, the Netherlands

== See also ==
- White Horse (disambiguation)
