= Jankuhn =

Jankuhn is a German surname. Notable people with the surname include:

- Herbert Jankuhn (1905–1990) German archaeologist
- Klaus Jankuhn (born 1965), German record producer and musician
- Walter Jankuhn (1888–1953), German tenor singer and actor, performed e.g. in Lotte
