= White Horse Inn (Broadway version) =

- Operetta by Ralph Benatzky
- Librettist: David Freedman
- Based on: Im weißen Rößl
- Premiere: 1 October 1936; Center Theatre (New York City)

White Horse Inn is the title of the Broadway version of the operetta Im weißen Rößl. The original operetta by Erik Charell and composers Ralph Benatzky and Robert Stolz was based on the popular farce of the same name by Oscar Blumenthal and Gustav Kadelburg. It was premiered at Berlin's Großes Schauspielhaus on 8 November 1930 and ran for 416 performances. The Broadway version was premiered on 1 October 1936 at the Center Theatre in New York City. It had a libretto by David Freedman and lyrics by Irving Caesar. The original score was re-orchestrated by Hans Spialek.

== Background ==
White Horse Inn opened in New York on 1 October 1936, at the Center Theatre. In 1931, Jacob Wilk, executive for Warner Brothers Films, had approached Erik Charell with regard to a possible American production of White Horse Inn. But it was not until February 1936 that The New York Times finally disclosed that a triumvirate of producers – Rowland Stebbins, Warner Brothers and the Rockefellers – would present White Horse Inn. "Such delay was due to the depression shortage of investment capital for large scale musicals, and a reluctance to mount Graham's translation, penned in an 'old-fashioned operetta' style".

Rather than Americanizing Harry Graham's UK script, Charell produced an all-new, all-American adaptation of the German text and lyrics. Broadway audiences preferred musical comedy rather than nostalgic operetta and that was what Charell intended to offer. In the opinion of Richard C. Norton, Broadway's White Horse Inn is "closer to the Berlin version in its farcical style".

David Freedman was ultimately contracted to prepare the new American libretto. At the time of his signing, he was one of the best known radio script writers. Irving Caesar was in charge of the lyrics. "Freedman's script is more contemporary and playful than Harry Graham's language in the London's version. The interpolations to the musical score and Irving Caesar's lyrics are equally modern.”

The whole score was freshly orchestrated by Hans Spialek. Scenery and costumes were designed by Professor Ernst Stern. Richard Watts stated in the New York Herald Tribune: "A beautiful colorful and sufficiently lively show...It is my private opinion that White Horse Inn is several times livelier than the previous European spectacle The Great Waltz, and at least as handsome".

White Horse Inn closed on Saturday, 10 April 1937, after 221 performances. In late March, according to The New York Times, the production had posted a profit in 25 out of 28 weeks of its run.

As in London, the basic narrative structure of the German original remained intact, but many more musical numbers were dropped or replaced. Characters' names and much of the topical humor were Americanized. Charell presented a cartoon-like Austrian emperor Franz Josef as a deus-ex-machina who restores happiness to all. His arrival in St Wolfgang gave Charell the opportunity to pull out all the stops and offer a spectacle of color. "If the original German Giesecke's character became purely comic transposed to London with its Hercules combination and Shirt-o-pants underwear, Freedman in the USA offered a sexier alternative with ladies' swimwear and his "Lady Godiva" suit, which would have made the girls appear naked, with buttons down the front" argues Richard C. Norton. This ensured that this Alpine romp was far from old-fashioned, but instead "an erotic spectacle that left audiences gasping".

As a librettist, Freedman was known as a writer of racy revue sketches for the Ziegfeld Follies. American shows were not bound by cinema's production code introduced in 1934. Indeed, Broadway shows of the decade were arguably sexier than film as a means of attracting a more sophisticated audience who could afford theatre ticket prices, whereas film from 1934 onwards was sanitized for a national, mid-west and more conservative, viewership.

On the other hand, as Richard Clarke states, some aspects had to be adapted for the more puritan American audiences, taking into account the context. The Nazis were not amused to see Aryan culture mixed with so called 'Nigger Jazz' by a group of theatre people who were not only mostly Jewish but also homosexual (Benatzky excepted on both counts). They considered Im weissen Rössl scandalous, especially the Esther Williams-style swimming pool scene in which the near-naked girls and boys emerged from the water ballet in a grand dance routine. For that reason, the bathing scene was not allowed and had to be changed, in order to tone down the nudity. In the same way, the homosexual aspects in general were erased for American audiences. Regarding the music, many jazz elements of the original were adapted, so that the modern aspects were reduced for a more folkloristic version.

== Plot ==
Josepha Vogelhuber, widowed proprietress of the inn, is largely indifferent to the amorous intentions of her headwaiter, Leopold. Josepha prefers Dr. Otto Siedler, a visiting city solicitor who eyes fellow hotel guest Ottilie, daughter of a brash Berlin manufacturer, Giesecke. Sigismund Sülzheimer, son of Giesecke's business rival, has been sent by his father to marry Ottilie. But Sigismund ends up with yet another lady-on-holiday (lisping Klärchen), while Ottilie waltzes off with "The Devil's Advocate", as her father calls Dr. Siedler. This leaves Josepha heartbroken and Leopold insane with jealousy. None other than Emperor Franz Josef himself intercedes to dispense his own gentle wisdom to Josepha. By curtain fall, she yields to Leopold's wooing, Sigismund marries Klärchen, and Ottilie Dr. Siedler. Giesecke finally succumbs to the charms of St. Wolfgang and asks his new son-in-law to map out a peace treaty with the Sülzheimer family.

== Americanization of the names ==
- Josepha became Katarina Vogelhuber.
- Wilhelm Giesecke/John Ebenezer Grinkle, became William McGonigle, manufacturer of the one-piece Lady Godiva bathing suit, which buttons up the front with no back.
- Sigismund Sülzheimer/Smith, was reinvented as Sylvester S. Somerset, a Massachusetts manufacturer of the Goona Goona, with buttons in the back, none in front.
- McGonigle's daughter Ottilie/Ottoline was renamed Natalie.
- Otto Siedler, later Valentine Sutton in London, reappeared as Donald Hutton.
- Kathi, postmistress, became Hanni, to avoid confusion with the starring Katarina.

== Cast ==
- Leopold Brandmeyer, the Head Waiter: William Gaxton
- Katarina Vogelhuber, Proprietress of the White Horse Inn: Kitty Carlisle
- William McGonigle: Billy House
- Natalie, his daughter: Carol Stone
- Donald Hutton: Robert Halliday
- Professor Hinzelman: Frederick Graham
- Gretel, his Daughter: Melissa Mason
- Sylvester S. Somerset, Jr.: Buster West
- The Emperor: Arnold Korff
- Cook's Guide and Serenader: Anthony Marlowe

== Musical numbers ==
English version (1931)	American version (1936)
Act 1
Yodel Song	
O’er Valley and Hill	
Touring Number	
Entrance of Tourists (Benatzky)	Arrival of Tourists (Benatzky)
	*Leave it to Katarina (Jara Benes)
It Would Be Wonderful (Benatzky)	I Cannot Live without Your Love (Benatzky)
Entrance of Steamer (Benatzky)	Arrival of Steamboat (Benatzky)
White Horse Inn (Benatzky)	White Horse Inn (Benatzky)
Happy Cows	*Cowshed Rhapsody (Gelbtrunk)
Spade Number – Specialty Dance (Benatzky)	Spade Ballet (Benatzky)
Your Eyes (Stolz)	Blue Eyes (Stolz)
It Would Be Wonderful (reprise)	
Rain Finale (Benatzky)	Rain Finale (Benatzky)
Act 2
Opening chorus (Benatzky)	Market Day in the Village (Benatzky)
Good-Bye (Stolz)	*Goodbye, Au Revoir, Auf Wiedersehn (Coates)
You Too (Stolz)	
Salzkammergut (Benatzky))	High Up on the Hills (Benatzky)
Bathing	
Fairies	
	*I Would Love to Have You Love Me (Caesar-Lerner-Marks)
Alpine Number	*Alpine Symphony (Gelbtrunk)
Why Should We Cry for the Moon	
Procession (Finale)	Welcome on the Landing Stage (Benatzky)
Act 3
Softly	
In This Fickle World (Benatzky)	Serenade to the Emperor (Benatzky)
White Horse Inn (reprise)	
In This Fickle World (reprise)	We Prize Most the Things We Miss (Benatzky)
On the Trail	
My Song of Love (Stolz)	*The Waltz of Love (Leo Fall)
Sigismund (reprise))	
Good-Bye (reprise)	
Finale	Finale

The differences between the musical numbers of the British and the American versions can be seen in the tables above. The numbers which are new in the Broadway version are marked with the symbol: (*).

Erik Charell and his American producers took a free hand adapting the original Berlin score. For example, the producers demanded the obligatory introductory song for their heroine, and thus Katarina and ensemble were given a new Jára Benes song "Leave It to Katarina" which many critics admired.

While Im weißen Rößl in its multiple international productions always freely accommodated musical interpolations, Charell and the American producers sabotaged one of the show's greatest strengths, its hit score. Only three recognizable hit tunes ("The White Horse Inn", "Blue Eyes", and "I Cannot Live Without Your Love") were retained, but with new lyrics. None of the new songs achieved any popularity whatsoever. The only plausible rationale is that Warner Brothers, as was the then-common practice with musical films among all Hollywood studios, often junked a show's original stage score for other new and inferior songs they owned.

== Critical reaction ==
White Horse Inn was a lavish musical theatre premier of the New York season, a season which also included Billy Rose's Jumbo. Advance word of the show's previous success created expectations. White Horse Inn elicited also a handful of rave notices from the most influential critics in New York.

Brooks Atkinson wrote in The New York Times: "A hospitable evening seasoned by good taste in lavish showmanship". White Horse Inn was advertised in the daily papers: "Music, maids and minstrels by the million. The biggest thing in town for the money."

== Recordings ==
Cast album

There is a cast album out on Sepia Records with the original 1936 Broadway cast. It is largely a live radio broadcast, when the cast came to a radio show to promote White Horse Inn. It consists of about 10 minutes of the show, but augmented to 20 minutes from a rare New York radio broadcast with British and German period recordings which best illustrate the melodic charms of this musical extravaganza.

While original cast recordings were commonly made from a show's hit songs in Berlin, London and Paris at the time, the practice in New York was not as widespread until the Oklahoma! 78rpm cast album won a huge public in 1943. For that reason, there was not any American recording of any songs in the White Horse Inn's score made during the New York run until this tape was found in 2009.

== Notes ==
=== References ===
- White Horse Inn at the Internet Broadway Database
- Clarke, Kevin; Norton, Richard (2009). "'Baedecker gone-mad. An experience not to be missed' The International Success of Im weißen Rössl/White Horse Inn". White Horse Inn (Media notes). Sepia Records.
- Norton, Richard C. (2006). Ulrich Tadday (ed.). "≫So this is Broadway≪ Die abenteuerliche Reise des Rössl durch die englischsprachige Welt". Musik-Konzepte. Im weißen Rössl – Zwischen Kunst und Kommerz (133–134). Munich: Edition Text+Kritik: 151–170. ISBN 9783883778419. See also: Richard C. Norton (1 September 2006). "The English Language Adventures of Im weißen Rössl". Operetta Research Center.
- Norton, Richard (2008). "Cast List and Musical Numbers of the London Production 1931". ralph-benatzky.com. Archived from the original on February 25, 2014.; "Cast List and Musical Numbers of the Broadway Production 1936". Archived from the original on February 22, 2014.
