= Anthony Marlowe =

Anthony Marlowe may refer to:

- Anthony Marlowe (actor) (1913–1975), British stage, film and television actor
- Anthony Marlowe (politician) (1904–1965), British barrister and politician
- Anthony Marlowe (tenor) (1905–1962), American tenor, actor, and conductor

== See also ==
- Tony Marlow (born 1940), British former Conservative politician who served as Member of Parliament (MP) between 1979 and 1997.
