= Oscar Blumenthal =

German playwright and drama critic

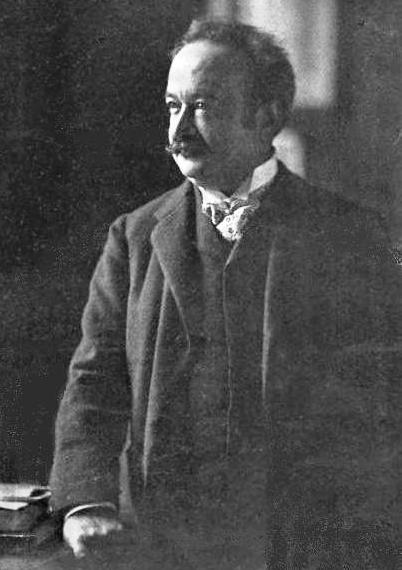
- Oscar Blumenthal in 1905
- Born: 13 March 1852; Berlin, Kingdom of Prussia
- Died: 24 April 1917 (aged 65); Berlin, German Empire
- Education: Leipzig University
- Occupations: Playwright, drama critic
- Writing career
- Language: German
- Genres: Theatre, theatre criticism

Oscar Blumenthal (or Oskar Blumenthal; 13 March 1852 – 24 April 1917) was a German playwright and drama critic.

== Biography ==
Blumenthal was educated at the gymnasium and the university of his native town in Berlin, and at Leipzig University, where he received a Doctor of Philosophy in 1872. After having been editor of the Deutsche Dichterhalle in Leipzig, in 1873 he founded the Neue Monatshefte für Dichtkunst und Kritik. In 1875, Blumenthal moved to Berlin, where he became theatrical critic of the Berliner Tageblatt, holding this position until 1887, when he opened the Lessing Theater, of which he was director till 1898. From 1894 to 1895 he was also director of the Berliner Theater. From 1898 he was engaged exclusively in literary work.

Blumenthal was well known as a critic and playwright. His critiques in the feuilletons of the newspapers sparkle with humour, at the same time doing justice to authors and actors. Because of their sharpness he was sometimes called "bloody Oscar". His plays were successful, and many of them were well received at the leading German theatres. Together with Gustav Kadelburg he wrote several comedies like the famous The White Horse Inn. As a researcher in literature, he became famous for editing and annotating works of Christian Dietrich Grabbe. He also was successful as a theatrical manager.

Blumenthal is also known for his humorous aphorisms, for example:

Das ist ein hässliches Gebrechen,
Wenn Menschen wie die Bücher sprechen.
Doch reich und fruchtbar sind für jeden
Die Bücher, die wie Menschen reden.

(It is a terrible flaw
When people speak like books,
But good and useful for everyone
Are books that speak like people).

== Works ==
Blumenthal was the author of many plays and novels, among which may be mentioned:

- He also, in 1874, edited and annotated Christ. Dietr. Grabbe's Sämmtliche Werke und handschriftlicher Nachlaß [Christian Dietrich Grabbe's Complete Works and Manuscript Literary Estate] (4 Vols.; Erste kritische Gesamtausgabe [1st critical complete ed.]). See: Christian Dietrich Grabbe (1801–1836) (in German). Detmold: Meyersche Hofbuchhandlung [Meyer's Court Bookshop] – via HathiTrust. LCCN 03-19713, LCCN 17-23391; OCLC 1553623854 (all editions).
- Allerhand Ungezogenheiten, Leipzig, 1874, 5th ed., 1877;
- Für alle Wagen- und Menschenklassen, ib. 1875;
- Bummelbriefe, Danzig, 1880;
- Gesammelte Epigramme, 1890
- Merkzettel, 1898;
- Verbotene Stücke, 1900;

=== Plays ===
- Der Probepfeil (1883)
- Frau Venus (with Ernst Pasqué, 1883)
- Die grosse Glocke (1884)
- Ein Tropfen Gift (1885)
- Der schwarze Schleier (1886)
- Anton Antony (1887)
- Der Zaungast (1889)
- Das zweite Gesicht (1890)
- Die Großstadtluft (with Gustav Kadelburg, 1891) (produced in English by Augustin Daly as A Test Case: Or, Grass Versus Granite; modern title: A Marriage Contract)
- Heute und Gestern (1891)
- Die Orientreise (with Gustav Kadelburg, 1892) (produced in English by Augustin Daly as The Orient Express, translated by F. C. Burnand)
- Mauerblümchen (with Gustav Kadelburg, 1893)
- Paulas Geheimnis (1893)
- Zwei Wappen (with Gustav Kadelburg, 1894) (English adaptation: The Two Escutcheons, by Sydney Rosenfeld)
- Gräfin Fritzi (1895)
- Das Einmaleins (1896)
- Hans Huckebein (with Gustav Kadelburg, 1897) (English adaptation: Number 9 – The Lady of Ostend, by F. C. Burnand)
- Auf der Sonnenseite (with Gustav Kadelburg, 1898)
- Matthias Gollinger (with Max Bernstein, 1898)
- The White Horse Inn (with Gustav Kadelburg, 1898) (First English adaptation: At the White Horse Tavern, by Sydney Rosenfeld)
- Als ich wiederkam (with Gustav Kadelburg, 1899, sequel to The White Horse Inn) (English adaptation: Twelve Months Later)
- Die strengen Herren (with Gustav Kadelburg, 1900)
- Die Fee Caprice (1901)
- Das Theaterdorf (with Gustav Kadelburg, 1902)
- Der blinde Passagier (with Gustav Kadelburg, 1902)
- Der letzte Funke (with Gustav Kadelburg, 1906)
- Die Tür ins Freie (with Gustav Kadelburg, 1908) (English adaptation: Is Matrimony a Failure?, 1909, by Leo Ditrichstein)
- Die große Pause (with Max Bernstein, 1915)
- Die Schöne vom Strand (with Gustav Kadelburg, 1915, musical version of Hans Huckebein, music by Victor Hollaender)

=== Films based on his works ===
- Is Matrimony a Failure?, directed by James Cruze (1922, based on the play Die Tür ins Freie)
- When I Came Back, directed by Richard Oswald (1926, based on the play Als ich wiederkam)
- The White Horse Inn, directed by Richard Oswald (1926, based on the play The White Horse Inn)
- The Long Intermission, directed by Carl Froelich (1927, based on the play Die große Pause)
- The White Horse Inn, directed by Karel Lamač (1935, based on the operetta The White Horse Inn)
- White Horse Inn, directed by Benito Perojo (Argentina, 1948, based on the operetta The White Horse Inn)
- The White Horse Inn, directed by Willi Forst (1952, based on the operetta The White Horse Inn)
- The White Horse Inn, directed by Werner Jacobs (1960, based on the operetta The White Horse Inn)
- Summer in Tyrol, directed by Erik Balling (Denmark, 1964, based on the operetta The White Horse Inn)
- The White Horse Inn, directed by Christian Theede (2013, based on the operetta The White Horse Inn)

== Bibliography ==
=== Inline references ===
- The Encyclopedia Americana (30 Vols.). George Edwin Rines (1860–1951), ed. New York and Chicago: The Encyclopedia Americana Corporation. 1918–1920 [1922–1924]. LCCN 18-16023 (1918–1920), LCCN 22-1305 (1922); OCLC 2926217 (all editions).
- Vol. 4 ["Birds of Paradise" – "Bulfinch"]. "Blumenthal, blo͞o' mĕn-täl, Oskar". 1918. p. 132. Via Internet Archive (Harvard).
- Vol. 4 ["Birds of Paradise" – "Bulfinch"]. "Blumenthal, blo͞o' mĕn-täl, Oskar". 1922. p. 132. Via Internet Archive (Library of Congress).; Via Google Books (Iowa).; Via Wikisource.; Via Wikimedia Commons (Library of Congress).
- Gilman, Daniel Coit (1831–1908); Peck, Harry Thurston (1856–1914); Colby, Frank Moore (1865–1925) (eds.). The New International Encyclopædia. 1902–1904 (17 Vols.); 1905–1909 (20 Vols.) (1st ed.). New York: Dodd, Mead and Company. LCCN 02-18468, LCCN 11-1590; OCLC 369176 (all editions).
- Vol. 3 ["Bes'sus–Cairns"]. "Blumenthal, Oskar". 1906 [1905, 1902]. p. 206. Via HathiTrust (NYPL). 1905.; Via Internet Archive (Ontario Council of University Libraries – OCUL). 1902.; Via Internet Archive (UC San Diego). 1906.; Via Wikisource. 1905.; Via Wikimedia Commons (UC San Diego). 1906.
- The Jewish Encyclopedia (12 Vols. + online). Isidore Singer, PhD, Managing Editor, et al. New York and London: Funk and Wagnalls Company. 1901–1906. LCCN 2004-565027 (online); LCCN 01-9359, LCCN 25-14669, LCCN 16-14703, LCCN 06-12175; OCLC 269638 (all editions), OCLC 4743907 (all editions), OCLC 1142814 (all editions).
- Hannemann, Frederick (Fritz) Theodore, M.D. (later surname Haneman; 1863–1950) (1902). Vol. 3: "Blumenthal, Oskar". p. 275. Via Internet Archive (Kahle/Austin Foundation; Concordia College, withdrawn).; Via Wikimedia Commons (page-view from PDF; digital image 310) (Internet Archive; Cornell).; Via blog reproduction (Kopelman Foundation).
- Meyer, Hermann Julius (1826–1909), ed. (1893–1897) [1901]. Meyers Konversations-Lexikon aka Meyers Konv. Lexikon (in German). Leipzig and Vienna: Bibliographisches Institut. OCLC 1251857996 (all editions), OCLC 38223144 (all editions), OCLC 1408728942 (all editions), OCLC 3441650 (all editions), 39869690.
- Vol. 3 – "Biot bis Chemikalien": 2) "Oskar". 1893. p. 112. Via Google Books (UC Library).
- Meyer, Hermann Julius (1826–1909), ed. (1899–1900). Meyers Kleines Konversations-Lexikon [Meyer's Small Conversational Encyclopedia] (new ed.; 3 Vols.) (in German). Leipzig and Vienna: Bibliographisches Institut.
- Vol. 1 – "A bis Golther". "Blumenthal": 2) "Oskar". 1899. p. 307. Via Google Books (Cal Berkeley).
- Meyer, Hermann Julius (1826–1909), ed. (1910–1914). Meyers Kleines Konversations-Lexikon [Meyer's Small Conversational Encyclopedia] (7th revised and enlarged ed., updated with a supplementary volume; 7 Vols.) (in German). Leipzig and Vienna: Bibliographisches Institut. LCCN 24-5850; OCLC 1044598 (all editions).
- Vol. 7: Ergänzungen und Nachträge [Additions and Supplements]. "Blumenthal, Oskar". 1914. p. 84. Via Internet Archive (UC Riverside).; Via Google Books (UC Riverside).
- See: Category: Meyers Konversations-Lexikon, 5. Auflage [5th ed.] – via Wikimedia Commons.; Meyers Konversations-Lexikon – via Wikipedia.; Meyers Konversations-Lexikon (in German) – via Wikisource.
- The Theatre. New Series: Vol. 1 (1878) – Vol. 30 (1897). London: Simpkin, Marshall, Hamilton, Kent, & Co. LCCN sn77-10041; ISSN 0563-3923; OCLC 2451104 (all editions).
- "At the Play": "In Berlin" (re: Hans Huckebein). Vol. 30 (July–December 1897). 1 December 1897. pp. 324–325. Via Internet Archive.

=== General references ===
- Brockhaus' Konversations-Lexikon [Brockhaus's Conversational Encyclopedia]. (14th fully revised ed.; 17 Vols. + Supplement) (in German). Leipzig, Berlin, Vienna: F.A. Brockhaus. 1896–1898. LCCN 06-24022, LCCN 06-24021; OCLC 5695066 (all editions).
- Vol. 3: "Bill – Catulus". 1898. p. 154. Entry: "Blumenthal, Oskar" – via Internet Archive (University of Wisconsin).
- Vol. 3: "Biserta – Cesnola". (reprint of 14th ed.). 1901. p. 114. Entry: "Blumenthal, Oskar" – via Internet Archive (Harvard).
