= It's You I Have Loved =

1929 film

- Dutch theatrical release poster
- Directed by: Rudolf Walther-Fein
- Written by: Walter Reisch
- Starring: Mady Christians; Walter Jankuhn; Hans Stüwe; Karl Platen
- Cinematography: Karl Brodmerkel; Walter Janssen
- Music by: Bruno Balz; Werner Schmidt-Boelcke
- Production company: Aafa-Film
- Distributed by: Aafa-Film
- Release date: 30 November 1929
- Running time: 102 minutes
- Country: Germany
- Language: German

It's You I Have Loved (German: Dich hab ich geliebt) is a 1929 German drama film directed by Rudolf Walther-Fein and starring Mady Christians, Walter Jankuhn, and Hans Stüwe. It is considered the first full sound film to be made in Germany (following part-sound films which had been released earlier in the year). When it was released in the United States, the film's plot was compared to that of The Jazz Singer. It is also known as Because I Loved You.

== Cast ==
- Mady Christians as Inge Lund
- Walter Jankuhn as Otto Radney
- Hans Stüwe as Dr. Hubert Baumgart
- Karl Platen as Kecgber
- Sophie Pagay as Frau Werner
- Trude Berliner as Edith Karin
- Fritz Alberti as Körner
- Hans Mierendorff as Director Sommer
- Jaro Fürth as Brink
- Hans Sternberg as Theaterdirektor
- Hermann Picha as Inspizient
- Manfred Koempel-Pilot as Conferencier
- Marion Conradi as Mariechen

== See also ==
- List of early sound feature films (1926–1929)

== Bibliography ==
- Crafton, Donald (1999). The Talkies: American Cinema's Transition to Sound, 1926–1931. Berkeley: University of California Press. ISBN 978-0-520-22128-4.
- Kreimeier, Klaus (1999). The Ufa Story: A History of Germany's Greatest Film Company, 1918–1945. Berkeley: University of California Press. ISBN 978-0-520-22069-0.
