= Hussar Fever =

1925 film

- Directed by: Georg Jacoby
- Written by: Hans Brennert; Georg Jacoby; Gustaf Kadelburg (play); Richard Skowronnek (play)
- Starring: Max Hansen; Georg Alexander; Jakob Tiedtke
- Cinematography: Max Schneider
- Production company: Ungo-Film
- Distributed by: Filmhaus Bruckmann
- Release date: 21 April 1925
- Country: Germany
- Languages: Silent; German intertitles

Hussar Fever (German: Husarenfieber) is a 1925 German silent comedy film directed by Georg Jacoby and starring Max Hansen, Georg Alexander and Jakob Tiedtke.

The film's sets were designed by the art director Robert A. Dietrich.

== Cast ==
- Max Hansen
- Georg Alexander
- Jakob Tiedtke
- Edith Meller
- Elga Brink
- Paul Otto
- Paul Heidemann
- Paula Eberty
- Edith Heuss
- Arnold Korff
- Rudolf Maas
- Hans Mierendorff
- Waldemar Potier as Kind
- Lotte Stein
- Hans Wassmann
