= Joseph Meyer (publisher) =

German industrialist and publisher (1796–1856)

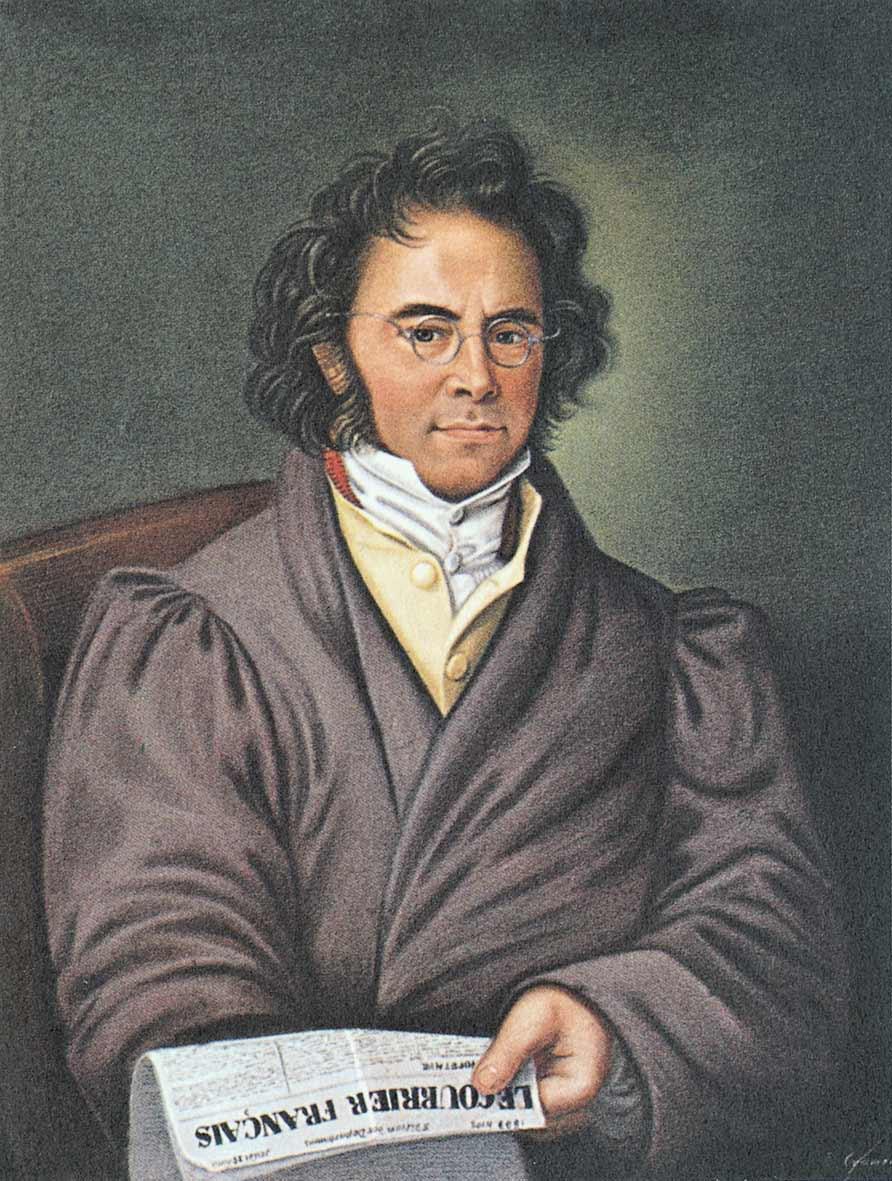
- Joseph Meyer circa 1840
- Born: 9 May 1796; Gotha, Holy Roman Empire
- Died: 27 June 1856 (aged 60)
- Occupations: industrialist and publisher
- Known for: Creating the encyclopaedia, Meyers Konversations-Lexikon

Joseph Meyer (9 May 1796 - 27 June 1856) was a German industrialist and publisher, most noted for his encyclopaedia, Meyers Konversations-Lexikon.

== Early life ==
Meyer was born at Gotha, Germany, and was educated as a merchant in Frankfurt am Main.

== Career ==
He went to London in 1816, but returned to Germany in 1820 after business adventures and stock speculations fell through. Here he invested in enterprises such as the textile trade (1820–24). Soon after the first steam-hauled railway had started in December 1835, Meyer started to make business plans to start the first railways. He also bought some concessions for iron mining. In 1845 he founded the Deutsche Eisenbahnschienen-Compagnie auf Actien (German Railway Rail joint stock company).

Meyer operated very successfully as a publisher, employing a system of serial subscription to publications, which was new at that time. To this end he founded a company, Bibliographisches Institut, in Gotha in 1826. It published several editions of the Bible, works of classical literature ("Miniatur-Bibliothek der deutschen Classiker", "Meyers Groschen-Bibliothek der Deutschen Classiker für alle Stände"), the world in pictures on steel engravings ("Meyers Universum", 1833–61, 17 volumes in 12 languages with 80,000 subscribers all over Europe), and an encyclopaedia, ("das Grosse Conversations-Lexikon für die gebildeten Stände"; see Meyers Konversations-Lexikon, 1839–55, 52 volumes). His company grew substantially, and in 1828 he moved it from Gotha to Hildburghausen, where he died thirty years later. He became involved in cartography, producing many atlases with steel-engraved maps printed from steel plates, including Meyer's Groẞer Hand-Atlas (1843-1860).

In 1830, inspired by new of the July Revolution in France, Meyer founded newspapers that promoted the liberal ideals of the revolutionaries. In 1848 he supported the revolutions that took place throughout Germany and much of Europe, and in 1849 was briefly imprisoned for his revolutionary activities. His publishing and other businesses prospered, and by 1910 his grandsons constituted the richest family in the Saxon territories, with more total wealth than the King of Saxony.

== Death and legacy ==
After Meyer's death in 1856, his son Herrmann Julius Meyer took over the Bibliographisches Institut, which was at that time struggling financially.
