= White Night =

White night, White Night, or White Nights may refer to:

- White night (astronomy), a night in which it never gets completely dark, at high latitudes outside the Arctic and Antarctic Circles
- White Night festivals, all-night arts festivals held in many cities worldwide in the summer
- White Nights Festival, an annual arts festival in St. Petersburg, Russia during the season of the midnight sun

== Literature ==
- White Night, a 2004 novel by Keigo Higashino
- White Night (Butcher novel), a 2007 book by Jim Butcher
- White Nights (Begin book), a 1957 book by Menachem Begin, the sixth Prime Minister of Israel
- "White Nights" (short story) by Fyodor Dostoevsky in 1848

== Film and TV ==
- White Night (1968 film), a South Korean romantic drama
- White Night (2009 film), a South Korean mystery thriller
- White Night (2012 film), a South Korean romantic drama
- White Night (2017 film), a Canadian comedy-drama anthology
- White Nights (1916 film), a Hungarian silent drama film
- White Nights (1957 film), an Italian romantic melodrama film
- White Nights (1959 film), a Soviet drama film
- White Nights (1985 film), a 1985 American musical drama film
- Night Light (TV series), a South Korean TV series also known as White Nights

== Music ==
- White Nights (soundtrack), the soundtrack for the 1985 film, White Nights
- White Night (album), 2017, Taeyang's third studio album
- "White Night", a song by Amorphis from the 2015 album Under the Red Cloud
- "White Nights" (song), a 2011 song by Oh Land
- White Nights (radio), 2006 series
- White Night World Tour, a 2017 concert tour by South Korean singer Taeyang

== Other uses ==
- White Night (Jonestown), practice at Peoples Temple Agricultural Project, aka Jonestown
- White Nights (badminton), an open international badminton tournament in Russia
- White Night riots, 1979 riots in San Francisco after lenient sentencing of assassin Dan White (unrelated to the astronomical phenomenon)
- White Night (video game), a 2015 video game by Activision

== See also ==
- Nuit Blanche, an annual all-night or night-time arts festival
- White knight (disambiguation)
