= The Son of Hannibal (1926 film) =

1926 film

- German: Der Sohn des Hannibal
- Directed by: Felix Basch
- Written by: Felix Basch; Richard Hutter
- Based on: Der Sohn des Hannibal by Ludwig Wolff
- Produced by: Paul Ebner; Maxim Galitzenstein
- Starring: Liane Haid; Alfons Fryland; Ferdinand von Alten
- Cinematography: Franz Planer
- Music by: Werner R. Heymann
- Production company: Maxim-Film
- Distributed by: UFA
- Release date: 23 December 1926
- Country: Germany
- Languages: Silent; German intertitles

The Son of Hannibal (German: Der Sohn des Hannibal) is a 1926 German silent film directed by Felix Basch and starring Liane Haid, Alfons Fryland, and Ferdinand von Alten.

The film's art direction was by Robert Neppach.

== Cast ==
- Liane Haid
- Alfons Fryland
- Ferdinand von Alten
- Albert Paulig
- Sig Arno
- Alexander Murski
- Bruno Arno
- Nikolai Malikoff
- Manasse Herbst
