= When I Came Back =

1926 film directed by Richard Oswald

- Directed by: Richard Oswald
- Written by: Oskar Blumenthal (play); Gustaf Kadelburg (play); Lothar Knud Frederik; Alfred Halm
- Produced by: Richard Oswald
- Starring: Liane Haid; Max Hansen; Henry Bender
- Cinematography: Arpad Viragh
- Music by: Hans May
- Production company: Richard-Oswald-Produktion
- Distributed by: Süd-Film
- Release date: 17 December 1926
- Country: Germany
- Languages: Silent; German intertitles

When I Came Back (German: Als ich wiederkam) is a 1926 German silent film directed by Richard Oswald and starring Liane Haid, Max Hansen, and Henry Bender. The film is a sequel to The White Horse Inn (1926) and is based on the play Als ich wiederkam (English title: Twelve Months Later).

It was made at the Emelka Studios in Munich.

== Cast ==
- Liane Haid as Josefa Vogelhuber
- Max Hansen as Leopold Brandmayer
- Henry Bender as Wilhelm Giesecke
- Livio Pavanelli as Dr. Siedler
- Maly Delschaft as Ottilie Giesecke
- Hermann Picha as Hinzelmann, Privatgelehrter
- Ferdinand Bonn
- Anton Pointner
- Anita Dorris

== Bibliography ==
- Hans-Michael Bock and Tim Bergfelder. The Concise Cinegraph: An Encyclopedia of German Cinema. Berghahn Books.
