= The Lady, or the Tiger? =

Short story by Frank Stockton

"The Lady, or the Tiger?" was the title story in an 1884 collection of twelve stories by Frank R. Stockton published by Scribner.

"The Lady, or the Tiger?" is a much-anthologized short story written by Frank R. Stockton for publication in the November issue of The Century Magazine in 1882. "The Lady, or the Tiger?" has entered the English language as an allegorical expression, a shorthand indication or signifier, for a problem that is unsolvable.

== Plot summary ==
A "semi-barbaric" king rules a land sometime in the past. Some of the king's ideas are progressive, but others cause people to suffer. One of the king's innovations is the use of a public trial by ordeal as "an agent of poetic justice", with guilt or innocence decided by the result of chance. A person accused of a crime is brought into a public arena and must choose one of two doors. Behind one door is a lady whom the king has deemed an appropriate match for the accused; behind the other is a fierce, hungry tiger. Both doors are heavily soundproofed to prevent the accused from hearing what is behind each one. If he chooses the door with the lady behind it, he is innocent and must immediately marry her, but if he chooses the door with the tiger behind it, he is deemed guilty and is immediately devoured by the animal.

The king learns that his daughter has a lover, a handsome and brave youth who is of lower status than the princess, and has him imprisoned to await trial. By the time that day comes, the princess has used her influence to learn the positions of the lady and the tiger behind the two doors. She has also discovered that the lady is someone whom she hates, thinking her to be a rival for the affections of the accused. When he looks to the princess for help, she discreetly indicates the door on his right, which he opens.

The outcome of this choice is not revealed. Instead, the narrator departs from the story to summarize the princess's state of mind and her thoughts about directing the accused to one fate or the other, as she will lose him either to death or to marriage. She contemplates the pros and cons of each option, though notably considering the lady more. Finally, the story ends with the question, "And so I leave it with all of you: Which came out of the opened door – the lady, or the tiger?"

== Sequel ==
In July 1885, again in The Century Magazine, Stockton published "The Discourager of Hesitancy", a follow-up to "The Lady, or the Tiger?", and set one year after the events of that story. Five travelers visit the kingdom to discover what the accused man had found behind the door he chose. Meeting with an official, they explain that one of their countrymen was present on that day, but fled without seeing the result. The official tells them a second story, of a prince who had come to the kingdom to find a wife. Instead of allowing him to see any available ladies, the king had him immediately taken to guest quarters and summoned attendants to prepare him for a wedding to be held the next day. One attendant introduced himself as the Discourager of Hesitancy and explained that his job was to ensure compliance with the king's will, through the subtle threat of the large "cimeter" (scimitar) he carried.

At noon on the following day, the prince was blindfolded and brought before a priest, where a marriage ceremony was performed and he could feel and hear a lady standing next to him. Once the ceremony was complete, the blindfold was removed and he turned to find 40 ladies standing before him, one of whom was his new bride. If he did not correctly identify her, the Discourager would execute him on the spot. The prince narrowed the possibilities down to two, one lady smiling and one frowning, and made the correct choice.

The kingdom official tells the five travelers that once they figure out which lady the prince had married, he will tell them the outcome of "The Lady, or the Tiger?" The story ends with a comment that they still have not come to a decision.

== In other works ==
A play adaptation by Sydney Rosenfeld debuted at Wallack's Theatre in 1888 and ran for seven weeks. In addition to stretching out the story as long as possible to make it a play, at the end the choice was revealed to the audience: neither a lady nor a tiger, but an old hag.

A radio dramatization of "The Lady, or the Tiger" by Elliott and Cathy Lewis aired on the show On Stage in 1953.

Toyah Willcox and Robert Fripp released a recording of "The Lady, or the Tiger?" and "The Discourager of Hesitancy" with Willcox reading the stories to electric guitar accompaniment by Fripp.

"The Lady, or the Tiger?" is one of three short stories that were adapted into the 1966 musical comedy The Apple Tree.

The story served as inspiration for Raymond Smullyan's puzzle book by the same title, The Lady, or the Tiger?. The first set of logic puzzles in the book had a similar scenario to the short story in which a king gives each prisoner a choice between a number of doors; behind each one was either a lady or a tiger. However, the king bases the prisoner's fate on intelligence and not luck by posting a statement on each door that can be true or false.

The Lady, or the Tiger? was adapted into a short film by Encyclopaedia Britannica Educational Corporation in 1970.

"The Purr-fect Crime", Season 1, Episode 19 of the U.S. television series Batman ends with a cliffhanger in which Catwoman has Batman locked in a room with two doors; one of which opens to her, and the other opens to a tiger. Over an intercom she taunts him with "Which will it be, Batman? The lady or the tiger?" Batman has no hint and chooses the door that has the tiger.

The story serves as the namesake for They Might Be Giants' song "The Lady and The Tiger", though the song differs from the story considerably, instead being about a conversation between the lady and the tiger as they wait for the doors to be opened.

== See also ==
- Bayes' Theorem
- Catch-22 (logic)
- Cliffhanger
- The Crying of Lot 49
- Monty Hall problem
- Paradox
- Zeigarnik effect
