= White Knight =

A white knight is a fictional stock character representing a gallant knight.

White Knight or Whiteknight may also refer to:

== People and titles ==
- White Knight (Fitzgibbon family), a Hiberno-Norman title of nobility
- Lewis Carroll, who referred to himself as White Knight

== Art, entertainment and media ==
=== Fictional entities ===
- Knight-errant, a literary stock character portrayed as a white knight
- White Knight (Through the Looking-Glass), a character in Through the Looking Glass which resembles the chess-piece
- "Gotham's White Knight", a nickname given to Harvey Dent in The Dark Knight (2008)
- White Knight, James Bond's codename while infiltrating a terrorist military base in the beginning of Tomorrow Never Dies
- White Knight, a character in the Generator Rex cartoon series
- White Knight, a playable character class in the popular MMORPG MapleStory
- White Knight, the name of the train engine in the Tokyopop manga Snow
- The Knights of Falador, a fictional organisation in the online game RuneScape

=== Games ===
- Knight (chess), playing piece in the game of chess
- White Knight Chronicles, a video game by Level-5 for the PlayStation 3 and PlayStation 4
- A computer chess program written by Martin Bryant (programmer)

=== Film and television ===
- White Knight (film), an Indian short documentary film directed by Aarti Shrivastava
- "The White Knight" (The Legend of Zelda), an episode of The Legend of Zelda
- "White Knights" (Legends of Tomorrow), an episode of Legends of Tomorrow

=== Literature ===
- Batman: White Knight, a 2017–2018 comic book limited series written and illustrated by Sean Murphy
- White Knight, a 1999 novel by Jaclyn Reding
- White Knight, a 2018 novel by C.D. Reiss
- The White Knight (book), a 1952 biography of Lewis Carroll by Alexander L. Taylor
- The White Knight, a 2007 novel by Gilbert Morris
- The White Knight, a 2023 Ben Hope novel by Scott Mariani

=== Music ===
- "The White Knight" (song), a 1976 hit single by Cledus Maggard
- White Knight (album), by Todd Rundgren

== Vehicles ==
- Scaled Composites White Knight, the aircraft used to carry and launch Scaled Composites SpaceShipOne
  - Scaled Composites White Knight Two, the technological successor of the first
- Posnansky/Fronius PF-1 White Knight, a glider
- HMM-165, a helicopter squadron in the US Marine Corps, nicknamed White Knights

== Other uses ==
- White knight (business), a friendly investor that acquires a corporation
- White Knight (chocolate), an Australian mint-flavored chocolate bar
- The White Knight (horse), British thoroughbred racehourse foaled 1903
- White Knight (software), a terminal program for Macintosh computers
- White Knights of the Ku Klux Klan, one of the most violent and militant branches of the Ku Klux Klan
- Whiteknights Park, main campus of the University of Reading, England
- Whiteknights Yorkshire Blood Bikes, an English charity
- 17612 Whiteknight, a minor planet
- White Knight, an intelligence firm owned by Joel Zamel

== See also ==
- John Hunyadi, nicknamed the White Knight of Wallachia
- White horse (disambiguation)
- White night (disambiguation)
