= Saadia (film) =

1953 film by Albert Lewin

- Directed by: Albert Lewin
- Written by: Albert Lewin
- Based on: Échec au destin by Francis D'Autheville
- Starring: Mel Ferrer; Cornel Wilde
- Cinematography: Christopher Challis
- Edited by: Harold F. Kress
- Music by: Bronislau Kaper
- Distributed by: Metro-Goldwyn-Mayer
- Release date: December 1953
- Country: United States
- Language: English
- Budget: $1,022,000
- Box office: $1,352,000

Saadia is a 1953 adventure film directed by Albert Lewin and starring Mel Ferrer and Cornel Wilde. Set in Morocco, and based on a novel by the French writer Francis D'Autheville, it tells of a love triangle.

== Plot ==
=== Setting and premise ===
The story follows Saadia, a wild and mysterious Arab girl whose life has been shaped by a local sorceress who claims she has the “evil eye” and brings misfortune to those who love her. This belief isolates her from the community.

=== Love triangle ===
French doctor Henrik takes Saadia to his clinic for rehabilitation, where he falls in love with her. At the same time, Henrik’s friend and the reigning prince of the small Moroccan state, Si Lahssen, also becomes enamored with her, creating a tense love triangle.

=== Plague and mission ===
When a plague strikes the town, Saadia is convinced she is responsible. Determined to help, she rides alone into the mountainous region to retrieve a plague serum being held for ransom by Tuareg bandits. This journey becomes the central action of the film.

== Cast ==
- Cornel Wilde as Si Lahssen
- Mel Ferrer as Henrik
- Rita Gam as Saadia
- Michel Simon as Bou Rezza
- Cyril Cusack as Khadir
- Wanda Rotha as Fatima
- Marcel Poncin as Moha
- Anthony Marlowe as Cpt. Sabert
- Hélène Vallier as Zoubida
- Mahjoub Ben Brahim as Ahmed
- Jacques Dufilho as leader of bandits
- Bernard Farrel as Lt. Camuzac
- Richard Johnson as Lt. Girard
- Peter Copley as Mokhazenis
- Marne Maitland as horse dealer
- Harold Kasket as Sheikh of Inimert
- Peter Bull as village leader
- Eddie Leslie as a villager

== Production ==
Filmed entirely in Morocco, Saadia is believed to have been the first Technicolor feature to have been filmed on location. The cinematographer Christopher Challis called it the most difficult production he had ever worked on. Lewin had pre-selected the sets on a pre-production tour of Morocco, however, unaware of the technical requirements of the large three-strip camera rig, interiors proved to be too small. Thus, there could be no long shots. Among his other eccentricities the film maker also had a horse transported more than a thousand miles to the set, but finding the tail too short, had fake ones made abroad and sent to the filming location.

== Reception ==
According to MGM records the movie earned $580,000 in the US and Canada and $772,000 elsewhere, making a loss to the studio of $408,000.
