= Whitehorse (disambiguation) =

Whitehorse is a city in Yukon, Canada.

Whitehorse may also refer to:

- Whitehorse, Chester County, Pennsylvania, United States
- Whitehorse, South Dakota, United States
- City of Whitehorse, Victoria, Australia
- Whitehorse (electoral district), former electoral district in Yukon, Canada
- Whitehorse (band), a Canadian folk rock band
  - Whitehorse (album), 2011
- HMCS Whitehorse, a 1998 ship of the Canadian Forces
- Whitehorse, Native American actor who portrayed Geronimo in Stagecoach (1939 film)

== See also ==
- White horse (disambiguation)
