= Summer in Tyrol =

1964 film

- Directed by: Erik Balling
- Written by: Erik Balling; Peer Guldbrandsen; Hans Müller-Einigen (libretto); Erik Charell (libretto); Ralph Benatzky (libretto); Oscar Blumenthal (play); Gustav Kadelburg (play)
- Produced by: Bo Christensen; Dirch Passer; Henrik Sandberg
- Starring: Dirch Passer
- Cinematography: Jørgen Skov
- Release date: 25 September 1964
- Running time: 99 minutes
- Country: Denmark
- Language: Danish

Summer in Tyrol (Danish: Sommer i Tyrol) is a 1964 Danish comedy film directed by Erik Balling and stars Dirch Passer, among others. The film is based on the Austrian operetta The White Horse Inn.

== Cast ==
- Dirch Passer as Leopold Ulrik Joackim Brantmeyer
- Susse Wold as Josepha Gabriela Maria Vogelhuber
- Ove Sprogøe as Sigismund Sülzheimer
- Karl Stegger as Julius Müller
- Lone Hertz as Klara Müller
- Peter Malberg as Kaiser Franz Joseph
- Jan Priiskorn-Schmidt as Young Waiter
- Gyda Hansen as Lena
- Paul Hagen as Photographer Schmidt
- Elith Foss as The Mayor
- Ole Monty as The Travel Guide
- Jytte Abildstrøm as Guest at inn
- Agnes Rehni as Guest at inn
- Bjørn Spiro as Guest with moustache
- Gunnar Bigum as Man answering the phone
