= Wanda Rotha =

Austrian actress

- Born: 12 March 1901; Vienna, Austro-Hungarian Empire
- Died: 5 August 1982 (aged 81); London, United Kingdom
- Other name: Wanda Rotter
- Occupation: Actor
- Years active: 1931-1967 (film & TV)

Wanda Rotha (1901–1982) was an Austrian stage actress. She also appeared in some films and television series.

== Selected filmography ==
- Mrs. Fitzherbert (1947)
- Saadia (1953)
- The Mad Bomberg (1957)
- Hamlet (1961)
- The Magnificent Showman (1964)

== Bibliography ==
- Goble, Alan. The Complete Index to Literary Sources in Film. Walter de Gruyter, 1999.
