= Das Kabinett des Dr. Larifari =

1930 film

- Directed by: Robert Wohlmuth
- Written by: Max Hansen; Paul Morgan
- Starring: Max Hansen; Paul Morgan; Carl Jöken
- Cinematography: Otto Heller; Eduard Hoesch
- Music by: Max Hansen; Robert Stolz; Franz Waxman
- Production companies: Trio-Film; Tobis Film
- Distributed by: Terra Film
- Release date: 1 August 1930
- Running time: 78 minutes
- Country: Germany
- Language: German (Synchronized sound)

Das Kabinett des Dr. Larifari ("The Cabinet of Dr. Larifari") is a 1930 German comedy film directed by Robert Wohlmuth and starring Max Hansen, Paul Morgan and Carl Jöken. The film is a parody of the German Film industry of the era. Its title is a reference to the 1919 expressionist film The Cabinet of Dr. Caligari.

It's also one of the earliest known German talkie film after Melody of the Heart (released some in the late 1920s) and also to spoof someone films of the 1920s silent german film to do so on and also considered it with some little of musical film.

== Cast ==
- Max Hansen as Max Hansen / Pepperl Kröninger
- Paul Morgan as Paul Morgan / Sebaldus Kröninger / Ehemann (husband)
- Carl Jöken as Kammersänger Carl Jöken / Gesangspädagoge (singing instructor)
- Marianne Stanior as Sekretärin der Trio-Film (secretary of Trio film)
- Gisela Werbisek as Hedda Mutz-Kahla, Schriftstellerin (author)
- Alice Hechy as Ehefrau (wife)
- Else Reval as Sängerin (vocalist)
- Ellen Plessow
- Willy Prager as Patient (patient)
- Karl Harbacher as Leopold, Kellner (waiter)
- Wolfgang von Schwindt as Arzt (doctor)
- Henry Berg
- Gerhard Dammann as Gast / Schwiegervater (guest / father-in-law)
- Gyula Szőreghy
- Erik Ode as Wolfgang Anglert, Chefredakteur (editor-in-chief)
- Die Weintraub Syncopators as Orchester (orchestra)
- Ida Krill as Das Dienstmädchen (the handmaiden)

== Bibliography ==
- Bock, Hans-Michael & Bergfelder, Tim. The Concise CineGraph. Encyclopedia of German Cinema. Berghahn Books, 2009.
