= Marianne Stanior =

German actress

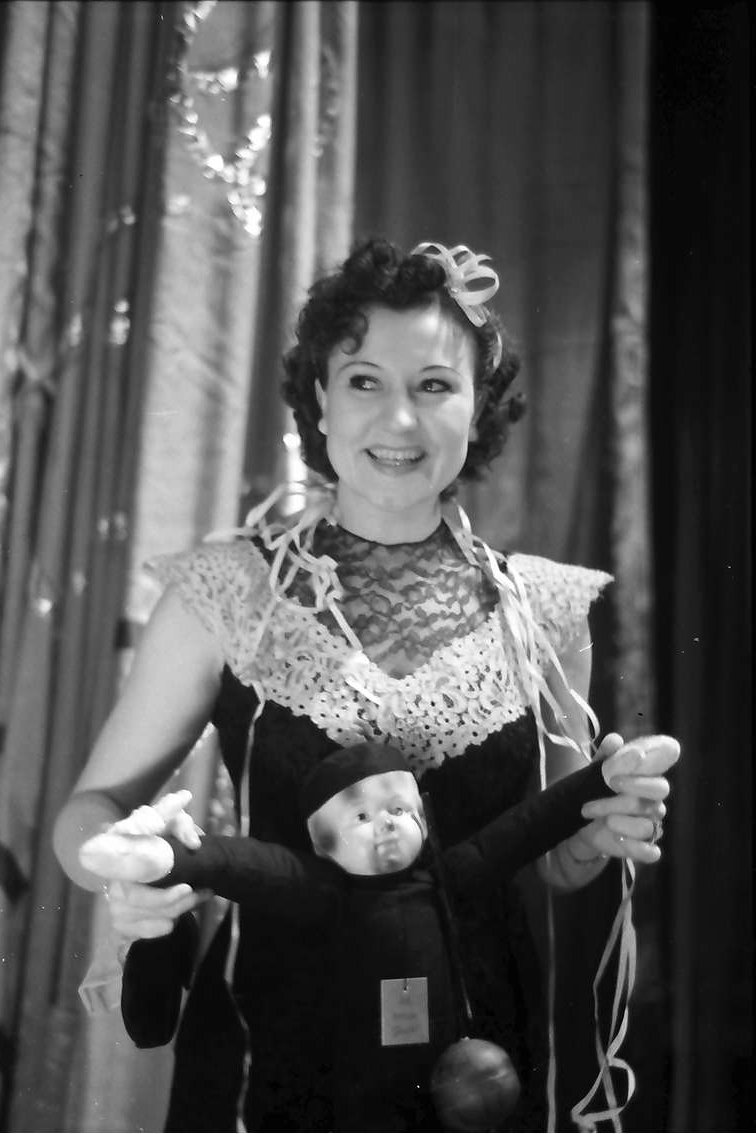
- Marianne Stanior in 1938
- Born: 19 June 1910; German Empire
- Died: 12 January 1967 (aged 56); Munich, Bavaria, West Germany
- Occupation: Actress
- Years active: 1921–1954 (film)

Marianne Stanior (1910–1967) was a German stage and film actress.

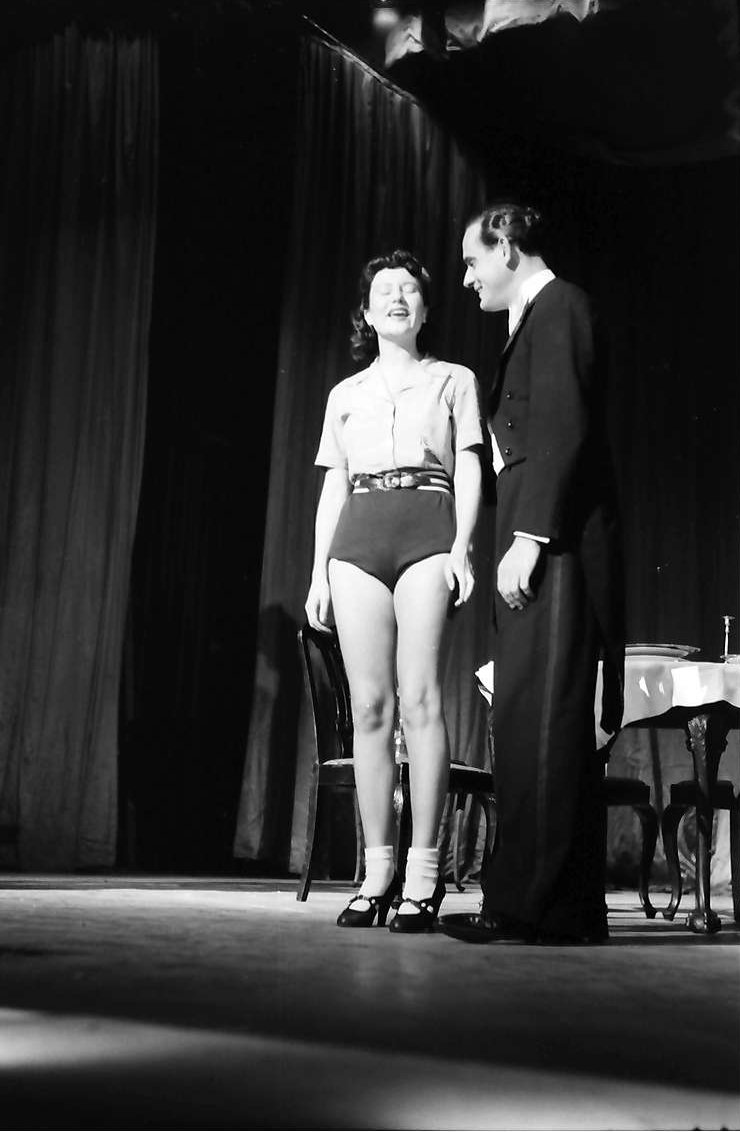
With Curt Ackermann in 1938.

== Selected filmography ==
- Night of Mystery (1927)
- The Cabinet of Doctor Larifari (1930)
- The White Horse Inn (1935)
- The Irresistible Man (1937)
- Hurrah! I'm a Father (1939)
- Riding for Germany (1941)
- Goodbye, Franziska (1941)

== Bibliography ==
- Giesen, Rolf. Nazi Propaganda Films: A History and Filmography. McFarland & Co, 2003.
