= White Horse Inn (1948 film) =

- Directed by: Benito Perojo
- Written by: Juan Carlos Muello; Hans Müller-Einigen (libretto); Erik Charell (libretto); Ralph Benatzky (libretto); Oscar Blumenthal (play); Gustav Kadelburg (play)
- Produced by: Emelco
- Starring: Elisa Christian Galvé; Juan Carlos Thorry; Tilda Thamar; Héctor Calcaño; Osvaldo Miranda
- Music by: Ralph Benatzky
- Release date: 15 April 1948
- Running time: 72 minutes
- Country: Argentina
- Language: Spanish

White Horse Inn (Spanish: La hostería del caballito blanco) is a 1948 Argentine musical comedy film of the classical era of Argentine cinema, directed by Benito Perojo and written by Juan Carlos Muello based upon the homonymous operetta The White Horse Inn by Ralph Benatzky and Robert Stolz. It was premiered on April 15, 1948.

The plot is about a famous singer who falls in love with the owner of an inn.

== Cast ==
- Alfredo Alaria
- María Aurelia Bisutti
- Héctor Calcaño
- Susana Canales
- Max Citelli
- Tito Climent
- María Ferez
- Elisa Galvé
- Hedy Krilla
- Mecha López
- Nelly Meden
- Osvaldo Miranda
- Hilda Muller
- Raimundo Pastore
- Héctor Quintanilla
- Santiago Rebull
- Tilda Thamar
- Juan Carlos Thorry
