= The White Horse Inn (1935 film) =

1935 film directed by Carl Lamac

- Directed by: Carl Lamac
- Written by: Hans Müller-Einigen (libretto); Erik Charell (libretto); Ralph Benatzky (libretto); Oscar Blumenthal (play); Gustav Kadelburg (play)
- Starring: Christl Mardayn; Hermann Thimig
- Release date: 6 December 1935
- Running time: 1h 30min
- Country: Austria
- Language: Germany

The White Horse Inn (German: Im weißen Rößl) is a 1935 German musical film based on the musical comedy by Ralph Benatzky and Robert Stolz.

== Cast ==
- Christl Mardayn – Josepha Voglhuber, Wirtin vom Gasthof 'Zum weißen Rößl'
- Hermann Thimig – Leopold, Oberkellner
- Willi Schaeffers – Giesecke, Trikotagenfabrikant
- Annie Markart – Ottilie, seine Tochter
- Theo Lingen – Kommerzienrat Fürst
- Fritz Odemar – Dr. Siedler, Lawyer
- Marianne Stanior – Klärchen
- Hanns Obonya – Gustl, Pikkolo
- Joseph Egger
- Fritz Imhoff – Bürgermeister
- Eduard Loibner
- Karl Ehmann
