= Anthony Marlowe (tenor) =

Albert Mahler, also known by the performance name Anthony Marlowe, (5 February 1905 – 29 June 1962) was an American tenor, actor, and choral conductor. He began his performance career with the Philadelphia Civic Opera Company in 1924, and sang with that company as a principal artist for five seasons before being formally trained at the Curtis Institute of Music from 1929 to 1933. He was primarily active as an opera singer in Philadelphia and Cincinnati in his early career during which time he performed under his birth name. As Mahler he performed on Broadway as the Cook's Guide and Serenader in the operetta White Horse Inn at the Center Theatre in 1936-1937.

In 1938 Mahler adopted the performance name Anthony Marlowe when he began working as an actor in Hollywood films. He appeared in five movies released between 1938 and 1943; most often appearing in small featured roles as a singer. He made one last film a decade later; appearing as Captain Sabert in Saadia (1953). As Marlowe he sang two seasons with the Chicago City Opera Company prior to joining the Metropolitan Opera ("The Met") in 1939. He gave more than 200 performances with the Met over the next decade. He also performed as a guest at opera houses in Europe and South America; notably portraying Red Whiskers in the world premiere of Benjamin Britten's Billy Budd at the Royal Opera House in 1951. After retiring from the stage he taught on the music faculty at Mercy College of Detroit where he was a choral conductor.

== Early life and work with the Philadelphia Civic Opera Company ==
The son of Max and Kate Mahler, Albert Mahler was born on 5 February 1905 in Philadelphia, Pennsylvania. The financial situation of his family worsened while he was young, and he began working as a newspaper boy at the age of 8. He continued to work a series of jobs in his growing up years including work as a golf caddy and as longshoreman and stevedore on the waterfront in Philadelphia. In his youth he was active as a boxer in his native city; fighting in the welterweight class. After graduating from South Philadelphia High School he attended Temple University where he studied medicine.

Mahler was an original member of the Philadelphia Civic Opera Company (PCOC) when it was founded in 1924. He began singing with the company as a member of the chorus, and was trained by the company as an opera singer. He stepped out of the chorus to made his professional opera role debut with the PCOC on December 11, 1924 at the Philadelphia's Metropolitan Opera House (PMOH); appearing as Beppe in Pagliacci with Anna Fitziu as Nedda and Alexander Smallens leading members of the Philadelphia Orchestra.

Mahler subsequently appeared with the PCPC as Remendado in Carmen (1925 & 1926, with Julia Claussen in the title role), the messenger in Il trovatore (1925), Walther in Tannhäuser (1926, with Paul Althouse in the title role), Goro in Madama Butterfly (1926), and Tybalt in Roméo et Juliette (1926). In December 1926 he performed the role of Tom Tom in Victor Herbert's Babes in Toyland with the Matinee Music Club at PMOH. In January 1927 he sang Remendado once again with PCOC; this time with Frances Peralta as Carmen.

In the summer of 1927 Mahler was committed to the Cincinnati Opera for eight weeks of performances; performing 12 different parts across more than 40 performances. Later that year he appeared with the PCOC as Damon in La Reine de Mai; an opera that was at that time attributed to Gluck. Other PCOC performances included appearances as Flaminio L'amore dei tre re (1928), the Philistine Messenger in Samson and Delilah (1928), David in Die Meistersinger von Nürnberg (1928), Edmondo and the Dance Master in Manon Lescaut (1928), Martin in Leroux's Le Chemineau (1929), Spoletta in Tosca (1929), Basilio in The Marriage of Figaro (1929), and the title role in Debussy's L'enfant prodigue (1929). On November 1, 1928 he performed the role of Brighella in the United States premiere of Ariadne auf Naxos with PCOC.

== Curtis Institute of Music and other early performances ==
In 1929 Mahler was awarded a full scholarship to the Curtis Institute of Music (CIM). In May 1929 he portrayed Pedro in a student production of Tiefland given by the CIM under conductor Artur Rodziński at Philadelphia Academy of Music (AM). At CIM he studied voice with Horatio Connell and Emilio de Gogorza. He graduated from CIM in 1933 with a Bachelor of Music degree in voice. While a student at Curtis, he was a performer with the Philadelphia Grand Opera Company (PGOC), and also returned frequently to the Cincinnati Opera for their summer seasons.

In October 1929 he sang Remendado to Sophie Braslau's Carmen for his debut with the PGOC at AM under the baton of Emil Młynarski. He sang the roles of Andrey Shchelkalov, Misail, Boyar, the Simpleton, and Chernikovsky in a concert version of Boris Godunov with the Philadelphia Orchestra at AM in multiple performances during the final months of 1929. He later repeated excerpts from this opera in concert with the Mendelssohn Club and the Philadelphia Orchestra in 1930.

Other roles Mahler performed with the PGOC at the AM included Goro to Eleanor Painter's Butterfly (1929), Beppo in Pagliacci (1929 & 1932), Matteo Borsa in Rigoletto (1930), Pedro in Tiefland (1930), Gastone de Letorières in La traviata (1930), the messenger in Aida (1930), the poet monk in Le jongleur de Notre-Dame (1930, with Mary Garden), Lord Arturo Bucklaw in Lucia di Lammermoor (1930, with Josephine Lucchese), Goro to Hizi Koyke's Butterfly (1931), Torquemada in L'heure espagnole (1931 & 1932), the Idiot in Wozzeck (1931), Dancaïre in Carmen (1931 & 1932), Walther in Tannhäuser (1931), Spoletta to Bianca Saroya's Tosca (1932), and Nicias in Thaïs (1932).

After graduating from CIM, Mahler performed in operas at the Robin Hood Dell; including performances as Gastone in La traviata (1933), Borsa in Rigoletto (1933), Spoletta in Tosca (1934), Cochenille, Frantz, and Pittichinaccio in The Tales of Hoffmann (1934), and Beppe in Pagliacci (1935, with conductor Sylvan Levin). In the autumn of 1933 he began performing in Yiddish plays with a stock theatre company in residence at the Arch Street Theatre. He was still with this company the following year when he starred in the Yiddish operettas The Jolly Cobbler and The Jewish Dream. In October 1934 he performed the role of the Shepherd in Tristan und Isolde with the Philadelphia Orchestra at the AM. He sang in operas again with the orchestra the following year; including the parts of Bardolfo in Falstaff and Don Curzio in The Marriage of Figaro under Fritz Reiner.

In 1936-1937 Mahler performed on Broadway as the Cook's Guide and Serenader in White Horse Inn at the Center Theatre where it ran for 223 performances.

== Career as Anthony Marlowe ==
Mahler changed his performance name to Anthony Marlowe when he became a film actor, and then continued to use that name as an opera singer. He was a feature but uncredited singer in the musical film The Great Waltz (1938, Metro-Goldwyn-Mayer). He was credited as an on-screen singer in The Great Commandment (1939, 20th Century Fox), and also portrayed opera singers in the films The Flame of New Orleans (1941) and Phantom of the Opera (1943, Universal Pictures). He portrayed Carl Muller in Is Everybody Happy? (1943, Columbia Pictures), and after a long absence from the screen returned as Captain Sabert in Saadia (1953, Metro-Goldwyn-Mayer).

In 1938 Marlowe made his debut as David in Die Meistersinger von Nürnberg with the Chicago City Opera Company (CCOC). He remained with the company for two season; leaving when he signed a contract with the Metropolitan Opera "the Met". He made his debut with the Met on tour to Philadelphia on December 26, 1939 as the Sailor's Voice in Tristan und Isolde with Lauritz Melchior as Tristan and Kirsten Flagstad as Isolde; a role he repeated at the Metropolitan Opera House on New Year's Day 1940.

Marlowe left the Met at the end of the 1939-1940 season; but later returned to sing with the company from 1945 to 1949. In the intervening period he sang with both the CCOC and the San Francisco Opera in 1941, and starred as Peter in the Los Angeles and Chicago productions of the operetta The Waltz King in 1943.

Marlowe worked primarily as a comprimario singer at the Met; performing a total of 40 small parts. On January 11, 1947 he portrayed a Philistine Lord in the world premiere of Bernard Rogers and Norman Corwin's The Warrior. Some of his other roles at the Met included Normanno in Lucia di Lammermoor, Parpignol La bohème, Rodrigo in Otello, Ruiz in Il trovatore, Spoletta in Tosca, and the Steersman in Der fliegende Holländer. His final and 224th performance with the Met was on tour to the Boston Opera House on March 31, 1949 where he performed the lawyer in Britten's Peter Grimes.

While only playing minor parts in New York, Marlowe was a leading tenor as a guest artist at the Royal Opera House (ROH) in London; making his debut there in 1950 as the Duke of Mantua in Rigoletto as a replacement for another singer. He sang other leading roles at the ROH during the 1950s including Red Whiskers in the 1951 world premiere of Britten Billy Budd and Mario Cavaradossi in Tosca. Other roles he performed in London included the Italian singer in Der Rosenkavalier, Manrico in Il trovatore, Monostatos in The Magic Flute, and Radames in Aida. He also appeared in operas at the Teatro Colón in Buenos Aires, the Theatro Municipal in Rio de Janeiro, and the Teatro dell'Opera di Roma.

== Later life ==
Mahler was married to Corrine Lehmann Mahler. He joined the music faculty of Mercy College of Detroit in 1955 where he worked as a choral director until he died. He made several guest appearances with the Detroit Symphony Orchestra.

Mahler died from hepatitis in Detroit, Michigan on 29 June 1962.
