= The White Horse, Potters Bar =

Pub in Hertfordshire, England

Coordinates: 51°41′35″N 0°10′41″W

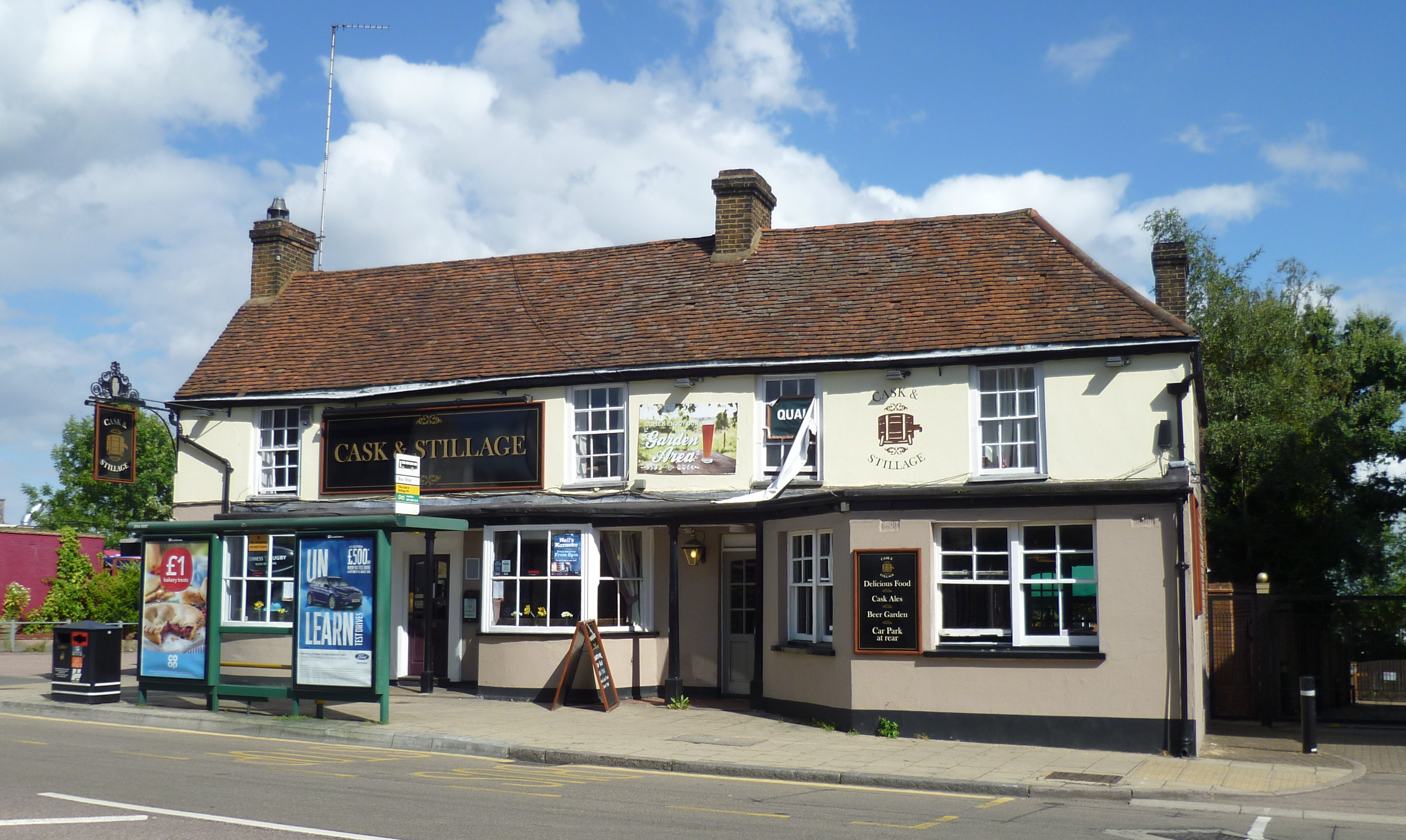
The Cask & Stillage

The White Horse, now known as The Cask and Stillage, is a public house in High Street, Potters Bar, England, and a grade II listed building with Historic England.
