= Max Hansen (tenor) =

German opera singer

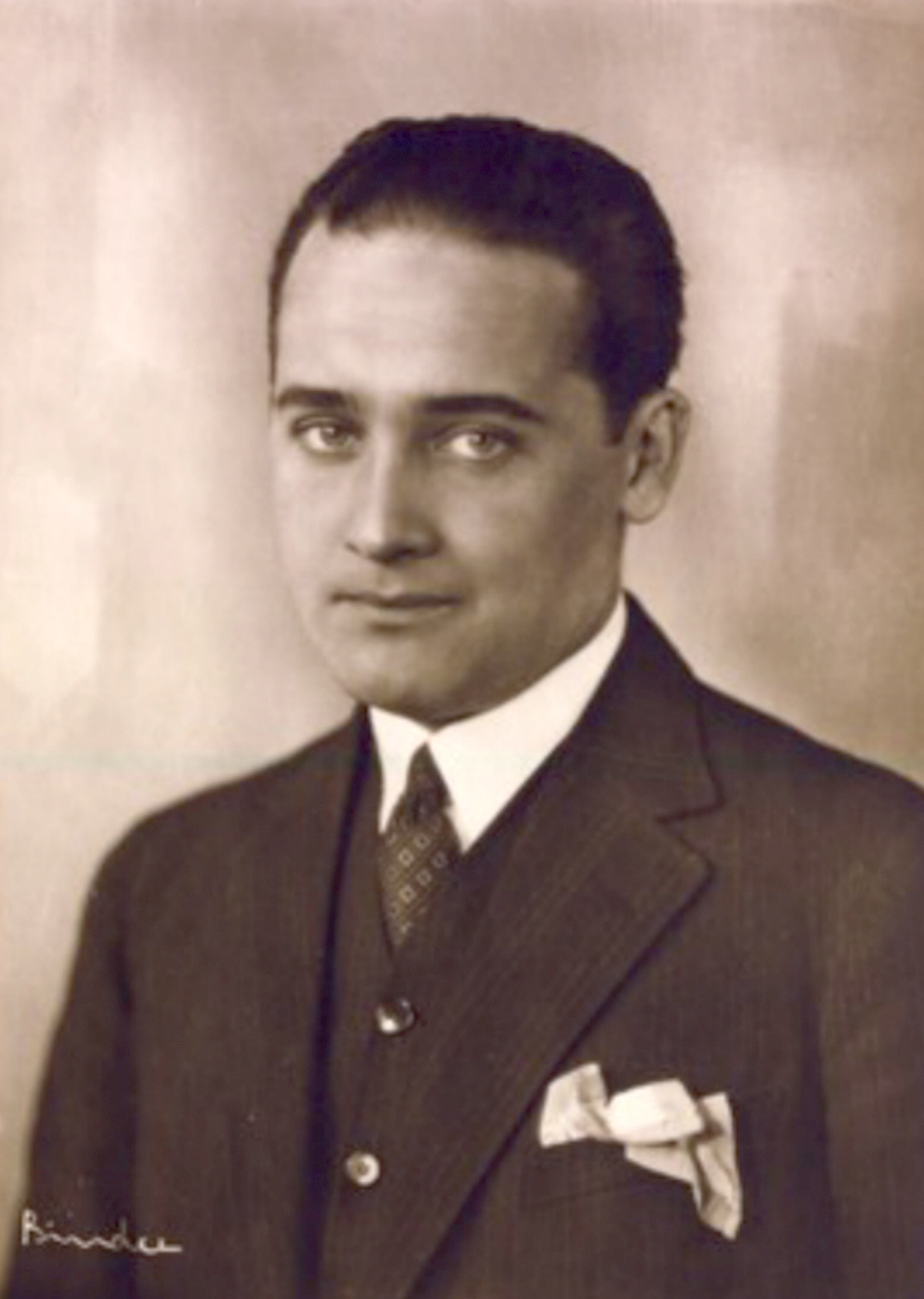
- Max Hansen in 1929
- Born: Max Josef Haller; 22 December 1897; Mannheim, Imperial Germany
- Died: 12 November 1961 (aged 63)
- Other names: The Little Caruso
- Occupations: Singer, cabaret artist, actor, comedian
- Spouse(s): Lizzi Waldmüller (div.), Britta Hansen
- Children: 4

Max Hansen (22 December 1897 – 12 November 1961), also known as 'The Little Caruso', was a Danish singer, cabaret artist, actor, and comedian.

== Biography ==
Hansen was born Max Josef Haller in Mannheim, Imperial Germany as an illegitimate child to the Danish actress Eva Haller and a Jewish father, by other sources a Swedish Officer Schürer von Waldheim. He grew up with foster-parents in Munich, where he first appeared at the Cabaret Simplizissimus at the age of 17. In 1914 he moved to Vienna and appeared in several smaller theatres as a singer and comedian.

In 1924, Hansen created the tenor role of Baron Kolomán Zsupán in Gräfin Mariza at Hubert Marischka's Theater an der Wien in Vienna. This production moved to the Metropoltheater in Berlin after 900 performances. In Berlin he founded the Kabarett der Komiker with Paul Morgan and Kurt Robitschek. Hansen was engaged by Max Reinhardt for his revival of Offenbach's La belle Hélène and by Erik Charell for his production of Lehar's The Merry Widow. Hansen's greatest stage success was in creating the role of Leopold the waiter in Ralph Benatzky's operetta-musical The White Horse Inn, a part he also undertook in Richard Oswald's 1926 silent movie.

In 1932, Hansen satirised Adolf Hitler as a homosexual with his song "War'n Sie schon mal in mich verliebt?" ("Have you ever been in love with me?"), which caused the bitter hate of the Nazis. In contrast, he also parodied the opera and operetta soprano Gitta Alpár (in drag) in a film recording dating from the same year. He returned to Vienna in 1933 and worked again at the Theater an der Wien. In 1936 he met Zarah Leander on a Scandinavian tour and engaged her as his stage partner at Vienna. After the Anschluss that brought Austria to the German Reich in 1938, Hansen emigrated to Denmark, where he founded his own theater at Copenhagen. Richard Tauber had written an operetta 'Franz im Glück' for him, which was due to be performed at the Theater an der Wien in the 1938/39 season; but the Anschluss in March 1938 put an end to that.

In 1951 he returned to Germany and was successful once again singing the role of Leopold the waiter (The White Horse Inn) in Hamburg and at Berlin's Theater am Nollendorfplatz. In 1953 Hansen moved back to Copenhagen, where he died in 1961.

Hansen was married to Austrian actress Lizzi Waldmüller and after 1939 to Britta Hansen. He had four children. His daughter Ann-Mari Max Hansen, born in 1949, and his son Max Hansen Jr., born in 1954, are both actors.

In 2004 the German director Douglas Wolfsperger portrayed Hansen in his documentary "War'n Sie schon mal in mich verliebt?"

== Filmography ==
- Hussar Fever (1925)
- The Schimeck Family (1926)
- The White Horse Inn (1926)
- Der lachende Ehemann (1926)
- When I Came Back (1926)
- The Little Variety Star (1926)
- His Late Excellency (1927)
- Venus im Frack (1927)
- Frau Sorge (1927)
- Fair Game (1928)
- Das Girl von der Revue (1928)
- Wir haben uns gut verstanden (1929)
- Jetzt geht's der Dolly gut (1929)
- Gaukler (Les Saltimbanques) (1930)
- Vienna, City of Song (1930)
- Terra-Melophon-Magazin Nr. 1 (1930)
- The Jumping Jack (1930)
- The Cabinet of Doctor Larifari (1930)
- Schubert's Dream of Spring (1931)
- Who Takes Love Seriously? (1931)
- The Ladies Diplomat (1932)
- This One or None (1932)
- For Once I'd Like to Have No Troubles (1932)
- Das häßliche Mädchen (1933)
- Bon Voyage (1933)
- Ihre tollste Nacht (Csardas) (1935)
- Provinsen kalder (1935)
- Shipwrecked Max (1936)
- Rosor varje kräll (1939)
- Tror du jeg er født i går? (1941)
- Wienerbarnet (1941)
- A Girl for Me (1943)
- The Green Lift (1944)
- Tired Theodore (1945)
- En förtjusande fröken (1946)
- Between Brothers (1946)
- Wedding Night (1947)
- Ingen väg tillbaka (1947)
- Sköna Helena (Menelaus) (1951)
- Hvad vil De ha'? (1956)

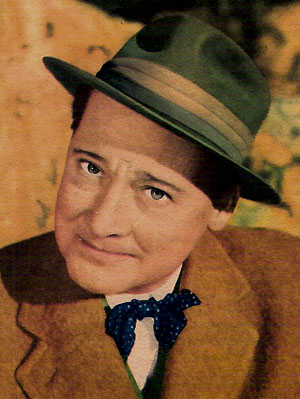
