= The White Horse, Hertford =

Pub in Hertford, Hertfordshire, England

Coordinates: 51°47′40″N 0°04′48″W

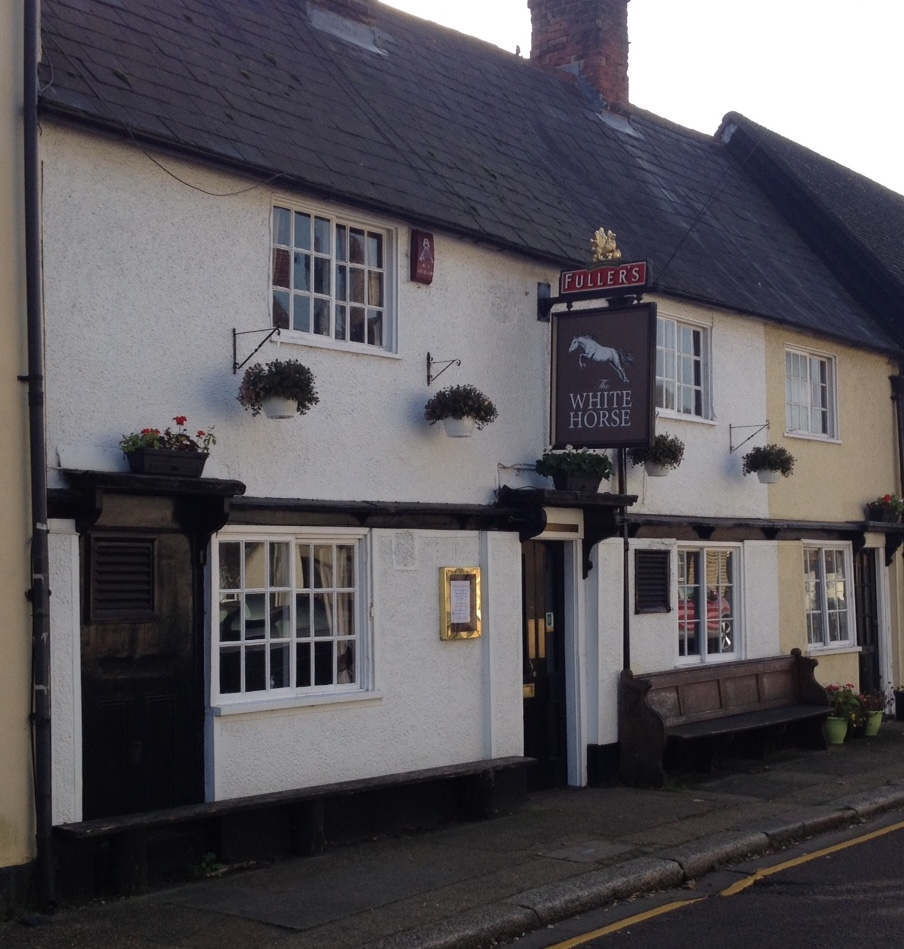

The White Horse is a public house on the south side of Castle Street, Hertford, England.

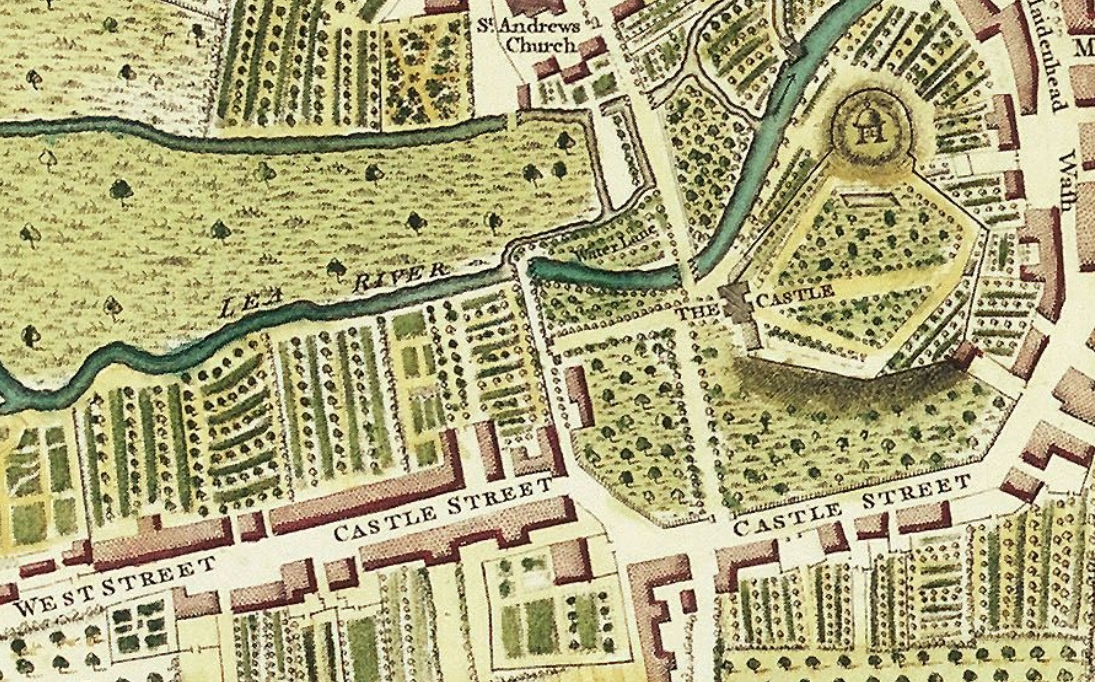
Castle Street on a 1766 map of Hartford (sic) by J. Andrews and M. Wren.

The pub occupies numbers 31 and 33 Castle Street, two of a group of three grade II listed houses that also includes number 35. The timber-framed buildings date from the sixteenth and seventeenth centuries with later additions.

The pub is under the management of Fullers Brewery.
