= Herrmann Julius Meyer =

German publisher (1826–1909)

Herrmann Julius Meyer (April 4, 1826 – March 12, 1909) was a German publisher born in Gotha. He was the son of publisher Joseph Meyer (1796-1856).

After his father's death in 1856, Herrmann Meyer took charge of the Bibliographisches Institut, a publishing firm in Hildburghausen. In 1874 he moved the headquarters to Leipzig, and in 1884 handed over the business to his sons, Arndt (1859-1920) and Hans (1858-1929), the latter renowned for his ascent of Mount Kilimanjaro.

In 1888 he established Stiftung zur Erbauung billiger Wohnungen, an association for the construction of inexpensive housing for working-class people in Leipzig. In 1900 the project had achieved foundation status, and by 1914 there were four "residential colonies" with a total of around 2700 homes in the districts of Lindenau, Eutritzsch, Reudnitz and Kleinzschocher.
