= Gustav Kadelburg =

Hungarian-German actor and writer

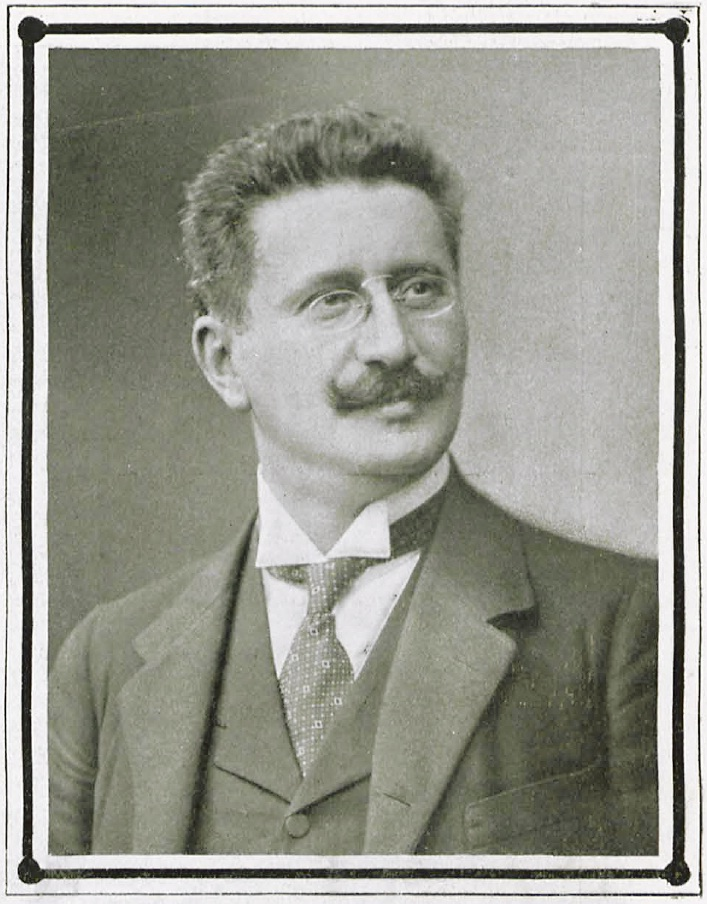
Gustav Kadelburg, 1904

Gustav Kadelburg (26 January 1851, in Pest – 11 September 1925, in Berlin) was a Hungarian-German actor and dramatist. He co-authored the hit 1897 play The White Horse Inn with Oscar Blumenthal which enjoyed popularity in both Europe and the United States during the late 19th and early 20th centuries; including an 1899 Broadway production. The play has been adapted multiple times; including films and a highly successful 1930 operetta.

== Biography ==
Kadelburg was born into a Jewish family from Budapest, his parents were Moritz Kadelburg and Johanna née Hasenfeld. He had a younger sister, a younger brother and several half–siblings from the first marriage of his father. In the 1860s or 1870s the family moved to Vienna. He became an actor against the will of his father, just like his brother Heinrich (1856–1910). His acting teacher was Alexander Strakosch. He debuted in Halle an der Saale and made his first appearance at Leipzig in 1869. Two years later he performed at the Wallnertheater in Berlin. From 1878 to 1880 he was engaged at the Vienna Stadttheater, where he played Bonvivant roles. Thereafter he moved to Berlin. From 1884 on he was performing at Deutsches Theater in Berlin. In 1889 he could be seen as Ingenieur Hoffmann in the world premiere of Gerhart Hauptmann's drama Vor Sonnenaufgang at the Lessing Theater in Berlin. He was also very successful in comedy parts, but abandoned the stage in 1894 to write comedies and farces.

=== As a playwright ===
Kadelburg became one of the most prolific and successful dramatists in German language at the turn of the century, often partnering with colleagues such as Franz von Schönthan (1849–1913), the co-author (with his brother) of the highly successful German comedy Der Raub der Sabinerinnen. A long-lasting partnership existed with Oscar Blumenthal, a former theatre critic, later director of the Lessing Theater. His plays were seen all over Germany, in the Habsburg monarchy and abroad. Many of them were translated into other languages such as English and Hungarian. In 1908, The Manchester Guardian reviewed Der Weg zur Hölle ("The Road to Hell"), his farce over three acts, then playing at the Midland Theatre. While chiding the lack of originality, the reviewer praised the pace - neither too quick to exhaust nor too slow to see the chinks.

Following the example of Wiener Blut, a potpourri of late Joseph Lanner's most famous melodies was put together and brought to the stage in 1911 as an operetta, called Alt-Wien. Kadelburg was involved in the textbook, but the work did not achieve a lasting success. In 1912 he created the plot for a musical comedy by Jean Gilbert, who later-on had to go into exile. Victor Hollaender (1866–1940) wrote the score for Blumenthal's and Kadelburg's play Hans Huckebein which premiered with the new title Die Schöne vom Strande in 1915. Also Hollaender was later-on forced to emigrate.

He was married to Julie née Strelow. He was buried at Stahnsdorf South-Western Cemetery.

During his lifetime Gustav Kadelburg became a well respected dramatist and a wealthy man — due to the royalties from his long running plays. His play Familie Schimek was adapted into a film three times, 1926 by Alfred Halm, 1935 by E. W. Emo and 1957 by Georg Jacoby. Three more of his plots were transponed into silent movies, amongst them The White Horse Inn. This play, written together with Oscar Blumenthal, premiered in Berlin in 1897. It rapidly became a hit both in Europe and the United States; including a successful 1899 production on Broadway. It was tremendously popular during the early decades of the 20th century.

=== Legacy ===
Kadelburg died in 1925. Five years after his death, the play The White Horse was transformed into an operetta, also called The White Horse Inn, with music from Ralph Benatzky, Robert Gilbert, Bruno Granichstaedten and Robert Stolz. It was produced by Erik Charell in 1930 at Berlin's Großes Schauspielhaus, a prominent cast led the premiere to a stunning and long lasting success worldwide. The operetta was presented in London, Paris, New York and many other cities. The West End production achieved 631 performances, placing it third among all operettas ever performed there. In Switzerland, 347 performances were counted in the first three seasons alone and on Broadway it ranked on the 9th place with 238 performances. Also the upcoming sound movies (since the late 1920s) were favourable for Kadelburg's plays, since the witty dialogues and the subtle portrayal of his characters came into effect. The wave of successes of Kadelburg's plays ended abruptly in 1933 in Germany (after the Nazis came to power) and in 1939 everywhere else (when they caused WW2).

Apart from The White Horse Inn, the reception never recovered.

== Literary works ==
His best-known plays (some written in conjunction with Franz von Schönthan, Oscar Blumenthal or other colleagues) are:

=== Sole authorship ===
- Voltaire wird verbrannt (1876, German adaption of Brûlons Voltaire ! by Eugène Marin Labiche and Louis Leroy)
- Der wilde Baron (1880)
- In Zivil (1892)
- Das Bärenfell (1899)
- Das schwache Geschlecht (1900)
- Das Pulverfass (1900)
- Der neue Vormund (1901)
- Familie Schierke (1902; later version Familie Schimek, 1915)
- Der Familientag (1904)
- Der Weg zur Hölle (1905; produced in English by William Collier as The Girl He Couldn't Leave Behind Him)
- Der Reisebegleiter (1917)

=== Co-author together with Franz von Schönthan ===
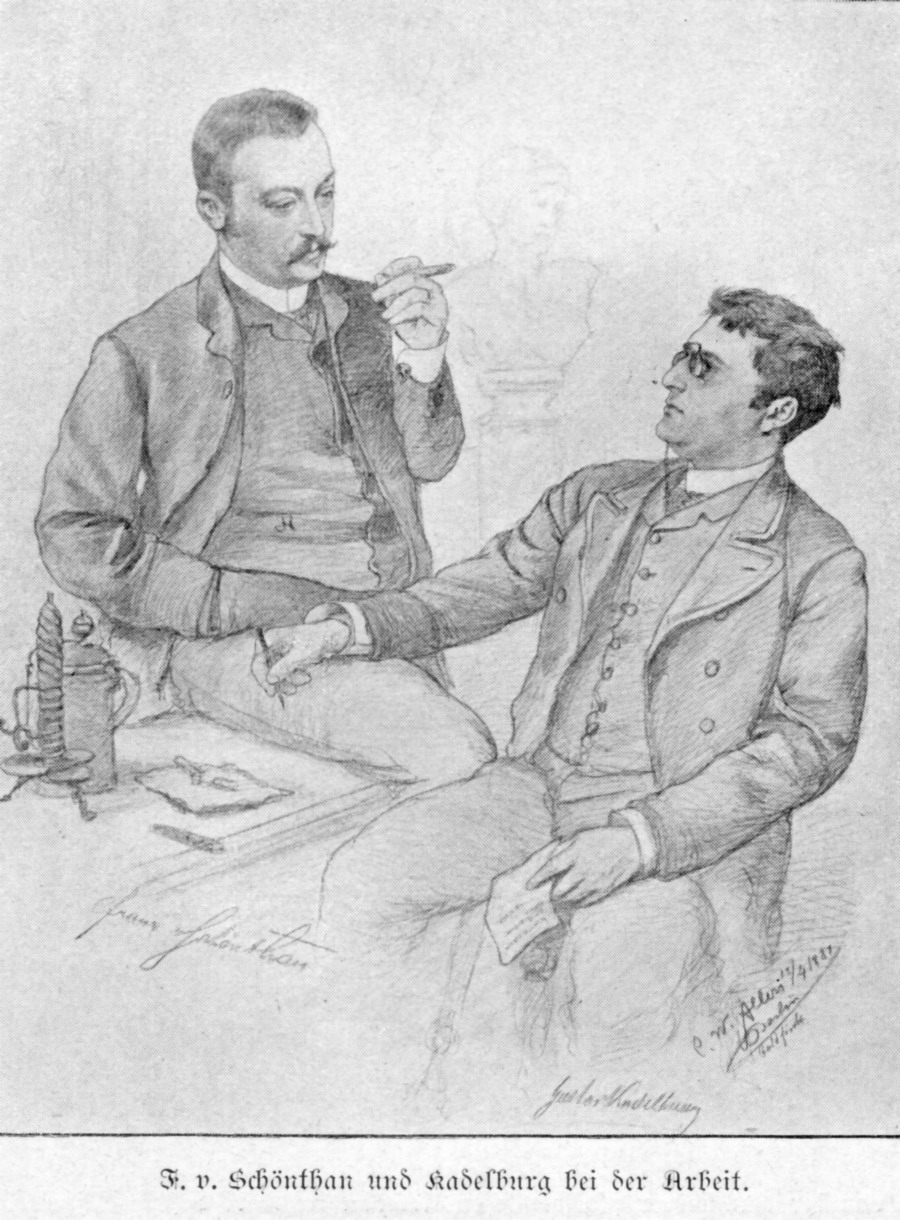
Schönthan (left), Kadelburg (right)

- Goldfische (1886) (produced in English by Augustin Daly as The Railroad of Love)
- Die berühmte Frau (1888) (produced in English by Augustin Daly as The Great Unknown)
- Zwei glückliche Tage (1892)
- Der Herr Senator (1894)
- Zum wohltätigen Zweck (1895)

=== Co-author together with Oscar Blumenthal ===
- Die Großstadtluft (1891) (produced in English by Augustin Daly as A Test Case: Or, Grass Versus Granite; modern title: A Marriage Contract)
- Die Orientreise (1892) (produced in English by Augustin Daly as The Orient Express, translated by F. C. Burnand)
- Mauerblümchen (1893)
- Zwei Wappen (1894) (adapted in English in the US as The Two Escutcheons by Sydney Rosenfeld)
- Hans Huckebein (1897) (English adaption: Number 9 – The Lady of Ostend, by F. C. Burnand)
- The White Horse Inn (1897) (First English adaption: At the White Horse Tavern, by Sydney Rosenfeld)
- Auf der Sonnenseite (1898)
- Als ich wiederkam (1899, sequel to The White Horse Inn) (English adaption: Twelve Months Later)
- Die strengen Herren (1900)
- Das Theaterdorf (1902)
- Der blinde Passagier (1902)
- Der letzte Funke (1906)
- Die Tür ins Freie (1908; English adaptation: Is Matrimony a Failure? by Leo Ditrichstein)
- Die Schöne vom Strand (1915; musical version of Hans Huckebein, music by Victor Hollaender)

=== Further collaborations ===
- Migräne (with Heinrich Wilken, 1876)
- Husarenfieber (with Richard Skowronnek, 1906)
- Der dunkle Punkt (with Rudolf Presber, 1909)
- Alt-Wien (with Julius Wilhelm and Michail Alexandrowitsch Weikone, 1911, operetta with music by Joseph Lanner)
- So bummeln wir (1912, musical comedy by Jean Gilbert)
- Im grünen Rock (with Richard Skowronnek, 1913)

== Filmography ==
- Is Matrimony a Failure?, directed by James Cruze (1922, based on the play Die Tür ins Freie)
- Hussar Fever, directed by Georg Jacoby (1925, based on the play Husarenfieber)
- The Schimeck Family, directed by Georg Jacoby (1926, based on the play Familie Schimek)
- The White Horse Inn, directed by Richard Oswald (1926, based on the play The White Horse Inn)
- When I Came Back, directed by Richard Oswald (1926, based on the play Als ich wiederkam)
- Fabulous Lola, directed by Richard Eichberg (1927, based on the play Der Weg zur Hölle)
- Zwei glückliche Tage, directed by Rudolf Walther-Fein (1932, based on the play Zwei glückliche Tage)
- The White Horse Inn, directed by Karel Lamač (1935, based on the operetta The White Horse Inn)
- White Horse Inn, directed by Benito Perojo (Argentina, 1948, based on the operetta The White Horse Inn)
- The White Horse Inn, directed by Willi Forst (1952, based on the operetta The White Horse Inn)
- The Great Lola, directed by Hans Deppe (1954, based on the play Der Weg zur Hölle)
- Familie Schimek, directed by Georg Jacoby (1957, based on the play Familie Schimek)
- The White Horse Inn, directed by Werner Jacobs (1960, based on the operetta The White Horse Inn)
- Summer in Tyrol, directed by Erik Balling (Denmark, 1964, based on the operetta The White Horse Inn)
- The White Horse Inn, directed by Christian Theede (2013, based on the operetta The White Horse Inn)
