= Whitehorse Mountain =

Whitehorse Mountain or White Horse Mountain may refer to:

- Whitehorse Mountain (New York) in the Black Rock Forest, New York, U.S.
- Whitehorse Mountain (Washington), U.S.
- Whitehorse Mountain (British Columbia) in the Cariboo Mountains, Canada
- Whitehorse Mountains in California, U.S.
- White Horse Mountains, in Oregon, U.S.
