= The White Horse Inn (1952 film) =

1952 film

- Directed by: Willi Forst
- Written by: Horst Budjuhn; Harry Halm; Oskar Blumenthal (play); Gustaf Kadelburg (play); Hans Müller (operetta); Erik Charell (operetta)
- Produced by: Erik Charell; Günther Stapenhorst
- Starring: Johanna Matz; Johannes Heesters; Walter Müller
- Cinematography: Günther Anders
- Edited by: Margot von Schlieffen; Doris Zeltmann
- Music by: Ralph Benatzky; Robert Gilbert; Werner Eisbrenner; Robert Stolz
- Production companies: Carlton-Film; Styria-Film
- Distributed by: Gloria Film
- Release date: 19 December 1952
- Running time: 95 minutes
- Country: West Germany
- Language: German

The White Horse Inn (German: Im weißen Rößl) is a 1952 West German musical film directed by Willi Forst and starring Johanna Matz, Johannes Heesters and Walter Müller. It is based on the operetta The White Horse Inn and is part of the operetta film genre.

It was shot in studios in Munich and on location around Lake Kochel in southern Bavaria. The film's sets were designed by Kurt Herlth, Robert Herlth and Willy Schatz. Paula Wessely was originally intended to star, but because she was unavailable, the lead role was rewritten for Johanna Matz.

== Cast ==
- Johanna Matz as Josepha
- Johannes Heesters as Dr. Siedler
- Walter Müller as Leopold
- Rudolf Forster as Kaiser Franz Josef
- Paul Westermeier as Giesecke
- Marianne Wischmann as Ottilie Giesecke
- Sepp Nigg as Prof. Hinzelmann
- Ingrid Pan as Klärchen Hinzelmann
- Ulrich Beiger as Sigismund
- Klaus Pohl as Bettler Loidl
- Walter Koch as Piccolo Gustl
- Alfred Pongratz as Bürgermeister
- Meggie Rehrl-Hentze as Französische Braut
- Jean Gargoet as Französischer Bräutigam

== Bibliography ==
- Hake, Sabine. German National Cinema. Routledge, 2013.
