= Lotte (film) =

1928 film directed by Carl Froelich

- Directed by: Carl Froelich
- Written by: Fred Hildenbrand; Walter Supper
- Produced by: Carl Froelich; Henny Porten; Wilhelm von Kaufmann
- Starring: Henny Porten
- Cinematography: Gustave Preiss
- Production companies: Carl Froelich-Film; Henny Porten Film
- Distributed by: Parufamet
- Release date: 18 April 1928
- Country: Germany
- Languages: Silent; German intertitles

Lotte is a 1928 German silent film directed by Carl Froelich and starring Henny Porten, Walter Jankuhn and Hermann Vallentin. Lotte, a young woman from an aristocratic background, masquerades as a poor person. Art direction was by Franz Schroedter.

== Cast ==
- Henny Porten as Lotte - Tochter Süßkinds
- Walter Jankuhn as Harald von Lindenberg
- Hermann Vallentin as Burgkastellan Süßkind
- Elsa Wagner as Anita Negrelli - Hofschauspielerin a.D.
- Lotte Werkmeister as Amalie Süßkind - seine zweite Frau
- Alexandra Schmitt as Frau Wehmut - Hebamme a.D.
- Ralph Arthur Roberts as Möricke - Schlosser a.D.
- Paul Passarge
- Adele Sandrock

== Bibliography ==
- Kreimeier, Klaus. The Ufa Story: A History of Germany's Greatest Film Company, 1918-1945. University of California Press, 1999.
