= The White Horse Inn (1926 film) =

1926 film directed by Richard Oswald

- Directed by: Richard Oswald
- Written by: Oskar Blumenthal (play); Gustaf Kadelburg (play); Alfred Halm
- Produced by: Richard Oswald
- Starring: Liane Haid; Max Hansen; Henry Bender; Livio Pavanelli
- Cinematography: Arpad Viragh
- Music by: Werner R. Heymann
- Production company: Richard-Oswald-Produktion
- Distributed by: Süd-Film
- Release date: 27 August 1926
- Running time: 70 minutes
- Country: Germany
- Languages: Silent; German intertitles

The White Horse Inn (German: Im weißen Rößl) is a 1926 German silent comedy film directed by Richard Oswald and starring Liane Haid, Max Hansen, and Henry Bender. It is based on the play The White Horse Inn by Oskar Blumenthal and Gustav Kadelburg.

== Cast ==
- Liane Haid as Josefa Voglhuber, Wirtin
- Max Hansen as Leopold Brandmayer, Zahlkellner
- Henry Bender as Wilhelm Giesecke
- Livio Pavanelli as Doctor Siedler
- Maly Delschaft as Ottilie Giesecke
- Hermann Picha as Hinzelmann, Privatgelehrter
- Ferdinand Bonn as Bauer
- Anton Pointner
- Anita Dorris

== See also ==
- When I Came Back (sequel, 1926)
