= Cheval Blanc, St Barths =

Hotel in Saint Barthélemy

Coordinates: 17°55′8″N 62°51′19″W

Cheval Blanc is a luxury colonial-style hotel in Saint Barthélemy in the Caribbean, situated on Flamands Beach on the northwestern coast. It was awarded AAA/CAA Four Diamond Lodgings status for 2015. Established in 1991, the hotel contains 40 rooms, suites and villas, which start in size at 645 square feet (59.9 m^{2}). CNN notes that the interior white-washed furnishings are inspired by those of French chateaus, and that salmon pink is a common rendering. The hotel is served by two restaurants, La Case de l'Isle headed by Yann Vinsot by the pool, and La Cabane de l'Isle, and is frequented by wealthy celebrities, including Jay Z and Beyoncé, Ryan Seacrest, P. Diddy, Anthony Kiedis, Russell Simmons and Marc Jacobs.

The hotel is owned by luxury conglomerate LVMH and French entrepreneur Xavier Niel since 2013.
