= Cheval Blanc (restaurant) =

Coordinates: 52°21′37.05″N 4°37′43.81″E

- Interactive map of Cheval Blanc

Restaurant information
- Established: 1996
- Head chef: Huub van der Velden
- Food type: French, International
- Rating: Michelin Guide
- Location: Jan van Goyenstraat 29, Heemstede, 2102 CA, Netherlands
- Seating capacity: 40
- Website: Official website

Cheval Blanc is a restaurant in Heemstede in the Netherlands. It is a fine dining restaurant that is awarded one Michelin star in the period 2007–present. The restaurant was awarded a Bib Gourmand in the period 2002–2006.

GaultMillau awarded the restaurant 13 out of 20 points in 2013.

Head chef of Cheval Blanc is Huub van der Velden.

== See also ==
- List of Michelin starred restaurants in the Netherlands
