= The White Horse Inn (play) =

1897 German play by Oscar Blumenthal and Gustav Kadelburg

The White Horse Inn (or White Horse Inn) (German title: Im weißen Rößl) is a play by Oscar Blumenthal and Gustav Kadelburg. Set in the Salzkammergut region of Upper Austria, the farce humorously juxtaposes the lives and attitudes of urban tourists vacationing in the Northern Limestone Alps and the local inhabitants who reside near the White Horse Inn where the vacationers are staying. The work was popular both in Europe and in theaters serving the German-American community in the United States in the early 20th century.

The White Horse Inn premiered in Berlin in 1897. Sydney Rosenfeld translated the work into English. His version of the play, titled At the White Horse Inn, was staged on Broadway at Wallack's Theatre in 1899. The New York cast including Amelia Bingham and Leo Ditrichstein. The play was the basis for Ralph Benatzky and Robert Stolz's 1930 operetta The White Horse Inn.
