= Sydney Rosenfeld =

American dramatist

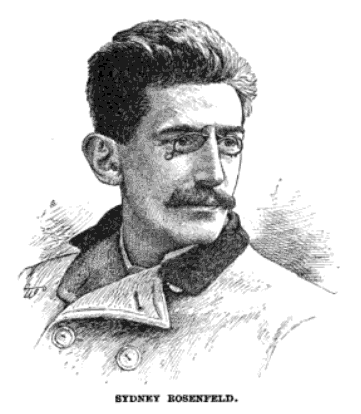
- Sydney Rosenfeld circa 1892
- Born: October 26, 1855; Richmond, Virginia, US
- Died: June 13, 1931 (aged 75); New York City, US
- Occupation: Playwright
- Years active: 1874 to 1923
- Spouse: Genie H. Johnson (m. 1883)

Sydney Rosenfeld (1855–1931) was an American playwright who wrote numerous plays, and adapted many foreign plays. Close to fifty of his creations played on Broadway.

Some of his better known plays (though none achieved long-lasting popularity) included A House of Cards, The King's Carnival, The Lady, or the Tiger?, The Vanderbilt Cup, The Aero Club, The Senator, Mlle. Mischief, The Mocking Bird, A Man of Ideas, The 20th Century Girl, Jumping Jupiter, and The Optimist.

== Biography ==
Rosenfeld was born to a Jewish family in Richmond, Virginia in 1855, and came to New York during the American Civil War. He began producing plays in 1874, starting with a burlesque of Rose Michel called Rosemy Shell. He began writing boy's stories at age 15. He served as the first editor of the English edition of Puck magazine as well as writing for The Sun and the New York World, but left journalism by age 19.

According to The Chronology of American Literature (2004), Rosenfeld was a "prolific adapter of foreign plays, often accused of plagiarism, who had nearly fifty plays reach Broadway during his career." In 1890, the New York Times stated that Rosenfeld's "habit is to try to dash off an epoch making comedy between breakfast and luncheon," though despite "all his evident carelessness, his lack of application, and his frequently misplaced confidence in his own powers, (he) possesses a gift of originality which Belasco and De Mille either lack altogether or rigorously suppress."

Gerald Bordman's American Music Theatre: A Chronicle describes Rosenfeld as "long a colorful, controversial figure on the American theatrical scene"; "he enjoyed some fame with a few hits and considerably more notoriety with his frequently gadfly behavior." By the mid 1910s, his knack of striking some hits ran dry, though he continued to mount plays until 1923. At the time of his death in 1931, since Rosenfeld had been inactive for a number of years, his "importance to an earlier theatrical world was not universally appreciated." He died with meager wealth; his estate was only reported to be worth $100.

== Selected plays ==
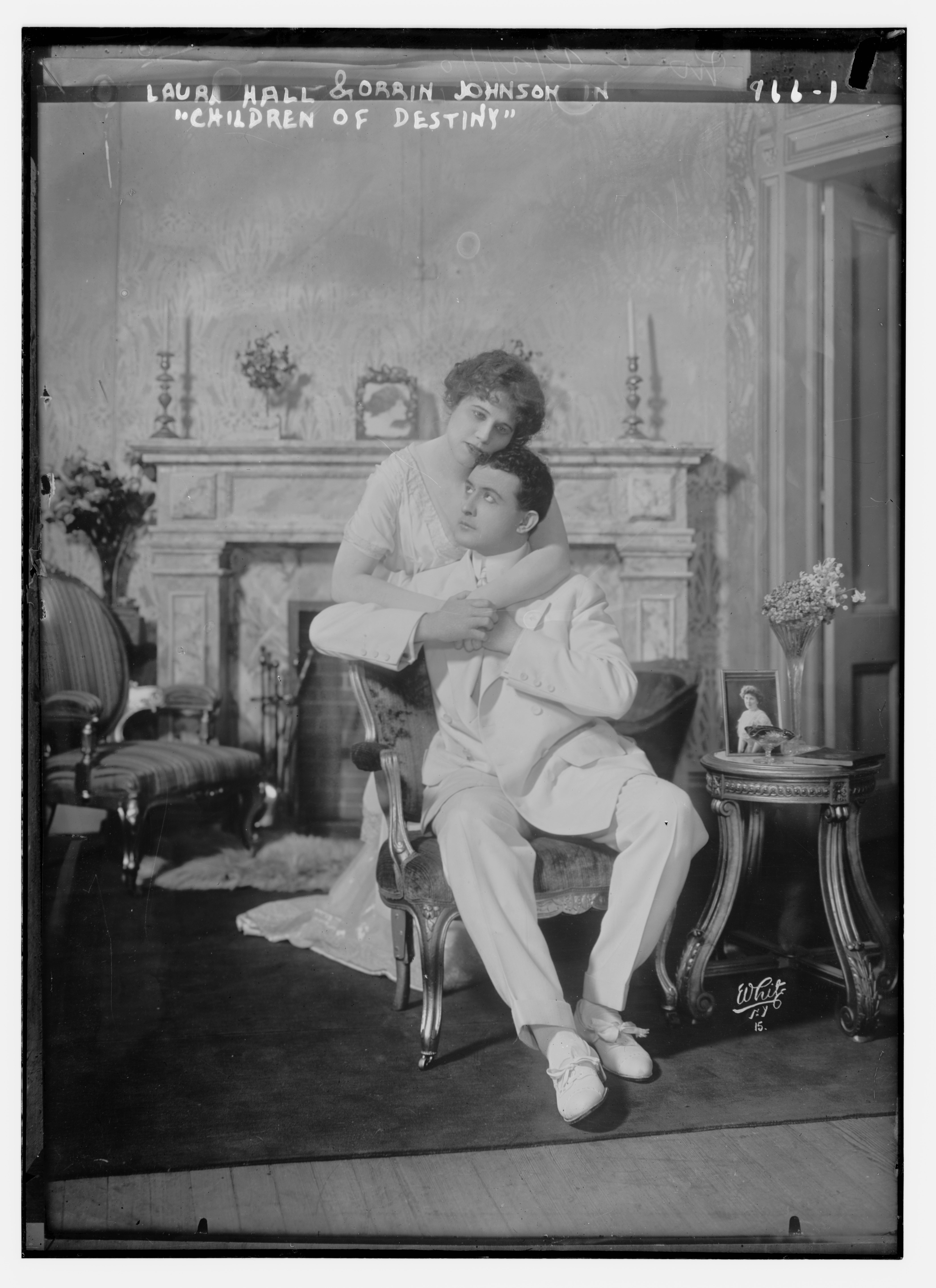
Laura Hall and Orrin Johnson in the Broadway production of Children of Destiny (1910), adapted for film in 1920

- Rosemy Shell (1874) (a burlesque of Rose Michel)
- Dr. Clyde (1878) (adaptation of Doctor Klaus by Adolphe L'Arronge)
- Florinel (1879; dates vary in sources)
- The Storm Child (1880) (for actress Minnie Maddern Fiske)
- The Sea Cadet (1880) (translation of Richard Genée and Friedrich Zell work Der Seekadet)(played June 7–12, 1880 at the Fifth Avenue Theatre)
- Nanon (1885) (translation of Richard Genée and Friedrich Zell work)
- The Black Hussar (1885) (adaptation of Carl Millöcker operetta Der Feldprediger)
- The Gypsy Baron (1886) (translation of German operetta by Johann Strauss II)
- The Bridal Trap (1886) (translation of Edmond Audran's Serment d'mour)
- A Possible Case (1888)
- The Lady, or the Tiger? (1888) (adapted from the short story by Frank R. Stockton)
- The Oolah (1889) (an adaptation of Charles Lecocq's La Jolie Persane) (starred actor Francis Wilson)
- The Senator (1890) (written with David D. Lloyd, who died before completing the play, and title character modeled on Senator Preston B. Plumb. Starred actor William H. Crane and Georgie Drew Barrymore; also adapted to a silent film in 1915.)
- The Whirlwind (1890) (written for actress Helen Dauvray)
- The Stepping-stone (1890)
- The Club Friend (1891)
- The Passing Show (1894)
- The 20th Century Girl (1895)
- A House of Cards (1896)
- The Two Escutcheons (1896) (an adaptation of Gustav Kadelburg and Oscar Blumenthal's German play Zwei Wappen)
- A Man of Ideas (1897)
- A Dangerous Maid (1898) (adaptation of the Viennese play Heisses Blut by Leopold Krenn and Karl Lindau)
- At the White Horse Inn (1899) (an adaptation of Gustav Kadelburg and Oscar Blumenthal's German play The White Horse Inn)
- The Purple Lady (1899) (adapted from an uncredited German play) (also made into a silent film in 1916)
- The King's Carnival (1901)
- The Hall of Fame (1902) (with George V. Hobart)
- The Mocking Bird (1902)
- The Rollicking Girl (1905) (a rewrite of A Dangerous Maid, with music added by W.T. Francis, and starring Sam Bernard)
- A Society Circus (1905)
- The Vanderbilt Cup (1906) (with actress Elsie Janis)
- The Optimist (1906)
- The Aero Club (1907)
- Mlle. Mischief (1908)
- Children of Destiny (1910) (with actress Laura Nelson Hall)(also made into a silent film in 1920)
- Jumping Jupiter (1911) (a reboot of 1899's The Purple Lady)
- The Opera Ball (1912) (with Clare Kummer), an adaptation of Der Opernball by Viktor Léon and Heinrich von Waldberg
- The Charm of Isabel (1914)
- The Love Drive (1917)
- Under Pressure (1918) (a reworked version of The Love Drive)
- Forbidden / Virginia Runs Away (1923)
