= Walter Jankuhn =

German opera singer

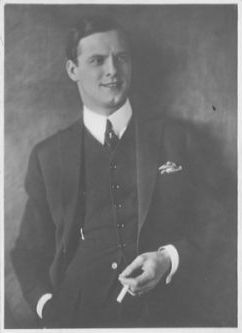
- Born: 14 July 1888; Königsberg, Germany
- Died: 22 May 1953 (aged 64); Berlin, Germany

Walter Jankuhn (14 July 1888 - 22 May 1953) was a German classical tenor. He also played the main role in the film It's You I Have Loved.

== Selected filmography ==
Year	Title	Role	Notes
1928	Lotte		
1929	It's You I Have Loved	Otto Radney	
