= Ofer Grosbard =

Israeli psychologist (born 1954)

- עפר גרוזברד
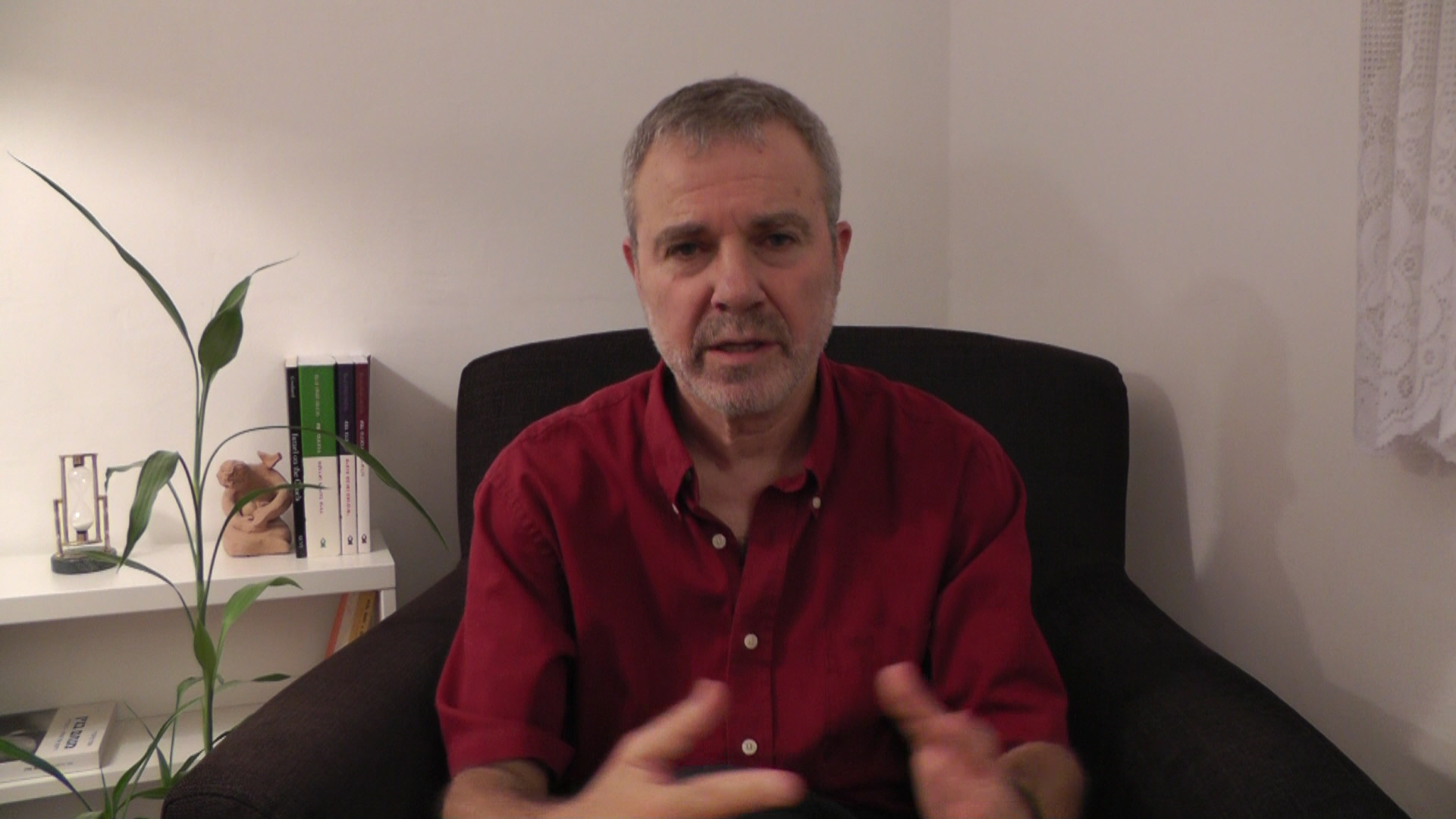
- Born: December 27, 1954 (age 71); Tel Aviv, Israel
- Occupations: Clinical psychologist and lecturer

Academic background
- Education: George Mason University Ph.D. (2001)

Academic work
- Discipline: Psychology
- Institutions: Tel Aviv University

Ofer Grosbard (Hebrew: עפר גרוזברד; born December 27, 1954) is a clinical psychologist, cultural researcher, Israeli writer and lecturer at Tel Aviv University.

== Biography ==
After his military service he was enrolled to the Technion and graduated in Computer Engineering (1982). He studied then obtained a bachelor's in psychology at Haifa University (1985) and a master's in developmental clinical psychology at Tel Aviv University (1991). In 2001, he earned his Ph.D. in Conflict Analysis and Resolution at George Mason University.

Grosbard was a research associate in the Strategic Research and Policy Center, Israel's National Defense College. He teaches at the International Master's in Diplomacy and Security Studies at Tel Aviv University and created the "Dialogue" website for Israeli and international students and the Muslim world.

== Books ==
- License for Insanity – a novel telling the story of an adolescent girl who is hospitalized in a Psychiatric adolescent ward and undergoes there psychoanalysis. The novel describes her friends in the ward the life there and her therapy.
- The Arab Within – a psychological – political novel which tries to explore the emotional roots of the Israeli – Arab conflict. It won the Israel Writers Association’s book of the year prize, 2000.
- Israel on the Couch – represents the peace process as essentially an emotional - psychological process rather than rational one.
- Menachem Begin – The Absent Leader – a biography which uses psychological tools in order to understand his life and deeds. The book argues – contrary to the convention – that his depression prior to the First Lebanese War was the reason for the escalation of the war and not that his failure in this war brought his depression. The book won The Menachem Begin Heritage Center Research Prize, 2004.

Grosbard wrote the four volumes of the "Cultural Code" series which deals with cross-cultural education and was published by Ben-Gurion University of the Negev.

- Cracking the Cultural Code – deals with the different way of thinking of the two main cultures in our world – the western which tends to be modern-individual and the eastern which is mostly traditional-collective. Relying on many examples from parent-child relations the book explains how these two thinking modes shape creative, scientific and democratic way of thinking within children.
- Dialogue – 123 therapeutic tales from traditional societies and their resolution – presents a dialogue between eastern and western cultures concerning educational difficulties. The book is based on real conversations between the lecturer and his students who presented their cases at the Academic Arab College for Education in Haifa.
- The Quran for Educating the Child – integrates modern psychology and the Quran in order to help Muslim parents to solve every day educational difficulties with their children. This book and its web version "Quranet" (www.quranet.net) were chosen to represent Israel at the Israel President’s Conference, 2008.
- Babylon – A Guide to the East-West Encounter – teaches both cultures to understand each other and also to "talk" in the other's cultural language. It is based on examples from negotiations between Israel and America from one side and the Arab world from the other side.
- The Orgasm Fantasy
