= White Nights (Begin book) =

White Nights: the Story of a Prisoner in Russia is an autobiographical memoir by Menachem Begin, the sixth Prime Minister of Israel, describing his imprisonment in the Soviet gulag labour camps during 1940-1942. The book was first published in Hebrew in 1957 and first available in English translation in 1977.

Along with a description of the author's own harrowing experiences in the camps, the book contains various observations on the real-life operation of the Soviet system and the psychology of some of its minions.

When the book first came out, serious doubts were expressed over whether Begin really could have dared to so boldly express his Zionist worldview to the interrogators under the pressure of the "interrogation" he underwent in the Soviet prison. However, after the collapse of the Soviet Union, Begin's NKVD investigation file was declassified, and was found to corroborate the account he gave in the book. White Nights was subsequently re-published in 1995 together with the investigation documents from Begin's file.
