= My Leopold =

My Leopold (German: Mein Leopold) may refer to:

- My Leopold (play), a 1873 play by Adolphe L'Arronge
- My Leopold (1914 film), a silent German film directed by Heinrich Bolten-Baeckers
- My Leopold (1919 film), a silent German film directed by Heinrich Bolten-Baeckers
- My Leopold (1924 film), a silent German film directed by Heinrich Bolten-Baeckers
- My Leopold (1931 film), a German film directed by Hans Steinhoff
- My Leopold (1955 film), a West German film directed by Géza von Bolváry
