= 1880 in literature =

This article contains information about the literary events and publications of 1880.

== Events ==
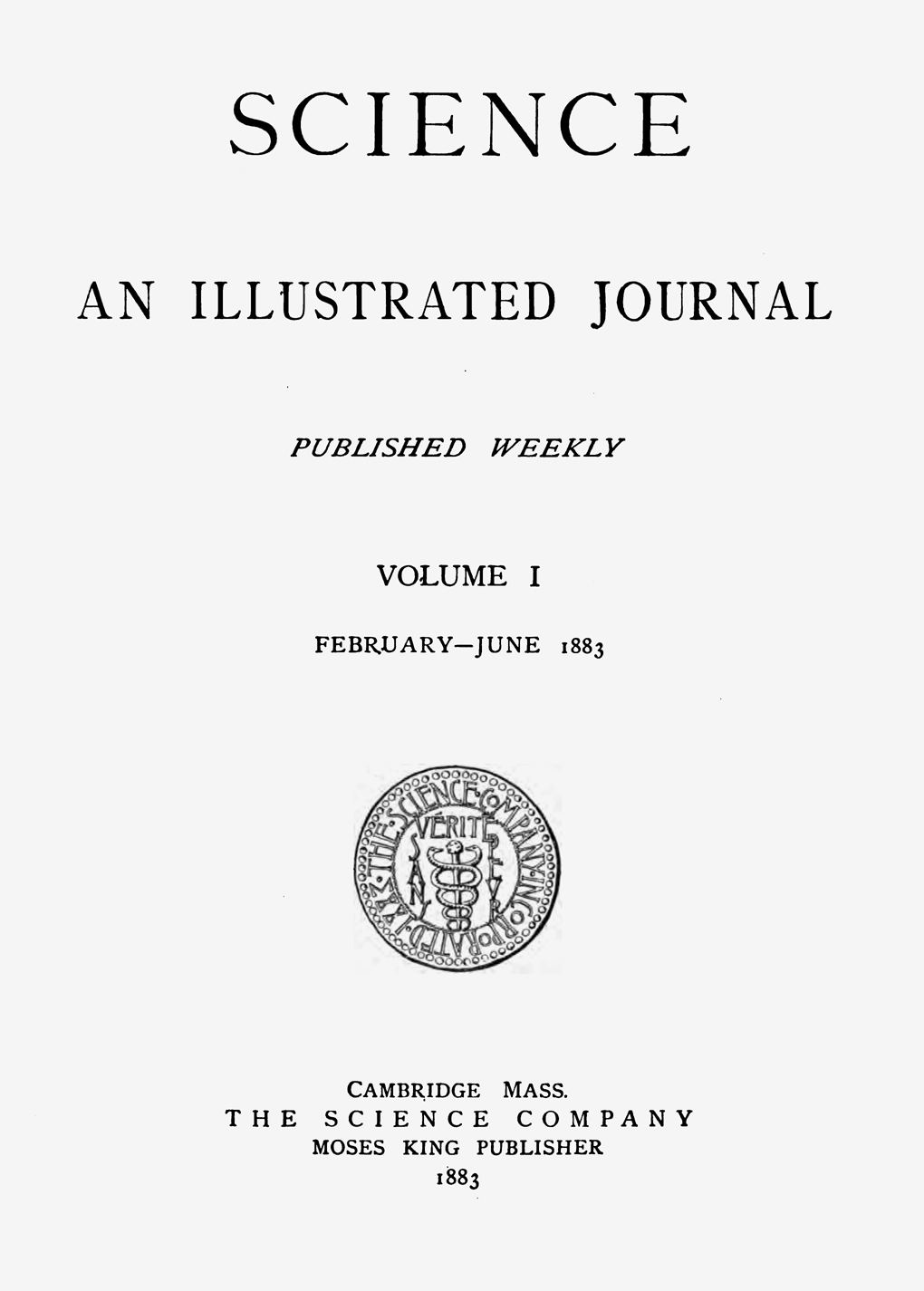
Title page of the first volume of the resurrected journal Science (February–June 1883)

- February – The journal Science is first published in the United States, with financial backing from Thomas Edison.
- April – Publication in France of Les Soirées de Médan, a collection of six Naturalist short stories set during the Franco-Prussian War by six authors who frequent Émile Zola's home, including Guy de Maupassant's first, "Boule de Suif", which launches his career.
- April 20 (O. S.: April 8) – At the Romanian Academy, Titu Maiorescu announces a reformed Romanian alphabet, adopted by a commission also comprising George Bariț and Bogdan Petriceicu Hasdeu. The rationalized spelling reflects ideas endorsed by Maiorescu since the 1860s, replacing the deep orthography favored by "Latinists".
- May – In the United States, the publishing business of Henry Oscar Houghton and George H. Mifflin is reconstructed as Houghton, Mifflin and Company.
- June 6 – Statue of Alexander Pushkin (d. 1837), sculpted by Alexander Opekushin, is unveiled in Strastnaya Square, Moscow.
- October – Henry James's novel The Portrait of a Lady begins serial publication in Macmillan's Magazine (U.K.) and The Atlantic Monthly (U.S.)
- December 15 – First performance of a play by Henrik Ibsen in English, The Pillars of Society (under the title Quicksands) at the Gaiety Theatre, London.

== New books ==
=== Fiction ===
- Henry Adams (anonymously) – Democracy: An American Novel
- Rhoda Broughton – Second Thoughts
- Wilkie Collins – Jezebel's Daughter
- Benjamin Disraeli, 1st Earl of Beaconsfield – Endymion
- Fyodor Dostoevsky – The Brothers Karamazov (99Братья Карамазовы, Brat'ya Karamazovy)
- Amelia Edwards – Lord Brackenbury
- Theodor Fontane
  - Grete Minde
  - Wanderungen durch die Mark Brandenburg
- George Gissing – Workers in the Dawn
- Walter T. Gray (Metta Victoria Fuller Victor) – A Bad Boy's Diary
- Percy Greg – Across the Zodiac
- Anna Katharine Green – A Strange Disappearance
- Thomas Hardy – The Trumpet-Major
- Henry Kendall – Songs from the Mountains
- Alexander Kielland – Garman og Worse
- Pierre Loti – Le Mariage de Loti (as Rarahu)
- Ouida – Moths
- Louisa Parr – Adam and Eve
- Mikhail Saltykov-Shchedrin – The Golovlyov Family (Господа Головлёвы, Gospoda Golovlyovy)
- Anthony Trollope – The Duke's Children
- Mark Twain – A Tramp Abroad
- Giovanni Verga – Vita dei campi (The Life of the Fields, short stories, including "Cavalleria rusticana" – "Rustic chivalry")
- Lew Wallace – Ben-Hur: A Tale of the Christ
- Émile Zola – Nana

=== Children and young people ===
- Evelyn Everett-Green (as H.F E.) – Tom Tempest's Victory
- Johanna Spyri – Heidi
- Jules Verne – The Steam House (La Maison à vapeur)

=== Drama ===
- Adolphe L'Arronge – The Lonei Household (Haus Lonei)
- Augustus Harris and Paul Meritt – The World
- Oscar Wilde – Vera; or, The Nihilists (privately printed)

=== Poetry ===
- Anne Evans (died 1870) – Poems and Music (with a memorial preface by Anne Isabella Thackeray)

=== Non-fiction ===
- Henry Charlton Bastian – The Brain as an Organ of Mind
- James Legge – The Religions of China
- Algernon Charles Swinburne – A Study of Shakespeare
- Charles Warren – The Temple or the Tomb. Giving further evidence in favour of the authenticity of the present site of the Holy Sepulchre

== Births ==
- February 21 – Waldemar Bonsels, German writer (died 1952)
- February 27 – Angelina Weld Grimké, African-American playwright and poet (died 1958)
- March 1 – Lytton Strachey, English critic and biographer (died 1932)
- March 4 – Channing Pollock, American playwright and critic (died 1946)
- March 13 – Frank Thiess, German writer (died 1977)
- March 21 – E. H. Young, English novelist (died 1949)
- March 30 – Seán O'Casey, Irish dramatist (died 1964)
- June 10 – Margit Kaffka, Hungarian novelist, short story writer and poet (died 1918)
- June 17 – Carl Van Vechten, American writer (died 1964)
- June 27 – Helen Keller, American writer and lecturer (died 1968)
- July 4 – Anne Beffort, Luxembourg literary writer and biographer (died 1966)
- July 10 – Greye La Spina, American writer (died 1969)
- August 5 – Ruth Sawyer, American children's writer and novelist (died 1970)
- August 15 – Anna Rüling, German journalist, the first known lesbian activist (died 1953)
- August 26 – Guillaume Apollinaire, French poet and dramatist (died 1918)
- September 12 – H. L. Mencken, American journalist and English language scholar (died 1956)
- October 4 – Damon Runyon, American journalist and short-story writer (died 1946)
- October 17 – Vasile Cijevschi, Bessarabian Romanian soldier, journalist and short-story writer (died 1931)
- October 18 – Ze'ev Jabotinsky, Russian-born Zionist leader, novelist and poet (died 1940)
- November 1 – Grantland Rice, American sports writer (died 1954)
- November 6 – Robert Musil, Austrian novelist (died 1942)
- November 25 – Elsie J. Oxenham (Elsie Jeanette Dunkerley), English story writer for girls (died 1960)
- November 29 – N. D. Cocea, Romanian novelist, critic and journalist (died 1949)
- December 24 – Johnny Gruelle, American cartoonist and children's author (died 1938)

== Deaths ==
- January 12 – Ida, Countess von Hahn-Hahn, German author (born 1805)
- February 12 – Karl Eduard von Holtei, German poet and dramatist (born 1798)
- February 17 – James Lenox, American bibliophile (born 1800)
- April 9 – Louis Edmond Duranty, French novelist and critic (born 1833)
- April 16 – Edward Vaughan Hyde Kenealy, Irish writer and barrister (born 1819)
- April 18 – Costache Aristia, Wallachian translator, poet, dramatist and actor (born 1800)
- May 2 – Eunice Hale Cobb, American writer, public speaker, and activist (born 1803)
- May 5 – Andrei Mocioni, Hungarian-Romanian journalist and literary patron (born 1812)
- May 6 – Ivan Surikov, Russian poet (born 1841)
- May 8 – Gustave Flaubert, French novelist (born 1821)
- May 30 – James Planché, English dramatist (born 1796)
- June 7 – Karl Christian Planck, German philosopher (born 1819)
- July 7 – Lydia Maria Child, American writer and abolitionist (born 1802)
- July 12 – Tom Taylor, English dramatist and journalist (born 1817)
- September 23 – Geraldine Jewsbury, English novelist and woman of letters (born 1812)
- December 22 – George Eliot (Mary Anne Cross), English novelist (born 1819)

== Awards ==
- Commander, First Class of the Order of St. Olav – Andreas Munch
- Newdigate Prize – Rennell Rodd, "Raleigh"
