= Olivia Fuchs =

British-German opera director (born 1963)

Olivia Fuchs (born 1963) is a British-German stage director.

== Career ==
Olivia Fuchs was born in 1963 in London and holds dual citizenship (British and German). She was first educated in West Germany and went on to study at Westfield College at the University of London and at Berkley University in California. She also completed a Postgraduate Acting course at the Drama Studio in London.

She has mainly worked at Opera Holland Park in London, Theater Magdeburg in Germany and at the Den Jyske Opera, the Danish National Opera, where she directed three Verdi operas: Rigoletto, La traviata, Il trovatore. Notable productions include Der Rosenkavalier at Welsh National Opera and The Marriage of Figaro at the English National Opera, Britten's A Midsummer Night's Dream at the Royal Opera House in London, and Dvořák's Rusalka at Opera Australia and at Opera North. She was invited by Teatro Colón in Buenos Aires for Debussy's Pelléas et Mélisande and by the Scottish Opera for Ines de Castro, an opera about a Galician noblewoman and courtier, lover and secret wife of King Pedro I of Portugal. In Oviedo she has directed Madama Butterfly and The Magic Flute, in Oldenburg Dead Man Walking, in Garsington The Rake's Progress and Hänsel and Gretel, and in Longborough The Cunning Little Vixen. At the Theater Magdeburg, Olivia Faust staged Der Rosenkavalier, Otello, Madama Butterfly and the world premiere of Grete Minde by Eugen Engel. At Opera Holland Park she staged Káťa Kabanová, Jenůfa, Iolanta, Fidelio, Macbeth, Lucia di Lammermoor, and Iris, seven operas in which women are the principal characters.

In Autumn of 2022, her interpretation of Janáček's The Makropulos Affair premiered at the Welsh National Opera. This production was also shown on tour in the UK and in Brno, at the 2022 Janáček Festival, with Ángeles Blancas Gulín in the title role. In July 2023, the Longborough Festival Opera presented her new staging of Monteverdi's L'Orfeo, with Peter Gijsbertsen in the title role.

== Accolades ==
- 2007 Helpmann Award for Best Direction of an Opera, nomination for Rusalka at Sydney Opera House
- 2007 Green Room Award for Best Opera Production (to Opera Australia) and for Best Direction in Opera (to Olivia Fuchs)
