= Charles Decroix =

French director, film producer and screenwriter

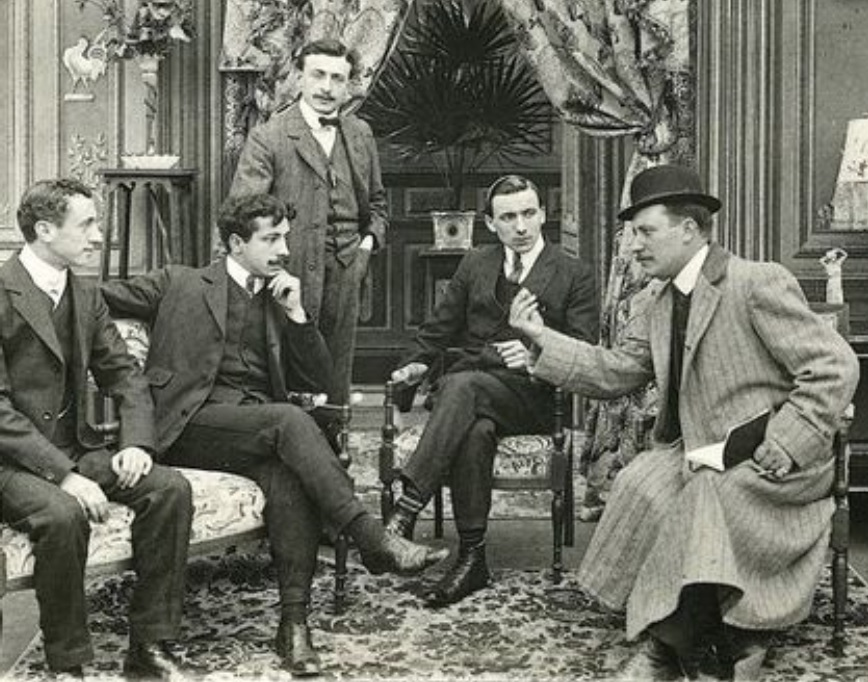
Decroix (right) during a break in filming, 1908

Charles Decroix (born late 19th century; died after 1919) was a French director, film producer and screenwriter whose career reached a peak in Germany in the period before World War I, one of the forgotten pioneers from the early days of European cinema.

== Biography ==
=== Early successes ===
The son of an Alsatian shoemaker, Decroix joined cinematography in 1899, a field that had barely developed until then. Subsequently, he initially wrote scripts for various companies.

In 1907, Decroix was hired by Pathé, for whom he directed, among other films, Children's Reformatory; a Balzac adaptation of Les paysans; and a short film grotesque with Max Linder, Une conquête.

In the spring of 1910, Decroix came to Berlin and spent the next four years shooting for German production companies. Until the outbreak of World War I, he was one of the leading filmmakers in the early days of German cinematography, providing its first artistic inspirations and technical know-how. Both his dramas and a series of comedies met with critical acclaim.

In 1912, he went to Italy and worked briefly for Milano Films.

In 1913, he came back to Berlin and founded his own production company, Films Charles Decroix. Decroix was the discoverer of subsequently celebrated silent film stars such as Bernd Aldor and Fern Andra. He was also a mentor to film director Carl Wilhelm. He also worked for Dekage (Deutsche Kinematograph Gesellschaft), Monopol-Film and Continental-Kunstfilm.

=== Internment in Switzerland ===
A French citizen, Decroix fled Berlin in August 1914 at the outbreak of World War I and the resulting declaration of war by the German Empire on France. At the time, he was in the midst of filming the Andra melodrama Moon Fisherman, which remained unfinished. He set out for Switzerland, where he was interned in the village of Frutigen until the end of the war in 1918. Only in the period between the beginning and the summer of 1917 did he manage to obtain directing assignments for several films in and around Zürich.

=== Postwar activities ===
After the end of the war, Decroix returned to France. In Alsace he tried to continue his film career in 1919, with the creation of the production company Le film alsacien. However, his stay in Germany before the war brought him fierce hostility and thwarted the realization of his projects. He then returned to Berlin for two film projects, which he realized with Heinrich Bolten-Baeckers. After these two comedy films starring Leo Peukert and Sabine Impekoven, Decroix was no longer involved in cinema.

Nothing is known of his life subsequently.

== Selected filmography as director ==
1907–1910 in France, 1910–1914 and 1921–1922 in Germany, 1917 in Switzerland:

1907: Children's Reformatory; 1908: Pédicure d’amour; 1909: La victime; 1909: Dans l’Hellade; 1909: Les paysans; 1909: Une conquête; 1910: Aimez-vous les uns les autr; 1910: Haine implacable; 1910: Affaire d’honneur; 1910: Die Vernunft des Herzens; 1910: Der Hühneraugenoperateur; 1910: Der Leuchtturmwächter; 1910: Graf Gallas; 1910: Das vierte Gebot; 1910: Die Spinne; 1910: Weihnachtstränen; 1910: Pro Patria; 1911: Das Herz einer Gattin; 1911: Die neue Gouvernante; 1911: Die guten Hosen; 1912: Mona Lisa; 1913: Freunde; 1913: Der Fleck; 1913: Die Czernowska	1913: Le Nouveau Sous-préfet; 1913: Ave Maria; 1913: Die Affaire Dumaine; 1913: Die Freuden der Reserveübung; 1913: Brutal; 1913: Gütertrennung?; 1913: Vae Victis!; 1914: Die kleine Heiratsvermittlerin; 1914: Schwitzbad G.m.b.H.; 1914: Die Unschuld vom Lande; 1914: Zimmer No. 22; 1914: Ein Frauenherz; 1914: Der Stern; 1914: Im Liebestaumel; 1917: Ein Ausflug der französischen Internierten von Interlaken nach der Schynigen Platte (short documentary); 1917: Seeregatta auf dem Zürichsee (short documentary); 1917: Die sieben Todsünden: Der Zorn; 1917: Endlich allein; 1917: Grenze besetzt!; 1917: Frühlingsmanöver; 1921: Der Herr Papa (co-director); 1922: Der Herr Landrat (co-director)
