= Grete Minde (opera) =

Opera by Eugen Engel

Grete Minde is an opera by composer Eugen Engel on a libretto by the Magdeburg author and radio pioneer Hans Bodenstedt, based on the novella by Theodor Fontane. Engel, who made a living as a textile tradesman, entrusted his manuscript score to his daughter when she escaped to the United States in 1941. The composer was murdered in the Sobibor extermination camp in 1943. Both composer and work were forgotten until director Anna Skryleva was introduced to the opera in 2019. The Opera is written is a style similar to Humperdinck with melodic arias and large choral scenes.

== Plot ==
The plot concerns Margarete von Minden, who in 1619 set fire to the town of Tangermünde.

== Cast ==
For the premiere at Theater Magdeburg the cast were:

- The Domina — Karina Repova
- Gerdt Minde — Marko Pantelić / Johannes Wollrab
- Grete Minde — Raffaela Lintl
- Emerentz Zernitz — Jawiga Postrożna
- The old Gigas — Paul Sketris
- Peter Guntz — Johannes Stermann
- The puppeteer — Johannes Wollrab
- The buffoon — Benjamin Lee
- Zenobia — Na'ama Shulman / Jeanett Neumeister
- Valtin — Zoltán Nyári
- Trud Minde — Kristi Anna Isene
- A host — Frank Heinrich

== Recording ==
Grete Minde - Marko Pantelić, Kristi Anna Isene, Jan Arik Redmer, Raffaela Lintl, Jadwiga Postrozna, Zoltan Nyari, Paul Sketris, Johannes Stermann, Opernchor Des Theaters Magdeburg, Magdeburgische Philharmonie Anna Skryleva 2CD 2023 Orfeo
