= The Second Mother =

The Second Mother may refer to:

- The Second Mother (1925 film), a German film directed by Heinrich Bolten-Baeckers
- The Second Mother (2015 film), a Brazilian film directed by Anna Muylaert
