= Abraham Hayward =

English man of letters

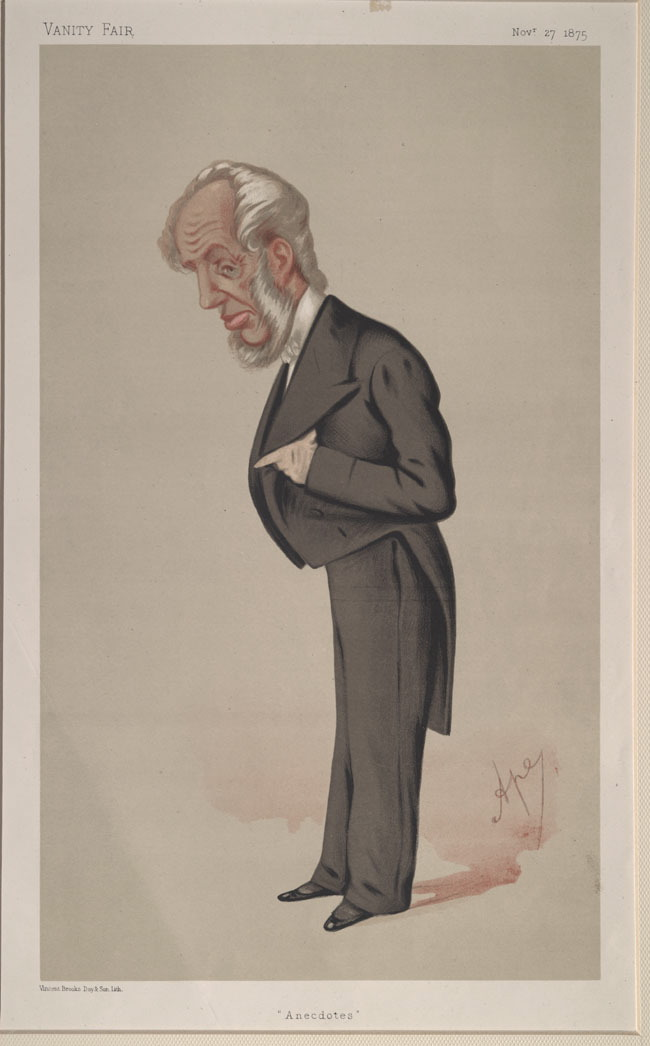
"Anecdotes". Caricature by Ape published in Vanity Fair in 1875.

Abraham Hayward Q.C. (22 November 1801 – 2 February 1884) was an English writer and translator.

== Life ==
He was son of Joseph Hayward, and was born in Wilton, near Salisbury, Wiltshire.

After education at Blundell's School, Tiverton, he entered the Inner Temple in 1824, and was called to the bar in June 1832. He took part as a conservative in the discussions of the London Debating Society, where his opponents were J A Roebuck and John Stuart Mill. The editorship of the Law Magazine, or, Quarterly Review of Jurisprudence, which he held from 1828 to 1844, brought him into connection with John Austin, G Cornewall Lewis, and such foreign jurists as Savigny, whose tractate on contemporary legislation and jurisprudence he rendered into English.

In 1833 he travelled abroad, and on his return began contributing to the New Monthly, the Foreign Quarterly, the Quarterly Review and the Edinburgh Review.

In February 1835 he was elected to the Athenaeum Club under Rule II, and he remained for nearly fifty years one of its most conspicuous and most influential members. He was also a subscriber to the Carlton, but ceased to frequent it when he became a Peelite. At the Temple, Hayward, whose reputation was rapidly growing as a connoisseur not only of a bill of fare but also as company, gave recherché dinners, at which ladies of rank and fashion appreciated the wit of Sydney Smith and Theodore Hook, the dignity of Lockhart and Lyndhurst and the oratory of Macaulay. At the Athenaeum and in political society he to some extent succeeded to the position of Croker. He and Macaulay were commonly said to be the two best-read men in town.

Political ladies first, and statesmen afterwards, came to recognise the advantage of obtaining Hayward's good opinion. The "old reviewing hand" became an acknowledged link between society, letters and politics. In one notable and lengthy land rights case, 'The Queen v. Ames', Hayward acted on behalf of the town of Lyme Regis in securing the permanent right of way for its citizens, across the cliffs to Axminster. There were other successes, but his promotion to be Q.C. in 1845 excited a storm of opposition, and, disgusted at being 'black-balled' by J. A. Roebuck and therefore not elected a Bencher of his Inn in the usual course, Hayward virtually withdrew from legal practice. His enemies prevented him from enjoying a well-selected quasisinecure, which both Palmerston and Aberdeen admitted to be his due. Samuel Warren attacked him as Venom Tuft in Ten Thousand a Year; and Disraeli aimed at him partially in Ste Barbe (in Endymion), though the satire here was directed primarily against Thackeray.

As a counsellor of great ladies and of politicians, to whom he held forth with a sense of all-round responsibility surpassing that of a cabinet minister, Hayward retained his influence to the last years of his life. But he had little sympathy with modern ideas. He used to say that he had outlived everyone that he could really look up to. He died, a bachelor, in his rooms at 8 St James's Street (a small museum of autograph portraits and reviewing trophies) and was buried in Highgate Cemetery (east side).

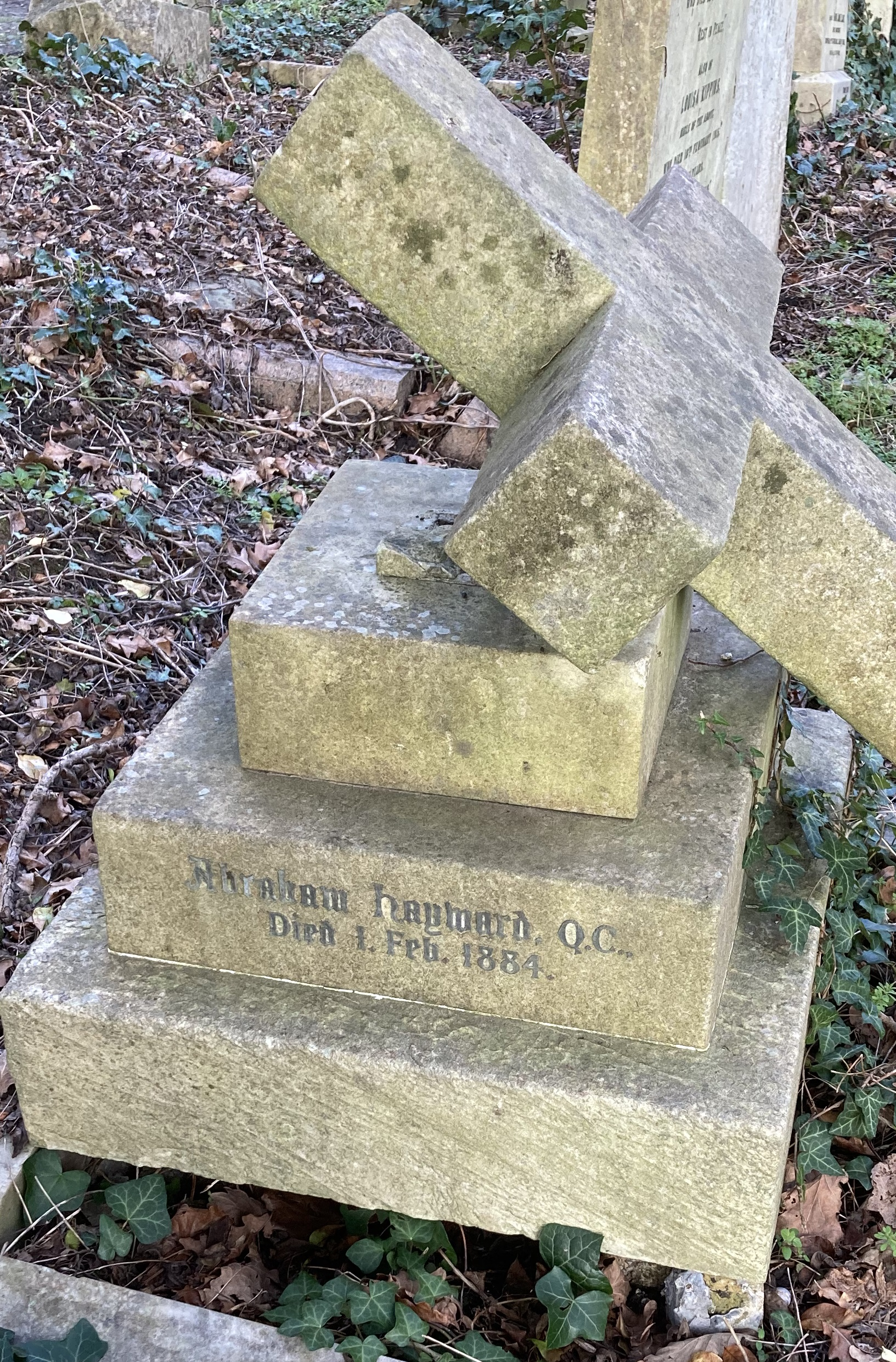
Grave of Abraham Hayward in Highgate Cemetery

== Works ==
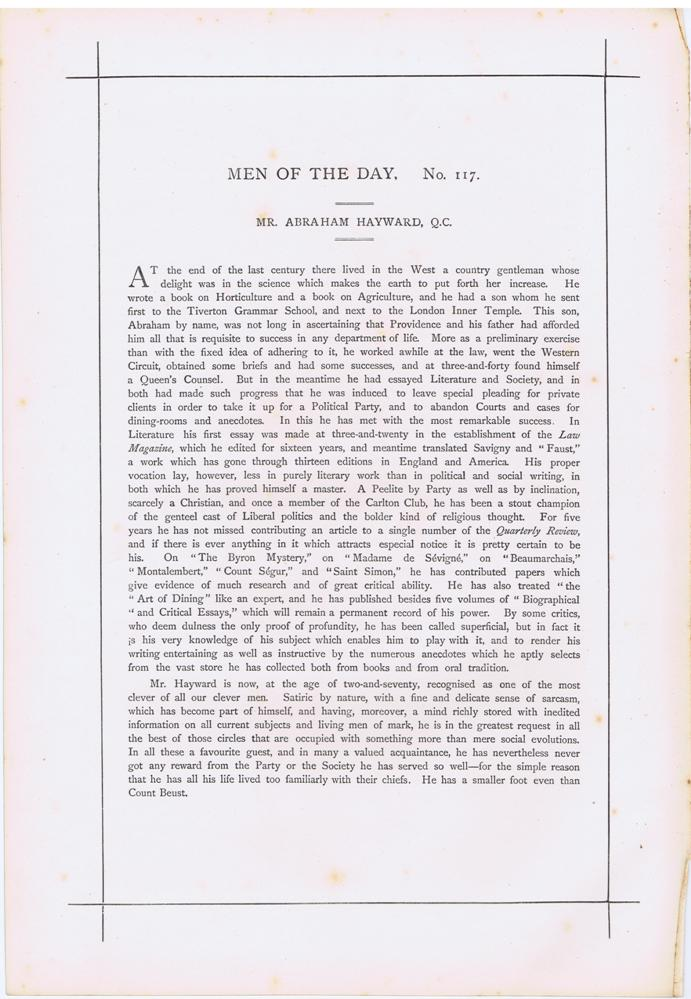
Vanity Fair Text 1875 of Abraham Hayward QC

He printed privately a translation of Goethe's Faust into English prose (pronounced by Carlyle to be the best version extant in his time). A second and revised edition was published after another visit to Germany in January 1834, in the course of which Hayward met Tieck, Chamisso, De La Motte Fouqué, Varnhagen von Ense and Madame Goethe. In 1878 he contributed the volume on Goethe to Blackwood's Foreign Classics for English Readers. The late nineteenth century English author George Gissing who read a lot of German literature in German during his lifetime, thought the volume 'poor stuff'.

His first successes as reviewer were in 1835–1836 by articles on "Walker's Original" and on "Gastronomy." The essays were reprinted to form The Art of Dining, in 1852. Hayward got up every important subject of discussion immediately it came into prominence, and concentrated his information in such a way that he habitually had the last word to say on a topic. When Rogers died, when Vanity Fair was published, when the Greville Memoirs was issued or a revolution occurred on the continent, Hayward, whose memory was as retentive as his power of accumulating documentary evidence was exhaustive, wrote an elaborate essay on the subject for the Quarterly or the Edinburgh. He followed up his paper by giving his acquaintances no rest until they either assimilated or undertook to combat his views.

In February 1848 he became one of the chief leader-writers for the Peelite organ, the Morning Chronicle. The morbid activity of his memory, however, continued to make him many enemies. He alienated Disraeli by tracing a purple patch in his official eulogy of the Duke of Wellington to a newspaper translation from Thiers's funeral panegyric on General St Cyr. His sharp tongue had already made him an enemy of Roebuck, and he disgusted the friends of Mill by the stories he raked up for an obituary notice of the great economist (The Times, 10 May 1873). He broke with Henry Reeve in 1874 by a venomous review of the Greville Memoirs, in which Reeve was compared to the beggarly Scot deputed to let off the blunderbuss which Bolingbroke (Greville) had charged.

After his break with Reeve, Hayward devoted himself more exclusively to the Quarterly. His essays on Chesterfield and Selwyn were reprinted in 1854. Collective editions of his articles appeared in volume form in 1858, 1873 and 1874, and Selected Essays in two volumes, 1878. In his useful but far from flawless edition of the Autobiography, Letters and Literary Remains of Mrs (Thrale) Piozzi (1861), he again appears as a supplementer and continuator of J. W. Croker. His Eminent Statesmen and Writers (1880) commemorates to a large extent personal friendships with such men as Dumas, Cavour and Thiers, whom he knew intimately.

Two volumes of Hayward's Correspondence (edited by HE Carlisle) were published in 1886. In Vanity Fair (27 November 1875) he may be seen as he appeared in later life.
