= My Leopold (1924 film) =

1924 film

- Directed by: Heinrich Bolten-Baeckers
- Written by: Adolphe L'Arronge (play)
- Starring: Arthur Kraußneck; Walter Slezak; Käthe Haack
- Cinematography: Hermann Boettger; Albert Schattmann
- Production company: BB-Film-Fabrikation
- Distributed by: UFA
- Release date: 30 September 1924
- Country: Germany
- Languages: Silent; German intertitles

My Leopold (German: Mein Leopold) is a 1924 German silent comedy film directed by Heinrich Bolten-Baeckers and starring Arthur Kraußneck, Walter Slezak and Käthe Haack. It was the third and last of three film versions the director made of the 1873 play My Leopold.

The film's sets were designed by the art director Erich Czerwonski.

== Cast ==
- Arthur Kraußneck as Gottlieb Weigelt
- Walter Slezak as Leopold, sein Sohn
- Käthe Haack as Klara, seine Tochter
- Georg Alexander as Komponist
- Leo Peukert as Werkführer
- Gustav Botz as Zernikow
- Paula Conrad as Amalie
- Georg John as Nibisch
- Lotte Reinicke as Minna
- Renate Rosner as Marie
- Lotte Steinhoff as Lotte
- Erna Sydow as Demoiselle Andersen

== Bibliography ==
- Grange, William. Cultural Chronicle of the Weimar Republic. Scarecrow Press, 2008.
