= My Leopold (1955 film) =

1955 film directed by Géza von Bolváry

- Directed by: Géza von Bolváry
- Written by: Adolphe L'Arronge (play) Eberhard Keindorff; Johanna Sibelius
- Starring: Paul Hörbiger; Peer Schmidt; Ingeborg Körner
- Cinematography: Herbert Körner
- Edited by: Ingrid Wacker
- Music by: Gerhard Winkler
- Production companies: Berolina Film; Melodie Film
- Distributed by: Constantin Film
- Release date: 23 September 1955
- Running time: 98 minutes
- Country: West Germany
- Language: German

My Leopold (German: Mein Leopold) is a 1955 West German comedy film directed by Géza von Bolváry and starring Paul Hörbiger, Peer Schmidt, and Ingeborg Körner. It is based on Adolphe L'Arronge's 1873 play of the same name which has been turned into a number of films. It was shot at the Tempelhof Studios in West Berlin. The film's sets were designed by the art director Hans Kuhnert.

== Cast ==
- Paul Hörbiger as Gottlieb Weigelt
- Peer Schmidt as Leopold, sein Sohn
- Ingeborg Körner as Klara, seine Tochter
- Paul Klinger as Rudolf Starke
- Grethe Weiser as Minna
- Peter Garden as Klaus Mehlmeyer
- Karl Ludwig Diehl as Schwalbach, Banker
- Doris Kirchner as Lore, seine Tochter
- Wolfgang Neuss as Charly
- Gardy Granass as Maria
- Barbara Rost as Charlotte
- Rita Paul as Marion De Lorme, Sängerin
- Heidi Becker
- Wolfgang Condrus as Fritz
- Carl de Vogt
- Lia Eibenschütz as Frau Zernikow
- Asgarda Hummel
- Rolf Menke
- Willi Rose
- Harald Sawade
- Kurt Vespermann as Zernikow

== Bibliography ==
- Goble, Alan (1999). The Complete Index to Literary Sources in Film. Berlin: Walter de Gruyter. ISBN 978-3-11-095194-3.
