= Hasemann's Daughters (film) =

1920 film

- Directed by: Heinrich Bolten-Baeckers
- Written by: Adolphe L'Arronge (play); Heinrich Bolten-Baeckers
- Produced by: Heinrich Bolten-Baeckers
- Starring: Leo Peukert
- Cinematography: Albert Schattmann
- Production company: BB-Film-Fabrikation
- Release date: 1920
- Country: Germany
- Languages: Silent; German intertitles

Hasemann's Daughters (German:Hasemanns Töchter) is a 1920 German silent film directed by Heinrich Bolten-Baeckers and starring Leo Peukert. It is an adaptation of Adolphe L'Arronge's 1877 play of the same title.

== Cast ==
- Conrad Dreher
- Sabine Impekoven
- Leo Peukert

== Bibliography ==
- Hans-Michael Bock & Michael Töteberg. Das Ufa-Buch. Zweitausendeins, 1992.
