= My Leopold (1914 film) =

1914 film

- Directed by: Heinrich Bolten-Baeckers
- Written by: Adolphe L'Arronge (play); Heinrich Bolten-Baeckers
- Starring: Felix Basch
- Cinematography: Hermann Schadock
- Production company: Targa-Film
- Release date: January 1914
- Country: Germany
- Languages: Silent; German intertitles

My Leopold (German:Mein Leopold) is a 1914 German silent comedy film directed by Heinrich Bolten-Baeckers and starring Felix Basch, Lotte Erol and Richard Georg. It was the first of three silent film adaptations Bolten-Baeckers made of the 1873 play of the same name by Adolphe L'Arronge.

== Cast ==
In alphabetical order

- Felix Basch
- Lotte Erol
- Richard Georg
- Erich Kämmerer
- Paula Levermann
- Leo Peukert

== Bibliography ==
- Kay Weniger. 'Es wird im Leben dir mehr genommen als gegeben ...' Lexikon der aus Deutschland und ™sterreich emigrierten Filmschaffenden 1933 bis 1945: Eine Gesamt bersicht. ACABUS Verlag, 2011.
