= Hasemann's Daughters =

Hasemann's Daughters (German:Hasemanns Töchter) is an 1877 play by the German writer Adolphe L'Arronge. It was loosely based on an earlier French work.

In 1920 it was adapted into the silent film Hasemann's Daughters directed by Heinrich Bolten-Baeckers.

== Bibliography ==
- Grange, William. Historical Dictionary of German Theater. Rowman & Littlefield, 2015.
