= My Leopold (1931 film) =

1931 film

- Directed by: Hans Steinhoff
- Written by: Hans Brennert
- Based on: My Leopold by Adolphe L'Arronge
- Produced by: Franz Tappers; Helmut Eweler
- Starring: Max Adalbert; Harald Paulsen; Camilla Spira
- Cinematography: Willy Goldberger
- Edited by: Kurt Bleines
- Music by: Leo Ascher
- Production companies: Majestic-Film GmbH; Orplid-Film
- Distributed by: Messtro-Film
- Release date: 18 December 1931
- Running time: 100 minutes
- Country: Germany
- Language: German

My Leopold (German: Mein Leopold) is a 1931 German comedy drama film directed by Hans Steinhoff and starring Max Adalbert, Harald Paulsen and Camilla Spira. It is based on Adolphe L'Arronge's 1873 play My Leopold which had previously been adapted into silent films on three occasions. It was shot at the Halensee Studios in Berlin. The film's sets were designed by the art director Franz Schroedter.

== Synopsis ==
Gottlieb Weigelt, a wealthy and indulgent father, is driven into financial ruin and social disgrace by the reckless spending and mounting debts of his spoiled son Leopold. After the family business collapses and the elder Weigelt is reduced to working as a cobbler, a shamed Leopold flees to Hamburg to rebuild his life from scratch. Over several years, the young man undergoes a moral transformation, rising from a factory worker to a successful and hardworking partner in a new company. The story concludes with a sentimental reconciliation between the now-humbled father and his redeemed son, finally reuniting the fractured family.

== Cast ==
- Max Adalbert as Gottlieb Weigelt
- Harald Paulsen as Leopold
- Camilla Spira as Klara, seine Tochter
- Gustav Fröhlich as Rudolf Starke
- Paul Henckels as Zernickow
- Ida Wüst as Natalie
- Lucie Englisch as Emma
- Elfriede Borodin as Marie
- Hermann Thimig as Mehlmeyer
- Vicky Werckmeister as Minna, Dienstmädchen
- Hilde Hildebrand as Rosita
- Alfred Beierle as Mielisch
- Rolf Drucker as Gottlieb
- Eugen Burg
- Gerhard Dammann
- Aenne Goerling
- Kurt Lilien
- Anna Müller-Lincke
- Heinz Sarnow
- Gyula Szőreghy

== Bibliography ==
- Bock, Hans-Michael; Bergfelder, Tim, eds. (2009). The Concise Cinegraph: Encyclopaedia of German Cinema. New York: Berghahn Books. ISBN 978-1-57181-655-9.
