= My Leopold (1919 film) =

1919 film

- Directed by: Heinrich Bolten-Baeckers
- Written by: Adolphe L'Arronge (play); Heinrich Bolten-Baeckers
- Produced by: Heinrich Bolten-Baeckers
- Starring: Leo Peukert
- Production company: BB-Film-Fabrikation Bolten-Baeckes
- Distributed by: BB-Film-Fabrikation Bolten-Baeckes
- Release date: August 1919
- Country: Germany
- Languages: Silent; German intertitles

My Leopold (German: Mein Leopold) is a 1919 German silent comedy film directed by Heinrich Bolten-Baeckers and starring Leo Peukert. It is based on the 1873 play My Leopold.

== Cast ==
In alphabetical order

- Leona Bergere as Frau Zernikow
- Conrad Dreher as August Weigelt, Schuhwarenfabrikant
- Sabine Impekoven as Klara
- Fritz Lion as Amtsrichter Zernikow
- Richard Ludwig as Leopold
- Annemarie Mörike as Marie
- Melita Petri as Emma
- Leo Peukert as Starke, Geschäftsführer
- Otto Treptow as Mehlmeyer, Komponist

== Bibliography ==
- Hans-Michael Bock and Tim Bergfelder. The Concise Cinegraph: An Encyclopedia of German Cinema. Berghahn Books.
