= Marko Pantelić (baritone) =

Serbian opera singer

- Born: Marko Pantelić; Belgrade, Serbia
- Genre: Opera
- Occupation: Opera singer
- Member of: Theater Magdeburg
- Website: www.markopantelic.com

Marko Pantelić is a Serbian opera singer (a baritone) who has built a notable career in his native Serbia and, increasingly, on the international opera stage, particularly in Germany. His vocal fach is lyric baritone, and he is currently a member of the ensemble at Theater Magdeburg in Germany.

== Biography ==
=== Education ===
Born in Belgrade, Serbia, Marko Pantelić initially began studying viola at the Academy of Arts in Novi Sad. This early instrumental phase provided him with a thorough musical foundation. He later dedicated himself to vocal studies, continuing his musical training at the "Kosta Manojlović" Music School in Zemun, in the class of Professor Nenad Nenić. He also gained early performance experience on the Novi Sad arts scene; a concert held at the Multimedia Centre of the Academy of Arts in Novi Sad on April 23, 2012, where he performed works by Dvořák, Glinka, Benda, and Tchaikovsky, attests to his early performances.

He continued his studies at the Faculty of Music Arts in Belgrade, in the class of baritone Professor Nikola Mijailović. During his studies, he received awards from the Faculty as the "best and most promising student of the Solo Singing Department". He gained practical experience in the Opera Studio of the National Theatre in Belgrade.

He pursued further international training at the International Vocal Arts Institute (IVAI) in New York and the Canadian Vocal Arts Institute (CVAI) in Montreal. He attended masterclasses with world-renowned artists and pedagogues such as Ruth Falcon, Mignon Dunn, Brigitte Fassbaender, Sherrill Milnes, David Bižić, Djordje Nešić, and Dieter Schweikard.

=== Career ===
After completing his education, Pantelić began his professional career performing at the National Theatre in Belgrade, the Serbian National Theatre in Novi Sad, and the National Theatre in Sarajevo. One of his roles during this period was Fléville in Umberto Giordano's opera Andrea Chénier at the National Theatre in Belgrade.

A significant step in his career was his move to the German opera scene, where he performed at the Staatstheater Nürnberg, Theater Regensburg, Theater Altenburg Gera, and Staatstheater Mainz. Since 2019, he has been a permanent member of the ensemble at Theater Magdeburg. He has also made guest appearances with other ensembles, including the Romanian National Opera in Timișoara and Theater Winterthur.

== Artistic work ==
=== Operatic roles ===
Pantelić's operatic repertoire includes around 30 roles. Among his most significant roles are:

- Dandini in Rossini's La Cenerentola
- Belcore in Donizetti's L'elisir d'amore
- Ford in Verdi's Falstaff
- Marcello in Puccini's La bohème
- Title role in Tchaikovsky's Eugene Onegin
- Count Almaviva in Mozart's The Marriage of Figaro (Le nozze di Figaro)
- Gerdt Minde in Eugen Engel's opera Grete Minde at Theater Magdeburg
- Olibrius in Telemann's opera Sieg der Schönheit (The Victory of Beauty) at Theater Magdeburg
- Fléville in Giordano's Andrea Chénier
- Father (Peter Besenbinder) in Humperdinck's Hänsel und Gretel
- Ned Keene in Britten's Peter Grimes at Staatstheater Nürnberg * Tsarevich Afron in Rimsky-Korsakov's The Golden Cockerel (Der goldene Hahn)
- Music Master in Strauss's Ariadne auf Naxos

=== Concert repertoire ===
In addition to operatic performances, Pantelić maintains a concert repertoire, which includes performances of Haydn's Requiem, Duruflé's Requiem and Mass Cum Jubilo, Schumann's song cycle Dichterliebe, Mahler's Lieder eines fahrenden Gesellen and Kindertotenlieder, as well as Dvořák's Biblical Songs (Biblické písně). He has collaborated with the RTS Symphony Choir, the Belgrade Philharmonic Orchestra, Musikkollegium Winterthur, and the Magdeburg Philharmonic Orchestra.

== Awards and recognitions ==
Marko Pantelić has received several awards and recognitions:

- Awards from the Fund for Young Talents of the Republic of Serbia
- Awards from the Faculty of Music Arts in Belgrade as the best and most promising student of the Solo Singing Department
- "FMU AND GUARNERIUS AWARD" (October 23, 2018), with a concert accompanied by pianist Milica Ilić
- Promotional award for young artists from the Theater Magdeburg Promotion Association (Förderverein Theater Magdeburg)
- Scholarship from the Richard Wagner Association in Magdeburg for the Bayreuth Festival

== Recordings ==
Pantelić's work has been featured on commercial CD releases:

Discography of Marko Pantelić
Opera Title	Composer	Role	Orchestra/Ensemble	Conductor	Record label	Year of release
Grete Minde	Eugen Engel	Gerdt Minde	Magdeburg Philharmonic, Theater Magdeburg Choir	Anna Skryleva	Orfeo Records (C260352)	2023
Sieg der Schönheit (The Victory of Beauty)	Georg Philipp Telemann	Olibrius	Akademie für Alte Musik Berlin	Michael Hofstetter		

He maintains an official website (markopantelic.com) and is active on platforms like Operabase. His visual identity and digital presentation were developed by a team including General Condition, photographer Miša Obradović, and creative director Jovan Lakić.

== Critical reception ==
The world premiere of Eugen Engel's opera Grete Minde at Theater Magdeburg, where Pantelić performed the role of Gerdt Minde, attracted significant international attention. The British newspaper The Guardian stated in an article on February 13, 2022, that the premiere was "lushly brought" to the stage. This production, whose composer was a victim of the Holocaust, was also released as a live recording on CD by Orfeo.

Pantelić was a guest on the show "Susretanja" ("Encounters") on Radio Belgrade 1 (June 2023), where he discussed his career and art.

== Future engagements ==
For the 2024/2025 season at Theater Magdeburg, roles announced include Harašta in Janáček's opera The Cunning Little Vixen, Dancaïre in Bizet's Carmen, Ping in Puccini's Turandot, as well as a performance as the bass soloist in Beethoven's Ninth Symphony. Performances as Baron Douphol in Verdi's La traviata at Theater Magdeburg (May–June 2025) and as Agamemnon in Offenbach's La belle Hélène at Staatstheater Mainz (April–June 2025) have also been announced.
