= Dancing Vienna =

1927 German film

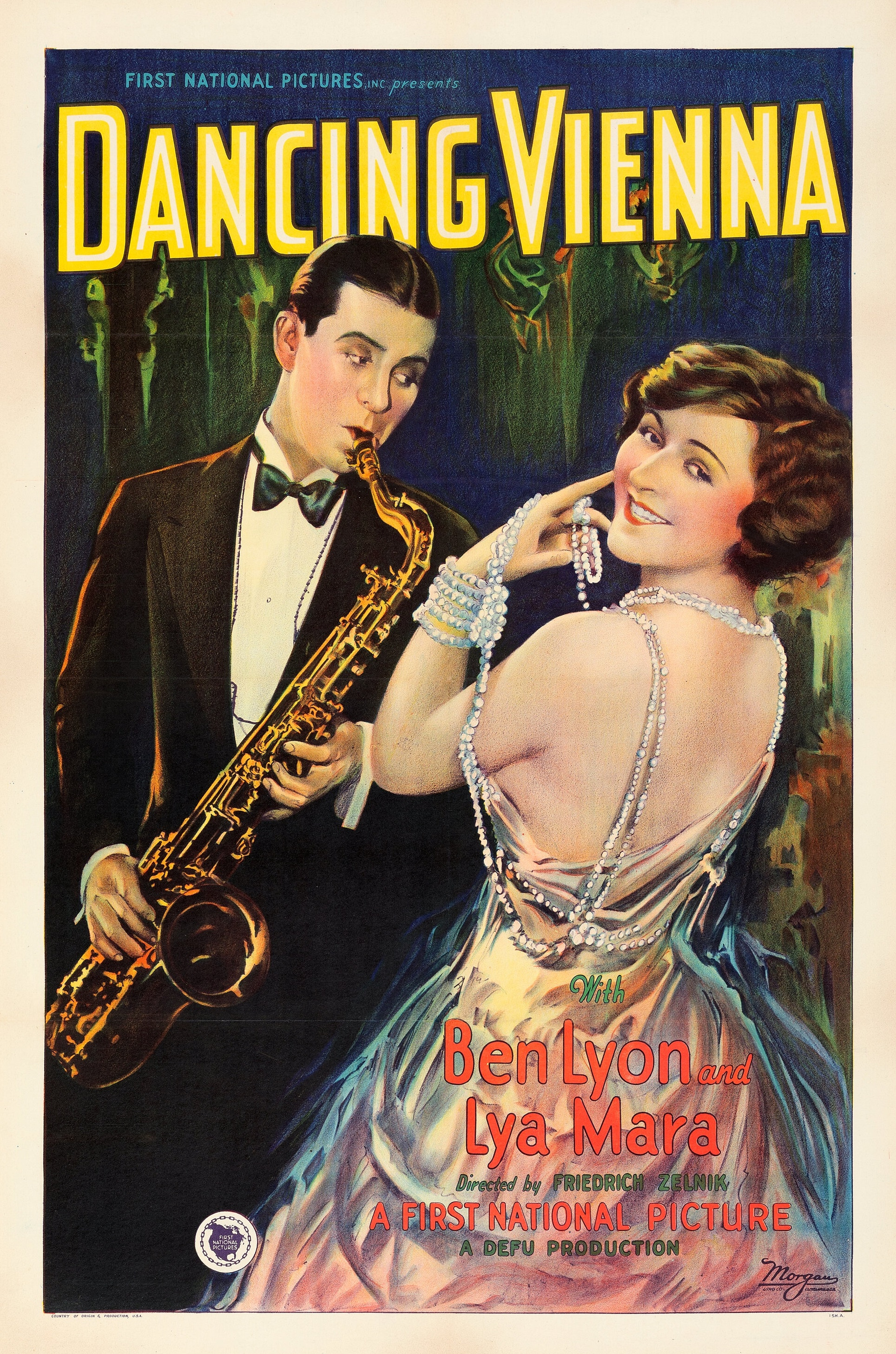
- Alfred Abel and Lya Mara in an advertising poster for the film.
- German: Das tanzende Wien
- Directed by: Frederic Zelnik
- Written by: Fanny Carlsen; Willy Haas
- Produced by: Frederic Zelnik
- Starring: Lya Mara; Ben Lyon; Alfred Abel; Eugen Burg
- Cinematography: Frederik Fuglsang
- Music by: Willy Schmidt-Gentner
- Production company: Deutsche Fox
- Distributed by: First National Pictures (through Warner Bros. Pictures)
- Release date: 1 October 1927 (Germany)
- Running time: 108 minutes
- Country: Germany
- Languages: Silent; German Intertitles; Sound (Synchronized); English Intertitles

Dancing Vienna (German: Das tanzende Wien) is a 1927 German silent and synchronized sound comedy film directed by Frederic Zelnik and starring Ben Lyon, Lya Mara and Alfred Abel. The film was produced by Defu Company of Berlin, an American production unit associated with First National Pictures, Inc. A sound version was also prepared in 1928 by First National Pictures for release in the United States and this version was the one was seen by most audiences. This sound version went into general release on January 13, 1929. While the sound version has no audible dialog, it featured a synchronized musical score with sound effects using the sound-on-disc Vitaphone process.

The film's art direction was by Andrej Andrejew, Ferdinand Bellan and Erich Kettelhut. It was shot at the Staaken Studios in Berlin and on location in Vienna. It was one of several prototypes of the Heimatfilm made by Zelnik in the 1920s. The film was intended as a loose sequel to Zelnik's The Blue Danube (1926).

== Plot ==
In romantic old Vienna, a gentle poet stumbles upon a charming scene in the park: a young woman fiercely protecting a stray dog from a cruel street boy. This girl is Komtesse Fritzi Zirsky, the orphaned daughter of the noble Count Oscar Zirsky and Mizzi, a once-celebrated cabaret singer. Their marriage had scandalized Viennese society and was never accepted by Oscar’s stern and tradition-bound parents, Count Zirsky and Gräfin Zirsky, with whom Fritzi now lives in a once-grand house fallen into genteel poverty.

Treated coldly by her grandparents and constantly reminded of her mother’s cabaret past, Fritzi threatens to leave the suffocating household. When the mansion next door, belonging to their estranged cousins—the Konzaga family—is put up for sale, the Countess rejoices, having long despised that side of the family. Decades earlier, she had orchestrated the disgrace and exile of the youngest Konzaga son, Carl Konzaga.

Far away in New York, Carl has rebuilt his life and become a wealthy newspaper magnate. His son, Johnny Konzaga, is a modern jazz-loving young man whose musical tastes and brash American ways irritate his father. Carl sends Johnny back to Vienna with orders to repurchase the family home—but strictly forbids him from having anything to do with the Zirskys, whom he still bitterly resents.

But fate intervenes. In Vienna, Johnny meets and promptly falls in love with the beautiful Fritzi, unaware at first of her identity. When he learns the truth, he chooses love over loyalty, and—encouraged by the friendly poet—takes Fritzi to visit a cabaret where her mother once starred. Moved by the faded glory of the venue and its aging proprietor, the trio hatches a plan to host a gala benefit performance to revive the old place and its fortunes.

Hearing of Johnny’s involvement with Fritzi, Carl Konzaga rushes to Vienna to put an end to the romance. In a cruel attempt to humiliate Fritzi, who is to dance in the gala, he secretly buys every seat in the theater but uses only two—ensuring a sea of empty chairs. Undeterred, Fritzi dances anyway, encouraged by Johnny and the poet. Against all odds, the performance is a triumph. Critics rave, and Fritzi wins not only applause but the public’s heart.

Old Count Zirsky, reading the glowing reviews, finally sees value in his granddaughter’s talent and independence. But tension erupts when Carl demands Johnny return to America immediately, and Fritzi—devastated—parts from him after a quarrel.

Fritzi is cast as the star of the poet’s new revue, "Dancing Vienna." Before opening night, Carl Konzaga offers her a check to renounce Johnny forever. She refuses, proud and resolute. Meanwhile, Johnny, boarding the ship for New York, discovers the scheme his father played. In a breathless climax, he rushes back to shore just as the boat departs.

Fritzi’s performance is a sensation. The revue is a massive personal success, crowned by Johnny’s surprise appearance on stage, where he joins her for a classic Viennese waltz—a symbolic victory of tradition and love over modern cynicism and jazz. The old Count and Countess Zirsky and Carl Konzaga, softened by the romance and success of the young couple, lay aside their decades-old feud.

The curtain falls on a picture of reconciliation and happiness, with Vienna dancing once again.

== Cast ==
- Lya Mara as Komtesse Frizzi Zirsky
- Ben Lyon as Jonny Conzaga
- Alfred Abel as Dichter
- Eugen Burg as Kaiser Franz Josef
- Albert Paulig as Kaiser's adjutant
- Julius Falkenstein as Count Zirsky
- Gustav Charle as Konstantin, Zirsky's servant
- Arthur Kraußneck as Wirt vom 'Eisvogel'
- Kurt Gerron as Ein Feuerwehrmann
- Hermann Picha as Ein Musiker
- Hans Wassmann as Petrus
- Andreas van Horn as Johann Strauß
- Olga Engl as Gräfin Zirsky
- Arnold Korff as Carl Conzaga
- Georg Burghardt as Conzaga's secretary
- Gyula Szőreghy

== Music ==
Nathaniel Shilkret (assisted by Bruno Reibold) directed the Victor recording orchestra for the synchronized sound version.
