= Leo Peukert =

German actor (1885–1944)

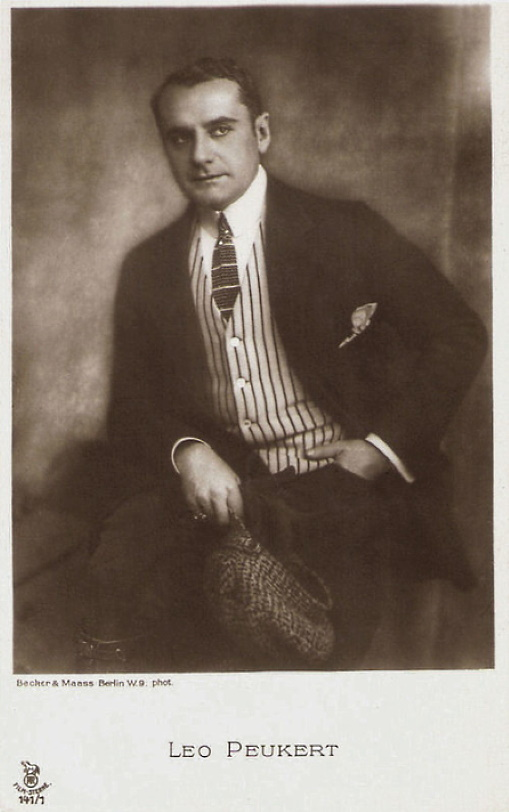
- Born: Leonhard Peukert; 26 August 1885; Munich, Bavaria; German Empire
- Died: 6 January 1944 (aged 58); Waldshut-Tiengen; Nazi Germany
- Resting place: Munich Waldfriedhof
- Occupation: Actor
- Years active: 1904–1944
- Spouse: Sabine Impekoven (m. 1914)

Leonhard "Leo" Peukert (26 August 1885 – 6 January 1944) was a prolific German film actor and film director, appearing in more than a hundred and fifty productions between 1910 and his death in 1944. While occasionally he played a leading role in his early years, such as the comedy The Happy Journey (1924), he mostly appeared as a character actor. Peukert was also a film director, making eleven short and feature films during the silent era.

He was married to the actress Sabine Impekoven who appeared with him in several silent films.

== Selected filmography ==
- Poor Jenny (1912)
- My Leopold (1914)
- My Leopold (1919)
- The Love of Marion Bach (1919)
- King Krause (1919)
- Hasemann's Daughters (1920)
- The Journey to Happiness (1923)
- My Leopold (1924)
- The Happy Journey (1924)
- The Second Mother (1925)
- Radio Magic (1927)
- Two Under the Stars (1927)
- I Stand in the Dark Midnight (1927)
- Mikosch Comes In (1928)
- Autumn on the Rhine (1928)
- Escape from Hell (1928)
- A Better Master (1928)
- Almenrausch and Edelweiss (1928)
- Beware of Loose Women (1929)
- The Midnight Waltz (1929)
- The Lord of the Tax Office (1929)
- I Once Had a Beautiful Homeland (1928)
- The Convict from Istanbul (1929)
- Scandal in Baden-Baden (1929)
- Three Days Confined to Barracks (1930)
- Kohlhiesel's Daughters (1930)
- The Son of the White Mountain (1930)
- Moritz Makes his Fortune (1931)
- My Friend the Millionaire (1932)
- Spies at the Savoy Hotel (1932)
- The Tsar's Diamond (1932)
- The Testament of Cornelius Gulden (1932)
- Happy Days in Aranjuez (1933)
- A Woman Who Knows What She Wants (1934)
- At the Strasbourg (1934)
- Gypsy Blood (1934)
- The Four Musketeers (1934)
- All Because of the Dog (1935)
- Paul and Pauline (1936)
- Orders Are Orders (1936)
- Diamonds (1937)
- My Son the Minister (1937)
- Gordian the Tyrant (1937)
- Meiseken (1937)
- The Vagabonds (1937)
- Between the Parents (1938)
- The Roundabouts of Handsome Karl (1938)
- The Secret Lie (1938)
- The Deruga Case (1938)
- A Hopeless Case (1939)
- Central Rio (1939)
- The Sensational Casilla Trial (1939)
- Hotel Sacher (1939)
- The Scoundrel (1939)
- My Aunt, Your Aunt (1939)
- Kora Terry (1940)
- Between Hamburg and Haiti (1940)
- Counterfeiters (1940)
- Left of the Isar, Right of the Spree (1940)
- Mistress Moon (1941)
- The Way to Freedom (1941)
- Thrice Wed (1941)
- Women Are Better Diplomats (1941)
- Quax the Crash Pilot (1941)
- Doctor Crippen (1942)
- Diesel (1942)
- The Night in Venice (1942)
- The Old Boss (1942)
- The Thing About Styx (1942)
- Mask in Blue (1943)
- Back Then (1943)
- My Summer Companion (1943)
- Beloved Darling (1943)
- Light of Heart (1943)
- Romance in a Minor Key (1943)
- Kohlhiesel's Daughters (1943)
- Tonelli (1943)

== Bibliography ==
- Grange, William. Cultural Chronicle of the Weimar Republic. Scarecrow Press, 2008.
