= King Krause =

1919 film

- Directed by: Heinrich Bolten-Baeckers
- Written by: Louis Hermann (novel); Julius Keller (novel)
- Produced by: Heinrich Bolten-Baeckers
- Starring: Leo Peukert; Sabine Impekoven
- Cinematography: Hermann Boettger
- Production company: BB-Film-Fabrikation
- Distributed by: UFA
- Release date: 1 August 1919
- Country: Germany
- Languages: Silent; German intertitles

King Krause (German: König Krause) is a 1919 German silent comedy film directed by Heinrich Bolten-Baeckers.

== Cast ==
In alphabetical order

- Conrad Dreher
- Grete Flohr
- Sabine Impekoven
- Fritz Lion
- Richard Ludwig
- Annemarie Mörike
- Melita Petri
- Leo Peukert
- Hans Stock

== Bibliography ==
- Hans-Michael Bock, Michael Töteberg (ed.): Das Ufa-Buch. Zweitausendeins, Frankfurt 1992.
