= Grete Minde =

1880 novella by Theodor Fontane

Grete Minde is an 1880 German novella by Theodor Fontane. It was initially published in the magazine Nord und Süd in 1879.

It is partly based on the case of Margarete von Minden who in 1617 allegedly took revenge on corrupt officials in Tangermünde by setting fire to the town. In 1619, she confessed under torture, and was dismembered and burned at the stake.

Works based on the novel include:

- Grete Minde (film), 1977 German film
- Grete Minde (opera), German opera by Eugen Engel
