= Children's Reformatory =

1907 French silent short film

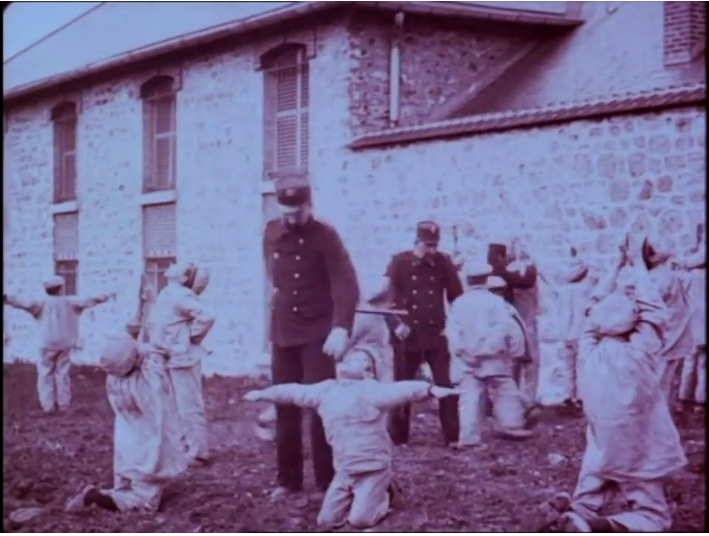
- French: Le bagne des gosses
- Directed by: Charles Decroix
- Written by: Aristide Bruant
- Starring: Briand
- Production company: Pathé Frères
- Distributed by: Pathé Frères
- Release date: 1907
- Running time: 11 minutes
- Country: France

Children's Reformatory (French: Le bagne des gosses) is a 1907 French silent short film directed by Charles Decroix, inspired by the eponymous novel by Aristide Bruant.

== Plot ==
A young orphan is thrown out into the street by a ruthless janitor after the death of his mother. He wanders pitifully through the streets, soliciting in vain the charity of the passers-by. Driven by need, he grabs a loaf of bread from a bakery and runs away. Caught in the act of vagrancy and theft, he is sent to a penitentiary where he leads the hard life of convicts. He manages to escape and hides in a doghouse where he eats the dog's food but is soon recaptured. However, an old philanthropist takes an interest in him. He educates him and allows him to escape from definitive misery.

== Production and release ==
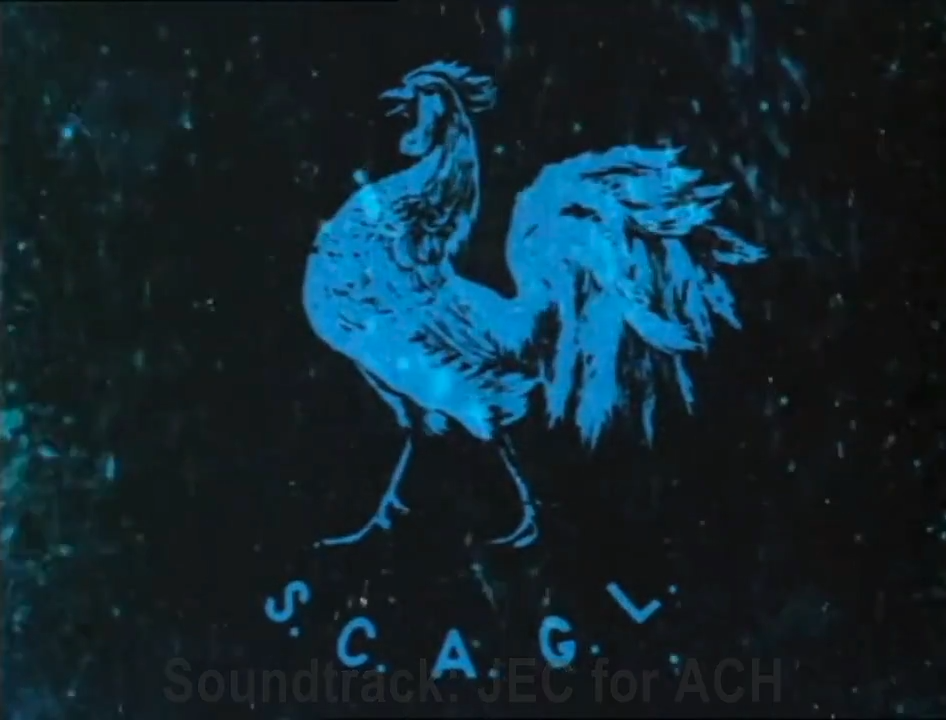
SGACL logo

This film was produced by the SCAGL (Société cinématographique des auteurs et gens de lettres [Cinematographic Society of Authors and Writers]), a company created in order to widen the audience of the cinema towards more cultivated and more affluent layers of the population, with the film adaptation of classics of popular literature. This is the case with this film loosely based on the eponymous novel by Aristide Bruant. Charles Pathé was a shareholder and director of the SCAGL, for which he built new state-of-the-art studios on land adjacent to his factory in Vincennes. The film was distributed by Pathé Frères in the 8th series of its Scènes dramatiques et réalistes [Dramatic and realistic scenes], which often related the adventures of poor children, sometimes with a happy end. It was directed by Charles Decroix, a French actor, director, producer and screenwriter, who directed around 50 films in France and Germany between 1907 and 1922.

The film was released on 26 July 1907 in Lyon (France), and on 31 August 1907 in the United States.

== Analysis ==
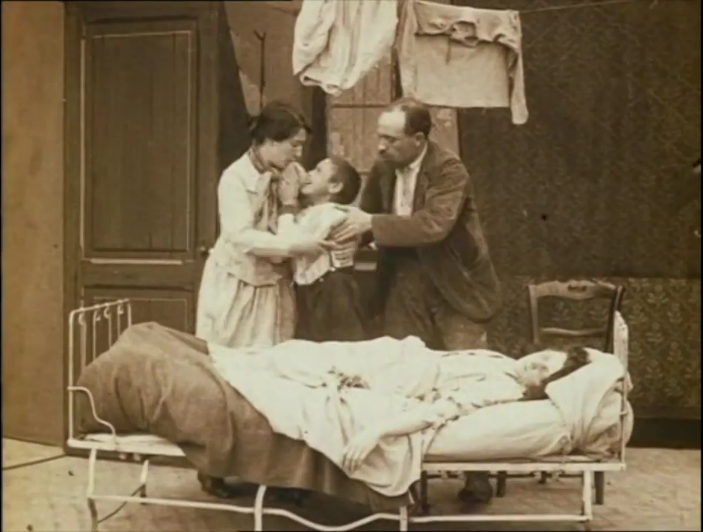
Shot 1

The film is composed of nine multishot scenes introduced by intertitles, including a total of 30 shots. Most of the shotsweare filmed on location in a forest and at military premises, and four were shot on studio sets. All are wide shots or full shots, with the exception of two medium shots. Despite the fact that all shots were taken with a fixed camera, the short duration of the shots and the continuity editing, notably during the chase scenes (shots 5 to 12 and 19 to 25), gives it great dynamism while the natural acting and the on-location filming gives it realism.

I. The orphan. 1. view of a poor bedroom with the mother dying in her bed attended by her son. When she dies the boy fetches a man and a woman.

II. Cast onto the streets. 2. The facade of a house. The boy is kicked out of the house.

III. Sleeping under the open sky. 3. The boy leaning on a tree by a river. 4. A street in a village with the closed gate of a park. The boy asks money from a couple of passers-by who ignore him.

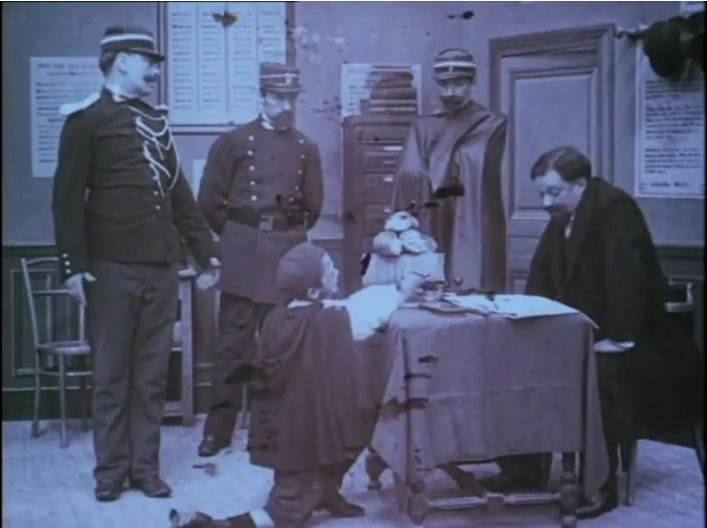
Shot 11

IV. The theft. 5. The facade of a baker: the orphan steals a bread and runs away with it, the baker runs after him. 6. A clearing in a forest; the boy seats down to eat his bread while a man walks by. 7. A lane in a forest; the baker comes running in, meets the man seen in 6 who points to where he saw the boy. 8. Same as 6. The boy is still eating sitting down. The baker grabs him and drags him away. 9. A path at the edge of a forest. The man still holding the boy meets two gendarmes. After a brief talk they all exit left. 10. A street with a police station. The three men and the boy enter right and go inside the police station. 11.The commissioner's office. The three men and the boy enter right. The baker explains the case and leaves. The boy kneels down to beg the commissioner who waves him away and he is dragged out by the two gendarmes. 12. Same as 10. The two gendarmes and the boy come out of the police station and exit right.

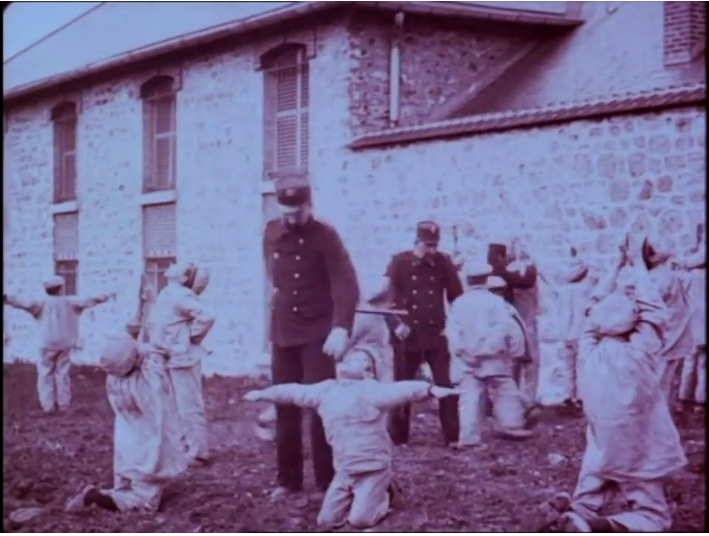
Shot 17

V. The reformatory. 13. The facade of a building with the inscription Colonie Pénitenciaire [Penitentiary Colony]. The two gendarmes and the boy enter left, a sentry open the gate and they go inside. 14. The registrar's office. The two gendarmes and the boy enter right, the registrar writes opn his registry and two guards drag the boy out left. 15. The gate of a military building. A couple of guards escort a gang of children in convict attire. They all exit left. 16. A field surrounded by trees. The children work under the custody of guards. 17. The facade of a military building. A group of children is punished by guards. 18. A prison cell. The boy is sitting on a stool. He sees an apparition of his mother (double exposure). A boy comes in with a guard and gives him discreetly a piece of bread.

VI. The escape. 19. A clearing on a hillside. A group of convict children are digging the earth under the custody of guards. The orphan whispers something in the ear of one of the children and rapidly exits left. After a while the guards notice his absence. Two guards run after him while the other guards round up the children and march them uphill. 20. Another view of the forest. The guards herd the children downhill. 21. A breach in a wall. The orphan jumps over the breach and runs out to the right pursued by two guards. 22 to 24. The chase continues over a trench in the forest, along some fortifications and in the street of a village.

VII. Medor's hideout. 25. A farm courtyard. The orphan comes running in and hides in the dog house where a dog is lying. The guards come after him look around and leave the farm. 26. Inside the doghouse. Medium shot of the orphan eating the dog's food while the dog is looking at him. 27. A garden in front of a house. The orphan enters right and lie down on a bench. Two guards enter him and catch him. A well-dressed gentleman gives his card to the guards and convince them to leave the boy with him.

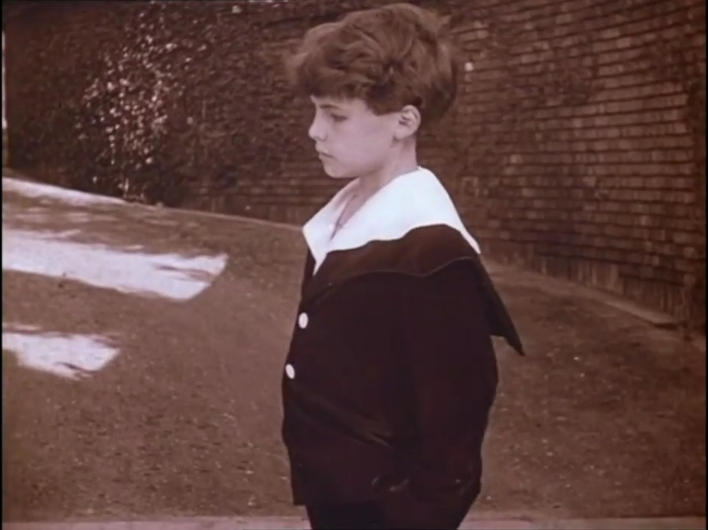
Shot 30

VIII. Tutor him. 28. A well-furnished parlour. The boy is sitting at a table, working. The gentleman enters and hugs him. The boy continues his work while the gentleman reads his newspaper.

IX. One year later. 29. Full shot sideways of the boy is standing in front of the gate of a house in an elegant suit. 30. Medium shot of the boy. The film concludes with the Pathé logo of a rooster with the initials SCAGL."

Alison Griffiths notes that the film shows that "the Auburn system of congregant labor by day and isolation in the single cell by night [was] in effect in the French "maison de correction"" and controversially considers that there is "an obvious comic element to seeing eight- to fourteen-year-old boys, as opposed to adult men, dressed in prison stripes performing hard labor." She also remarks that "the image of children being subjected to punishments that hardly match their crime raises the question of the potential bad taste of such a film." In this respect, Richard Abel discusses the censorship problems met by the film in the US.

== Cast ==
- Briand as the orphan boy
