= Doctor Klaus =

1920 film

- Directed by: Heinrich Bolten-Baeckers
- Written by: Herma Kristof-Stock
- Produced by: Heinrich Bolten-Baeckers
- Starring: Conrad Dreher; Sabine Impekoven
- Production company: BB-Film-Fabrikation
- Distributed by: UFA
- Release date: August 1920
- Country: Germany
- Languages: Silent; German intertitles

Doctor Klaus (German: Doktor Klaus) is a 1920 German silent comedy film directed by Heinrich Bolten-Baeckers and starring Conrad Dreher.

== Cast ==
In alphabetical order

- Leona Bergere as Marie
- Conrad Dreher as Lubowski
- Grete Flohr as Haushälterin Marianne
- Sabine Impekoven as Klementine
- Lisl Kehm as Julie
- Carl Heinz Klubertanz as Referendar Gerstel
- Erich Kämmerer as Bauer
- Richard Ludwig as Max von Boden
- Gertrud Rottenberg as Emma
- Gustav Rudolph as Dr. Klaus
- Hans Stock as Juwelier Leopold Grisinger
- Vilma von Mayburg as Frau von Schlingen

== Bibliography ==
- Hans-Michael Bock, Michael Töteberg (ed.): Das Ufa-Buch. Zweitausendeins, Frankfurt 1992.
