= Arthur Kraußneck =

German actor

- Born: 9 April 1856; Ballethen, Province of Prussia
- Died: 21 April 1941 (aged 85); Berlin, Germany
- Occupation: Actor
- Years active: 1924-1941

Arthur Kraußneck (born Arthur Carl Gustav Müller; 9 April 1856 – 21 April 1941) was a German stage and film actor.

== Selected filmography ==
- The Adventuress of Monte Carlo (1921)
- The Doomed (1924)
- My Leopold (1924)
- Chronicles of the Gray House (1925)
- The Mill at Sanssouci (1926)
- The Blue Danube (1926)
- Prinz Louis Ferdinand (1927)
- Dancing Vienna (1927)
- The Girl with the Five Zeros (1927)
- The Weavers (1927)
- Luther (1928)

== Bibliography ==
- Wipfler, Esther. Martin Luther in Motion Pictures: History of a Metamorphosis. Vandenhoeck & Ruprecht, 2011.
