= The Journey to Happiness =

1923 film

- Directed by: Heinrich Bolten-Baeckers
- Starring: Leo Peukert; Olga Tschechowa; Camilla Spira
- Production company: BB-Film
- Distributed by: UFA
- Release date: 18 December 1923
- Country: Germany
- Languages: Silent; German intertitles

The Journey to Happiness (German: Die Fahrt ins Glück) is a 1923 silent film directed by Heinrich Bolten-Baeckers and starring Leo Peukert, Olga Tschechowa and Camilla Spira. It also featured Willy Fritsch who would soon emerge as a major star of German cinema. It was distributed by the UFA film conglomerate.

== Cast ==
- Leo Peukert as Fred
- Olga Tschechowa as Alice Holmes, Gesellschafterin
- Camilla Spira as Miß Maud Murray
- Adolphe Engers as Oliver Coopers
- Willy Fritsch as Hans von Werdenfels-Trenin

== Bibliography ==
- Bock, Hans-Michael & Bergfelder, Tim. The Concise CineGraph. Encyclopedia of German Cinema. Berghahn Books, 2009.
- Bock, Hans-Michael & Töteberg, Michael . Das Ufa-Buch. Zweitausendeins, 1992.
- Lamprecht, Gerhard. Deutsche Stummfilme. Gesamtregister. Deutsche Kinemathek, 1970.
