= Paula Conrad =

Austrian-German stage actress

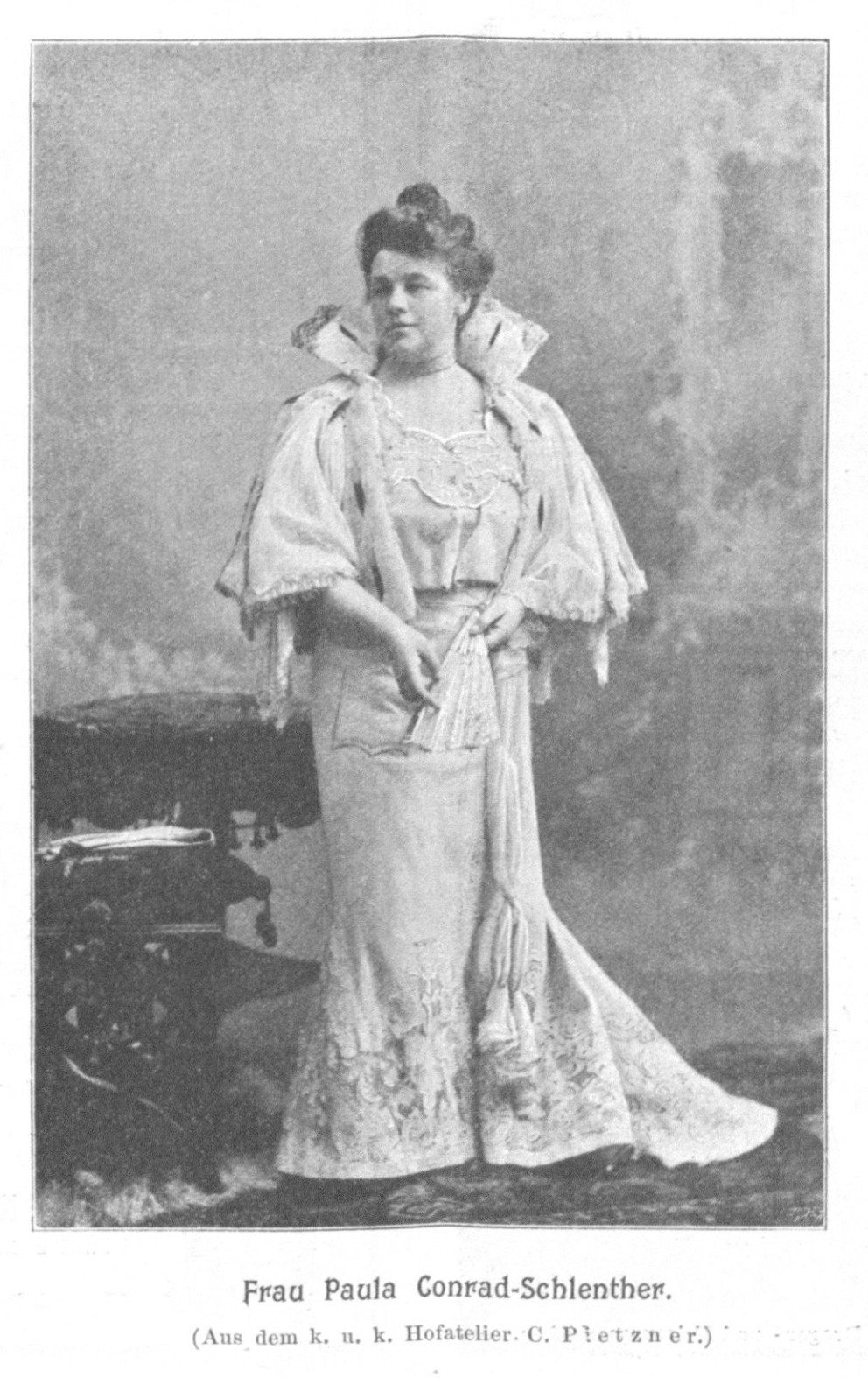
- Portrait of Paula Conrad-Schlenther (1860-1938), Austrian-German actress
- Born: 27 February 1860; Vienna, Austria
- Died: 9 August 1938 (aged 78)
- Resting place: Urnenfriedhof Gerichtstraße, Berlin, Germany; 52.5452°N 13.3661°E
- Occupation: Actress
- Spouse: Paul Schlenther

Paula Conrad-Schlenther (née Conrad; 27 February 1860 – 9 August 1938) was an Austrian-German stage actress.

== Career ==
Paula Conrad made her debut in 1877 in Baden bei Wien. From 1877 she was a member of the ensemble at the Königlichen Schauspielhaus in Berlin. She played Hannele in the 1983 world premiere of Gerhart Hauptmann's Hanneles Himmelfahrt. Alfred Kerr recalls the premiere three decades later, admiring Conrad and stating "blieb sie in jedem Sinn die erste" ("she remained in every sense the first").

== Personal life ==
In 1892, Conrad married Paul Schlenther, the theater critic of the Vossische Zeitung and later director of the Vienna Burgtheater, and she worked for him in Vienna from 1898 to 1910, after which she returned to the Schauspielhaus Berlin, remaining there until 1932. Conrad was primarily a performer of Hauptmann's works, playing roles such as Frau Flamm in Rose Bernd at its 1903 premiere and Aase in Henrik Ibsen's Peer Gynt. She also shortly appeared in silent films.

== Death ==
Her grave is located at Berlin's Urnenfriedhof Gerichtstraße, an urn cemetery.

== Filmography ==
- 1920: Die Verschleierte
- 1921: Die Furcht vor dem Weibe
- 1923: Der verlorene Schuh
- 1924: Mein Leopold
