= Conrad Dreher =

German actor (1859–1944)

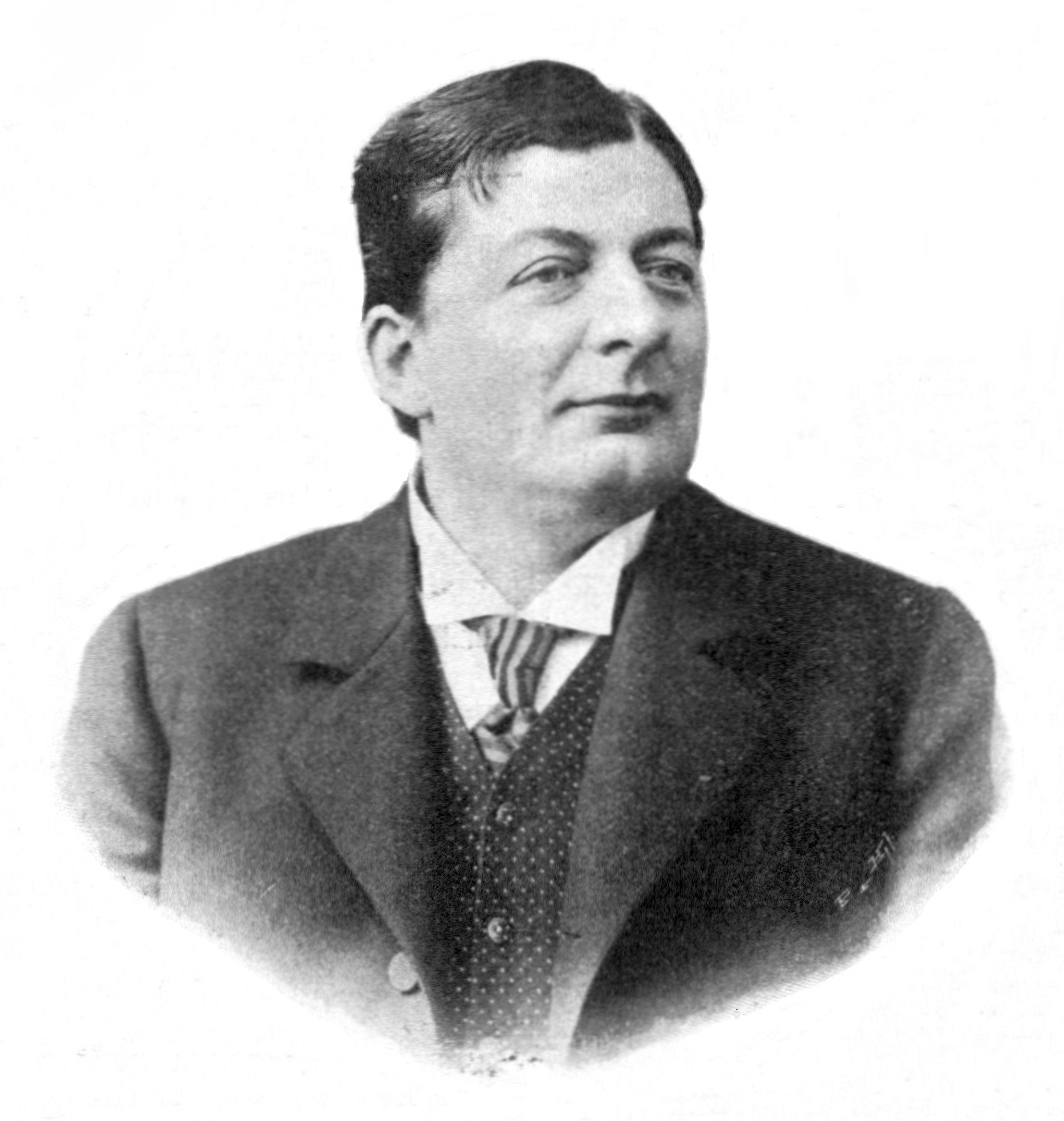
- Dreher in 1904
- Born: 30 October 1859; Munich, Kingdom of Bavaria
- Died: 6 December 1944 (aged 85); Fessenheim, Germany
- Occupation: Actor
- Years active: 1918–1921 (film)

Conrad Dreher (1859–1944) was a German stage actor. He also appeared in several silent films.

== Selected filmography ==
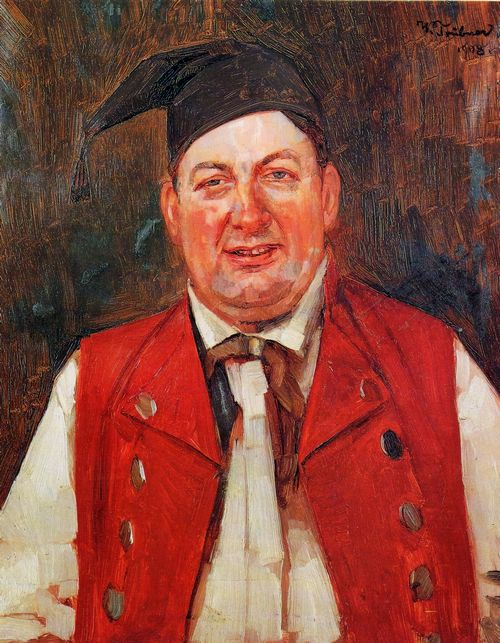
1908 portrait of Dreher by Wilhelm Trübner

- King Krause (1919)
- My Leopold (1919)
- Hasemann's Daughters (1920)
- Doctor Klaus (1920)

== Bibliography ==
- Grange, William. Cultural Chronicle of the Weimar Republic. Scarecrow Press, 2008.
