= The Love of Marion Bach =

- Directed by: Heinrich Bolten-Baeckers
- Written by: Margarete M. Langen
- Produced by: Heinrich Bolten-Baeckers
- Starring: Margarete Neff; Leo Peukert
- Cinematography: Albert Schattmann
- Production company: BB-Film-Fabrikation
- Distributed by: UFA
- Release date: October 1919
- Country: Germany
- Languages: Silent; German intertitles

The Love of Marion Bach (German: Die Liebe der Marion Bach) is a 1919 German silent drama film directed by Heinrich Bolten-Baeckers and starring Margarete Neff and Leo Peukert.

== Cast ==
- Lisa Kehm as Sabine Winkelmann
- Margarete Neff as Marion Bach
- Leo Peukert as Franz von Tornay
- Gustav Rudolph as Ernst Winkelmann
- Hans Stock

== Bibliography ==
- Michael Töteberg. Das Ufa-Buch. Zweitausendeins, 1992.
