= The Girl with the Five Zeros =

1927 film

- Veit Harlan, Viola Garden
- Directed by: Curtis Bernhardt
- Written by: Béla Balázs
- Produced by: Lupu Pick
- Cinematography: Günther Krampf
- Production company: Rex-Film
- Distributed by: Deutsche Vereins-Film
- Release date: 2 December 1927
- Running time: 97 minutes
- Country: Germany
- Languages: Silent; German intertitles

The Girl with the Five Zeros (German: Das Mädchen mit den fünf Nullen) is a 1927 German silent comedy film directed by Curtis Bernhardt. It was shot at the Grunewald Studios in Berlin. The film's sets were designed by Heinrich Richter. The plot concerns a winning lottery ticket.

== Cast ==
- Marcel Salzer as Arnold Lebbecke
- Viola Garden as Lola Lutz
- Paul Bildt as Günther Wahnheim
- Veit Harlan as Ernst Waldt, Maler
- Elsa Wagner as Lebbeckes Frau
- Adele Sandrock as Wahnheims Mutter
- Heinz Rühmann
- Jack Trevor as Hochstapler
- Arthur Kraußneck
- Eberhard Leithoff as Bräutigam
- Lili Schoenborn-Anspach
- Elza Temary as Wahnheims Tochter
- Bruno Ziener as Müller, Lotteriekollekteur

== Bibliography ==
- Bock, Hans-Michael & Bergfelder, Tim. The Concise Cinegraph: Encyclopaedia of German Cinema. Berghahn Books, 2009.
