= A Midsummer Night's Dream (opera) =

1960 opera by Benjamin Britten

- Opera by Benjamin Britten
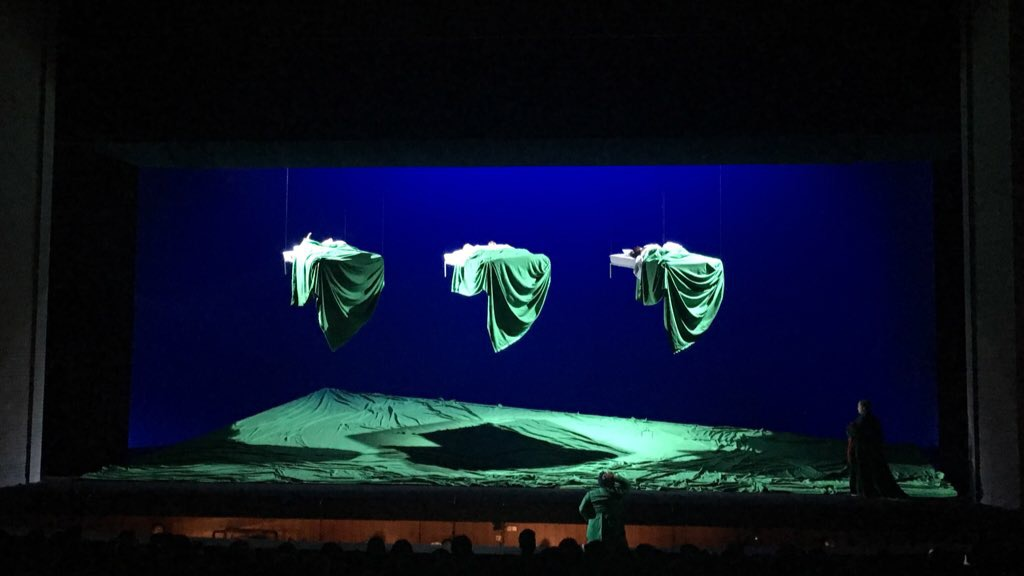
- Britten's A Midsummer Night's Dream at the 19th Beijing Music Festival (2016)
- Librettist: Benjamin Britten; Peter Pears
- Language: English
- Based on: Shakespeare's A Midsummer Night's Dream
- Premiere: 11 June 1960; Aldeburgh Festival

A Midsummer Night's Dream, Op. 64, is an opera with music by Benjamin Britten and set to a libretto adapted by the composer and Peter Pears from William Shakespeare's play, A Midsummer Night's Dream. It was premiered on 11 June 1960 at the Aldeburgh Festival, conducted by the composer and with set and costume designs by Carl Toms. Stylistically, the work is typical of Britten, with a highly individual sound-world – not strikingly dissonant or atonal, but replete with subtly atmospheric harmonies and tone painting. The role of Oberon was composed for the countertenor Alfred Deller. Atypically for Britten, the opera did not include a leading role for his partner Pears, who instead was given the comic drag role of Flute/Thisbe.

== Performance history ==
A Midsummer Night's Dream was first performed on 11 June 1960 at the Jubilee Hall, Aldeburgh, UK, as part of the Aldeburgh Festival. Conducted by the composer, it was directed by the choreographer John Cranko.

The work received wide critical approval following its early performances. Howard Taubman in his review of the Aldeburgh premiere wrote that the orchestral colors of the score conveyed a sense of "soaring illusion" that never wavered and concluded:

Not every problem posed by Shakespeare has been solved, but Mr. Britten has accomplished so much that one may safely predict a wide vogue for his latest and happiest opera.

A dissenting voice was Britten's estranged collaborator W. H. Auden. In a letter to Stephen Spender after seeing the 1961 London production, Auden dismissed it as "Dreadful! Pure Kensington".

Dream was performed at the Royal Opera House, Covent Garden, in 1961, produced by John Gielgud and conducted by Georg Solti. This production was revived six times to 1984.

Welsh National Opera staged the opera in 1978, starring Sir Geraint Evans as Bottom, James Bowman as Oberon, Rita Cullis as Titania and Sylvester McCoy as Puck. A performance conducted by Stuart Hose at Theatr Clywd was broadcast live on BBC Radio Three and BBC Two on 6th May 1978

The English Music Theatre Company staged the opera at Snape Maltings in 1980, directed by Christopher Renshaw and designed by Robin Don; the production was revived at the Royal Opera House for one performance in 1986.

Peter Hall directed a production in 1981 for Glyndebourne that by 2016 had been revived nine times.

In 2005, the Royal Opera House, Covent Garden, produced a version directed by Olivia Fuchs at the Linbury Studio Theatre with the Tiffin Boys' Choir. William Towers was Oberon, and Gillian Keith Tytania.

English National Opera's production of 2011, directed by Christopher Alden, set the opera in a mid-20th-century school, with Oberon (Iestyn Davies) and Tytania (Anna Christy) as teachers and Puck and the fairies as schoolboys. Oberon's relationship with Puck (Jamie Manton) is given overtly sexual overtones, and Puck responds with alternate anger and despair to Oberon's new-found interest in Tytania's Changeling boy. The silent older man who stalks the action in the first two acts is revealed to be Theseus (Paul Whelan); reviewers have suggested that in this staging Theseus himself was once the object of Oberon's attentions, and is either watching history repeating itself, or is in fact daydreaming the magical events of the opera prior to his marriage to Hippolyta.

== Roles ==
Roles, voice types; premiere cast
Role	Voice type	Premiere cast, 11 June 1960 Conductor: Benjamin Britten Director: John Cranko
Oberon, King of the Fairies	countertenor	Alfred Deller
Tytania, Queen of the Fairies	coloratura soprano	Jennifer Vyvyan
Puck	speaking role	Lorca Massine (as "Leonide Massine II")
Cobweb	treble	Kevin Platts
Mustardseed	treble	Robert McCutcheon
Moth	treble	Barry Ferguson
Peaseblossom	treble	Michael Bauer
Lysander	tenor	George Maran
Demetrius	baritone	Thomas Hemsley
Hermia, in love with Lysander	mezzo-soprano	Marjorie Thomas
Helena, in love with Demetrius	soprano	April Cantelo
Theseus, Duke of Athens	bass	Forbes Robinson
Hippolyta, Queen of the Amazons	contralto	Johanna Peters
Bottom, a weaver (Pyramus)	bass-baritone	Owen Brannigan
Quince, a carpenter (Director)	bass	Norman Lumsden
Flute, a bellows-mender (Thisbe)	tenor	Peter Pears
Snug, a joiner (Lion)	bass	David Kelly
Snout, a tinker (Wall)	tenor	Edward Byles
Starveling, a tailor (Moonshine)	baritone	Joseph Ward

== Instrumentation ==
- woodwinds: 2 flutes (2nd with piccolo), oboe (with English horn), 2 clarinets, bassoon
- Brass: 2 horns, trumpet in D, trombone
- percussion (2 players): timpani, triangle, cymbals, tambourine, gong, 2 wood blocks, vibraphone, glockenspiel, xylophone, tamburo, snare drum, tenor drum, bass drum, 2 bells
- Other: 2 harps, harpsichord (celesta), strings (minimum: 4.2.2.2.2)
- Stage band: sopranino recorders, cymbals, 2 wood blocks

== Analysis ==
Britten delineated the three tiers of characters, the rustics being given folk-like "simple" music, the lovers a more romantic sound-world and the fairies being represented in a very ethereal way. Almost all of the action now takes place in the woods around Athens, and the fairies inhabit a much more prominent place in the drama. The comic performance by the rustics of Pyramus and Thisbe at the final wedding takes on an added dimension as a parody of nineteenth-century Italian opera. Thisbe's lament, accompanied by obbligato flute, is a parody of a Donizetti "mad scene" ("Il dolce suono").

The opera contains several innovations: it is extremely rare in opera that the lead male role is written for the countertenor voice to sing. The part of Oberon was created by Alfred Deller. Britten wrote specifically for his voice, which, despite its ethereal quality, had a low range compared to more modern countertenors. Oberon's music almost never requires the countertenor to sing both at the top of the alto range and forte.

The plot of the opera follows that of the play, with several alterations. Most of Shakespeare's act 1 is cut, compensated for by the opera's only added line: "Compelling thee to marry with Demetrius." Therefore, much greater precedence is given to the wood, and to the fairies. This is also indicated by the opening portamenti strings, and by the ethereal countertenor voice that is Oberon, the male lead, who throughout is accompanied by a characteristic texture of harp and celeste, in the same way that Puck's appearance is heralded by the combination of trumpet and snare-drum.

The opera opens with a chorus, "Over hill, over dale" from Tytania's attendant fairies, played by boy sopranos. Other highlights include Oberon's florid – the exotic celeste is especially notable – aria,"I know a bank" (inspired by Purcell's "Sweeter than roses", which Britten had previously arranged for Pears to sing), Tytania's equally florid "Come now, a roundel", the chorus's energetic "You spotted snakes", the hilarious comedy of Pyramus and Thisbe, and the final trio for Oberon, Tytania and the chorus.

The introduction of a chorus of boy-fairies means that the opera becomes greatly concerned with the theme of purity. It is these juvenile fairies who eventually quell the libidinous activities of the quartet of lovers, as they sing a beautiful melody on the three "motto chords" (also on the four "magic" chords) of the second act: "Jack shall have Jill/Naught shall go ill/The man shall have his mare again/And all shall be well." Sung by boys, it could be considered that this goes beyond irony, and represents an idealised vision of a paradise of innocence and purity that Britten seems to have been captivated by throughout his life.

Britten also pays attention to the play's central motif: the madness of love. Curiously, he took the one relationship in the play that is grotesque (that of Tytania and Bottom) and placed it in the centre of his opera (in the middle of act 2). Women in Britten operas tend to run to extremes, being either predators or vulnerable prey, but Tytania is an amalgam; she dominates Bottom, but is herself completely dominated by Oberon and Puck, the couple that are usually considered to really hold power in The Dream. Their cruel pranks eventually quell her coloratura, which until she is freed from the power of the love-juice is fiendishly difficult to sing.

Britten also parodied operatic convention in less obvious ways than Pyramus and Thisbe. Like many other operas, A Midsummer Night's Dream opens with a chorus, but it is a chorus of unbroken boys' voices, singing in unison. After this comes the entrance of the prima donna and the male lead, who is as far away as possible from Wagner's heldentenors, and as close as it is possible to get to Handel's castrati of the 18th century.: "There is an air of baroque fantasy in the music." Britten's treatment of Puck also suggests parody. In opera, the hero's assistant is traditionally sung by baritones, yet here we have an adolescent youth who speaks, rather than sings.

Britten thought the character of Puck "absolutely amoral and yet innocent." Describing the speaking, tumbling Puck of the opera, Britten wrote "I got the idea of doing Puck like this in Stockholm, where I saw some Swedish child acrobats with extraordinary agility and powers of mimicry, and suddenly realised we could do Puck this way."

== Recordings ==
There are many recordings available, including two conducted by the composer, one a live recording of the 11 June 1960 premiere with the complete original cast, the second a studio recording made in 1967 with some of the original cast, Deller as Oberon, Owen Brannigan as Bottom, and Peter Pears elevated from Flute to Lysander, which omits some music from the lovers' awakening early in act 3.

There are three complete studio recordings of the opera:

- 1966 – Alfred Deller (Oberon), Elizabeth Harwood (Tytiana), Stephen Terry (Puck), John Shirley-Quirk (Theseus), Helen Watts (Hippolyta), Peter Pears (Lysander), Thomas Hemsley (Demetrius), Josephine Veasey (Hermia), Heather Harper (Helena), Owen Brannigan (Bottom), Norman Lumsden (Quince), Kenneth MacDonald (Flute), David Kelly (Snug), Keith Raggett (Starveling), Robert Tear (Snout), Richard Dakin (Cobweb), Ian Wodehouse (Mustard seed), John Pryer (Peaseblossom), Graham Clark (Moth) – Choirs of Downside and Emanuel Schools, London Symphony Orchestra, conducted by Benjamin Britten – Decca Records 3 LPs (1967), 2 CDs (1990)
- 1990 – James Bowman (Oberon), Lillian Watson (Tytania), Dexter Fletcher (Puck), Norman Bailey (Theseus), Penelope Walker (Hippolyta), John Graham-Hall (Lysander), Henry Herford (Demetrius), Della Jones (Hermia), Jill Gomez (Helena), Donald Maxwell (Bottom), Roger Bryson (Quince), Adrian Thompson (Flute) – Trinity Boys' Choir, City of London Sinfonia, conducted by Richard Hickox – Virgin Classics 2 CDs (1993)
- 1995 – Brian Asawa (Oberon), Sylvia McNair (Tytania), Carl Ferguson (Puck), Brian Bannatyne-Scott (Theseus), Hilary Summers (Hippolyta), John Mark Ainsley (Lysander), Paul Whelan (Demetrius), Ruby Philogene (Hermia), Janice Watson (Helena), Robert Lloyd (Bottom), Gwynne Howell (Quince), Ian Bostridge (Flute), Stephen Richardson (Snug), Neal Davies (Starveling), Mark Tucker (Snout), David Newman (Cobweb), Sara Rey (Mustardseed), Claudia Conway (Peaseblossom), Matthew Long (Moth) – New London Children's Choir, London Symphony Orchestra, conducted by Sir Colin Davis – Philips Classics 2 CDs (1996)

== Notes and references ==
=== References ===
- "Britten, Benjamin—A Midsummer Night's Dream (1960)". Boosey & Hawkes. Archived from the original on 6 October 2012.
- Brett, Philip (1990). Britten's Dream (Brief essay to accompany the Britten recording). Decca Records.
- Britten, Benjamin (2003) [first published 1960]. "A New Britten Opera (1960)". In Kildea, Paul Francis (ed.). Britten on Music. Oxford: Oxford University Press. pp. 186–189. ISBN 9780198167143.
- Capon, Brian, ed. (September 2008). "Recordings of A Midsummer Night's Dream". Opera Discography. Archived from the original on 27 November 2010.
- Clements, Andrew (20 May 2011). "A Midsummer Night's Dream – review". The Guardian. Archived from the original on 10 March 2016.
- Coghlan, Alexandra (12 August 2016). "A Midsummer Night's Dream, Glyndebourne". The Arts Desk.
- Craine, Debra; Mackrell, Judith, eds. (2010). "Massine, Lorca". The Oxford Dictionary of Dance (2nd ed.). Oxford: Oxford University Press. doi:10.1093/acref/9780199563449.001.0001. ISBN 9780191727658.
- Glyndebourne Festival Opera. "Explore A Midsummer Night's Dream".
- McDonald, Russ (2012). "Benjamin Britten's Dreams". In Holland, Peter (ed.). Shakespeare Survey. Vol. 65, A Midsummer Night's Dream. Cambridge: Cambridge University Press. pp. 138–146. doi:10.1017/SSO9781139170000. ISBN 9781139170000 – via Cambridge Core.
- "A Midsummer Night's Dream (1961)". Royal Opera House Collections Online. Archived from the original on 23 July 2011.
- "A Midsummer Night's Dream (1986)". Royal Opera House Collections Online. Archived from the original on 23 July 2011.
- "A Midsummer Night's Dream (2005)". Royal Opera House Collections Online. Archived from the original on 23 July 2011.
- Slatkin, Leonard (2025). "Notes on the Music of A Midsummer Night's Dream". Opera Theatre of Saint Louis.
- Taubman, Howard (19 June 1960). "Britten's Dream; His Setting of Shakespeare Drama Is Composer's Newest, Happiest Opera" (PDF). The New York Times. p. 9.
- White, Michael (22 May 1994). "Sweet Dream, sour looks". The Independent on Sunday. Archived from the original on 11 November 2012.
- White, Michael (20 May 2011). "ENO's shocking new paedophile Midsummer Night's Dream is brilliant, and I hated it". The Daily Telegraph Blogs. Archived from the original on 30 July 2013.
- Whittall, Arnold (1998). "Midsummer Night's Dream, A". In Sadie, Stanley (ed.). The New Grove Dictionary of Opera. Vol. 3. London: Macmillan. pp. 379–381. ISBN 1-56159-228-5.
