= The Blue Danube (1926 film) =

1926 film

- Directed by: Frederic Zelnik
- Written by: Fanny Carlsen; Charles Dunn
- Produced by: Frederic Zelnik
- Starring: Harry Liedtke; Lya Mara; Hans Junkermann; Julius Falkenstein
- Cinematography: Frederik Fuglsang
- Music by: Willy Schmidt-Gentner
- Production company: Zelnik-Film
- Distributed by: Deutsche Lichtspiel-Syndikat; Graham-Wilcox Productions (UK); Aywon Pictures (US)
- Release date: 16 August 1926
- Running time: 93 minutes
- Country: Germany
- Languages: Silent; German intertitles

The Blue Danube (German: An der schönen blauen Donau) is a 1926 German silent romance film directed by Frederic Zelnik and starring Harry Liedtke, Lya Mara and Hans Junkermann. The film has been described as a paean to Austria. It was shot at the Staaken Studios in Berlin. The film's art direction was by Andrej Andrejew and Jacek Rotmil who designed the sets.

== Cast ==
- Harry Liedtke as Graf Oskar Zirsky
- Lya Mara as Mizzi Staudinger
- Hans Junkermann as Erzherzog Ignaz
- Julius Falkenstein as Erbgraf Zirsky
- Ernő Verebes as Graf Rudi Zirsky
- Hans Albers as Graf Jaromir
- Henry Bender as Graf Casimir
- Hugo Döblin
- Olga Engl as Gräfin Zirsky
- Arthur Kraußneck as Josef Stingl
- Max Leffler as Kardinal Graf Zirsky
- Albert Paulig as Adjutant v. Erzherzog Ignaz
- Karl Platen as Florian Staudinger, Schuhmachermeister
- Frida Richard

== Bibliography ==
- Prawer, Siegbert Salomon (2005). Between Two Worlds: The Jewish Presence in German and Austrian Film, 1910–1933. New York: Berghahn Books. ISBN 978-1-84545-074-8.
