= The Second Mother (1925 film) =

1925 film

- Directed by: Heinrich Bolten-Baeckers
- Written by: Heinrich Bolten-Baeckers
- Produced by: Heinrich Bolten-Baeckers
- Starring: Margarete Lanner; Hans Mierendorff; Maria Melchoir; Jack Trevor
- Cinematography: Hermann Boettger; Albert Schattmann
- Production company: BB-Film-Fabrikation
- Distributed by: UFA
- Release date: 10 December 1925
- Country: Germany
- Languages: Silent; German intertitles

The Second Mother (German: Die zweite Mutter) is a 1925 German silent comedy film directed by Heinrich Bolten-Baeckers and starring Margarete Lanner, Hans Mierendorff and Maria Melchoir. It was one of a number of popular comedies released by UFA alongside its more prestigious art films.

== Cast ==
- Margarete Lanner as Dorette Petresco
- Hans Mierendorff as Ernst v. Schönwald
- Maria Melchoir as Herta
- Jack Trevor as Baron Fred Brochstädt
- Liselotte Krämer as Lori
- Mary Hannes
- Oskar Fuchs as van der Verde
- Leo Peukert as T. Weiringer
- Emil Sondermannas Johann
- Carl Zickner
- Hans Stock

== Bibliography ==
- Kreimeier, Klaus. The Ufa Story: A History of Germany's Greatest Film Company, 1918-1945. University of California Press, 1999.
