= Endymion (Disraeli novel) =

1880 novel by Benjamin Disraeli

- First edition book cover
- Author: Benjamin Disraeli
- Language: English
- Genre: Novel
- Publisher: Longmans & Green
- Publication date: 1880
- Publication place: United Kingdom
- Media type: Print (Hardback & Paperback)

Endymion is a novel published in 1880 by Benjamin Disraeli, 1st Earl of Beaconsfield, the former Conservative Prime Minister of the United Kingdom. He was paid an advance of £10,000 for it (equivalent to £1,040,089 in 2025). It was the last novel Disraeli published before his death. He had been writing another, Falconet, when he died; it was published, incomplete, after his death.

== Background ==
Like most of Disraeli's novels, Endymion is a romance, although Disraeli took the unusual step of setting it between 1819 and 1859. This meant that the hero of the novel–Endymion Ferrars–had to be a Whig, rather than a Tory. The time period that Disraeli chose was dominated by the Whig party; there would have been little opportunity for a young, rising Tory. Given that, it seems likely that Disraeli chose the time period so he could dwell for a final time in the world in which he grew up and began his ascent.

== Plot ==
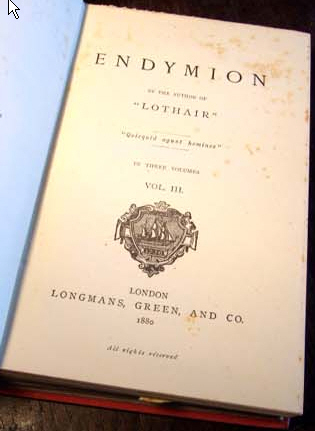
First edition from 1880 title page from Vol iii

William Pitt Ferrars, a rising Tory politician with cabinet ambitions, is disappointed of his hopes by the fall of the Tory ministry of the Duke of Wellington in 1832, and his party's overwhelming defeat in that year's parliamentary election.

He retires from his opulent house in Hill Street, London, to the modest country estate of Hurstley; his failure to reenter the government in Sir Robert Peel's brief ministry in 1835, and his inability to secure a parliamentary seat in the subsequent elections, leads his wife to die of sorrow and disillusionment, and ultimately to his own suicide.

He leaves behind him two adolescent children, Endymion and Myra, who are determined to redeem their father's legacy. Endymion has received a clerkship in Somerset House, a government office, and takes lodgings at the home of the Rodneys, former protégés of his parents; at Somerset House he becomes acquainted with fellow clerks Trenchard, Seymour Hicks, and the aspiring but pretentious novelist St. Barbe; Trenchard lays the foundations for his future career by introducing him to the debating club of the politically minded Bertie Tremaine.

In the meantime his sister is hired as a companion to the daughter of Adrian Neuchatel, a great Whig magnate and banker. Myra becomes a favorite member of the household, and her position enables her to introduce Endymion to the high society of the Whig party. Myra herself is wooed and won by Lord Roehampton, secretary of state in the Melbourne ministry. This places her in a position to forward Endymion's career, and she recommends him for private secretary to the Whig cabinet minister Sidney Wilton, an old friend of her father. Her brother distinguishes himself. In the elections of 1841, however, the Whigs are voted out of office, and Endymion loses his position. He compensates for this by getting elected to parliament in a constituency controlled by the Whig Lord Montfort, whose wife Endymion has befriended.

In Parliament, under the guidance of Lord Roehampton, Endymion's makes his mark among the Whig opposition; and when his party returns to power in 1846 he becomes under-secretary of state to Lord Roehampton; when the latter dies of overwork, Endymion resigns rather than serve under his successor. Meanwhile, Prince Florestan, a pretender in exile from his country, whom Endymion knew at Eton, has returned to his country and successfully established himself on his throne. He now offers the widowed Myra (whom he has met at the Neuchatels) the crown as his queen. She accepts. Endymion, devastated at this separation from his sister, finds consolation in the love of Lady Montfort, whose husband has died. Although his party is soon again evicted from government, he is now a prominent member of the out-of-power Whigs, headed by Sidney Wilton; with the fall of the Tory ministry Sidney Wilton becomes Prime Minister, and Endymion his secretary of state; through success in foreign wars and prosperous management of relations with the continent, Endymion makes himself the natural successor to Sidney Wilton. When the latter resigns, Endymion is charged by the queen with the formation of the next government.

== Characters ==
The title character's name is a reference to the shepherd Endymion of Greek mythology, familiar in 19th-century culture as the title of an 1818 John Keats poem among other references. It is explained in the text as a traditional name of his noble family since the time of Charles the First, and is in fact represented historically among English nobles such as Endymion Porter.

It is very like his own autobiography, with his retrospection of English politics woven into the thread of a story. The action and conversations are distributed between characters who had figured in English politics or the fashionable romance of Europe during the last forty years.

Endymion is Disraeli in his youth. Zenobia, a queen of fashion, is based on his Lady Blessington with a combination of some other great lady. She was the first great patroness of Disraeli's career. Zenobia later retires to the background to give place to Lady Montfort. She is a combination of Lady Blessington and Mrs. Wyndham Lewis (the latter Disraeli married) so we have in Lady Montfort at once the patroness and the wife.

St Barbe, the journalist in " Endymion, " is an intended caricature of Thackeray, and Gushy is Dickens. Vigo, a minor character of the novel, is a combination of Poole, the tailor, and George Hudson, the Sunderland railway king, as he was styled in his time. Prince Florestan is probably a sketch of Louis Napoleon in his early days in England. He is constantly presented as a child of destiny wailing for the European revolution of '48 to give him back his throne.

Job Thornberry comes into the story with the Anti-Corn-Law League, representing the remarkable change in English politics which made the Whigs so different from what they were fifty years earlier and which necessitated the passage of Reform Bills even by the Conservative Derby-Disraeli ministries. Job Thornberry may be Richard Cobden; for he certainly has much of Cobden's subject in him. The energetic and capable minister Lord Roehampton is taken to be Lord Palmerston, and Count Ferrol is perhaps Bismarck. Neuchatel, the great banker, is the historical Rothschild; Cardinal Henry Edward Manning figures as the tendentious papist Nigel Penruddock.

- William Pitt Ferrars, Endymion's father, distinguished Tory politician in 1830s
- Mrs Ferrars, Endymion's mother
- Endymion Ferrars
- Myra Ferrars, Endymion's twin sister, wife of Lord Roehampton, later of Florestan
- Earl of Roehampton, Secretary of state, prominent Whig politician, and Endymion's patron
- King Florestan, Endymion's childhood friend, and exiled pretender to a continental throne (presumably France)
- Berengaria, Lady Montfort, distinguished Whig society lady, Endymion's patroness, later his wife
- Lord Montfort, eccentric Whig nobleman
- Count Ferrol, continental statesman
- Baron Sergius, continental statesman, friend of Florestan
- The Duke of St Angelo, Florestan's chamberlain
- Bertie Tremaine, prominent MP, leader of third party in house of commons of 1841; of ambiguous principles
- Tremaine Bertie, brother of the latter, MP, member of his party
- Job Thornberry, leader of Anti-Corn-Law League, radical MP
- Nigel Penruddock, the Archbishop of Tyre, rejected lover of Myra, churchman, Tractarian
- St. Barbe, vain, envious satirical novelist
- Trenchard, Whig MP, Endymion's friend
- Seymour Hicks, social climber, Endymion's friend
- Mr Rodney, protégé of Pitt Ferrars, Endymion's friend, Tory MP
- Mrs Rodney, protégée of Lady Ferrars
- Earl of Beaumaris, tenant of the Rodneys, socially reclusive, prominent Tory politician
- Lady Beaumaris, sister of Mrs Rodney, prominent Tory society figure in 1840s
- Zenobia, prominent Tory society figure in 1830s
- Sidney Wilton, Whig minister, Endymion's patron, ultimately Prime Minister
- Lord Waldershare, tenant of the Rodneys, eccentric nobleman, Tory MP.

== Themes ==
The novel is drawing heavily on Disraeli's own life and career. The central theme is the decisive influence of powerful women and personal networks in driving political and social change. Set between the late 1820s and 1850s, the story examines how an outsider without wealth or aristocratic title can navigate the rigid British class system. Despite Victorian women lacking formal voting rights or political office, Disraeli portrays them as the true architects behind political success of their protege. It is the inner view of Disraeli's novel which gives it real significance.

== Publication ==
Disraeli, Benjamin (1880). Endymion (3 volumes). London: Longmans & Green. Internet Archive: Volume 1, Volume 2, Volume 3. (The author's name appears only on the spine.)

== Sources ==
- Blake, Robert (1966). Disraeli. New York: St. Martin's Press. ISBN 0-19-832903-2.
- Blake, Robert. "The Dating of Endymion" in The Review of English Studies, New Series, Vol. 17, No. 66. (May, 1966), 177–182.
