= Sabine Impekoven =

German actress (1889–1970)

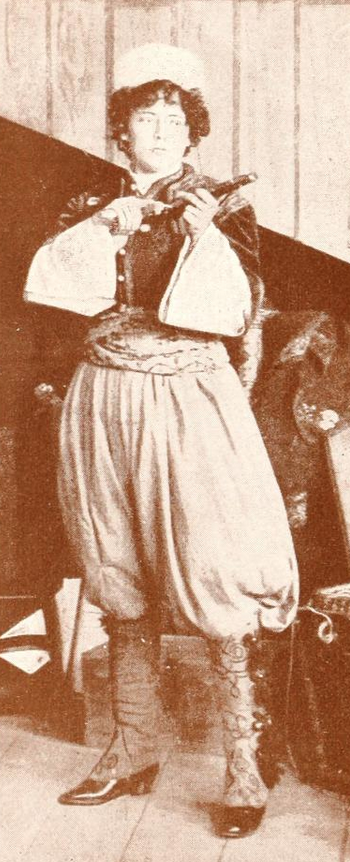
- Impekoven in costume as "Olga" in War's Red Ruin (1913)
- Born: 16 June 1889; Cologne, German Empire
- Died: 25 April 1970 (aged 80); Frankfurt am Main, West Germany
- Resting place: Munich Waldfriedhof
- Occupation: Actress
- Years active: 1912–1923 (film)
- Spouse: Leo Peukert (m. 1914; died 1944)
- Relatives: Toni Impekoven (brother); Niddy Impekoven (niece)

Sabine Impekoven (16 June 1889 – 25 April 1970) was a German film actress of the silent era. She was married to the actor Leo Peukert and appeared alongside him in several films. She was the sister of Toni Impekoven.

== Selected filmography ==
- Die geheimnisvolle Villa (1914)
- My Leopold (1919)
- King Krause (1919)
- Hasemann's Daughters (1920)
- Doctor Klaus (1920)

== Bibliography ==
Thomas Elsaesser & Michael Wedel. A Second Life: German Cinema's First Decades. Amsterdam University Press, 1996.
