= The Lonei Household =

The Lonei Household (German: Haus Lonei) is an 1880 play by the German writer Adolphe L'Arronge.

== Bibliography ==
- Grange, William. Historical Dictionary of German Theater. Rowman & Littlefield, 2015.
