= Eugen Engel =

East Prussian composer (1875–1943)

- Born: 19 September 1875
- Died: 26 March 1943 (aged 67)
- Occupation: Composer

Eugen Engel (1875–1943) was a composer murdered during the Holocaust.

Engel was born on 19 September 1875 in Widminnen, East Prussia – today Wydminy in the Warmia-Masuria Voivodship of Poland. He was killed in Sobibór extermination camp on 26 March 1943, at the age of 67.

His opera Grete Minde was first performed in 2022 at the Theater Magdeburg in Germany.
