= The Happy Journey =

The Happy Journey is a 1963 Australian television play based on the Thornton Wilder play The Happy Journey to Trenton and Camden (1963).

It was the first Australian television play filmed in Hobart. The director was John Baldwin.

The play had been filmed for British television and adapted for Australian radio in 1944.

It aired in Hobart on 30 July 1963, Sydney on 19 August 1963 and Melbourne on 2 October 1963.

== Premise ==
Almost the entire play takes place during an automobile journey from Newark to Camden, New Jersey, by a family on their way to visit a married daughter, who has recently lost a baby in childbirth.

== Cast ==
- Marcus Cooney
- Barbara Crompton
- Aileen Jenkins
- Patricia Owen
- Nigel Triffit
