= Falconet (novel) =

Unfinished novel by Benjamin Disraeli

- Author: Benjamin Disraeli
- Language: English
- Publisher: The Times
- Publication date: 1905
- Media type: Print

Falconet is the name generally given to the untitled, final and unfinished novel of the British prime minister Benjamin Disraeli, who died before completing it.

== Background ==
Disraeli started work on his final novel in late 1880, a few months before his death in April 1881. It ends mid-sentence one paragraph into its tenth chapter. The work was first published in 1905 in The Times, twenty-four years after Disraeli’s death and was entitled Falconet since Disraeli usually named his novels after their main character.

== Plot ==
Joseph Toplady Falconet is the third son of the owner of a successful bank. He is determined to uphold religious traditionalism and talks too long and earnestly, sometimes on rumours which turn out to be untrue (such as the return of the slave trade in the Red Sea).

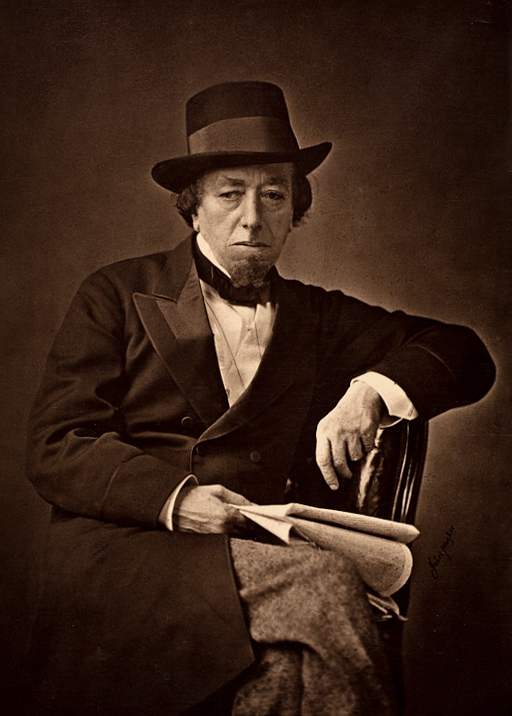
Disraeli in 1878, a few years before he wrote "Falconet"

Early in the novel an unknown middle-aged gentleman takes a hackney carriage journey from the London port to a hotel accompanied by a buddhist called Kusinara whom he has met on the voyage and who has come to England to investigate reports that it is in decline. Arriving on a Sunday when the streets are deserted, he is pleasantly surprised.

The novel then introduces Lady Claribel Bertram who is a remarried widow. Lord Bertram has a son from his first marriage, Lord Gaston, who got expelled from public school, university and a foreign embassy before becoming an MP, which position he also quit. He holds radical views which were starting to influence Lady Bertram, until she became acquainted with Gaston’s successor as MP, Falconet, who visits her regularly to expound his views at length.

A neighbour of Falconet's father dies and his brother, Mr Hartmann, and niece come to live in the deceased’s home. Falconet's parents are concerned that Mr Hartmann is not a churchgoer. Mr Hartmann is an acquaintance of the unknown gentleman and Kusinara and shares the view that mankind needs to be eradicated and that a vehicle for achieving this is religion.

At a ball Lady Bertram is approached by an elegant man saying that the hostess (Lady Clanmore) has asked him to attend her. The gentleman says that his friends admire her, respect her views and that she could in some sense lead them. Lady Bertram has no idea what he is talking about but, out of vanity, plays along. When Lady Clanmore approaches, the gentleman disappears and it transpires that nobody knows his identity.

The novel ends by describing how Kusinara is well acquainted with the Falconets.

== Reception ==
A review of the novel appeared in The Spectator when the incomplete work was finally published in 1905. Although complimentary about some aspects of the novel (such as its “amazing facility in portraiture” and its “peculiar brand of epigram of which Disraeli alone had the secret”) the reviewer was overall disappointed since Disraeli’s “wisdom and acumen had ebbed,” resulting in, “the comic spirit [being] a little weary.”

Disraeli’s biographer Robert Blake, however, wrote that, “the novel shows no signs of failing talent….and one can only regret that it was never finished."

== Analysis ==
Falconet is generally regarded as a cruel parody of Disraeli’s long-time political rival William Gladstone. Falconet shares with Gladstone his religious fervour, intelligence and oratorical style but is described as “essentially a prig”, “arrogant and peremptory” and having “a complete deficiency in the sense of humour”.

It has also been suggested that Lady Bertram was "one more memory of Lady Palmerston" and that the character of Hartmann, a nihilist, was inspired by the assassination of Tsar Alexander II of Russia which took place whilst Disraeli was writing the novel.
