= Anna Skryleva =

Russian-born German conductor (born 1975)

Anna Skryleva (born 1975 in Moscow) is a German conductor of Russian origin.

== Biography ==
Anna Skryleva received her first piano lessons at the age of five and wrote her first works at the age of eight. She was accepted into the composition class at the Moscow Tchaikovsky Conservatory, where she also studied pianism and chamber music.

After settling in Germany in 1999, she studied at the University of the Arts in Berlin (piano class with Klaus Hellwig) and took conducting lessons with Professor Lutz Herbig in Düsseldorf.

== Career in Germany ==
From 2002 to 2003, she was an assistant to professor of opera conducting Alicja Mounk at the Karlsruhe University of Music. From 2007 to 2012, Skryleva performed in numerous opera productions at the Hamburg State Opera under the direction of general music director and artistic director Simone Young, and also performed with the Hamburg Philharmonic Orchestra.

From 2012 to 2013, she was deputy general music director and first Kapellmeister at the Schleswig-Holstein Opera. From 2013 to 2015, she held the same position for two seasons at the Staatstheater Darmstadt. She made her Darmstadt debut on 15 March 2014 with Giuseppe Verdi's Otello. In 2015, she participated in the first international workshop for women conductors in Dallas. On 1 August 2019, she took over as Generalmusikdirektor at the Theater Magdeburg. Critics noted this as evidence of the growing role of women in the world of classical music.

== Personal life ==
Skryleva is married to opera singer Dieter Schweickart.
