= Heinrich Bolten-Baeckers =

German playwright, lyricist, publisher, film director, film producer and screenwriter

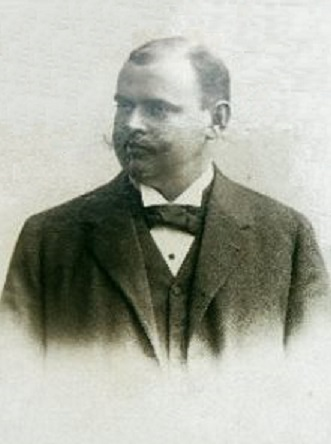
- Heinrich Bolten-Baeckers (c. 1899)
- Born: 10 April 1871; Chemnitz, German Empire
- Died: 30 January 1938 (aged 66); Dresden, Nazi Germany
- Other name: Heinrich Eduard Hermann Bolten
- Occupations: Director, Producer, Screenwriter
- Years active: 1906 - 1925

Heinrich Bolten-Baeckers (1871–1938) was a German playwright, screenwriter, film director and producer. He worked on a number of films during the silent era. Towards the end of his film career he directed comedies for UFA such as The Gentleman Without a Residence and The Second Mother.

== Selected filmography ==
=== Director ===
- My Leopold (1914)
- My Leopold (1919)
- King Krause (1919)
- The Love of Marion Bach (1919)
- Doctor Klaus (1920)
- Hasemann's Daughters (1920)
- The Journey to Happiness (1923)
- My Leopold (1924)
- The Gentleman Without a Residence (1925)
- The Second Mother (1925)

== Bibliography ==
- Kreimeier, Klaus. The UFA Story: A History of Germany's Greatest Film Company. University of California Press, 1999.
