= Theater Magdeburg =

German theatre organization

- Formation: 2004
- Merger of: Theater der Landeshauptstadt; Freie Kammerspiele
- Location: Magdeburg, Germany
- Intendant: Julien Chavaz
- Website: theater-magdeburg.de

Theater Magdeburg is the principal theatre organization in Magdeburg, Germany, the capital of the state Saxony-Anhalt. It was formed in 2004 with the merger of two theatres, the Theater der Landeshauptstadt (Theatre of the state capital) and the Freie Kammerspiele (Free chamber plays). It presents performances of opera, ballet, musical theatre, concerts, and plays. Theater Magdeburg has its own opera, ballet, and theatre companies and is the home of the Magdeburg Philharmonic Orchestra. It has three main performing venues. the Opernhaus (Opera House), the Schauspielhaus (Playhouse), and the DomplatzOpenAir, which is set up each summer near Magdeburg Cathedral.

== Opernhaus ==
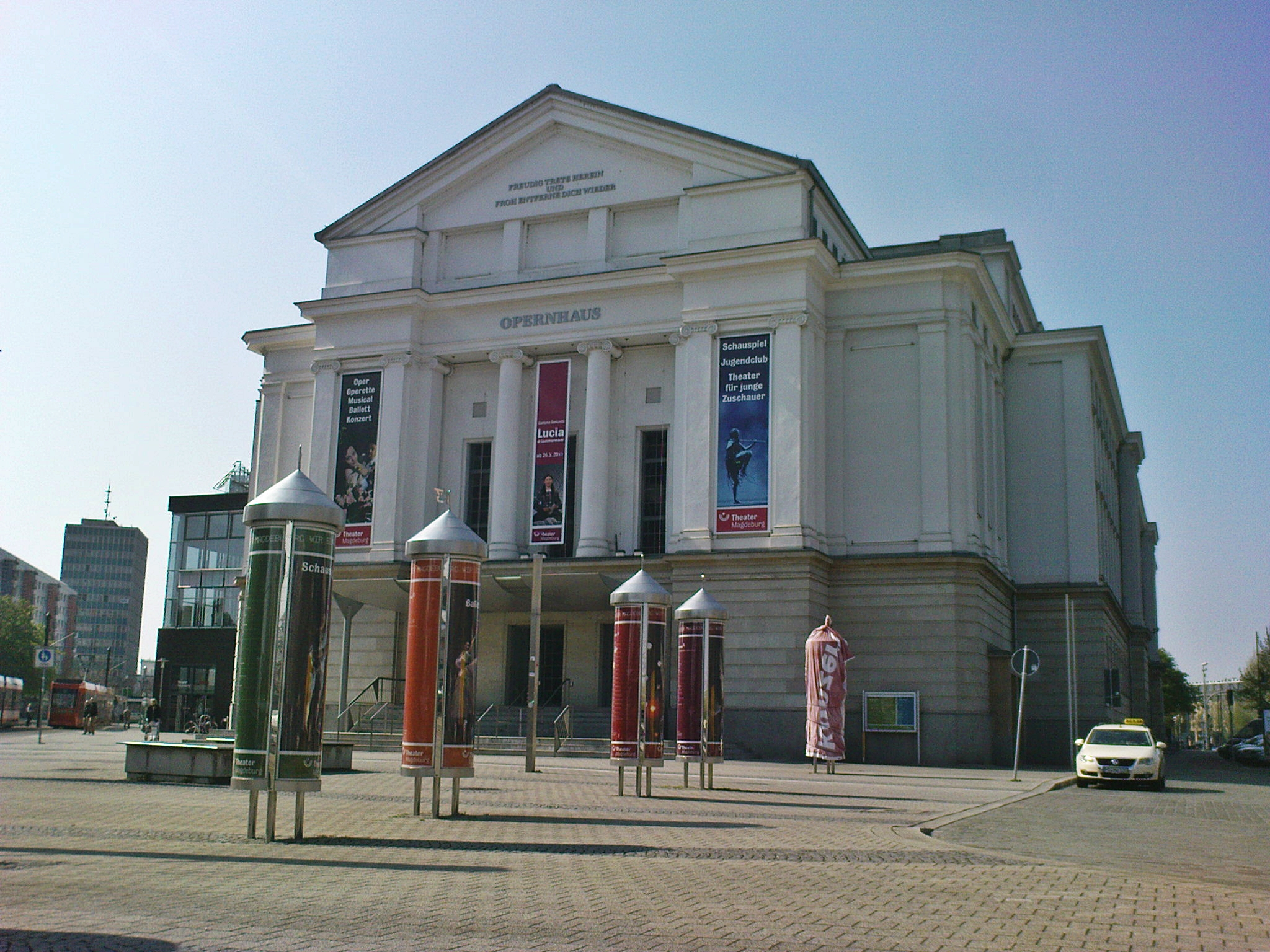
Opera house

Theater Magdeburg's opera house is located at 9 Universitätsplatz (52.1373°N 11.6386°E). The original theatre, known as the Centraltheater, was built in 1907 and was used as a venue for variety shows and from 1922 for operettas. The Centraltheater was destroyed during the World War II bombings and rebuilt after the war. It re-opened on 21 December 1951 as the Maxim Gorki Theater, named for the Russian playwright Maxim Gorki. In May 1990, shortly after German reunification began, a fire destroyed a large part of the stage. After an extensive project of rebuilding and renovation, the theatre reopened as the Theater der Landeshauptstadt (State Theatre).

Prior to World War II, the city's principal opera house had been the Stadttheater Magdeburg, which opened in 1876. It too was destroyed during the war, but was never rebuilt.

== Schauspielhaus ==
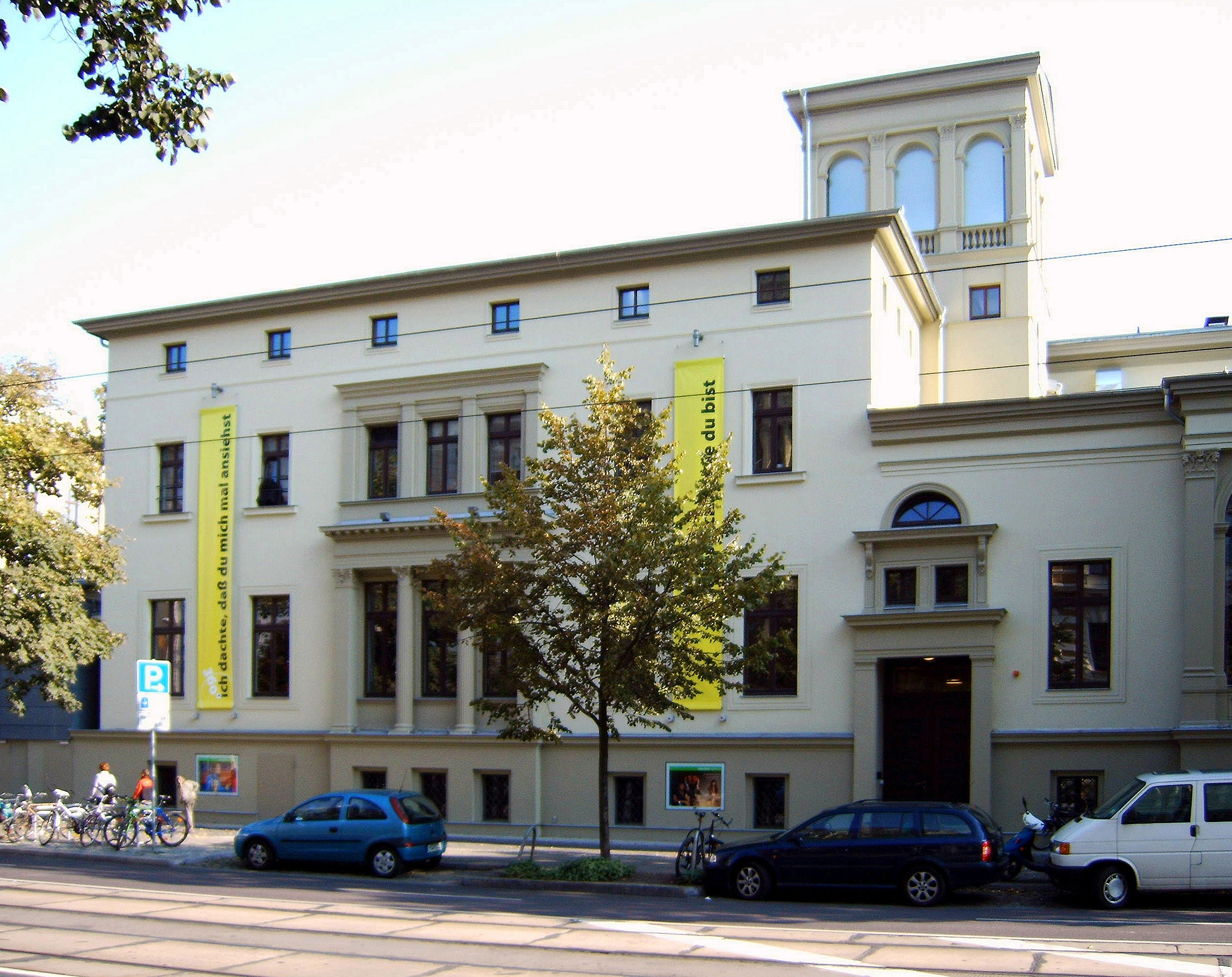
Playhouse

The playhouse is located at 64 Otto-von-Guericke-Straße (52°07′25″N 11°37′43″E). It was originally built as the Magdeburg residence of the industrialist Ferdinand Friedrich August Klusemann and known as the Villa Klusemann. In 1906 it was sold to the company Harmonie-Gesellschaft who converted into an exclusive venue for dancing, lectures, concerts, and social gatherings. It was occupied by American troops immediately after World War II and then converted into a provisional theatre for the city. From 1990 until its merger into Theater Magdeburg, it was known as the Freie Kammerspiele after its resident ensemble.

== DomplatzOpenAir ==
The DomplatzOpenAir is a temporary outdoor theatre (52°07′32″N 11°38′05″E) which hosts plays, musicals, operas and concerts during the months of June and July. It seats approximately 1200 people and is dismantled at the end of each summer season. Although it was first used with the name DomplatzOpenAir in 2007, its roots go back to the SommerNächte (Summer Nights) outdoor performances held by the Freie Kammerspiele.

== Administration ==
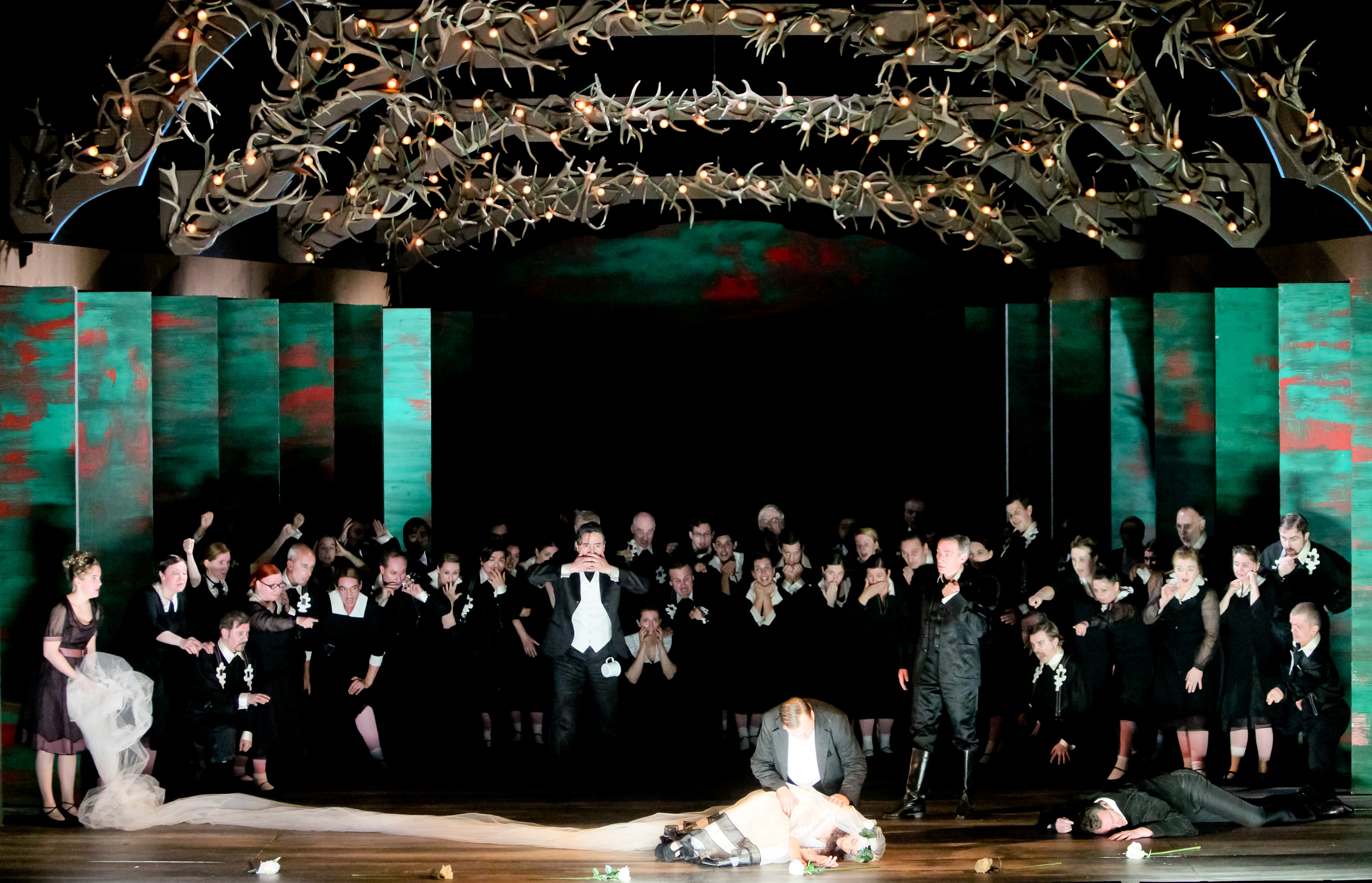
A scene from Weber's Der Freischütz in 2011

The first Intendant (General Director) of Theater Magdeburg after the merger was the German stage director Tobias Wellemeyer who served from 2004 to 2009. Prior to the merger he had been the artistic director of the Freie Kammerspiele. He was succeeded by Karen Stone, a British opera and stage director, who had previously been the artistic director of Dallas Opera. In 2017, her contract as Intendant was renewed through 2022. As from August 2022 on Julien Chavaz is the new General director.
