= My Leopold (play) =

My Leopold (German:Mein Leopold) is an 1873 sentimental comedy play by the German writer Adolphe L'Arronge. It is his best known work and has been adapted into films on several occasions.

== Bibliography ==
- Dennis Kennedy. The Oxford Companion to Theatre and Performance. OUP, 2010.
