= Adolphe L'Arronge =

German playwright and theatre director

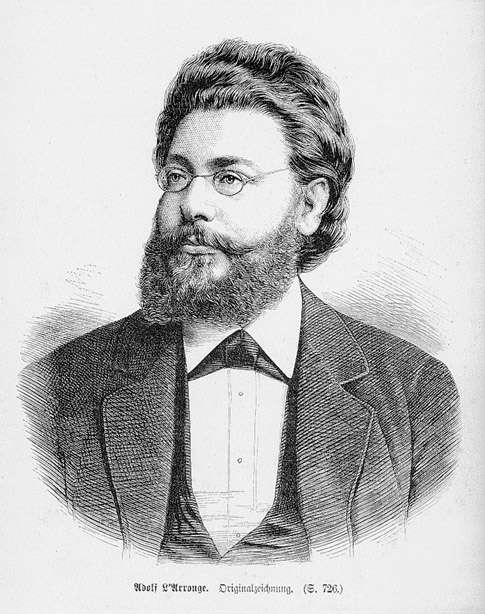
- Born: 8 March 1838; Hamburg, Germany
- Died: 25 May 1908 (aged 70); Kreuzlingen, German Empire
- Other name: Adolf Aaronsohn
- Occupations: Playwright, theatre director

Adolphe L'Arronge (8 March 1838 – 25 May 1908) was a German playwright and theatre director. His best known work is the 1873 comedy play My Leopold which has been adapted into numerous films.

== Selected works ==
- My Leopold (1873)
- Hasemann's Daughters (1877)
- The Lonei Household (1880)
