= German expressionist cinema =

German art movement during the 1910s–1930s

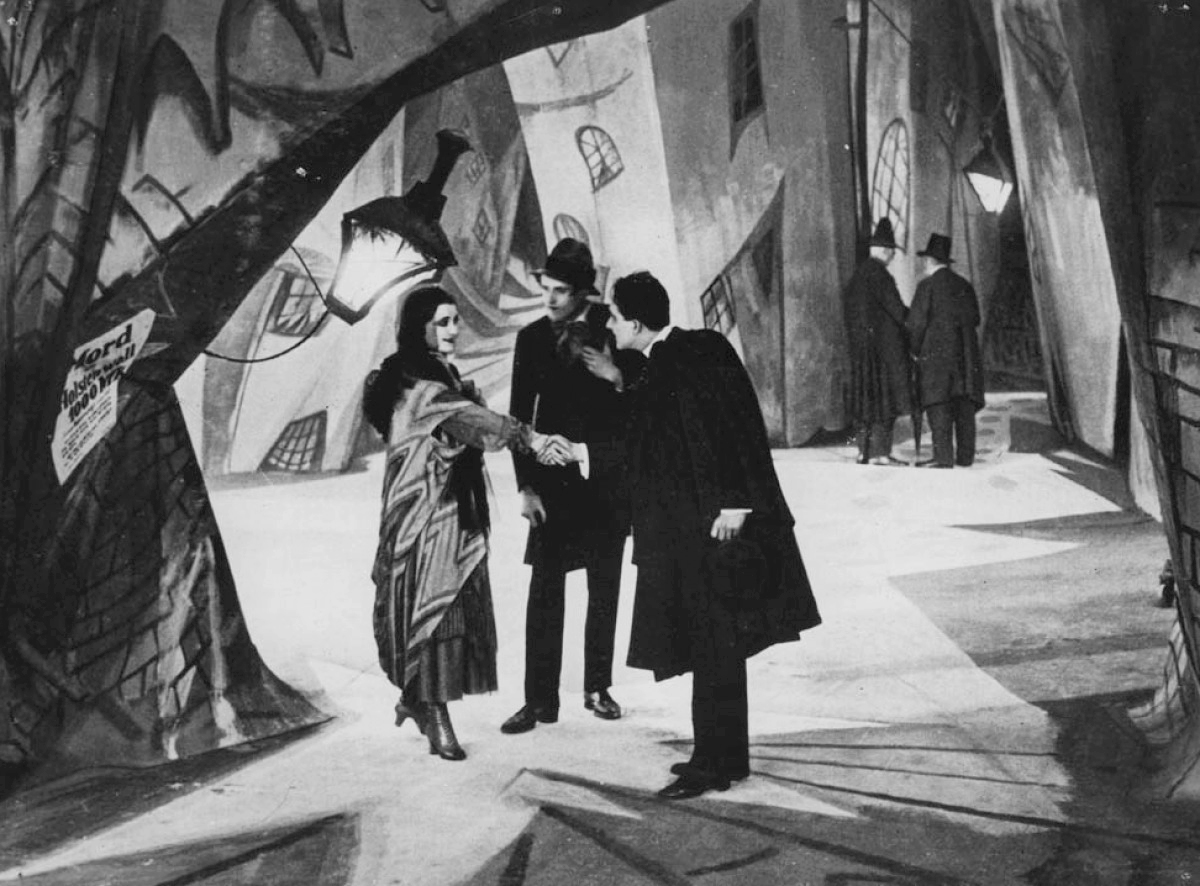
- A still of the distorted set design from the 1920 silent film The Cabinet of Dr. Caligari
- Years active: late 1910s – early 1930s
- Location: Germany
- Major figures: Fritz Lang; F. W. Murnau; Robert Wiene
- Influences: WWI's traumatic aftermath and the slowly dread-inducing Weimar Republic
- Influenced: Classical Hollywood cinema; film noir; gangster; horror; Kammerspiel; silent film

German expressionist cinema was a part of several related creative movements in Germany in the early 20th century that reached a peak in Berlin during the 1920s. These developments were part of a larger Expressionist movement in Northwestern European culture in fields such as architecture, dance, painting, sculpture and cinema.

== Characteristics ==
German Expressionism was an artistic movement in the early 20th century that emphasized the artist's inner emotions rather than attempting to replicate reality. German Expressionist films rejected cinematic realism and used visual distortions and hyper-expressive performances to reflect inner conflicts.

== History ==
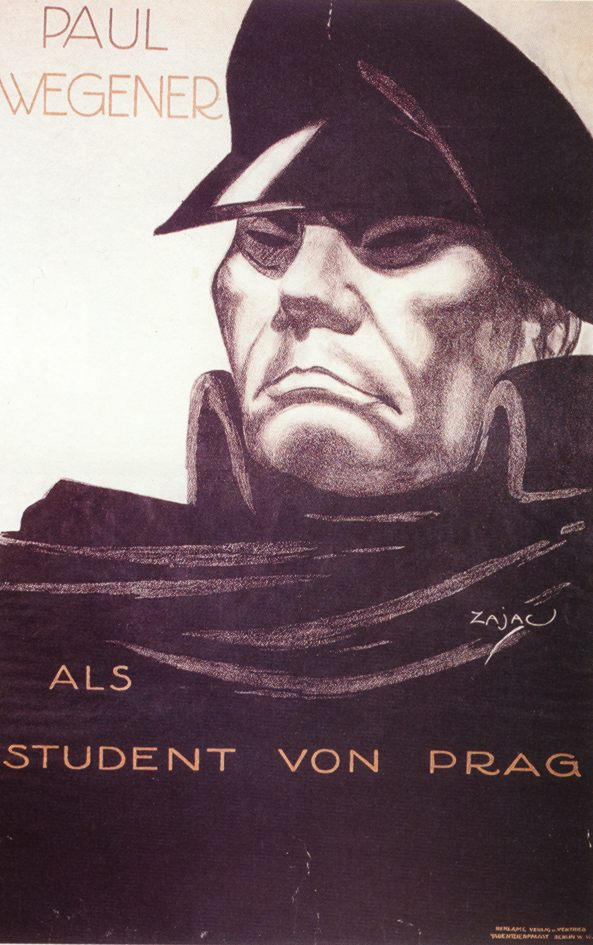
Paul Wegener as The Student of Prague in a 1913 poster

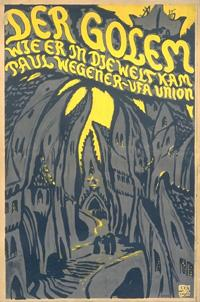
A poster for the 1920 silent film The Golem: How He Came into the World, starring and co-directed by Paul Wegener and Carl Boese

A still of Max Schreck in the 1922 silent film Nosferatu

A frame from director Arthur Robison's 1923 silent film Schatten – Eine nächtliche Halluzination (a.k.a., Warning Shadows)

The German Expressionist movement was initially confined to Germany due to the country's isolation during World War I. In 1916, the government banned foreign films, creating a sharp increase in the demand for domestic film production, from 24 films in 1914 to 130 films in 1918. With inflation also on the rise, Germans were attending films more freely because they knew that their money's value was constantly diminishing.

International audiences and appreciation for German cinema began to grow as anti-German sentiment decreased following the end of World War I. By the time its 1916 ban on imports of foreign films was lifted, Germany had become a part of the international film industry.

Among the first Expressionist films, The Student of Prague (1913), The Cabinet of Dr. Caligari (1920), From Morn to Midnight (1920), The Golem: How He Came into the World (1920), Genuine (1920), Destiny (1921), Nosferatu (1922), Phantom (1922), and Warning Shadows (1923) were highly symbolic and stylized.

European societies of the 1920s embraced an ethic of change and a willingness to look to the future by experimenting with bold new ideas and artistic styles. The first Expressionist films, which lacked a generous budget, used set designs with wildly non-realistic, geometrically absurd angles, along with designs painted on walls and floors to represent lights, shadows, and objects. The plots and stories of the Expressionist films often dealt with madness, insanity, betrayal and other "intellectual" topics triggered by the experiences of World War I (as opposed to standard action-adventure and romantic films). Later films often categorized as part of the brief history of German Expressionism include Metropolis (1927) and M (1931), both directed by Fritz Lang. This trend was a reaction against realism. Its practitioners used extreme distortions in expression to show an inner emotional reality rather than what was on the surface.

The extreme anti-realism of Expressionism was short-lived, fading away after only a few years. The themes of Expressionism were integrated into later films of the 1920s and 1930s, resulting in an artistic control over the placement of scenery, light, etc., to enhance the mood of a film. This dark, moody school of filmmaking was brought to the United States when the Nazis gained power and many German filmmakers emigrated to Hollywood. Several German directors and cameramen flourished in Hollywood, producing a repertoire of films that had a profound effect.

Two genres that were especially influenced by Expressionism are horror film and film noir. Carl Laemmle and Universal Studios had produced horror films of the silent era, such as Lon Chaney's The Phantom of the Opera. German filmmakers such as Karl Freund (the cinematographer for Dracula in 1931) set the style and mood of the Universal monster movies of the 1930s with their dark and artistically designed sets, providing a model for later generations of horror films. Directors such as Fritz Lang, Billy Wilder, Otto Preminger, Alfred Hitchcock, Orson Welles, Carol Reed and Michael Curtiz introduced the Expressionist style to crime dramas of the 1930s and 1940s, expanding Expressionism's influence on modern film making.

== Influence and legacy ==
German silent cinema was arguably far ahead of Hollywood during the same period. Cinema outside Germany benefited both from the emigration of German filmmakers and from German expressionist developments in style and technique that were apparent on the screen. The new look and techniques impressed other contemporary filmmakers, artists and cinematographers, and they began to incorporate the new style into their work.

In 1924, Alfred Hitchcock was sent by Gainsborough Pictures to work as an assistant director and art director at the UFA owned Babelsberg Studios in Potsdam near Berlin on the film The Blackguard. The immediate effect of the working environment in Germany can be seen in his expressionistic set designs for that film. Hitchcock later said he "acquired a strong German influence by working at the UFA studios".

German Expressionism would continue to influence Hitchcock throughout his career. In his third film, The Lodger, Hitchcock introduced expressionist set designs, lighting techniques, and trick camera work to the British public against the wishes of his studio. His visual experimentation included the use of an image of a man walking across a glass floor shot from below, a concept representing someone pacing upstairs.

Werner Herzog's 1979 film Nosferatu: Phantom der Nacht was a tribute to F. W. Murnau's 1922 film. The film uses expressionist techniques of highly symbolic acting and symbolic events to tell its story. The 1998 film Dark City used stark contrast, rigid movements, and fantastic elements.

Stylistic elements taken from German Expressionism are common today in films that need not reference contemporary realism, such as science fiction films (for example, Ridley Scott's 1982 film Blade Runner, which was itself influenced by Metropolis). Woody Allen's 1991 film Shadows and Fog is an homage to German and Austrian Expressionist filmmakers Fritz Lang, Georg Wilhelm Pabst and F. W. Murnau. The extreme angles of set decor and associated lighting were parodied by Ken Hughes in his Berlin spy school segment for the 1967 spoof version of Casino Royale.

== Set designs ==
Urban set design from Metropolis (1927)

Many critics see a direct tie between cinema and architecture of the time, stating that the sets and scene artwork of Expressionist films often reveal buildings of sharp angles, great heights, and crowded environments, such as the frequently shown Tower of Babel in Fritz Lang's Metropolis.

Strong elements of monumentalism and Modernism appear throughout the canon of German Expressionism. An excellent example of this is Metropolis, as evidenced by the enormous power plant and glimpses of the massive yet pristine "upper" city.

German Expressionist painters rejected the naturalistic depiction of objective reality, often portraying distorted figures, buildings, and landscapes in a disorienting manner that disregarded the conventions of perspective and proportion. This approach, combined with jagged, stylized shapes and harsh, unnatural colors, were used to convey subjective emotions.

A number of artists and craftsmen working in the Berlin theater brought the Expressionist visual style to the design of stage sets. This, in turn, had an eventual influence on films dealing with fantasy and horror.

The prime example is Robert Wiene's dream-like film The Cabinet of Dr. Caligari (1920) which is universally recognized as an early classic of Expressionist cinema. Hermann Warm, the film's art director, worked with painters and stage designers Walter Reimann and Walter Röhrig to create fantastic, nightmarish sets with twisted structures and landscapes with sharp-pointed forms and oblique, curving lines. Some of these designs were constructions, others were painted directly onto canvases.

German Expressionist films produced in the Weimar Republic immediately following the First World War not only encapsulate the sociopolitical contexts in which they were created, but also rework the intrinsically modern problems of self-reflexivity, spectacle and identity.

According to Siegfried Kracauer and Lotte Eisner, German Expressionist cinema operates as a kind of collective consciousness and a symptomatic manifestation of what they polemically claim to be inherent cultural tendencies of the German nation. Expressionism has also been described as focusing on the "power of spectacles" and offering audiences "a kind of metonymic image of their own situation".

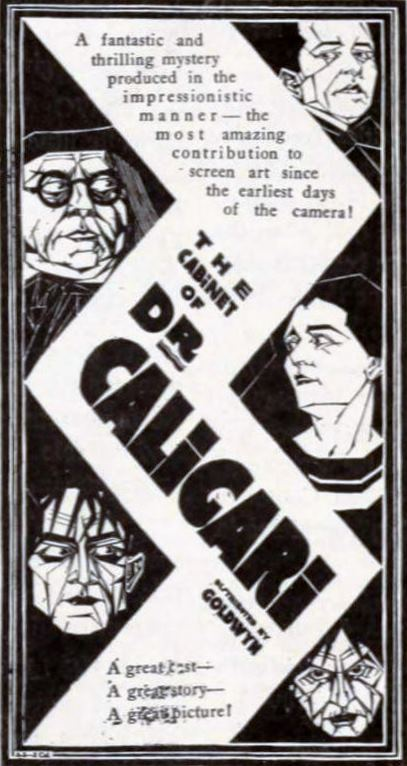
American newspaper ad for the German film The Cabinet of Dr. Caligari (1920) from the Goldwyn Pictures press book

This film movement paralleled Expressionist painting and theater in rejecting realism. The creators in the Weimar Period sought to convey inner, subjective experience through external, objective means. Their films were characterized by highly stylized sets and acting; they used a new visual style which embodied high contrast and simple editing. The films were shot in studios where they could employ deliberately exaggerated and dramatic lighting and camera angles to emphasize some particular affect – fear, horror, pain. Aspects of Expressionist techniques were later adapted by such directors as Alfred Hitchcock and Orson Welles and were incorporated into many American gangster and horror films. Some of the major filmmakers of this time were F. W. Murnau, Erich Pommer, and Fritz Lang. The movement ended after the currency stabilized, making it cheaper to buy movies abroad. The UFA financially collapsed and German studios began to deal with Italian studios which led to their influence in style of horror and films noirs. The American influence on the film industry would also lead some film makers to continue their career in the US. The UFA's last film was Der blaue Engel (1930), considered a masterpiece of German Expressionism.

== Interpretation ==
The two most comprehensive studies of German Expressionist film are Lotte Eisner's The Haunted Screen and Siegfried Kracauer's From Caligari to Hitler. Kracauer examines German cinema from the Silent/Golden Era to support the (controversial) conclusion that German films made prior to Hitler's takeover and the rise of the Third Reich all hint at the inevitability of Nazi Germany. For Eisner, similarly, German Expressionist cinema is a visual manifestation of Romantic ideals turned to dark and proto-totalitarian ends. More recent German Expressionist scholars examine historical elements influencing German Expressionism, such as the Weimar economy, UFA, Erich Pommer, Nordisk, and Hollywood.

== Literature on the subject ==
- John D. Barlow: German Expressionist Film. Boston 1982, ISBN 0805792848.
- Rudolf Kurtz: Expressionism and Film. Berlin 1926. Reprint Zurich 2007 (Chronos), edited and with an afterword by Christian Kiening and Ulrich Johannes Beil, 224 pp.: Ill. ISBN 978-3-0340-0874-7.
- Jürgen Kasten: The expressionist film. Münster (MakS) 1990, ISBN 3-88811-546-9.
- Leonardo Quaresima: Expressionism as a film genre. In: Uli Jung, Walter Schatzberg (eds.): Film culture during the Weimar Republic. Munich, London, New York, Paris 1992, pp. 174–195, ISBN 3-598-11042-1.
- Gould, M. (1976). Surrealism and the cinema: Open-eyed screening. A. S. Barnes, pp. 177 Illustrated ISBN 0-498-01498-3.
- Daniela Sannwald: Expressionist Film Art. Dream and Trauma, in: The German Film. 1895 to the present day (Exhibition catalogue for the exhibition of the same name at the Völklinger Hütte World Heritage Site), ed. by Ralf Beil, Rainer Rother, pp. 58–79, Sandstein Verlag, 2024, ISBN 978-3-95498-787-0.
- Sabine Hake: Film in Germany. History and stories since 1895 (Rowohlt's Encyclopedia), Reinbek near Hamburg 2004, pp. 57–108, ISBN 3-499-55663-4.
- Christer Petersen: Expressionist Film, in: The Lexicon of Film Terms (Kiel University), online at Expressionist Film [The Lexicon of Film Terms] (uni-kiel.de)
- Kristin Eichhorn, Johannes S. Lorenzen (eds.): Expressionism Debate(s). (Expressionism 07/2018). Neofelis Verlag, Berlin 2018, ISBN 978-3-95808-152-9. [7th issue of the journal series Expressionism, published semi-annually in 19 volumes since 2015 ]
