= John Gottowt =

Austrian actor

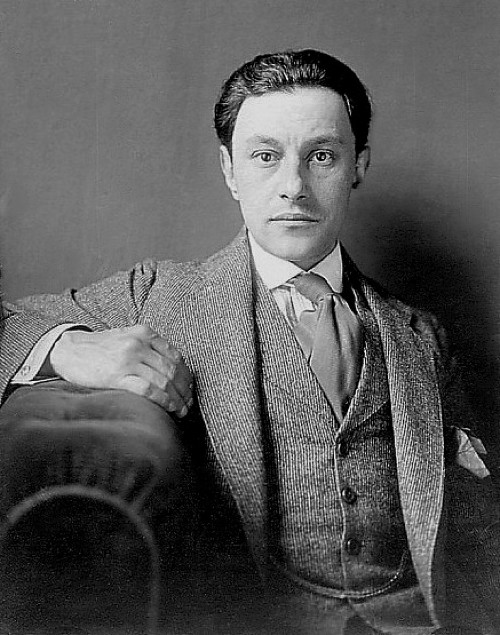
- John Gottowt c. 1918
- Born: Isidor Gesang; 15 June 1881; Lemberg, Austria-Hungary
- Died: 29 August 1942 (aged 61); Wieliczka, Nazi-occupied Poland
- Occupation: Actor
- Years active: 1913–1933

John Gottowt (born Isidor Gesang; 15 June 1881 – 29 August 1942) was an Austrian actor, stage director and film director for theatres and silent movies.

Gottowt was born in Lemberg, Austria-Hungary (present-day Lviv, Ukraine) into a Jewish family. After his education in Vienna, he joined the Deutsches Theater in Berlin in 1905, working for Max Reinhardt as an actor and director. Gottowt was mainly active in different theatres in Berlin as a character actor and director.

His first silent film appearance was in Paul Wegener’s Der Student von Prag ("The Student of Prague") (1913). In 1920 he appeared in Robert Wiene's Genuine and took the main role in the early science fiction film Algol. In 1921 he played Professor Bulwer (Abraham van Helsing) in the classic silent film Nosferatu directed by F.W. Murnau.

Gottowt made also several films with his brother-in-law Henrik Galeen but, as a Jew, was banned in 1933 from working as a professional actor. After a few years in Denmark he moved to Kraków in Poland. He was murdered in 1942 by an SS officer while in hiding in Wieliczka, disguised as a Roman Catholic priest.

== List of films ==
John Gottowt as Professor Bulwer in Nosferatu (1922)

- Der Student von Prag (1913, directed by Stellan Rye), as Scapinelli
- Das schwarze Los / Pierrots letztes Abenteuer (1913, directed by John Gottowt & Emil Albes), as Brighella
- Die büßende Magdalena (1915, directed by Emil Albes)
- Satan Opium (1915, directed by Siegfried Dessauer)
- The Princess of Neutralia (1917, directed by Rudolf Biebrach), as Joe Vandergolt, billionaire
- Peer Gynt. 1. Peer Gynts Jugend (1918, directed by Victor Barnowsky), as Dovregubben
- Peer Gynt 2. Wanderjahre und Tod (1918, directed by Victor Barnowsky), as Dovregubben
- Morphium (1919, directed by Bruno Ziener)
- Der rote Henker (1919, directed by Rudolf Biebrach), as L'Angely, court jester
- The Forbidden Way (1920, directed by Henrik Galeen), as Lucas
- Genuine (1920, directed by Robert Wiene), as Guyard, barber
- The Night of Queen Isabeau (1920, directed by Robert Wiene), as humpbacked court jester
- Der Bucklige und die Tänzerin (1920, directed by F.W. Murnau), as James Wilton
- Niemand weiß es (1920, directed by Lupu Pick) - Screenwriter
- Algol (1920, directed by Hans Werckmeister), as alien from the planet Algol
- Die tote Stunde (1920, directed by Friedrich Feher)
- Parisian Women (1921, directed by Leo Lasko), as Aristide
- Burning Country (1921, directed by Heinz Herald), as Wladislaus
- Susanne Stranzky (1921, directed by Otto Rippert)
- Nosferatu, eine Symphonie des Grauens (1922, directed by F.W. Murnau), as Professor Bulwer (van Helsing)
- The Black Star (1922, directed by James Bauer)
- Elixiere des Teufels (1922, directed by Adolf Abter)
- The False Dimitri (1922, directed by Hans Steinhoff), as Ivan's court jester
- The Money Devil (1923, directed by Heinz Goldberg), as Black
- Waxworks (1923, directed by Paul Leni), as the wax museum's owner
- Menschenopfer (1923, directed by Carl Wilhelm)
- Should We Be Silent? (1926, directed by Richard Oswald), as the doctor's assistant
- The Flight in the Night (1926, directed by Amleto Palermi), as a servant
- Prinz Louis Ferdinand (1927, directed by Hans Behrendt), as newspaper editor
- Unheimliche Geschichten (1932, directed by Richard Oswald), as official of the mechanic museum
