= The Brothers Karamazov (1931 film) =

1931 film

- Directed by: Fedor Ozep
- Written by: Leonhard Frank; Fyodor Otsep; Victor Trivas; Paul d'Estournelles de Constant
- Based on: The Brothers Karamazov by Fyodor Dostoevsky
- Starring: Fritz Kortner; Anna Sten; Hanna Waag
- Cinematography: Nicolas Farkas
- Music by: Karol Rathaus; Kurt Schröder
- Production company: Pathé-Natan
- Distributed by: Pathé-Natan
- Release date: 1931
- Running time: 85 minutes
- Country: France
- Language: French

The Brothers Karamazov (French: Les frères Karamazoff) is a 1931 French drama film directed by Fedor Ozep and starring Fritz Kortner, Anna Sten and Hanna Waag. It was produced by Pathé-Natan as the French-language version of the German film The Murderer Dimitri Karamazov. It is based on the novel The Brothers Karamazov by Fyodor Dostoevsky. The film's sets were designed by the art director Jean Perrier.

== Cast ==
- Fritz Kortner as Dimitri Karamazoff
- Anna Sten as Grouschenka
- Hanna Waag as Katia
- Fritz Rasp as Smerdiakoff
- Max Pohl as Le père Karamazoff
- Héléna Manson as Fénia
- Aimé Clariond as Ivan Karamazoff
- André Dubosc as Le procureur

== Bibliography ==
- Goble, Alan. The Complete Index to Literary Sources in Film. Walter de Gruyter, 1999.
- Parish, James Robert. Film Actors Guide: Western Europe. Scarecrow Press, 1977.
