= The Strongest Instinct =

1922 film

- Directed by: Karl Grune
- Release date: 1922
- Country: Germany
- Languages: Silent; German intertitles

The Strongest Instinct (German:Der stärkste Trieb) is a 1922 German silent film directed by Karl Grune. Certain sources indicate 1923 as release date. The cast includes Erika Gläßner, Fritz Schultz, Fritz Kortner, Rudolf Forster, Henry Bender, Frieda Richard.

It could the same film as Karl Grune's Die Jagd nach der Wahrheit (1921) with Fritz Kortner and Rudolf Forster.

== Premise ==
In a dream, a woman sees herself on trial for poisoning.

== Bibliography ==
- James Robert Parish & Kingsley Canham. Film Directors Guide: Western Europe. Scarecrow Press, 1976.
