= Grete Berger =

Austrian-German actress (1883–1944)

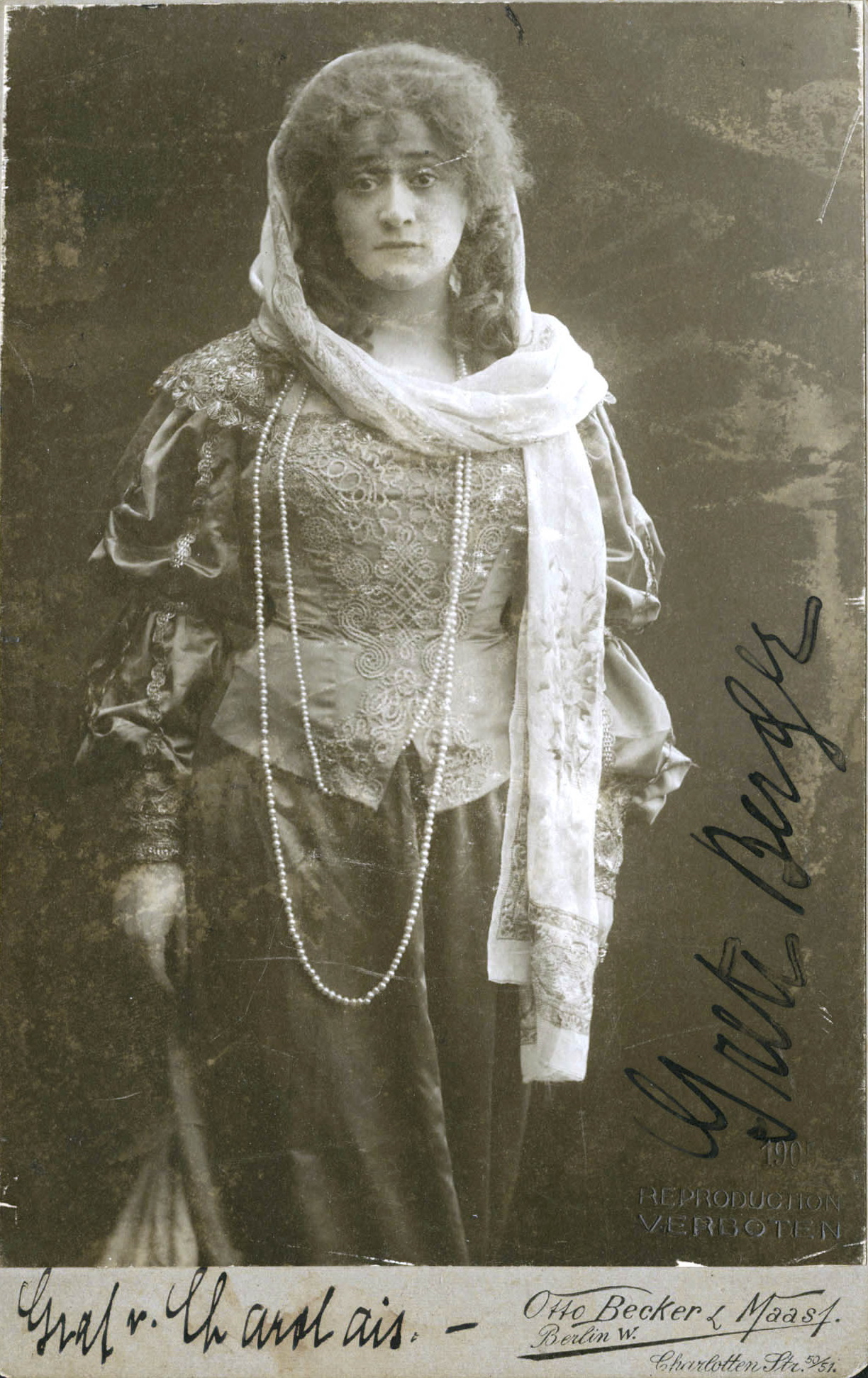
- Berger, ca. 1905
- Born: Margarethe Berg; 11 February 1883; Jägerndorf, Austrian Silesia, Cisleithania, Austria-Hungary
- Died: 24 May 1944 (aged 61); Auschwitz, German-occupied Poland
- Occupation: Actress
- Years active: 1902–1930

Grete Berger (born Margarethe Berg; 11 February 1883 – 23 May 1944) was an Austrian-German stage and film actress whose career came to an end following the rise of the Nazi Party in 1933. Berger was murdered at Auschwitz concentration camp in 1944 shortly after her arrival.

== Career ==
Grete Berger was born Margarethe Berg into a Jewish family in Austrian Silesia. She began her education under acting teacher Rosa Roth in Vienna. She made her stage debut on 1 September 1903 in Berlin at the Deutsches Theater. In 1904 she began an engagement at the Deutsches Theater under theatre director and pedagogue Max Reinhardt where she performed in youthful character roles. In 1911 she performed with Reinhardt's ensemble in Sophocles's Oedipus Rex on guest tours of Prague and St. Petersburg. Other notable roles in Berlin included Puck in Shakespeare's A Midsummer Night's Dream, the title role of Hugo von Hofmannsthal's drama Elektra, Désirée in Richard Beer-Hofmann's The Count of Charolais, Marikke in Hermann Sudermann's Johannisfeuer, and Rahel in Franz Grillparzer's The Jewess of Toledo.

In 1913 and 1914 she appeared in front of the camera for several silent films and became known as the female lead of the Comtess Margit Schwarzenberg in the 1913 Stellan Rye and Paul Wegener-directed horror film The Student of Prague. Stellan Rye would also cast her in several other of his films, including several other horror films penned by Berger's then-romantic partner Hanns Heinz Ewers. Following the outbreak of World War I in 1914, Berger returned to the stage. During the 1920s, she was cast in a number of films, including multiple roles in films directed by Fritz Lang. After her last film, The Land Without Women in 1929, Berger was no longer employed in the industry.

== Nazi persecution and death ==
The accession of power by the National Socialists in 1933 and the implementation of anti-Semitic laws and restrictions meant the end of Berger's career. She later fled with her husband to Italy, where she was arrested by the German occupation authorities in the course of a general hunt for Jews on 7 April 1944 in San Donato Val di Comino, near Rome. Their deportation to a National Socialist concentration camp was scheduled for 10 April 1944. She was transferred to the Jewish collection and transit camp Fossoli near Carpi. There she met her longtime colleague from Reinhardt's Deutsches Theater German Theater, Jacob Feldhammer. From Fossoli, the German occupying forces deported both actors on 16 May 1944 to the Auschwitz concentration camp, where Berger and Feldhammer were murdered shortly after their arrival on 23 May 1944.

== Selected filmography ==
- The Student of Prague (1913)
- Die Augen des Ole Brandis (1913)
- People in Ecstasy (1921)
- The Secrets of Berlin (1921)
- Dr. Mabuse the Gambler (1922)
- Phantom (1922)
- Madame de La Pommeraye's Intrigues (1922)
- The Green Manuela (1923)
- The Stone Rider (1923)
- The Ancient Law (1923)
- The Assmanns (1925)
- Eternal Allegiance (1926)
- Metropolis (1927)
- Spies (1928)
- Land Without Women (1929)

== Bibliography ==
- Eisner, Lotte H. The Haunted Screen: Expressionism in the German Cinema and the Influence of Max Reinhardt. University of California Press, 2008.
