= The Love Trap =

The Love Trap may refer to:

- The Love Trap (1923 film), an American film
- The Love Trap (1925 film), a German film
- The Love Trap (1929 film), an American film
- Love Trap (1940 film), an Italian film
- Love Trap (2004 film), a Dutch romantic comedy film
