= The Big Light =

1920 film

- Directed by: Hanna Henning
- Written by: Hanna Henning; Felix Philippi (play)
- Starring: Hermann Böttcher; Wilhelm Diegelmann; Emil Jannings
- Cinematography: Otto Tober
- Release date: 7 May 1920
- Country: Germany
- Languages: Silent; German intertitles

The Big Light (German: Das große Licht) is a 1920 German silent film directed by Hanna Henning and starring Hermann Böttcher, Wilhelm Diegelmann, and Emil Jannings.

The art direction was by Hans Sohnle.

== Cast ==
In alphabetical order

- Hermann Böttcher as Prof. Marquard
- Wilhelm Diegelmann as Stiftsherr Burghaber
- Emil Jannings as Lorenz Ferleitner
- Albert Patry as Dr. Sellnitz
- Max Pohl as Goldner
- Frida Richard as Frau Rasmussen
- Karl Rückert as General a. D. von Schönherr
- Margarete Schön
- Kurt Vespermann as Fritz Rasmussen

== Bibliography ==
- Nelmes, Jill; Selbo, Jule, eds. (2015). Women Screenwriters: An International Guide. Basingstoke: Palgrave Macmillan. ISBN 978-1-137-31236-5.
