= Die Augen des Ole Brandis =

- Directed by: Stellan Rye
- Written by: Hanns Heinz Ewers
- Starring: Alexander Moissi; Lothar Körner; Grete Berger
- Cinematography: Guido Seeber
- Production company: Deutsche Bioscop
- Distributed by: Greenbaum-Film; Box Office Attractions Company
- Release dates: 14 December 1913 (Vienna, Austria); 9 January 1914 (Germany)
- Running time: 52 minutes
- Country: Germany
- Languages: Silent; German intertitles; English translated intertitles

Die Augen des Ole Brandis is a fantasy silent film directed by Stellan Rye, written by Hanns Heinz Ewers, and starring Alexander Moissi, Lothar Korner and Grete Berger. The film was released on 14 December 1913, in Vienna, Austria and 9 January 1914, in Berlin, Germany and has since been lost.

Die Augen des Ole Brandis is centered around the idea of a magically enhanced letter given to the titular character, Brandis, providing said character the ability to see inside people's souls, allowing him to see them as they really are, by simply waving the paper over his eyes before looking at the individual in question.

One of the themes of this work seems to be to not "judge a book, by its cover", and that people aren't always internally, who they claim to be, or look like externally, hence, one should be mindful of the close friends that they keep around them as a result.

== Synopsis ==
The plot of Old Brandis' Eyes, according to the manuscript submitted to the Library of Congress on 12 May 1914, by Jacques Greenzweig, is that Old Brandis is a very successful young painter living in Italy, who is surrounded by many friends and admirers, who adore him because of the man's wealth. As the story begins, Brandis is painting a Madonna and Child from a still life inspiration of a young, peasant girl named, Ulla. Ulla, is described, by the manuscript, as being a "...fresh, unspoiled girl from the people...", and Brandis is attempting to convey through his painting the characteristic expression of her eyes, but when he does not succeed he is left sullen and desperate. After almost throwing away his brush and palette, Brandis puts the attempted painting in a corner of his home, and walks away, not noticing that Coppilander, a repulsive looking, antiques dealer is watching him and his painting closely. Once Brandis leaves, Coppilander swoops in and steals his painting from his home without Brandis noticing.

Searching in vain for the painting all over throughout his home, Brandis becomes very upset by its disappearance from where he had left it. It isn't until later on, when he discovers the painting at Coppilander's house, that he is reawakened from his emotional stupor. Demanding his painting back from Coppilander, Brandis is unfazed by the man's offers to buy it off of him for any amount at all, as Brandis already has enough money. Coppilander, however, is persistent in acquiring Brandis' painting for himself, and tries to formulate another type of exchange, instead of money for the artwork.

Offering Brandis anything he wants from the world, Coppilander inspires the artist to think about what he truly desires out of life. Thinking hard for a few moments, Brandis agrees to give Coppilander his painting on the condition that Coppilander can provide him with what he truly desires out of life, the ability to see people as they really are, and not as they present themselves to the world at large. Able to grant this request, by supernatural means, Coppilander gives Brandis a letter with the instructions to "Run this letter over your eyes and see people as they really are!". Amused, but not fully believing Coppilander's promises, Brandis takes the letter in exchange for his painting, and leaves Coppilander's home to go on with his affairs.

Later on, Brandis meets with Lady Clara de Vere, his fiancée in the park. A daily routine for the two, Brandis views Lady Clara with "... delight (at) her youth ad beauty...", but has always held a sinking feeling that she isn't as beautiful on the inside. At the breakfast table, while sitting across from Lady Clara, Brandis remembers the letter that Coppilander gave him, and proceeds to test it on his fiancée. Running the letter over his eyes as he looks at Lady Clara, Brandis is shocked to discover that she transforms from her youthful, beauty into an ugly maid with a knitted stocking in her hands and an unpleasant-looking dog in her lap. Horrified, Brandis jumps up out of fear and flees his fiancée as a result.

After some time has passed, Brandis decides to spend some time with his close friend, Smirnov, at an osteria. As the two drink chianti, Smirnov confides in Brandis that he is having financial troubles, and asks Brandis for a loan of a several thousand marks. Willing to help his friend, Brandis reaches into his wallet to get some money for him, before noticing the letter that he received from Coppilander. Close with his friend, but still unsure of his soul, Brandis decides to use Coppilander's letter again, and discovers that who he thought his friend was, was just a facade. Transformed from his elegant, close associate persona, Smirnov appears before Brandis as a criminal, who is looking at Brandis' money with greedy lust, in his hand, a straw that the man was playing with before, has transformed into a dagger, and on his face, the friendliness that he was displaying has been replaced with a looking of deception. Turning away from him in disgust, Brandis leaves his friend behind and exits the osteria in a haste.

Running into Marga Hendrichs some time later, Brandis is taken aback by her seductive behavior, unaware that she is attempting to use him to gain access to his wealth. In competition with Lady Clara de Vere over the heart of Brandis, Marga wants to marry him because he is rich and famous, and not out of any actual love and affection for the man. Tempted to use Coppilander's letter again, Brandis tests Marga's soul against the letter, just as he did Lady Clara and Smirnov, and finds out that, she too, is a false persona. Changing form before his eyes, Marga becomes a prostitute, whose face is described as baring "...mean (and) base passions...", forcing Brandis to flee from her presence as well.

In his flight from Marga, Brandis passes by Coppilander, who smirks at him with a mocking expression of derision at the man's current predicament. Using the letter on him, Brandis waves it over his eyes, and discovers that the letter's creator, has transformed into a thief, who holds a grinning, devil-looking face, as he stares right back at Brandis.

Defeated and discouraged by the reveals, Brandis returns home and meets with the famed art scholar, Petersen, a talkative gentleman who explains his latest theory about art to him. Brandis however, once more unsure of who he is on the inside, is inclined to use the letter on him as a reflex. Moving the letter over his eyes in response to his suspicions, Brandis sees Petersen transform into a harlequin clown, who is holding and caressing a monkey in his hands, instead of the knowledgeable scholar, who was just before holding a book and talking to him intellectually.

Utterly disgusted, and completely incredulous to the idea that people's souls are reflective of their external personas, Brandis retreats to his studio in a gloomy mood and desperate mood. In his head, he considers committing suicide to rid himself of his newly acquired dubitation of all of his friends and acquaintances, before his eyes fall upon a mirror in the room. Bitterly smiling at his reflection, Brandis uses Coppilander's letter on himself, determined to see his own soul before dying.Waving the letter over his eyes, Brandis witnesses his reflection turn into that of an old, broken man who has given up on everything in life, prompting him to finalize his decision to end his life.

Rummaging through his belongings, Brandis grabs a sharp edged dagger and points it at his chest, intending to stab himself, until Ulla arrives to stop him. Rushing into the room, Ulla wrests the dagger from Brandis, injuring herself in the process. Feeling guilty, Brandis treats her wound and realizes in astonishment, by looking into her eyes, that she is in love with him. However, his mistrust of people overwhelms his ability to think clearly, and in response, Brandis takes out Coppilander's letter and waves it over his eyes to see Ulla's inner soul.

To his surprise though, Ulla remains the same, unchanged, no matter how much Brandis uses the letter on her, she isn't spoiled by machinations of Coppilander. The revelation of this, prompts Brandis to breathe in response, as he realizes that maybe not all of his friends and acquaintances are as bereft of internal character as Coppilander's letter portrayed them as, and that there are some people he can trust as being as beautiful on the inside as they are on the outside. Taking Ulla in his arms, Brandis celebrates his restored faith in humanity.

Following this celebration, Brandis begins a new life with Ulla regaining his strength and youth as he revels in the purity and joy of his newly discovered love.

== Premiere ==
The film was initially released in Vienna, Austria on 14 December 1913, at the Burgkino movie theater, according to the Neue Freie Presse, "The premieres of the week... Burgkino...Ole Brandis' Eyes. Dramatic comedy by Hanns Heinz Ewers.*".

It premiered in Germany on 9 January 1914, to honor the reopening of the U.T. Lichtespiele in Berlin's Alexanderplatz amusement park, according to the book Hanns Heinz Ewers und der Phantastic film by Reinhold Keiner.

The film would not release in the United States until August 1914, according to information provided by IMDb's profile on the film.

== Reception ==
The screenwriter, Hanns Heinz Ewers, regarded the lead actor, Alexander Moissi's performance in this film with disappointment, "I'm flickering here with Alexander Moissi and i.v. Moissi is the most horrible tenor you can imagine, completely unintelligible and stupid, it is torture to work like that".

The film journal Der Kinematograph, stated that, "...after the premiere, which took place on 9 January 1914, on the occasion of the reopening of the U.-T.-Lichtspiele' on Berlin's Alexanderplatz, the review praised not only the wonderful nature shots, but also the excellent acting of the actors and especially that of Alexander Moissi-he lends Ole Brandis the charm of his personality."

The production company, Deutsche Bioscop-Gesellschaft, was also very pleased with the film stating in a booklet accompanying its premiere that the "... inherently brittle material, which places the highest artistic demands on all actors, was handled by Moissi in such a way that the psychological impossibilities appear possible and logical to the viewer", statements that praise Moissi, but are critical of Ewer's writing for the film.
