= Students' Love =

1927 film

- Directed by: Robert Land
- Written by: Alfred Schirokauer; Curt Wesse
- Produced by: Josef Stein
- Starring: Fritz Kortner; Agnes Straub; Wolfgang Zilzer
- Cinematography: Willy Goldberger
- Music by: Walter Ulfig
- Production company: Domo-Strauß-Film
- Release date: 3 June 1927
- Running time: 92 minutes
- Country: Germany
- Languages: Silent; German intertitles

Students' Love (German: Primanerliebe) is a 1927 German silent drama film directed by Robert Land and starring Fritz Kortner, Agnes Straub and Wolfgang Zilzer. It was shot at the Halensee Studios in Berlin. The film's sets were designed by the art director Erich Zander.

== Cast ==
- Fritz Kortner as Karsten
- Agnes Straub as Frau Karsten
- Wolfgang Zilzer as Rolf Karsten
- Jaro Fürth as Frank
- Grete Mosheim as Ellen
- Jakob Tiedtke as Sommer
- Emmy Flemmich as Frau Sommer
- Teddy Bill as Teddy
- Martin Herzberg as Max Hohlweg
- Paul Otto as Rektor
- Hans Rameau
- Adolphe Engers as Teacher
- Margarete Lanner
- Hans Albers as Operasinger Blasiera
- Eugen Jensen as Judge
- Rudolf Lettinger

== Bibliography ==
- Matthias Wegner. Hans Albers. Ellert & Richter, 2005.
