= Hanna Henning =

German film director, producer and screenwriter

- Born: 16 August 1884; Stuttgart, German Empire
- Died: January 9, 1925 (aged 40); Berlin, Germany
- Occupations: Film director Film producer Screenwriter
- Years active: 1915–1921

Hanna Henning (1884–1925) was a German film director, producer and screenwriter. She was the most prominent and prolific women director working in the German film industry during the silent era.

== Selected filmography ==
- Bubi Is Jealous (1916)
- Under the Spell of Silence (1916)
- Poor Little Helga (1918)
- Triumph of Life (1919)
- The Seventeen-Year-Olds (1919)
- The Big Light (1920)
- The Fear of Women (1921)
- The Demon of Kolno (1921)
- On the Red Cliff (1922)

== Bibliography ==
- Foster, Gwendolyn Audrey. Women Film Directors: An International Bio-critical Dictionary. Greenwood Publishing Group, 1995.
