= The Master of Nuremberg =

1927 film

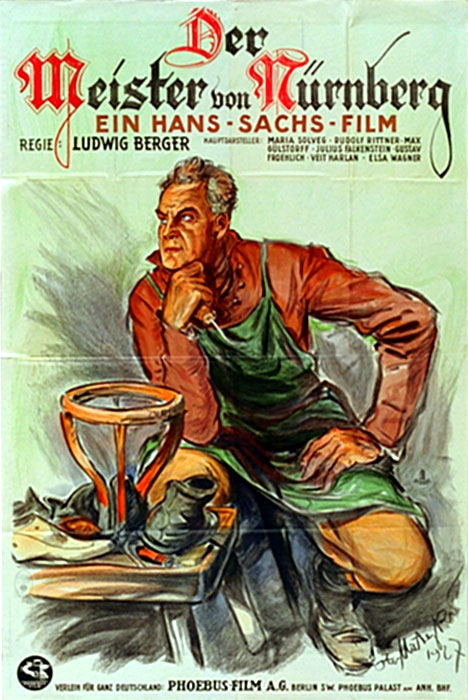
- Poster
- Directed by: Ludwig Berger
- Written by: Ludwig Berger; Robert Liebmann; Rudolf Rittner
- Based on: Die Meistersinger von Nürnberg by Richard Wagner
- Starring: Rudolf Rittner; Max Gülstorff; Gustav Fröhlich; Julius Falkenstein
- Cinematography: Axel Graatkjær; Karl Puth
- Music by: Willy Schmidt-Gentner
- Production company: Phoebus Film
- Distributed by: Phoebus Film
- Release date: 5 September 1927
- Country: Germany
- Languages: Silent; German intertitles

The Master of Nuremberg (German: Der Meister von Nürnberg) is a 1927 German silent historical comedy film directed by Ludwig Berger and starring Rudolf Rittner, Max Gülstorff and Gustav Fröhlich. It is based on the 1868 opera Die Meistersinger von Nürnberg by Richard Wagner. It was considered artistically unsuccessful because of its overly theatrical presentation. It is also known by the alternative title The Meistersinger.

The film's sets were designed by the art director Rudolf Bamberger.

After completing the film Berger emigrated to work in Hollywood, although he later returned to Germany.

== Cast ==
Rudolf Rittner in a scene from the film

- Rudolf Rittner as Hans Sachs
- Max Gülstorff as Veit Pogner
- Gustav Fröhlich as Walter von Stolzing
- Julius Falkenstein as Beckmesser
- Veit Harlan as David
- Maria Matray
- Elsa Wagner
- Hans Wassmann
- Hermann Picha

== Bibliography ==
- Hermanni, Horst O. Von Dorothy Dandridge bis Willy Fritsch: Das Film ABC, Volume 2. Books on Demand, 2009.
- Manvell, Robert. Experiment in the Film. Arno Press, 1949.
