= The Burning Heart (film) =

1929 film

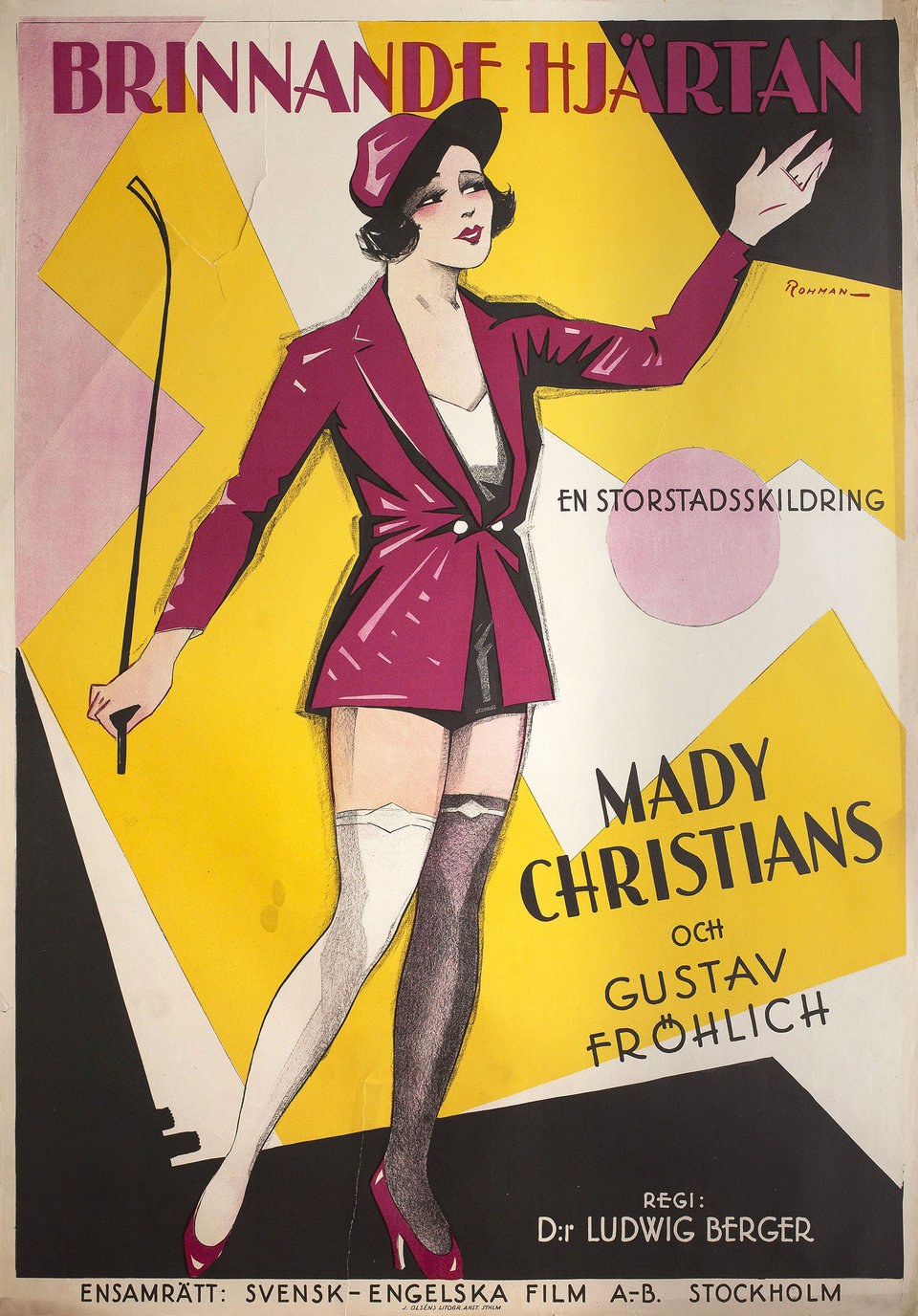
- Swedish poster for the film
- Directed by: Ludwig Berger
- Written by: Hans Müller
- Starring: Mady Christians; Gustav Fröhlich; Friedrich Kayßler; Frida Richard
- Cinematography: Curt Courant
- Music by: Giuseppe Becce; Willy Schmidt-Gentner
- Production company: Länderfilm
- Distributed by: Terra Film
- Release date: 16 February 1929
- Country: Germany
- Languages: Silent Version; German intertitles; Sound (Synchronized); English Intertitles

The Burning Heart or Heart Aflame (German: Das brennende Herz) is a 1929 German silent drama film directed by Ludwig Berger and starring Mady Christians, Gustav Fröhlich, and Friedrich Kayßler. The film was shot at the Staaken Studios in Berlin with sets were designed by the art director Rudolf Bamberger. A sound version was prepared by British International Pictures for English speaking audiences. While the sound version has no audible dialog, it features a synchronized musical score with sound effects and a theme song.

== Cast ==
- Mady Christians as Dorothee Claudius
- Gustav Fröhlich as Georg Wittig
- Friedrich Kayßler as Dorothees Vater
- Frida Richard as Pflegemutter Wittig
- Ida Wüst as Isolde Fuchs, Konzertagentin
- Anton Pointner as Direktor des Odeon
- Hanna Waag as Inge Keller
- Anton Edthofer as Baron
- Rosa Valetti
- Lena Malena as Zazu
- Alexandra Schmitt
- Hubert von Meyerinck
- Karl Platen
- Elsa Wagner as Schiessbudenbesitzerin

== Music ==
The sound version of the film featured a theme song entitled “Remember Me” by Bruce Sievier (words) and Norton Greenop (music).

== Bibliography ==
- Prawer, Siegbert Salomon (2005). Between Two Worlds: The Jewish Presence in German and Austrian Film, 1910–1933. New York: Berghahn Books. ISBN 978-1-84545-074-8.
