= Carl Jönsson =

German actor

- Born: 3 October 1870; Hamburg, North German Confederation
- Died: 5 May 1949 (aged 78); Wembley, London United Kingdom
- Occupation: Actor
- Years active: 1923-1939 (film)

Carl Jönsson (1870–1949) was a German stage actor. He also appeared in films during the 1920s and 1930s.

== Selected filmography ==
- Friedrich Schiller (1923)
- The Enchantress (1924)
- The Love Trap (1925)
- Three Days of Love (1931)
- The Girl from the Marsh Croft (1935)
- Trouble Backstairs (1935)
- The Young Count (1935)
- Lady Windermere's Fan (1935)
- My Son the Minister (1937)
- The Day After the Divorce (1938)
- Robert Koch (1939)
- Sensationsprozess Casilla (1939)

== Bibliography ==
- Hans-Michael Bock & Michael Töteberg. Das Ufa-Buch. Zweitausendeins, 1992.
