= Die Fledermaus (1931 film) =

French-German musical film

- Directed by: Karel Lamač
- Written by: Karl Forest; Richard Genée (libretto); Carl Haffner (libretto); Ludovic Halévy (opera); Henri Meilhac (opera); Hans H. Zerlett
- Produced by: August Mueller
- Starring: Anny Ondra; Georg Alexander; Oskar Sima
- Cinematography: Otto Heller
- Edited by: Lothar Wolff
- Music by: Johann Strauss (opera)
- Production companies: Vandor Film; Ondra-Lamac-Film
- Distributed by: Bavaria Film
- Release date: 25 December 1931
- Running time: 95 minutes
- Countries: France; Germany
- Language: German

Die Fledermaus is a 1931 French-German musical film directed by Karel Lamač and starring Anny Ondra, Georg Alexander, and Oskar Sima. It is an operetta film based on the 1874 stage work Die Fledermaus by Johann Strauss.

== Cast ==
- Anny Ondra as Adele
- Georg Alexander as Gabriel von Eisenstein
- Oskar Sima as Doktor Falke
- Hans Junkermann as Frank, Gefängnisdirektor
- Betty Werner as Rosalinde
- Iván Petrovich as Prinz Orlofsky
- Franz Felix as Alfred
- Karl Etlinger as Frosch, Gefängnisaufseher
- Eugen Jensen as Doktor Hell
- Jaro Fürth as Der Minister

== Bibliography ==
- Goble, Alan (1999). The Complete Index to Literary Sources in Film. Berlin: Walter de Gruyter. ISBN 978-3-11-095194-3.
