= A Waltz Dream (film) =

1925 film

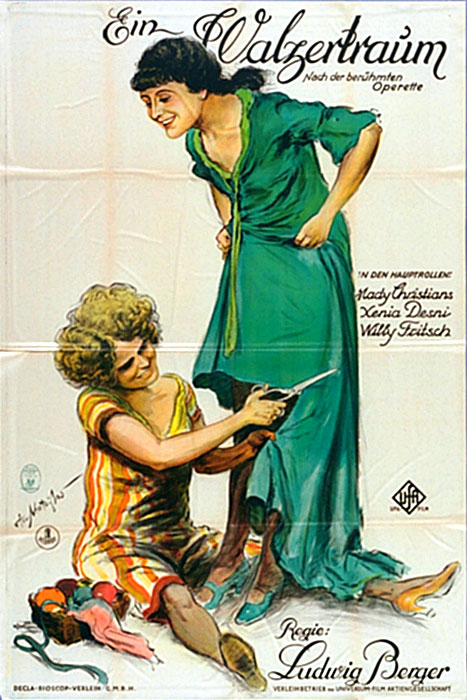
- German poster
- Directed by: Ludwig Berger
- Written by: Hans Müller-Einigen (novella); Leopold Jacobson (libretto); Felix Dörmann (libretto); Robert Liebmann; Norbert Falk
- Produced by: Erich Pommer
- Starring: Willy Fritsch; Mady Christians; Xenia Desni; Lydia Potechina
- Cinematography: Werner Brandes
- Music by: Oscar Straus (operetta); Erno Rapee
- Production company: UFA
- Distributed by: UFA
- Release date: 10 December 1925
- Running time: 105 minutes
- Country: Germany
- Languages: Silent; German intertitles

A Waltz Dream (German: Ein Walzertraum) is a 1925 German silent drama film directed by Ludwig Berger and starring Willy Fritsch, Mady Christians and Xenia Desni. It was based on the 1907 operetta Ein Walzertraum composed by Oscar Straus. It was influential on the development of later Viennese operetta films. Unlike many of UFA's ambitious productions of the 1920s, A Waltz Dream managed to recover its production cost in the domestic market alone.

The film's art direction was by Rudolf Bamberger.

== Cast ==
- Willy Fritsch as Nicholas Count Preyn
- Mady Christians as Princess Alix
- Xenia Desni as Franzi Steingruber
- Lydia Potechina as Steffi, Bassistin
- Mathilde Sussin as Frl. von Koeckeritz
- Karl Beckersachs as Archduke Peter Franz
- Julius Falkenstein as Rockhoff von Hoffrock
- Hans Brausewetter as Der Pikkolo
- Jakob Tiedtke as Eberhard XXIII von Flausenthurm
- Lucie Höflich

== Bibliography ==
- Hardt, Ursula. From Caligari to California: Erich Pommer's life in the International Film Wars. Berghahn Books, 1996.
- Kreimeier, Klaus. The Ufa Story: A History of Germany's Greatest Film Company, 1918-1945. University of California Press, 1999.
