= Between Evening and Morning =

1923 film directed by Arthur Robison

- Directed by: Arthur Robison
- Written by: Arthur Robison
- Starring: Werner Krauss; Agnes Straub; Elga Brink; Fritz Rasp
- Cinematography: Fritz Arno Wagner
- Music by: Willy Schmidt-Gentner
- Production company: DMB
- Release date: 3 August 1923
- Country: Germany
- Languages: Silent; German intertitles

Between Evening and Morning (German: Zwischen Abend und Morgen) is a 1923 German silent film directed by Arthur Robison and starring Werner Krauss, Agnes Straub, and Elga Brink.

== Cast ==
- Werner Krauss
- Agnes Straub
- Elga Brink
- Fritz Rasp
- Alfons Fryland
- Gertrude Welcker
- Helmut Göze
- Fred Selva-Goebel
- Blandine Ebinger

== Bibliography ==
- Bock, Hans-Michael; Bergfelder, Tim, eds. (2009). The Concise Cinegraph: Encyclopaedia of German Cinema. New York: Berghahn Books. ISBN 978-1-57181-655-9.
