= The False Dimitri =

1922 film

- Scene from a film
- German: Der falsche Dimitri
- Directed by: Hans Steinhoff
- Written by: Paul Beyer; Hans Steinhoff
- Produced by: Hanns Lippmann
- Starring: Alfred Abel; Agnes Straub; Eugen Klöpfer
- Cinematography: Helmar Lerski
- Production company: Gloria-Film
- Distributed by: UFA
- Release date: 22 December 1922
- Running time: 82 minutes
- Country: Germany
- Languages: Silent; German intertitles

The False Dimitri (German: Der falsche Dimitri) is a 1922 German silent historical film directed by Hans Steinhoff and starring Alfred Abel, Agnes Straub and Eugen Klöpfer. Set in early seventeenth century Russia it portrays the rise of False Dmitriy I during the Time of Troubles.

It was made by the German major studio UFA and filmed at the Staaken Studios in Berlin. The film's sets were designed by the art director Walter Reimann.

== Cast ==
- Alfred Abel as Zar Iwan der Grausame
- Agnes Straub as Zarin Marfa
- Eugen Klöpfer as Boris Godunow
- Friedrich Kühne as Bitjagowsky
- Ilka Grüning as Amme Pawlowa
- Paul Hartmann as Peter Grigory
- Hanni Weisse as Marina
- Gina Relly as Nastja
- Hans Heinrich von Twardowski
- Vasilij Vronski as Mistislawsky
- Eduard von Winterstein as Bielsky
- Heinrich Schroth as Jurjew
- Joseph Klein as Schuiskj
- John Gottowt as Narr
- Leopold von Ledebur as Woiwode Mnisek
- Harry Hardt as Fürst Leschinsky
- Fritz Achterberg as Odowalsky
- Hans Albers as Graf Jaro Lensky
- Lothar Müthel as Polnischer Abgesandter
- Georg Baselt as Wirt
- Tatjana Tarydina as Wirtin
- Wilhelm Diegelmann as Patriarch Hiob
- Jaro Fürth
- Oscar Sabo as Bauer
- Arthur Bergen as Schamanenzauberer
- Erhard Siedel as Schamanenzauberer
- Hugo Döblin as Schamanenzauberer
- Heinrich Gotho as Schamanenzauberer
- Georg H. Schnell as Bronsky
- Franz Egenieff
