= The Enchantress (film) =

1924 film

- Directed by: William Karfiol
- Written by: Max Jungk; Julius Urgiß
- Based on: Die Bacchantin (novel) by Ludwig Ganghofer
- Produced by: William Karfiol
- Starring: Olga Chekhova; Charlotte Ander; Hans Mierendorff
- Cinematography: Heinrich Gärtner
- Production company: Karfiol-Film
- Release date: 29 December 1924
- Country: Germany
- Languages: Silent; German intertitles

The Enchantress (German: Die Bacchantin) is a 1924 German silent drama film directed by William Karfiol and starring Olga Chekhova, Charlotte Ander, and Hans Mierendorff.

The film's sets were designed by the art director Franz Seemann.

== Cast ==
- Olga Chekhova
- Charlotte Ander
- Hans Mierendorff
- Bruno Kastner
- Martha Hartmann
- Hans Heinrich von Twardowski
- Rudolf Lettinger
- Loo Hardy
- Sylvia Torf
- Paul Westermeier
- Rudolf Klein-Rhoden
- Alfred Braun
- Carl Jönsson

== Bibliography ==
- Grange, William (2008). Cultural Chronicle of the Weimar Republic. Lanham, MD: Scarecrow Press. ISBN 978-0-8108-5967-8.
