= The Mayor of Zalamea (1920 film) =

1920 German silent film

- Directed by: Ludwig Berger
- Written by: Pedro Calderón de la Barca (play); Ludwig Berger
- Produced by: Erich Pommer
- Starring: Lil Dagover; Albert Steinrück; Agnes Straub; Max Schreck
- Cinematography: A.O. Weitzenberg
- Production company: Decla-Bioscop
- Distributed by: Decla-Bioscop
- Release date: 28 October 1920
- Running time: 87 minutes
- Country: Germany
- Languages: Silent; German intertitles

The Mayor of Zalamea (German: Der Richter von Zalamea) is a 1920 German silent drama film directed by Ludwig Berger and starring Lil Dagover, Albert Steinrück and Agnes Straub. The film was based on Pedro Calderón de la Barca's historic Spanish play of the same name. It was shot at the Babelsberg Studios in Berlin with sets designed by the art director Hermann Warm. It was Berger's debut as a director and screenwriter.

== Cast ==
- Lil Dagover as Isabel
- Albert Steinrück as Pedro Crespo
- Agnes Straub as Chispa
- Elisabeth Horn as Ines
- Lothar Müthel as Juan
- Heinrich Witte as Don Alvaro
- Max Schreck as Don Mendo
- Ernst Legal as Sergeant
- Ernst Rotmund as Rebolledo
- Hermann Vallentin
- Armin Schweizer
- Helmuth Krüger

== Reception ==
Paimann's Filmlisten called the film a romantic drama and a monumental film and described it as follows: "Interesting subject matter. Excellent acting and scenery, very good photography."

== Bibliography ==
- Hardt, Ursula. From Caligari to California: Erich Pommer's Life in the International Film Wars. Berghahn Books, 1996.
