= Rudolf Bamberger =

German art and film director

- Born: 21 May 1888; Mainz, Rhineland-Palatinate, German Empire
- Died: January 1945 (aged 56); Auschwitz, German-occupied Poland
- Occupation: Art director
- Years active: 1921-1933 (film)

Rudolf Bamberger (21 May 1888 – January 1945) was a German art director. He worked as a set designer in German theatre and cinema during the Weimar era. Following the introduction of sound film, he produced several documentaries. He was the elder brother of the director Ludwig Berger, and was married to the actress Hanna Waag.

The Jewish Bamberger left Germany following the Nazi takeover, and settled in Luxembourg. He was later arrested by Nazi authorities during the German wartime occupation and was sent to Auschwitz, where he was murdered.

== Selected filmography ==
- The Story of Christine von Herre (1921)
- A Glass of Water (1923)
- The Lost Shoe (1923)
- A Waltz Dream (1925)
- The Master of Nuremberg (1927)
- The Burning Heart (1929)

== Bibliography ==
- Prawer, S.S. Between Two Worlds: The Jewish Presence in German and Austrian Film, 1910-1933. Berghahn Books, 2005.
