= The Woman in Heaven =

1920 film

- Directed by: Johannes Guter
- Written by: Johannes Guter; Walter Lierke
- Produced by: Erich Pommer
- Starring: Lil Dagover; Werner Krauss
- Cinematography: Wilhelm Schwäbl
- Production company: Decla-Bioscop
- Distributed by: Decla-Bioscop
- Release date: 23 August 1920
- Country: Germany
- Languages: Silent; German intertitles

The Woman in Heaven (German:Die Frau im Himmel) is a 1920 German silent film directed by Johannes Guter and starring Lil Dagover and Werner Krauss.

The film's art direction was by Franz Seemann.

== Cast ==
In alphabetical order

- Alfred Abel
- Julius Brandt
- Hans Brockmann
- Helga Burger
- Lil Dagover as Tatjana
- Werner Krauss as Aufseher
- Lothar Müthel as Feodor
- Auguste Prasch-Grevenberg
- Robert Scholz
- Hermine Straßmann-Witt

== Bibliography ==
- Hans-Michael Bock and Tim Bergfelder. The Concise Cinegraph: An Encyclopedia of German Cinema. Berghahn Books.
