= Agnes Straub =

German actress (1890–1941)

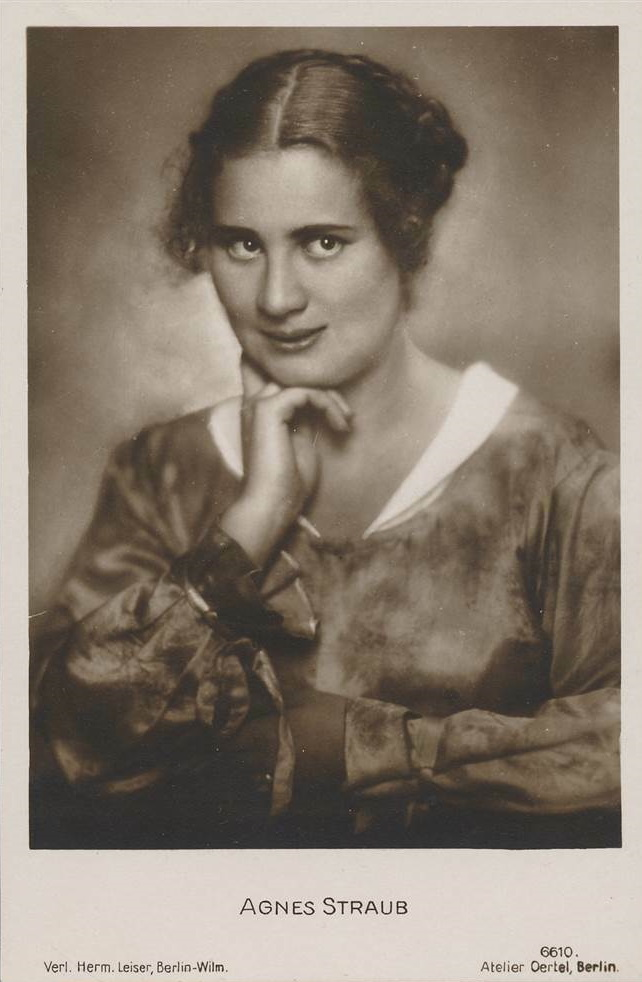
- Born: 2 April 1890; Munich, German Empire
- Died: 8 July 1941 (aged 51); Charlottenburg-Berlin, Nazi Germany
- Occupation: Actress
- Years active: 1903–1938
- Spouse: Lionel Royce (m. 1925)

Signature
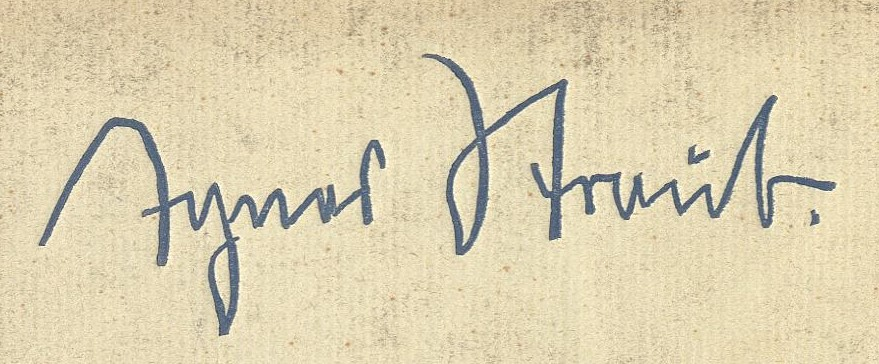

Agnes Josephine Straub (2 April 1890 – 8 July 1941) was a German film actress.

== Biography ==
Agnes Josephine Straub was born on 2 April 1890 in Munich. She made her stage debut in Dachau, Bavaria at the age of 13. She began attending acting lessons and, in 1908, acted as Sappho in Grillparzer's play.

After acting in Bonn, Königsberg, and Vienna, Straub traveled to Berlin and acted alongside actresses such as Elisabeth Bergner and Grete Mosheim.

From 1925 onwards Straub mainly worked with her husband, the actor and director Lionel Royce. In 1930, Royce created his own theater company called the Agnes-Straub-Ensemble.

In 1934, Royce was banned from working due to being a Jew, and left for Vienna, where he changed his name and achieved great success and very favorable reviews in the nationalist press. When his identity was revealed, a scandal broke out and Royce had to leave Austria and emigrate to America.

Meanwhile, Straub remained in Germany and, in 1938, was involved in a serious car accident that ended her career. She died in 1941 and was buried at the St. Georgen Cemetery in Bruck an der Großglocknerstraße.

== Selected filmography ==
- The Mayor of Zalamea (1920)
- The Skull of Pharaoh's Daughter (1920)
- The Story of Christine von Herre (1921)
- On the Red Cliff (1922)
- The Earl of Essex (1922)
- The False Dimitri (1922)
- Fridericus Rex (1922)
- Between Evening and Morning (1923)
- William Tell (1923)
- The Path to God (1924)
- The House of Lies (1926)
- Students' Love (1927)
- The Four Musketeers (1934)
- Fridericus (1937)
- The Citadel of Warsaw (1937)
- So You Don't Know Korff Yet? (1938)
