= Lady Windermere's Fan (1935 film) =

1935 film

- Directed by: Heinz Hilpert
- Written by: Herbert B. Fredersdorf; Heinz Hilpert; Bernd Hofmann; Karl Lerbs
- Based on: Lady Windermere's Fan by Oscar Wilde
- Produced by: Georg Witt
- Starring: Lil Dagover; Walter Rilla; Fritz Odemar
- Cinematography: Oskar Schnirch
- Edited by: Axel von Werner
- Music by: Walter Gronostay
- Production companies: Georg Witt-Film; UFA
- Distributed by: Rota-Film; Sascha-Film (Austria)
- Release date: 25 October 1935
- Running time: 95 minutes
- Country: Germany
- Language: German

Lady Windermere's Fan (German: Lady Windermeres Fächer) is a 1935 German comedy film directed by Heinz Hilpert and starring Lil Dagover, Walter Rilla and Aribert Wäscher. It is based on the play Lady Windermere's Fan by Oscar Wilde. The film's sets were designed by the art directors Heinrich Beisenherz and Ludwig Reiber.

== Cast ==
- Lil Dagover as Mrs. Erlynne
- Walter Rilla as Lord Windermere
- Hanna Waag as Lady Windermere
- Fritz Odemar as Lord Augustus
- Karl Günther as Lord Darlington
- Karl Ludwig Schreiber as Lord Arthur
- Ernst Karchow as Cecil Graham
- Heinz Salfner as Duke of Barwick
- Ilse Fürstenberg as Duchess of Barwick
- Olga Limburg as Lady Hutfield
- Paul Dahlke as Bankier Brown
- Aribert Wäscher as Direktor
- Paul Bildt as Dramaturg Gray
- Grethe Weiser as Diseuse
- Eduard Bornträger as Inspizient
- Carl Jönsson as Butler

== Bibliography ==
- Bock, Hans-Michael; Bergfelder, Tim, eds. (2009). The Concise Cinegraph: Encyclopaedia of German Cinema. New York: Berghahn Books. ISBN 978-1-57181-655-9.
