= The Railway King (film) =

1921 film

- Directed by: Eugen Illés
- Written by: Eugen Illés; Artúr Somlay
- Produced by: Eugen Illés
- Starring: Fritz Kortner; Hermann Vallentin; Artúr Somlay
- Cinematography: Friedrich Paulmann; Günther Rittau
- Production company: Illés-Film
- Distributed by: National Film
- Release date: 29 December 1921
- Country: Germany
- Languages: Silent; German intertitles

The Railway King (German: Der Eisenbahnkönig) is a 1921 German silent drama film directed by Eugen Illés and starring Fritz Kortner, Hermann Vallentin and Artúr Somlay. It was released in two parts, premiering at the Marmorhaus.

The film's sets were designed by the art director Fritz Kraenke and August Rinaldi.

== Cast ==
- Fritz Kortner
- Hermann Vallentin
- Artúr Somlay
- Heinrich Peer
- Carl Schönfeld
- Jaro Fürth
- Danny Guertler
- Ruth Larrisson
- Emil Rameau
- Preben J. Rist
- Genia Vallot
- Anna von Palen

== Bibliography ==
- Grange, William. Cultural Chronicle of the Weimar Republic. Scarecrow Press, 2008.
