= Phantom (1922 film) =

1922 German film by F. W. Murnau

- German theatrical release poster
- Directed by: F. W. Murnau
- Written by: Thea von Harbou
- Based on: the novel by Gerhart Hauptmann
- Produced by: Erich Pommer; Uco-Film GMBH
- Starring: Alfred Abel; Grete Berger; Lil Dagover; Lya De Putti; Anton Edthofer
- Cinematography: Axel Graatkjaer; Theophan Ouchakoff
- Music by: Leo Spies
- Production company: Decla-Bioscop
- Distributed by: UFA
- Release date: 13 November 1922 (Germany)
- Running time: 117–125 minutes
- Country: Germany
- Languages: Silent film; German intertitles

Phantom is a 1922 German drama film directed by F. W. Murnau, adapted by Thea von Harbou from a novel by Gerhart Hauptmann. It was premiered as part of tributes to Hauptmann on his 60th birthday.

It is an example of German Expressionist film and some parts have a surreal, dreamlike quality. The film is not as well-known as Murnau's other work, and had been considered a lost film due to the lack of a complete, accessible version until it was reconstructed in 2003.

== Plot ==
Phantom (1922)

In a prologue, Gerhart Hauptmann is shown walking in the countryside, holding a book.

The film continues in an extended flashback. Lorenz Lubota is a clerk in a minor town hall office, an aspiring poet, and a member of a family headed by a worried mother who has a tense relationship with her daughter, Melanie, whom the mother believes to be working as a prostitute.

One day, while Lorenz is walking to work, a woman driving a carriage with two white horses hits him in the road, knocking him to the ground. Physically, he is unharmed, but from that point forward, the woman in the carriage consumes his every thought.

His obsession with the woman, whom he discovers is named Veronika, costs him his job when he fails to show up for work and threatens his boss for accusing him of stalking her. Believing his poems will be published and anticipating a meeting with a publisher, Lorenz asks his Aunt Schwabe, a cutthroat pawnbroker, for money to buy a new suit. Aunt Schwabe's assistant, Wigottschinski, encourages Lorenz to celebrate and they accidentally meet Lorenz's sister Melanie, who has left home, in a night club. She becomes Wigottschinski's girlfriend.

Unable to contact Veronika, who is wealthy and engaged to someone of her own class, Lorenz instead begins courting Mellitta, a gold digger who looks like Veronika, lavishing her with expensive gifts, all the while reliving the day he was run over in his mind again and again. His need for money increases. Meanwhile, Lorenz's mother's health begins to deteriorate due to her worries over her son's and her daughter's actions; and Lorenz's friend Marie and her father learn that Lorenz's poems will not be published after all.

Wigottschinski persuades Lorenz to swindle more money out of Aunt Schwabe, and gives Lorenz a sizable amount. However, Aunt Schwabe becomes suspicious and discovers that Lorenz will not be a published poet, and she angrily demands that he pay back the money in three days or else she will notify the police. Desperate, Lorenz agrees to Wigottschinski's plan to break into her house after she has gone to sleep and to steal enough money to pay back the loan. She wakes up and discovers them, running to the window to call for the police. A struggle ensues, and Wigottschinski kills her, while Melanie runs off and eventually briefly reunites with her mother before disappearing.

Lorenz is arrested and sent to prison. After his release, the film returns to the present, where Lorenz is finishing writing his life story, in an attempt to purge from his mind the phantom woman who repeatedly drives away from him in her carriage. Lorenz now has a new life, married to Marie.

== Cast ==
- Alfred Abel as Lorenz Lubota
- Frida Richard as Lubota's mother
- Aud Egede-Nissen as Melanie, Lubota's sister
- Hans Heinrich von Twardowski as Hugo, Lubota's younger brother
- Adolf Klein as Harlan, the hardware dealer
- Olga Engl as Harlan's wife
- Lya de Putti as Veronika, Harlan's daughter
- Ilka Grüning as the Baroness
- Lya de Putti as Mellitta, the Baroness's daughter
- Grete Berger as Frau Schwabe , the pawnbroker, Lubota's aunt
- Anton Edthofer as Wigottschinski
- Karl Etlinger as Starke, the bookbinder
- Lil Dagover as Marie, Starke's daughter
- Heinrich Witte as a civil servant

== Production ==
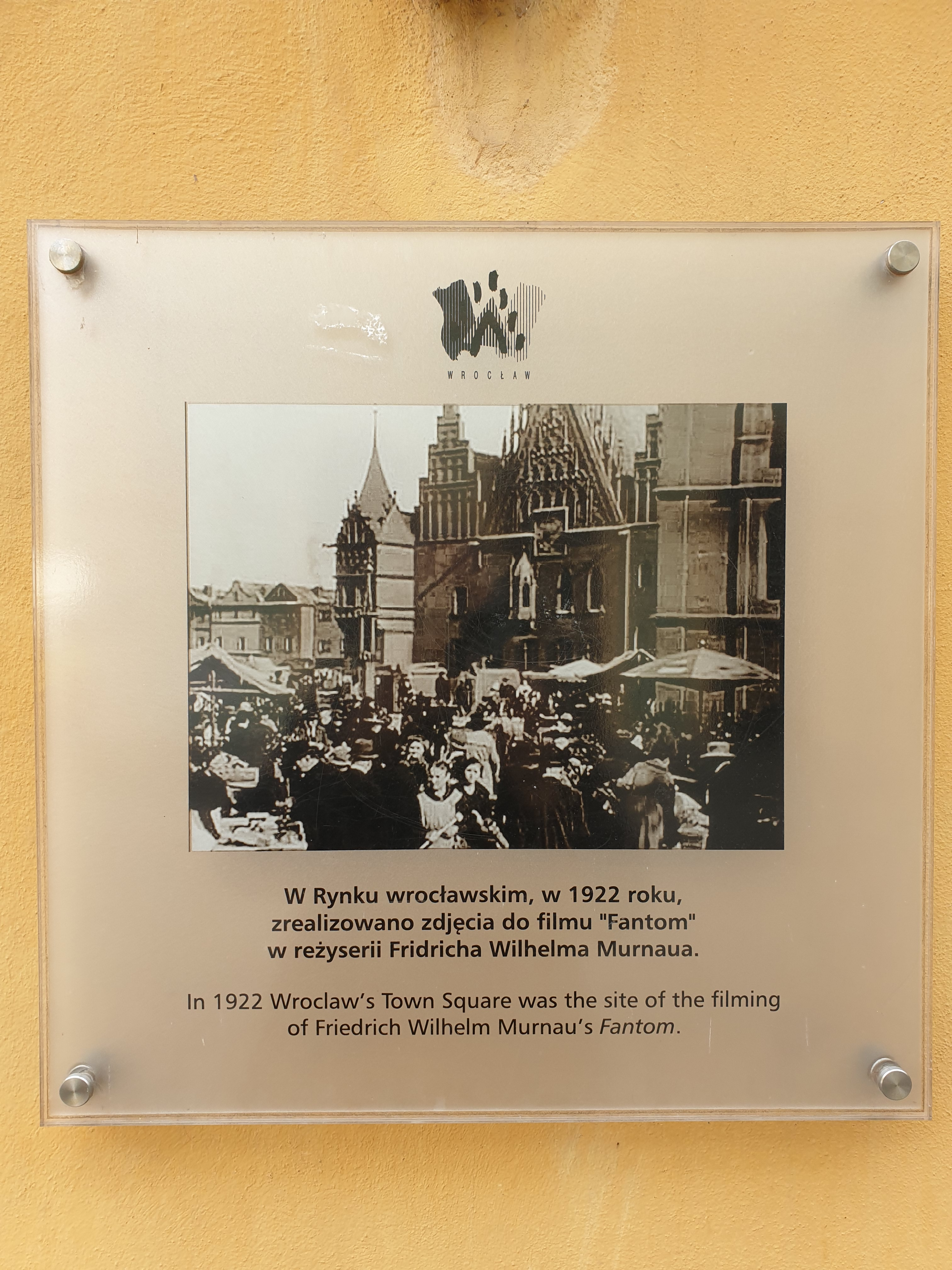
Commemorative plaque for the filming of the film Phantom by Friedrich Wilhelm Murnau in the market square in Wrocław

The film was based on the novel Phantom, written by dramatist and novelist Gerhart Hauptmann. The novel was serialised in nine parts in the Berliner Illustrirten Zeitung, with the final version of the novel being written immediately after the draft for the film, and was based on the sequence of scenes in the film treatment.

Main filming took place at the Decla-Bioscop film studios and outdoor set in Neubabelsberg in Potsdam, with additional external scenes shot in the market square in Wrocław (German: Breslau), Lower Silesia, the setting for the story. The film's sets were designed by Hermann Warm and Erich Czerwonski.

The premiere of Phantom took place on 13 November 1922 at the Ufa-Palast am Zoo cinema in Berlin, on the occasion of Hauptmann's 60th birthday. The film was heavily linked to his original novel. Hauptmann has a cameo appearance in the film at the start.

== Preservation status ==
No complete, accessible version of the film existed for many years, and it was thought to be one of those from F.W. Murnau's career that were lost, but the film was restored in 2002–03 in a collaborative project by the Bundesarchiv-Filmarchiv and the Friedrich-Wilhelm-Murnau-Stiftung. The film was reconstructed from the original negative and fragments of a dupe-negative, both from the Bundesarchiv-Filmarchiv, Berlin. In the original negative, most of the intertitles had been preserved as flash-titles, and were lengthened for the reconstruction. Missing intertitles were restored on the basis of the screenplay. The tinting was reconstructed with the help of distinguishing reference numbers.

The film's preservation status mostly approaches its original quality, apart from a few small issues during night time scenes and damage on the side of the film. Some additions were included in the restoration, including tinting of the film. The intertitles were re-translated, but the original German titles are no longer available to access. The additions of tinting and the re-translated intertitles were not originally part of the film before it was preserved.

== Reception ==
At Phantom's original release, it was heavily associated with the author of the original book, Gerhart Hauptmann. This association helped boost the film's reputation at the time, and many contemporary film journals "concentrated on honoring, thanking, and praising Hauptmann while advertising the Phantom adaptation".

For contemporary critic Béla Balázs, the film is "an ingenious attempt ... to show the world in the colour of a temperament, in the illumination of a feeling: objectified lyricism".

Fred Gehler argues that "Lorenz Lubota's story is not only the experience of a passionate love affair and its consequences, but also reflects the situation of the German lower middle class immediately after the war and the November Revolution—their distorted relationship with reality, their wavering, their bewilderment."

Film critic Dave Kehr reviewed Phantom shortly after the film was restored, and claims that Murnau's work on the film is unique due to his "deep sense of character", as well as his "attention to the details and manifestations of human psychology". Kehr also claims that the work of restoring the film "should go quite a way toward restoring its reputation".

In a review by author and associate professor Paul Dobryden, he supports the preservation and circulation of the film, saying that the film "deserves to be seen and remembered". However, he also states that he was disappointed in how the original German titles from the original version were omitted in the restoration of the film.

Author and film critic Leonard Maltin awarded the film three out of a possible four stars, calling the film "[a] poetic psychodrama".

== See also ==
- 1922 in film
- German Expressionism
