= Victor Trivas =

Russian-Jewish screenwriter and film director

Victor Trivas (July 9, 1896 – April 12, 1970) was a Russian-Jewish screenwriter and film director. He was nominated at the 1946 Academy Awards for Best Story for the film The Stranger.

== Selected filmography ==
=== Screenwriter ===
- The Brothers Karamazov (1931)
- The Song of Life (1931)
- Mirages de Paris (1933)
- The Mayor's Dilemma (1939)
- Song of Russia (1944)
- The Stranger (1946) (story and adaptation only)
- Boom in the Moon (1946)
- Where the Sidewalk Ends (1950)
- The Secret of Convict Lake (1951)

=== Director ===
- Call of the Blood (1929)
- Hell on Earth (1931)
- On the Streets (1933)
- Tovaritch (1935)
- The Head (1959)

=== Art director ===
- The Woman from Berlin (1925)
- Eve's Daughters (1928)
- The Murderer Dimitri Karamazov (1931)

== Bibliography ==
- Langman, Larry. Destination Hollywood: The Influence of Europeans on American Filmmaking. McFarland & Co, 2000.
- Phillips, Alastair. City of Darkness, City of Light: émigré Filmmakers in Paris, 1929-1939. Amsterdam University Press, 2004

== See also ==
- List of Russian Academy Award winners and nominees
