= Farewell Waltz (film) =

1934 film directed by Géza von Bolváry

- Directed by: Géza von Bolváry
- Written by: Jacques Théry (novel); Ernst Marischka
- Produced by: Siegfried Fritz Fromm
- Starring: Wolfgang Liebeneiner; Richard Romanowsky; Hanna Waag
- Cinematography: Werner Brandes
- Edited by: Hermann Haller
- Music by: Alois Melichar
- Production company: Boston Film
- Release date: 3 October 1934
- Running time: 87 minutes
- Country: Germany
- Language: German

Farewell Waltz (German: Abschiedswalzer) is a 1934 German historical musical drama film directed by Géza von Bolváry and starring Wolfgang Liebeneiner, Richard Romanowsky and Hanna Waag. It is based on the life of the composer Frédéric Chopin.

The film's sets were designed by the art director Emil Hasler and Arthur Schwarz. A separate French-language version Song of Farewell was also produced.

== Synopsis ==
Warsaw, 1830. Chopin is a student involved in secret nationalist revolution and in love with the singer Constantia. His friends however believe he can best serve the cause by growing abroad and winning fame as a composer. The November uprising against the Russian Empire is crushed. Meanwhile, Chopin, with the assistance of Franz Liszt, turns his initial failure in Paris into a triumph.

== Cast ==
- Wolfgang Liebeneiner as Frédéric Chopin
- Richard Romanowsky as Professor Elsner
- Hanna Waag as Constantia Gladkowska
- Julia Serda as Madame Gladkowska, her mother
- Sybille Schmitz as George Sand
- Hans Schlenck as Franz Liszt
- Gustav Waldau as Friedrich Kalkbrenner
- Paul Henckels as Ignaz Pleyel
- Albert Hörrmann as Alfred De Musset
- Erna Morena as Herzogin von Orleans
- Margarete Schön as Madame Mercier
- Herbert Dirmoser as Titus
- Fritz Odemar as Grabowsky, trader
- Kurt Middendorf as Victor Hugo
- Walter Gross as Waiter

== Bibliography ==
- Raykoff, Ivan . Dreams of Love: Playing the Romantic Pianist. OUP USA, 2014.
