= Hanna Waag =

German actress (1904–1995)

- Born: 24 May 1904; Giessen, Hesse, German Empire
- Died: 13 August 1995 (aged 91); Giessen, Hesse, Germany
- Occupation: Actress
- Years active: 1929–1937 (film)

Hanna Waag (1904–1995) was a German film actress. Amongst her performances were playing Queen Victoria in the 1933 film Waltz War and the title role in Lady Windermere's Fan in 1935. Of Jewish heritage, in 1937 she went into exile from the Nazi regime in Germany. Her husband, the Jewish art director Rudolf Bamberger was killed at Auschwitz.

== Selected filmography ==
- The Burning Heart (1929)
- Marriage (1929)
- The Merry Widower (1929)
- Love's Carnival (1930)
- The King of Paris (1930)
- The Murderer Dimitri Karamazov (1931)
- The Brothers Karamazov (1931)
- Waltz War (1933)
- Farewell Waltz (1934)
- Music in the Blood (1934)
- The Gentleman Without a Residence (1934)
- Lady Windermere's Fan (1935)
- The Accusing Song (1936)

== Bibliography ==
- Prawer, S.S. Between Two Worlds: The Jewish Presence in German and Austrian Film, 1910-1933. Berghahn Books, 2005.
