= The Story of Christine von Herre =

1921 film

- Directed by: Ludwig Berger
- Written by: Heinrich Zschokke (novella); Ludwig Berger
- Produced by: Erich Pommer
- Starring: Agnes Straub; Werner Krauss; Paul Hartmann; Heinrich George
- Cinematography: Karl Freund
- Production company: Decla-Bioscop
- Distributed by: Decla-Bioscop
- Release date: 30 September 1921
- Running time: 60 minutes
- Country: Germany
- Languages: Silent; German intertitles

The Story of Christine von Herre (German: Der Roman der Christine von Herre) is a 1921 German silent drama film directed by Ludwig Berger and starring Agnes Straub, Werner Krauss, and Paul Hartmann. It was based on a novella by Heinrich Zschokke. It was shot at the Babelsberg Studios of Decla-Bioscop in Berlin and on location at Glatz in Silesia. The film's sets were designed by the art directors Rudolf Bamberger and Franz Seemann. The film premiered on 30 September 1921 at the UT-Kurfürstendamm and the UT-Nollendorfplatz in Berlin. It was popular at the box office and with critics.

== Cast ==
- Agnes Straub as Gräfin Christine
- Werner Krauss as Der alte graf von herre
- Paul Hartmann as Conte Marino Marco
- Heinrich George as Graf Dieter von Herre
- Julius Falkenstein as Hausarzt Dr. Wendlin
- Max Schreck as Hausdiener Peter
- Marie Ferron as Christines Cousine Luise
- Ilka Grüning as Die alte Comtesse
- Sybill Morel as Gärtnerstochter
- Ernst Legal as Schloßgärtner / Dr.Ramiro
- Max Adalbert
- Adele Sandrock
- Helmuth Krüger
- Karl Platen

== Bibliography ==
- Hardt, Ursula (1996). From Caligari to California: Erich Pommer's Life in the International Film Wars. Providence: Berghahn Books. ISBN 978-1-57181-930-7.
