= On the Red Cliff =

1922 film

- Directed by: Hanna Henning
- Written by: Anny Wothe (novel); Hanna Henning
- Starring: Fritz Kortner; Agnes Straub; Hans Adalbert Schlettow
- Cinematography: Günther Krampf
- Production company: Mitteleuropäische Film
- Release date: 29 April 1922
- Country: Germany
- Languages: Silent; German intertitles

On the Red Cliff (German: Am roten Kliff) is a 1922 German silent drama film directed by Hanna Henning and starring Fritz Kortner, Agnes Straub, and Hans Adalbert Schlettow. It premiered at the Marmorhaus in Berlin.

The film's sets were designed by the art director Julian Ballenstedt.

== Cast ==
In alphabetical order

- Rudolf Bachmann as Pastor Nielsen
- Hannes Henning as Peer
- Rudolf Hofbauer as Kapitän Tamen
- Fritz Kortner as Henning Rinkens
- Ludwig Körner as Ludwig
- Sybill Morel as Rote ose
- Nikoline Petersen as Karlinken
- Hans Adalbert Schlettow as Geert Rantsau
- Charlotte Spira as Swea Lansing
- Agnes Straub as Antje
- Ellinor Wilhelms as Godewar
- Ernst Winar as Tammo Kohrsen

== Bibliography ==
- Grange, William (2008). Cultural Chronicle of the Weimar Republic. Lanham, MD: Scarecrow Press. ISBN 978-0-8108-5967-8.
