= Hans Wassmann =

German actor

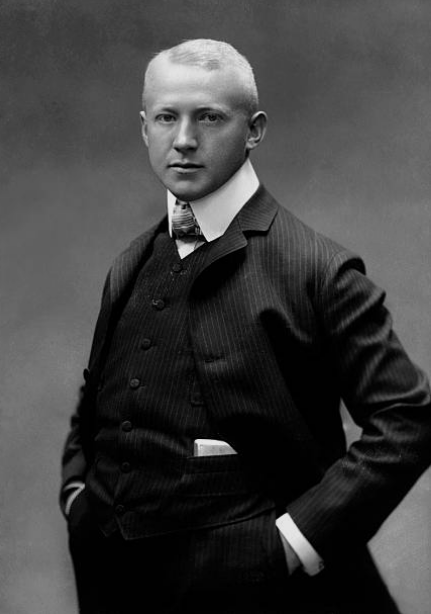
- Born: 1 January 1875; Berlin, German Empire
- Died: 5 April 1932 (aged 57); Berlin, Germany
- Occupation: Actor
- Years active: 1914-1935 (film)

Hans Wassmann (1 January 1873 – 5 April 1932) was a German film actor.

== Selected filmography ==
- Laugh Bajazzo (1915)
- Miss Venus (1921)
- Louise de Lavallière (1922)
- A Glass of Water (1923)
- Nanon (1924)
- Garragan (1924)
- The Great Unknown (1924)
- The Love Trap (1925)
- Hussar Fever (1925)
- Chaste Susanne (1926)
- Queen Louise (1927)
- Dancing Vienna (1927)
- Light-Hearted Isabel (1927)
- A Modern Dubarry (1927)
- The Master of Nuremberg (1927)
- Luther (1928)
- A Thousand Words of German (1930)
- My Wife, the Impostor (1931)
- Ronny (1931)
- The Captain from Köpenick (1931)
- The Battle of Bademunde (1931)
- Shooting Festival in Schilda (1931)
- Queen of the Night (1931)
- The Mad Bomberg (1932)
- The Office Manager (1932)
- Scandal on Park Street (1932)
- Things Are Getting Better Already (1932)

== Bibliography ==
- Chandler, Charlotte. Marlene: Marlene Dietrich, A Personal Biography. Simon and Schuster, 2011.
