= The Murderer Dimitri Karamazov =

1931 film

- Directed by: Erich Engels; Fedor Ozep
- Screenplay by: Erich Engels; Leonhard Frank; Fedor Ozep; Victor Trivas
- Based on: The Brothers Karamazov by Fyodor Dostoevsky
- Produced by: Eugene Frenke
- Starring: Fritz Kortner; Anna Sten; Fritz Rasp
- Cinematography: Friedl Behn-Grund
- Edited by: Fedor Ozep; Hans von Passavant
- Music by: Karol Rathaus; Kurt Schröder
- Production company: Terra Film
- Distributed by: Terra Film
- Release date: 6 February 1931
- Running time: 91 minutes
- Country: Germany
- Language: German
- Budget: $100,000
- Box office: $2 million

The Murderer Dimitri Karamazov (German: Der Mörder Dimitri Karamasoff) is a 1931 German drama film directed by Erich Engels and Fedor Ozep, starring Fritz Kortner and Anna Sten. It tells the story of a lieutenant who is suspected of having murdered his father. The film is based on motifs from Fyodor Dostoyevsky's novel The Brothers Karamazov. A French version The Brothers Karamazov was produced separately.

== Cast ==
- Fritz Kortner as Dimitri Karamasoff
- Anna Sten as Gruschenka
- Fritz Rasp as Smerdjakoff
- Bernhard Minetti as Iwan Karamasoff
- Max Pohl as Fedor Karamasoff
- Hanna Waag as Katja
- Fritz Alberti as Gerichtspräsident
- Werner Hollmann as Der Pole
- Elisabeth Neumann-Viertel as Fenja

== Production ==
The film was produced by Terra Film and shot at the company's Marienfelde Studios in Berlin. Filming took place from 22 October to 24 November 1930. The film's sets were designed by the art directors Heinrich Richter and Victor Trivas.

== Reception ==
The British film critic Raymond Durgnat wrote in a 1993 article about Ozep for Film Dope: "The Karamazov film is a tour de force of stylistic eclecticism: expressionist acting (Kortner), dynamic angles, Russian editing, marathon tracking shots. It's a real showpiece of formalism geared to psycho-lyrical ends, exactly as Eisenstein intended, except that Dostoievskian soul-torments replace Leninist collectivism to which the 'official' montage-masters tuned their lyres."
