= Bubi Is Jealous =

1916 film

- Directed by: Hanna Henning
- Written by: Hanna Henning
- Produced by: Hanna Henning
- Starring: Reinhold Schünzel; Olga Engl
- Production company: Bubi-Film Henning
- Release date: August 1916
- Country: Germany
- Languages: Silent; German intertitles

Bubi Is Jealous (German: Bubi ist eifersüchtig) is a 1916 German silent film directed by Hanna Henning and starring Reinhold Schünzel and Olga Engl.

== Cast ==
- Reinhold Schünzel as Hellmut Hartleben
- Olga Engl as Frau von Hartleben
- Joseph Römer as Bubi
- Ally Kay as Ally Heldringen
- Susanne Lafrenz as Lotte

== Bibliography ==
- Bock, Hans-Michael & Bergfelder, Tim. The Concise CineGraph. Encyclopedia of German Cinema. Berghahn Books, 2009.
