= Satan (1920 film) =

1920 film

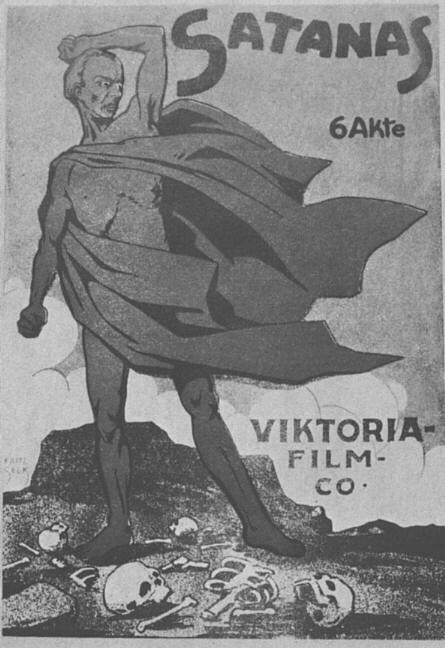
- Film poster
- Directed by: F. W. Murnau
- Written by: Robert Wiene
- Produced by: Robert Wiene
- Starring: Fritz Kortner; Conrad Veidt; Sadjah Gezza; Martin Wolfgang
- Cinematography: Karl Freund
- Distributed by: Viktoria-Film
- Release date: January 1920
- Running time: 54 minutes
- Country: Germany
- Languages: Silent; German intertitles

Satan (German: Satanas) is a 1920 silent German drama film in three parts, directed by F. W. Murnau, written and produced by Robert Wiene. It was one of Murnau's first directorial attempts, and along with his 1920 Der Januskopf, is today considered a lost film. The film starred Fritz Kortner, Sadjah Gezza and Conrad Veidt. Karl Freund was the cinematographer.

Only a brief fragment of the film is kept in the Cinémathèque Française film archive. Although most of the film no longer exists, it does not seem to be a true horror film, in that allegedly only the third segment of the film deals with the Devil. Robert Wiene probably had more control over the film than Murnau did, since he wrote the screenplay. Murnau hired Conrad Veidt to work with him in his next film, the 1920 Der Januskopf (which also featured Bela Lugosi).

== Plot ==
The film is divided up into three separate short stories. The first segment involves a love triangle between an ancient Pharaoh named Amenhotep, Nouri (the girl he loves) and his young rival Jorab whom she loves. The second segment is an adaptation of Victor Hugo's Lucrezia Borgia. The third story deals with an idealistic young revolutionary named Hans Conrad, who is goaded into violence by a strange man named Grodski (Veidt), who seems to be Satan in human form. Only the third story appears to have had any supernatural overtones.

== Cast ==
- Fritz Kortner as Pharao Amenhotep
- Sadjah Gezza as Nouri - die Fremde
- Ernst Hofmann as Jorab - der Hirt
- Margit Barnay as Phahi - die Frau des Pharao
- Else Berna as Lucrezia Borgia
- Kurt Ehrle as Gennaro
- Jaro Fürth as Rustinghella
- Ernst Stahl-Nachbaur as Prince Alfonso d'Este
- Martin Wolfgang as Hans Conrad
- Marija Leiko as Irene
- Elsa Wagner as Mother Conrad
- Max Kronert as Father Conrad
- Conrad Veidt as Lucifer / Hermit / Gubetta / Grodski

== See also ==
- List of lost films
