= Under the Spell of Silence =

- Directed by: Hanna Henning
- Written by: Hanna Henning
- Produced by: Hanna Henning
- Starring: Olga Engl; Reinhold Schünzel
- Production company: Bubi-Film Henning
- Release date: July 1916
- Country: Germany
- Languages: Silent; German intertitles

Under the Spell of Silence (German: Im Banne des Schweigens) is a 1916 German silent film directed by Hanna Henning and starring Olga Engl and Reinhold Schünzel.

== Cast ==
- Olga Engl
- Reinhold Schünzel
- May Henkel
- Fritz Junkermann
- Olaf Roemer as Bubi
- Joseph Römer as Bubi

== Bibliography ==
- Bock, Hans-Michael & Bergfelder, Tim. The Concise CineGraph. Encyclopedia of German Cinema. Berghahn Books, 2009.
