= The Lost Shoe =

1923 film

- Directed by: Ludwig Berger
- Written by: Clemens Brentano; E.T.A. Hoffmann; Ludwig Berger
- Produced by: Erich Pommer; Eduard Kubat
- Starring: Helga Thomas; Paul Hartmann; Mady Christians
- Cinematography: Otto Baecker; Günther Krampf
- Music by: Guido Bagier
- Production company: Decla-Bioscop
- Distributed by: UFA
- Release date: 5 December 1923
- Running time: 86 minutes
- Country: Germany
- Languages: Silent; German intertitles

The Lost Shoe (German: Der verlorene Schuh) is a 1923 German silent fantasy film directed by Ludwig Berger and starring Helga Thomas, Paul Hartmann and Mady Christians. Its plot is loosely based on that of Cinderella. It was shot at the Babelsberg Studios in Berlin. The film's sets were designed by the art director Rudolf Bamberger. The film premiered on 5 December 1923 at the Ufa-Palast am Zoo in Berlin. It was produced by Decla-Bioscop which was by then part of the large UFA conglomerate.

== Cast ==
- Helga Thomas as Marie
- Paul Hartmann as Anselm Franz
- Frida Richard as Patin
- Hermann Thimig as Baron Steiß-Steßling
- Lucie Höflich as Countess Benrat
- Mady Christians as Violante
- Olga Chekhova as Estella
- Max Gülstorff as Baron von Cucoli
- Gertrud Eysoldt as Rauerin
- Leonhard Haskel as Prince Habakuk XXVI
- Werner Hollmann as Count Ekelmann
- Georg John as Jon
- Emilie Kurz as Princess Alloysia
- Paula Conrada Schlenther as Princess Anastasia
- Arnold Korff

== Bibliography ==
- Hardt, Ursula. From Caligari to California: Erich Pommer's life in the International Film Wars. Berghahn Books, 1996.
