= Ludwig Berger (director) =

German film director (1892-1969)

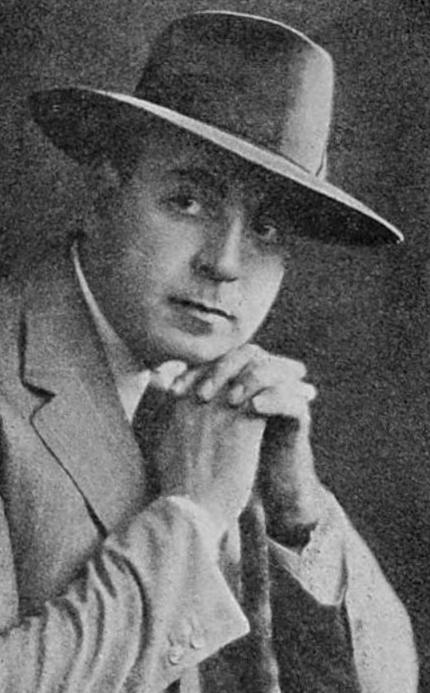
- Born: Ludwig Bamberger; 6 January 1892; Mainz, German Empire
- Died: 18 May 1969 (aged 77); Schlangenbad, West Germany
- Occupations: Film director, screenwriter
- Years active: 1920–1969

Ludwig Berger (born Ludwig Bamberger; 6 January 1892 – 18 May 1969) was a German-Jewish film director, screenwriter and theatre director. He directed more than 30 films between 1920 and 1969. Berger began working in the German film industry during the Weimar Republic. At Decla-Bioscop and later UFA he established a reputation as a leading director of silent films. He emigrated to Hollywood, but was unable to establish himself and returned to Europe. He subsequently worked both in France and Germany. He was a member of the jury at the 6th Berlin International Film Festival.

Berger also translated a few plays of Shakespeare, including Cymbeline, Hamlet, and Timon of Athens. His elder brother was the set designer Rudolf Bamberger who was killed in 1945.

== Selected filmography ==
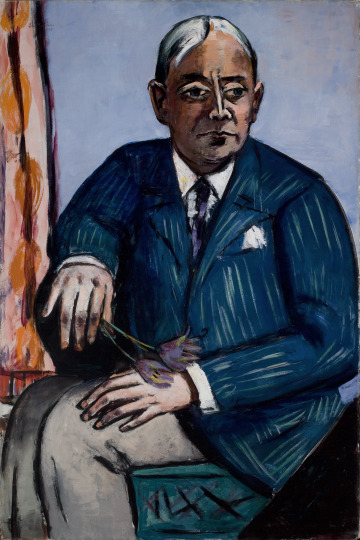
Portrait by Max Beckmann

=== Film ===
- The Mayor of Zalamea (1920)
- The Story of Christine von Herre (1921)
- A Glass of Water (1923)
- The Lost Shoe (1923)
- A Waltz Dream (1925)
- The Master of Nuremberg (1927)
- Queen Louise (dir. Karl Grune, 1927)
- Sins of the Fathers (1928)
- The Woman from Moscow (1928)
- The Burning Heart (1929)
- The Vagabond King (1930)
- Playboy of Paris (1930)
- The Little Cafe (1931)
- I by Day, You by Night (1932)
- Early to Bed (1933)
- Waltz War (1933)
- Court Waltzes (1933)
- Pygmalion (1937)
- Three Waltzes (1938)
- Ergens in Nederland (1940)
- The Thief of Bagdad (1940)
- The Immortal Face (1947)
- Ballerina (1950) also known as "Poor Little Ballerina"
- Stresemann (dir. Alfred Braun, 1957)

Ludwig Berger's grave at the Waldfriedhof in Mainz-Mombach.

=== Television ===
- 1954: Die Spieler — based on The Gamblers by Nikolai Gogol
- 1954: Der Schauspieldirektor — based on Der Schauspieldirektor by Wolfgang Amadeus Mozart
- 1955: Frau Mozart
- 1955: Undine — based on Ondine by Jean Giraudoux
- 1957: Der Tod des Sokrates — based on Phaedo by Plato
- 1958: Der Widerspenstigen Zähmung — based on The Taming of the Shrew
- 1958: Was ihr wollt — based on Twelfth Night
- 1958: Viel Lärm um nichts — based on Much Ado About Nothing
- 1958: Wie es euch gefällt — based on As You Like It
- 1958: Maß für Maß — based on Measure for Measure
- 1958: Ein Sommernachtstraum — based on A Midsummer Night's Dream
- 1959: Das Paradies und die Peri — based on Paradise and the Peri and Lalla-Rookh
- 1960: Die Nacht in Zaandam
- 1961: Hermann und Dorothea — based on Hermann and Dorothea by Johann Wolfgang von Goethe
- 1962: Alpenkönig und Menschenfeind — based on a play by Ferdinand Raimund
- 1964: Ottiliens Tollheiten
- 1967: Samen von Kraut und Unkraut – Drei Szenen aus der Geschichte Hessens
- 1968: Odysseus auf Ogygia — based on a play by Fritz von Unruh
- 1969: Demetrius (co-director: Heribert Wenk) — based on Demetrius by Friedrich Schiller
