= Lothar Müthel =

German stage and film actor and director

Lothar Müthel (né Lothar Max Lütcke; 18 February 1896 – 4 September 1964) was a German stage and film actor and director.

== Career ==
Müthel was born in Berlin, where he attended the acting school of Max Reinhardt, Schauspielschule, Berlin. Following the Anchluss of Austria to Nazi Germany, Müthel was appointed as director of the Burgtheater in Vienna. He held that position from 1939 until the fall of the Nazi regime in 1945. Under his directorship in 1943, a notoriously extreme production of The Merchant of Venice was staged at the Burgtheater, with Werner Krauss as Shylock.

== Death ==
Müthel died in Frankfurt am Main at age 68.

== Selected filmography ==
- The Galley Slave (1919)
- The Golem: How He Came into the World (1920) as Knight Florian
- The Woman in Heaven (1920) as Feodor
- The Mayor of Zalamea (1920) as Juan
- The Night of Queen Isabeau (1920) as Jehan
- Destiny (1921) as the messenger
- The False Dimitri (1922) as the Polish envoy
- Lucrezia Borgia (1922) as Juan Borgia
- Goetz von Berlichingen of the Iron Hand (1925) as Brother Martin
- Faust (1926) as the monk
- Yorck (1931) as General von Clausewitz
