= Warning Shadows =

1923 film by Arthur Robison

- Directed by: Arthur Robison
- Written by: Arthur Robison; Rudolf Schneider
- Produced by: Enrico Dieckmann; Willy Seibold
- Starring: Alexander Granach; Max Gülstorff
- Cinematography: Fritz Arno Wagner
- Production company: Pan-Film
- Release date: 1923
- Running time: 85 minutes
- Country: Germany
- Languages: Silent film German intertitles

Warning Shadows (German: Schatten – Eine nächtliche Halluzination translating to Shadows – A Nocturnal Hallucination) is a 1923 German silent film directed and co-written by Arthur Robison, and starring Fritz Kortner and Ruth Weyher. It is considered part of German Expressionism.

== Plot ==
During a dinner given by a wealthy count (Fritz Kortner), his beautiful wife (Ruth Weyher) and four of her suitors come together at the 19th-century German manor. A magician (Alexander Granach), referred to as "Shadowplayer" in the cast list, rescues the count's marriage by giving all the guests a vision of what might happen if the count cannot restrain his jealousy and the suitors continue to make advances towards his wife. The count challenges the man he perceives as his rival (Gustav von Wangenheim) to a duel. The film has a happy ending as violence is averted and the count and his wife save their marriage. However, it is left unclear whether events at the party actually occurred, or whether it was all an illusion conjured up by the magician.

== Cast ==
- Alexander Granach as Shadowplayer
- Fritz Kortner as The count
- Ruth Weyher as His wife
- Gustav von Wangenheim as Her lover
- Lilli Herder as Dienstmaedchen
- Fritz Rasp as Diener
- Karl Platen as 2. Diener
- Eugen Rex as 1. Kavalier
- Max Gülstorff as 2. Kavalier
- Ferdinand von Alten as 3. Kavalier
- Rudolf Klein-Rogge

== Production ==
Troy Howarth writes "The film is fascinating primarily on a visual level. As an exercise in Expressionism, it fully deserves inclusion in the canon of great German horror films", comparing Robison's film to the best of F.W. Murnau and Fritz Lang. He says however that the film runs out of steam toward the end and the characters were too stereotypical to be very interesting. Siegfried Kracauer ranked it among the masterpieces of German cinema, but lamented that it came and went all but unnoticed by the general public.

Director Arthur Robison was born in Chicago, Illinois in 1883, but grew up in Germany where he became an established writer-director in the German silent film industry. His first film was the 1916 German horror film A Night of Horror, and his last film was the 1935 sound remake of The Student of Prague. Actors Von Wangenheim and Granach were reunited again here after both costarred in Nosferatu (1922).

== Literary significance ==
Referred to in Brideshead Revisited by Evelyn Waugh is Anthony Blanche's description of Sebastian's companion Kurt: "He is like the footman in "Warning Shadows" - a great clod of a German..." (presumably the character portrayed by Fritz Rasp).

== Legacy ==
Warning Shadows inspired Lucile Hadžihalilović's 2025 fantasy drama film The Ice Tower. Hadžihalilović said: "The haunting interplay between realism and expressionism, using chiaroscuro like a language of its own—between on-screen and off-screen space. The theme of the 'double' has never been more compelling, with the shadow-puppeteer's show mirroring the relationships between his guests."

== See also ==
- List of films made in Weimar Germany
