= Fritz Kortner =

Austrian actor and theatre director (1892–1970)

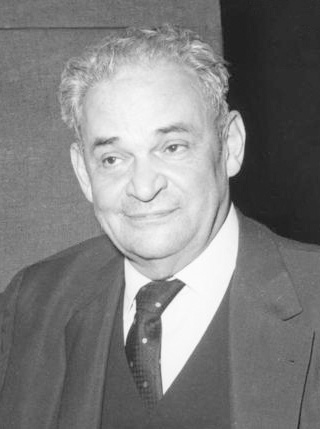
- Kortner in 1959
- Born: Fritz Nathan Kohn; 12 May 1892; Vienna, Austria-Hungary
- Died: 22 July 1970 (aged 78); Munich, West Germany
- Burial place: Munich Waldfriedhof
- Occupations: Actor, theatre director
- Years active: 1915–1968
- Spouse: Johanna Hofer (m. 1924)
- Children: 2

Fritz Kortner (born Fritz Nathan Kohn, 12 May 1892 – 22 July 1970) was an Austrian stage and film actor and theatre director.

== Life and career ==
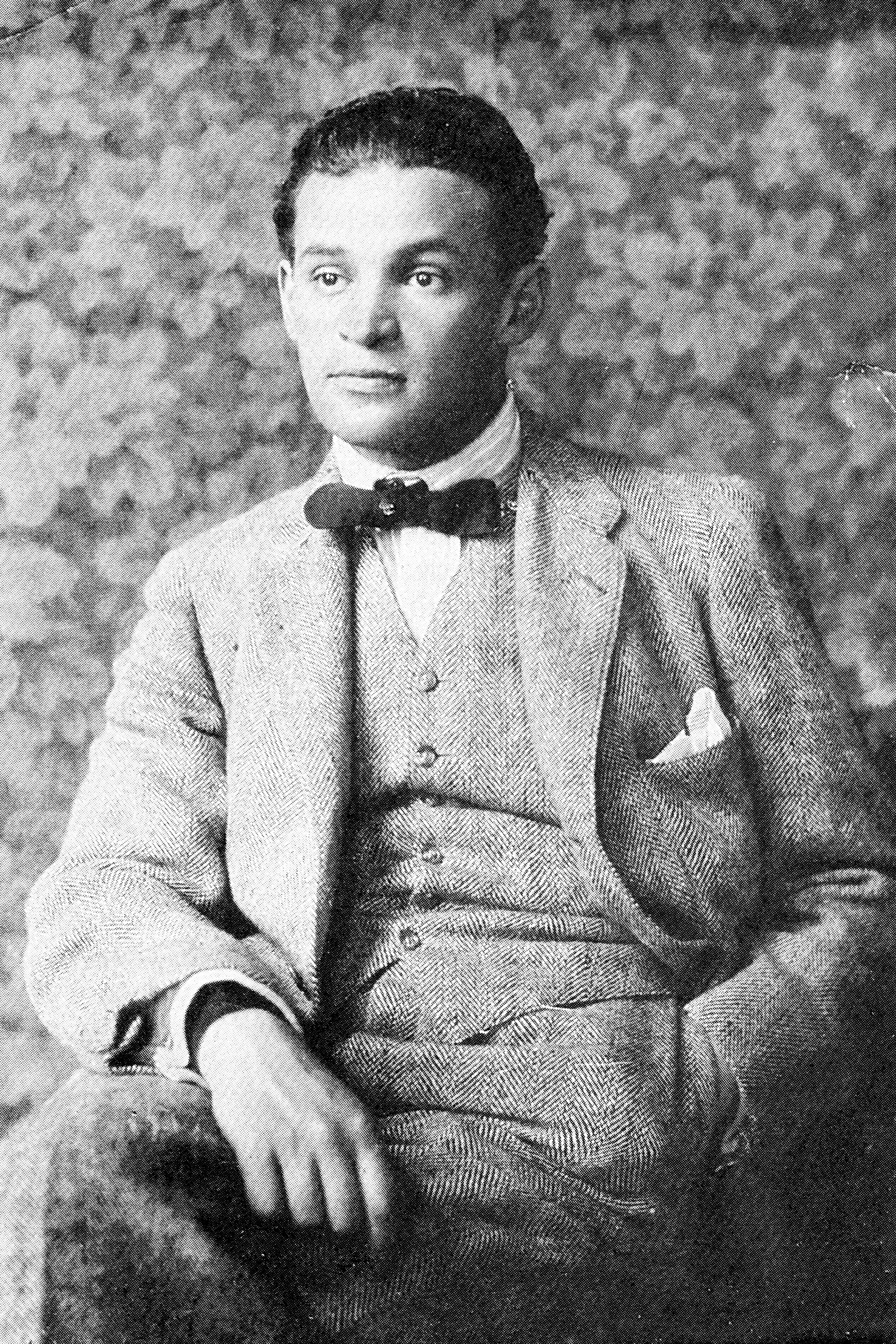
Kortner at the age of 19, c. 1911

Kortner was born in Vienna as Fritz Nathan Kohn into a Jewish family. He studied at the Vienna Academy of Music and Dramatic Art. After graduating, he joined Max Reinhardt in Berlin in 1911 and then Leopold Jessner in 1916. After his breakthrough performance in Ernst Toller's Transfiguration in 1919, he became one of Germany's best-known character actors and the nation's foremost performer of Expressionist works. He also appeared in over ninety films beginning in 1916.

His specialty was in playing sinister and threatening roles, although he also appeared in the title role of Dreyfus (1930). He originally gained attention for his explosive energy on stage and his powerful voice; but as the 1920s progressed, his work began to incorporate greater realism, as he opted for a more controlled delivery and greater use of gestures.

With the coming to power of the Nazis, Kortner fled Germany in 1933 with his wife, actress Johanna Hofer, returning first to his native Vienna and, from there, on to Great Britain, and finally, in 1937, to the United States, where he found work as a character actor and theater director.

He returned to West Germany in 1949, where he became noted for his innovative staging and direction of classics by William Shakespeare and Molière, such as a Richard III (1964) in which the king crawls over piles of corpses at the finale.

== Death ==
Kortner died at Munich in 1970, aged 78, of leukemia.

== Selected filmography ==
- Manya, die Türkin (1915)
- Im Banne der Vergangenheit (1915)
- Das Geheimnis von D.14 (1915)
- Police Nr. 1111 (1915) – Mac Waldy
- Das zweite Leben (1916)
- Martyr of His Heart (1918) – Ludwig van Beethoven
- The Other I (1918) – Professor
- Frauenehre (1918, Short) – Mathias Enger
- Der Sonnwendhof (1918)
- Else of Erlenhof (1919)
- The Eye of the Buddha (1919) – indischer Diener
- Without Witnesses (1919)
- Satan (1920) – Pharao Amenhotep
- Gerechtigkeit (1920)
- Va banque (1920) – S. M. Wulff
- The Brothers Karamazov (1921) – Der alte Karamasoff
- Catherine the Great (1920) – Potemkin
- The Skull of Pharaoh's Daughter (1920)
- The Night of Queen Isabeau (1920) – Connetable
- Die Verschleierte (1920)
- Christian Wahnschaffe (1920) – Iwan Becker
- The Maharaja's Favourite Wife (1921) – Bruder von Maharadscha Bhima
- The Strongest Instinct (1921)
- The Railway King (1921)
- The House on the Moon (1921) – Jan van Haag – Wachsfigurenhändler
- The House of Torment (1921) – Arzt
- Hashish, the Paradise of Hell (1921) – Sultan
- The Conspiracy in Genoa (1921) – Gianettino
- Country Roads and the Big City (1921) – Mendel Hammerstein
- Danton (1921)
- Aus dem Schwarzbuch eines Polizeikommissars (1921) – Der Krüppel
- The Hunt for the Truth (1921)
- Backstairs (1921) – Der Postbote
- The Railway King (1921)
- On the Red Cliff (1922) – Henning Rinkens
- Luise Millerin (1922) – Miller
- The Earl of Essex (1922) – Lord Nottingham
- Peter the Great (1922) – Patriarch Adrian
- A Dying Nation (1922)
- The Call of Destiny (1922)
- What Belongs to Darkness (1922) – Gangster
- At the Edge of the Great City (1922)
- Nora (1923) – Krogstadt, Lawyer
- Schatten – Eine nächtliche Halluzination (1923) – The count
- A Woman, an Animal, a Diamond (1923) – Urmensch
- Le revenant au baiser mortel (1923)
- Poor Sinner (1923) – Canary
- The Hands of Orlac (1924) – Nera
- Modern Marriages (1924) – Diener
- Kiedy kobieta zdradza meza (1924) – Lokaj
- Doctor Wislizenus (1924) – Dr. Wislizenus
- Should We Be Silent? (1926) – Der annoncierender Arzt
- The Life of Beethoven (1927) – Ludwig van Beethoven
- Mata Hari (1927) – Graf Bobrykin
- Students' Love (1927) – Karsten
- Alpine Tragedy (1927) – Mairas Vater
- Caught in Berlin's Underworld (1927) – Lord
- The Mistress of the Governor (1927) – Zarewitsch Alexander / Gouverneurs Sohn
- Mary Stuart (1927) – Marschall Bothwell
- Dame Care (1928) – Der alte Meyhöfer
- Odette (1928) – Frontenac
- Spy of Madame Pompadour (1928) – Zar Paul von Rußland
- The Last Night (1928) – Montaloup
- Pandora's Box (1929) – Dr. Ludwig Schön
- Somnambul (1929) – Fabrikant Bingen
- The Woman One Longs For (1929) – Dr. Karoff
- The Woman in the Advocate's Gown (1929) – Konsul Backhaug
- The Ship of Lost Souls (1929) – Kapitän Vela – Captain Fernando Vela
- The Night of Terror (1929) – Prince Wagarin
- Atlantik (1929) – Heinrich Thomas, author
- Giftgas (1929) – Konzernpräsident Straaten
- The Other (1930) – Prosecutor Hallers
- Dreyfus (1930) – Alfred Dreyfus
- Menschen im Käfig (1930) – Captain Kell
- The Great Longing (1930) – Himself, Fritz Kortner
- The Virtuous Sinner (1931, director)
- Danton (1931) – Danton
- The Murderer Dimitri Karamazov (1931) – Dimitri Karamasoff
- You Don't Forget Such a Girl (1932, director)
- Chu Chin Chow (1934) – Abu Hasan
- Little Friend (1934) – Giant
- Evensong (1934) – Arthur Kober
- Abdul the Damned (1935) – Sultan Abdul Hamid II / Kelar – his double
- The Crouching Beast (1935) – Ahmed Bey
- Pagliacci (1936, writer)
- Midnight Menace (1937) – Minister Peters of Grovnia
- The Purple V (1943) – Thomas Forster
- The Strange Death of Adolf Hitler (1943) – Bauer
- The Hitler Gang (1944) – Gregor Strasser
- The Wife of Monte Cristo (1946) – Maillard
- Somewhere in the Night (1946) – Anzelmo aka Dr. Oracle
- The Razor's Edge (1946) – Kosti
- The Brasher Doubloon (1947) – Rudolph Vannier
- Berlin Express (1948) – Franzen
- The Vicious Circle (1948) – Joseph Schwartz
- The Last Illusion (1949) – Professor Mauthner
- The Orplid Mystery (1950) – Mr. P. L. Hoopman
- Bluebeard (1951) – Haushofsmeister
- Secrets of the City (1955, director)
- Sarajevo (1955, director)
- Lysistrata (1961, TV film, director)
- Clavigo (1970, TV film, director)

== Autobiographical works ==
- 1971: Letzten Endes. Fragmente. (posthumous autobiography, edited by Johanna Kortner)
- 1996: Aller Tage Abend. Autobiographie. Droemer-Knaur, München, 1996, ISBN 978-3-426-02336-5.
  - Aller Tage Abend. Autobiographie. Alexander Verlag, Berlin 2005, ISBN 978-3-89581-098-5.
- 2005: Aller Tage Abend. Auszüge, gelesen von Fritz Kortner. Alexander Verlag, Berlin ISBN 978-3-89581-137-1.
