= The Love Trap (1925 film) =

1925 film

- Directed by: Erich Schönfelder; Richard Eichberg
- Written by: Hans Land; Helmuth Orthmann
- Produced by: Richard Eichberg
- Starring: Hans Wassmann; Maria Reisenhofer; Herbert Paulmüller
- Cinematography: Heinrich Gartner
- Production company: Richard Eichberg-Film
- Distributed by: Süd-Film
- Release date: 1 December 1925
- Running time: 84 minutes
- Country: Germany
- Languages: Silent; German intertitles

The Love Trap or The Love Cage (German: Der Liebeskäfig) is a 1925 German silent film directed by Erich Schönfelder and Richard Eichberg and starring Hans Wassmann, Maria Reisenhofer and Herbert Paulmüller. The film's sets were designed by the art director Kurt Richter.

== Cast ==
- Hans Wassmann as Gottlob Degen
- Maria Reisenhofer as Emma Degen, seine Frau
- Herbert Paulmüller as August Waltjen
- Johannes Riemann as Gert Waltjen, sein Sohn
- Carl Auen as Michael Cornelius
- Elena Lunda as Susi Verden
- E. Herrmann as Hermann Schröder
- Fritz Carl Perponcher as Eleganter junger Mann
- Maria Forescu as Dettas Zofe
- Herr Rieser as Eleganter junger Mann
- Carl Jönsson as Theaterdirektor
- Bruno Kastner
- Frieda Lehndorf
- Lee Parry
