= Jaro Fürth =

Austrian actor

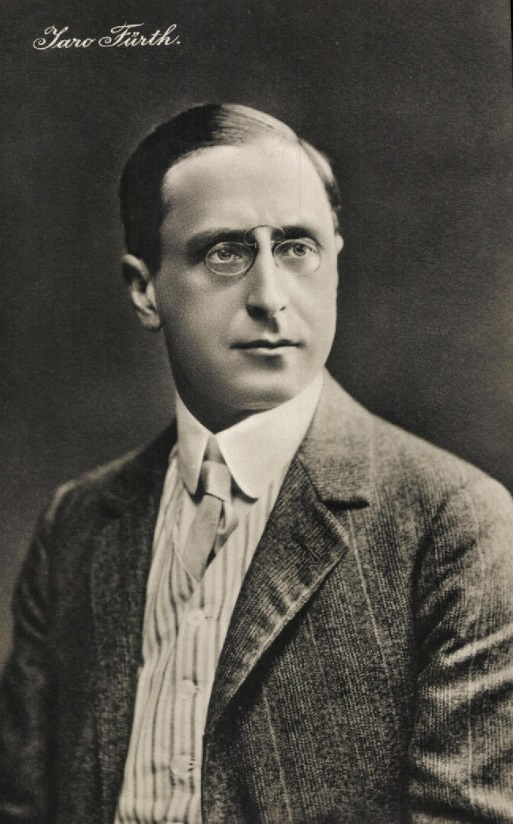
- Born: Jaroslav Edwin Fürth; 21 April 1871; Prague, Kingdom of Bohemia, Austria-Hungary
- Died: 12 November 1945 (aged 74); Vienna, Austria
- Occupation: Actor
- Years active: 1900–1935

Jaro Fürth (born Jaroslav Edwin Fürth; 21 April 1871 – 12 November 1945) was an Austrian stage and film actor.

== Early life ==
Fürth was born to Jewish parents in Prague. Initially he studied law, but began his acting career under the tutelage of Alexander Römpler before taking stage engagements in Scandinavia, performing in roles created by Henrik Ibsen. In 1905 he travelled to Vienna, where he received an engagement at the Deutschen Volkstheater.

== Film career ==
In the late 1910s he went to Berlin and began appearing in silent films. Under the direction of F.W. Murnau, he appeared in such films as: The Head of Janus (1920) and Satanas (1920), and after that followed with roles in films such as Das Blut der Ahnen (The Blood of the Ancestors) (1920) and Der falsche Dimitry (The False Dmitry) (1922). He played Councilor Rumfort in Georg Wilhelm Pabst's 1925 drama Joyless Street, opposite Danish actress Asta Nielsen, with Swedish actress Greta Garbo, playing his daughter.

Fürth would transition to the era of sound film with ease, and would become a notable character actor throughout the late 1920s and 1930s, appearing in such films as G. W. Pabst's drama Diary of a Lost Girl (1929) opposite American actress Louise Brooks, and Karel Lamač's Die Fledermaus (1931) opposite Czech actress Anny Ondra.

== Nazi persecution and death ==
Fürth left Germany after the German National-Socialists seized power in 1933 and he moved to Vienna. After the 1938 Anschluss, in which Germany occupied and annexed Austria, Fürth was forced into retirement from his acting career and was deported by the Nazis to Theresienstadt concentration camp in 1942. He lived to see the end of the war, but died several months later in Vienna at the age of 74.

== Selected filmography ==
- The Head of Janus (1920)
- Satanas (1920)
- The Railway King (1921)
- The False Dimitri (1922)
- Money in the Streets (1922)
- Two Worlds (1922)
- I.N.R.I. (1923)
- La Boheme (1923)
- His Wife, The Unknown (1923)
- The Doomed (1924)
- Arabella (1924)
- Joyless Street (1925)
- Tragedy (1925)
- Ballettratten (1925)
- The Island of Dreams (1925)
- The Woman from Berlin (1925)
- The Wig (1925)
- Comedians (1925)
- Malice (1926)
- The Red Mouse (1926)
- Lace (1926)
- Vienna - Berlin (1926)
- Superfluous People (1926)
- Eyes Open, Harry! (1926)
- The Brothers Schellenberg (1926)
- Children of No Importance (1926)
- The Eleven Schill Officers (1926)
- The Transformation of Dr. Bessel (1927)
- Attorney for the Heart (1927)
- The Indiscreet Woman (1927)
- Flirtation (1927)
- Two Under the Stars (1927)
- Carnival Magic (1927)
- The Lady and the Chauffeur (1928)
- Panic (1928)
- Children's Tragedy (1928)
- Gentlemen Among Themselves (1929)
- Diary of a Lost Girl (1929)
- A Mother's Love (1929)
- Fräulein Else (1929)
- The Youths (1929)
- Tragedy of Youth (1929)
- Somnambul (1929)
- The Woman Everyone Loves Is You (1929)
- It's You I Have Loved (1929)
- Napoleon at Saint Helena (1929)
- The Hound of the Baskervilles (1929)
- The Immortal Vagabond (1930)
- Police Spy 77 (1930)
- The Yellow House of Rio (1931)
- Die Fledermaus (1931)
- Reckless Youth (1931)
- Dreaming Lips (1932)
- The Golden Anchor (1932)
- The Naked Truth (1932)
- Invisible Opponent (1933)
- Little Mother (1935)
