= Genuine (1920 film) =

1920 film directed by Robert Wiene

- Directed by: Robert Wiene
- Screenplay by: Carl Mayer
- Produced by: Erich Pommer
- Starring: Fern Andra; Hans Heinrich von Twardowski; Ernst Gronau; Harald Paulsen
- Cinematography: Willy Hameister
- Production company: Decla-Bioscop AG
- Distributed by: Decla-Bioscop-Verleih
- Release date: 2 September 1920 (Berlin)
- Running time: 88 minutes
- Country: Germany

Genuine (original German title: Genuine, die Tragödie eines seltsamen Hauses; literally: Genuine, the tragedy of a strange house) is a 1920 German silent horror film directed by Robert Wiene. It was also released as Genuine: A Tale of a Vampire. Director Wiene created Genuine as a follow-up to his massively successful film The Cabinet of Dr. Caligari, using the same writer and cinematographer who had worked on the earlier film. Production designer Cesar Klein even returned to contribute his bizarre Caligari-like imagery to the film.

The film's eponymous character, Genuine, is not actually a vampire, but rather a "vamp" (succubus) who uses her powers of seduction to torment and control the men who love her. The plot utilizes the it was all just a dream-type ending, as the proceedings are revealed to be a dream suffered by a man who falls asleep while reading a scary book. The film did not do well at the box office, but Wiene returned to form with his 1924 opus The Hands of Orlac. Genuine was edited down into a 43-minute condensed version, which is the cut that has been most commonly available. The complete film is available on YouTube.

== Plot ==
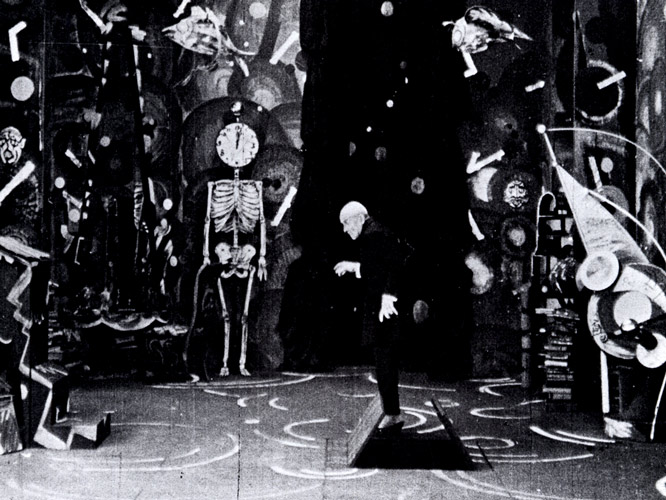
A scene from the film

Since completing a portrait of Genuine, a high priestess, Percy becomes irritable and withdrawn. He loses interest in painting and refuses to see his friends, preferring to spend his time alone with the portrait in his study. After turning down a wealthy patron's offer to buy the picture, Percy falls asleep while reading stories of Genuine's life. Genuine comes to life from the painting and escapes.

Genuine is purchased at a slave market by an old eccentric named Lord Melo. He learns that she had been sold into slavery when her people were conquered by a rival tribe. Melo locks her in an opulent chamber beneath his house, though she begs to be set free.

Guyard the barber visits Lord Melo every day at noon, though today he sends his young nephew Florian in his place. Meanwhile, Genuine breaks out of her underground prison, climbs the immense staircase to find Florian shaving the sleeping Lord Melo. She bewitches him into slitting Melo's throat with a straight razor. Florian falls under Genuine's spell, but when she demands that he prove his love for her by taking his own life, he cannot go through with it and is forced to make his escape.

Melo's grandson Percy arrives at the house. He too becomes infatuated with Genuine, quickly forgetting any questions he has about his grandfather's sudden death. Although Genuine loves Percy in return, their romance is destined to be short-lived. Guyard, stirred up by Florian's tales of murder and witchcraft, arms a mob with scythes and bludgeons and storms Melo's house. Florian, still infatuated with Genuine, secretly makes his own way inside, determined that he shall have her, or no one will.

== Cast ==
- Fern Andra as Genuine
- Hans Heinrich von Twardowski as Florian
- Ernst Gronau as Lord Melo
- Harald Paulsen Percy Melo
- Albert Bennefeld as Henry Curzon
- John Gottowt as Guyard
- Louis Brody as The Malay

== Release ==
=== Home media ===
On 18 November 2014, Kino Lorber released a restoration of Wiene's earlier film The Cabinet of Dr. Caligari. A tinted 43-minute abridgement of Genuine was included as a part of the film's special features. A black-and-white transfer of the same abridgement was released on DVD by Alpha Video in 2015, supplemented by the 1928 American short film The Fall of the House of Usher. The complete 88-minute version of Genuine has never had a home video release.
