= The Student of Prague (1913 film) =

1913 film

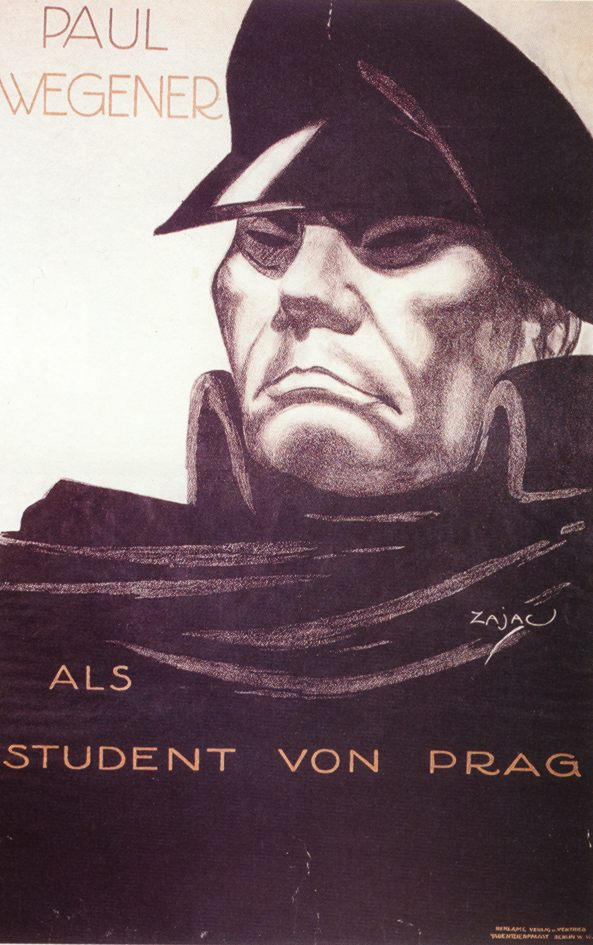
- Directed by: Stellan Rye
- Written by: Hanns Heinz Ewers
- Produced by: Paul Wegener
- Starring: Paul Wegener; John Gottowt; Grete Berger
- Cinematography: Guido Seeber
- Music by: Josef Weiss
- Production company: Deutsche Bioscop
- Distributed by: Deutsche Bioscop
- Release date: 22 August 1913
- Running time: 85 minutes
- Country: German Empire
- Languages: Silent film German intertitles

The Student of Prague

The Student of Prague (German: Der Student von Prag, also known as A Bargain with Satan) is a 1913 German silent horror film. It is loosely based on "William Wilson", a short story by Edgar Allan Poe, the poem The December Night by Alfred de Musset, and Faust. The film was remade in 1926, under the same title The Student of Prague. Another remake was produced in 1935. The film stars Paul Wegener in his film debut. It is generally deemed to be the first German art film. Composer Josef Weiss wrote a piano score to accompany the film. It was the first film score written for a German language film in the history of cinema.

It was shot at the Babelsberg Studios and on location around Prague. The film's sets were designed by the art director Robert A. Dietrich.

== Plot summary ==
In Prague in 1820, a poor university student named Balduin is the city's wildest carouser and greatest swordsman. Despondent over his lack of funds, he is approached by a diabolical old gentleman dressed in black named Scapinelli. A local young woman named Lyduschka is infatuated with Balduin and begins to follow most of the action from a distance. Balduin becomes smitten with Countess Margit Schwarzenberg after rescuing her from drowning, but – despite receiving a locket from her – knows he cannot pursue this love because of his poverty. Scapinelli, who is always in a gleeful mood, offers Balduin 100,000 pieces of gold in exchange for any item to be found in his student lodgings. Balduin agrees and signs a contract thinking he owns nothing, but is astonished when Scapinelli calls forth Balduin's reflection from the mirror and absconds with it. The baffled student realizes that he now produces no mirror image.

Recovering, Balduin – now flush with cash – attempts to woo Countess Margit. At the Hofburg Palace, the resplendently attired Balduin renews his acquaintanceship with the Countess, but both Lyduschka and his mirror double put in appearances before the Countess covertly gifts Balduin with her handkerchief. Balduin and the Countess meet secretly at an old Jewish graveyard, but the double appears again and terrorizes both lovers. Lyduschka tips off Baron Waldis-Schwarzenberg, the Countess's fiancé and cousin, about Balduin's amorous efforts (she has stolen the handkerchief as evidence). Incensed, the Baron challenges Balduin to a duel with sabres.

Privately, Count Schwarzenberg – the Countess's father and the Baron's uncle – begs Balduin not to kill the Baron, as he is the last surviving heir to the family. Balduin agrees but is thwarted when his double again appears at the duel in his place and kills the rival suitor. Distraught, Balduin sneaks into Margit's room and continues to petition for her affections. She is accommodating, but becomes frightened by Balduin's lack of a mirror reflection followed quickly by the sudden appearance of the double. She collapses in a swoon.

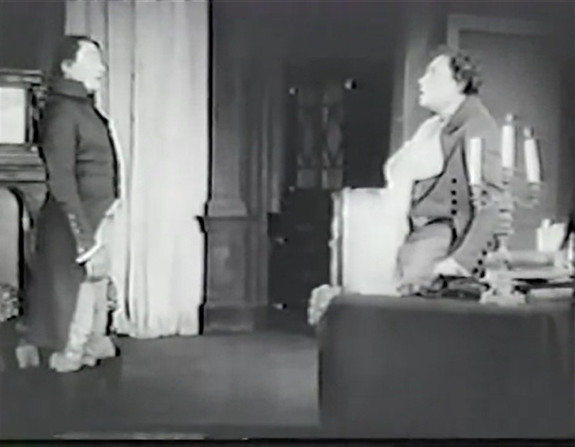
Balduin's double appears

Utterly dejected, Balduin returns to his own now lavish lodgings and retrieves a pistol. When the double appears there he fires at it and it vanishes, but soon he becomes stricken himself and falls dead. Scapinelli arrives, takes the contract Balduin signed with him and tears it up, throws it like confetti and departs happily. In a coda, we see Balduin's double sitting atop his fresh grave, stroking a raven, and glowering menacingly at the viewer.

== Cast ==
- Paul Wegener as Balduin
- John Gottowt as Scapinelli
- Grete Berger as Countess Margit
- Lyda Salmonova as Lyduschka
- Lothar Körner as Count von Schwarzenberg
- Fritz Weidemann as Baron Waldis-Schwarzenberg

== Cultural significance ==
The Student of Prague is considered to be the first German art film, and it helped lift cinema from its low-class, fairground origins to a viable art form. It was a critical and commercial success. Audiences flocked to see the film, in part because it tapped into a very real sense of dissociation and alienation inherent in a society that was struggling with the burgeoning collapse of the German Empire.

The film's star, Paul Wegener, was an avowed champion of the medium after realizing the potential of cinema to transcend the limits of conventional theater. Cinematographer Guido Seeber utilized groundbreaking camera tricks to create the effect of the Doppelgänger (mirror double), producing a seamless double exposure. Hanns Heinz Ewers was a noted writer of horror and fantasy stories whose involvement with the screenplay lent a much needed air of respectability to the fledgling art form.

The film also stimulated interest in the still very new field of psychoanalysis. Otto Rank published an extensive plot summary of the film in his article "Der Doppelgänger", which ran in Sigmund Freud's academic journal Imago in 1914. Examples of the Doppelgänger are most prevalent in literature as a narcissistic defense against sexual love, according to Rank, who described how the mirror image of the student shows up in erotic situations to deny Balduin any progress in his attempts to woo the countess.

The fantastic themes of the film went on to become a major influence on Weimar cinema, continuing the exploration of social change and insecurity in the aftermath of World War I. Expressionism grew out of the tormented psyches of artists and writers coming to terms with their individual experiences. The use of chiaroscuro (sharp contrasts between light and shadow) was already established on the set of The Student of Prague, but was then carried further by Weimar productions like Das Cabinet des Dr. Caligari.

== References in popular culture ==
The film is referenced in the 1933 detective story "The Image in the Mirror" by Dorothy Sayers, in which Lord Peter Wimsey helps clear Mr. Duckworthy, a man wrongly suspected of murder. Among other things Duckworthy tells:

"When I was seven or eight, my mother took me with her to see a film called The Student of Prague. [...] It was a costume piece about a young man at the university who sold himself to the devil, and one day his reflection came stalking out of the mirror on its own, and went about committing dreadful crimes, so that everybody thought it was him."

(In the story, Mr. Duckworthy had what seemed a similar experience – but Wimsey eventually proves that it had a rational explanation involving no supernatural agency.)
