= Max Pohl =

Austrian actor (1855–1935)

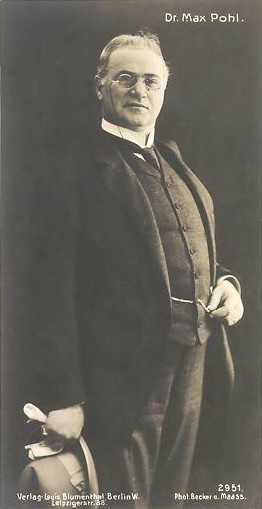
- Pohl c. 1922
- Born: 10 December 1855; Nikolsburg, Moravia, Austrian Empire
- Died: 7 April 1935 (aged 79); Berlin, Germany
- Occupation: Actor
- Years active: 1876–1931

Max Pohl (10 December 1855 – 7 April 1935) was an Austrian stage and film actor.

== Selected filmography ==
- The Black Tulip Festival (1920)
- The Marquise of Armiani (1920)
- The Fear of Women (1921)
- The Oath of Stephan Huller (1921)
- Monna Vanna (1922)
- Lucrezia Borgia (1922)
- Man by the Wayside (1923)
- The Hungarian Princess (1923)
- Living Buddhas (1925)
- Queen Louise (1927)
- The Murderer Dimitri Karamazov (1931)
- The Brothers Karamazov (1931)

== Bibliography ==
- Glen W. Gadberry. Theatre in the Third Reich, the Prewar Years. Greenwood Publishing, 1995.
