= The Hunt for the Truth =

1921 film directed by Karl Grune

- German: Die Jagd nach der Wahrheit
- Directed by: Karl Grune
- Written by: Julius Sternheim
- Produced by: Hanns Lippmann
- Starring: Erika Glässner; Fritz Kortner; Rudolf Forster
- Cinematography: Karl Hasselmann
- Production company: Gloria-Film
- Distributed by: UFA
- Release date: 25 November 1921
- Country: Germany
- Languages: Silent; German intertitles

The Hunt for the Truth (German: Die Jagd nach der Wahrheit) is a 1921 German silent drama film directed by Karl Grune and starring Erika Glässner, Fritz Kortner and Rudolf Forster.

The film's sets were designed by the art director Karl Görge.

== Cast ==
- Erika Glässner as Claire
- Fritz Kortner as Dr. Jack Brinken, court chemist
- Rudolf Forster as Untersuchungsrichter
- Fritz Schulz as Robert, Claire's brother
- Georg H. Schnell as defense lawyer
- Ferdinand von Alten as district attorney
- Henry Bender as administrator / cabman
- Frida Richard as Frau des Verwalters
- Margarete Kupfer as neighbour

== Bibliography ==
- Bock, Hans-Michael & Töteberg, Michael. Das Ufa-Buch. Zweitausendeins, 1992.
