= Stellan Rye =

Danish film director

- Born: 4 July 1880; Randers, Denmark
- Died: 14 November 1914 (aged 34); France
- Occupation: Film director
- Military service
- Cause of death: Died as prisoner of war
- Allegiance: German Empire
- Branch: Reichsheer
- Service years: 1914

Stellan Rye (4 July 1880 – 14 November 1914) was a Danish-born film director, active in the early 20th century. Rye was born in Randers.

In 1913 he created (together with Hanns Heinz Ewers and Paul Wegener) the silent film Der Student von Prag (The Student of Prague). At the outbreak of World War I he joined the Reichsheer (German Army). He died in France, a prisoner of war.
