= Rochus Gliese =

German actor

- Born: 6 January 1891; Berlin, German Empire
- Died: 22 December 1978 (aged 87); Berlin, East Germany
- Occupations: Actor, director and production designer
- Years active: 1915-1967

Rochus Gliese (6 January 1891 — 22 December 1978) was a German actor, director, production designer, and Academy Award-nominated art director of early films from the 1910s and 1920s. He was born in Berlin.

He is most remembered in the United States for his work as an art director on the film Sunrise: A Song of Two Humans. Most of his other films did not receive wide release in the United States. His final film as a director was 1930's Chasing Fortune, though he did some behind-the-scenes roles through the 1930s and in the 1950s. His final work was 1955's Fidelio, where he worked as a set decorator.

He died in 1978 in Berlin.

== Main filmography ==
=== Director ===
- Rübezahl's Wedding (co-director: Paul Wegener, 1916)
- The Yogi (co-director: Paul Wegener, 1916)
- The Galley Slave (co-director: Paul Wegener, 1919)
- The Lost Shadow (1921)
- Duke Ferrante's End (director: Paul Wegener, 1922), uncredited
- The Burning Secret (1923)
- Comedy of the Heart (1924)
- The Found Bride (1925)
- The Pink Diamond (1926)
- People on Sunday (co-directors: Robert Siodmak, Edgar G. Ulmer, 1930)
- Chasing Fortune (1930)

=== Art director ===
- The Golem (1915)
- The Yogi (1916)
- Rübezahl's Wedding (1916)
- The Golem and the Dancing Girl (1917)
- Hans Trutz in the Land of Plenty (1917)
- The Foreign Prince (1918)
- Der Antiquar von Straßburg (1918)
- The Pied Piper of Hamelin (1918)
- Intoxication (1919)
- Malaria (1919)
- The Oyster Princess (1919)
- Helmsman Holk (1920)
- Catherine the Great (1920)
- The Burning Soil (1922)
- Alexandra (1922)
- Der Kampf ums Ich (1922)
- The Love Nest (1922)
- The Burning Secret (1923)
- The Expulsion (1923)
- Finances of the Grand Duke (1924)
- Sunrise: A Song of Two Humans (1927)
- The Main Event (1927)
- A City Upside Down (1933)
- Amphitryon (1935), costume designer
- Dance on the Volcano (1938)
- Ein Walzer mit dir (1943)
- Hanna Amon (1951)
- Ein Polterabend (1955)
- Fidelio (1956)

== See also ==
- List of German-speaking Academy Award winners and nominees
