= The Lost Shadow =

1921 film

- Directed by: Rochus Gliese
- Written by: Rochus Gliese; Paul Wegener
- Produced by: Paul Davidson; Paul Wegener
- Starring: Paul Wegener; Wilhelm Bendow; Adele Sandrock
- Cinematography: Karl Freund; Erich Waschneck
- Production company: PAGU
- Distributed by: UFA
- Release date: 3 February 1921
- Country: Germany
- Languages: Silent; German intertitles

The Lost Shadow (German: Der verlorene Schatten) is a 1921 German silent film directed by Rochus Gliese and starring Paul Wegener, Wilhelm Bendow and Adele Sandrock. The cinematographer was Karl Freund. The film's sets were designed by the art director Kurt Richter. It was shot at the Tempelhof Studios in Berlin. For some reason, the film was only released in the US in 1928. It is today considered a lost film.

This film was a remake of sorts of Paul Wegener's 1913 film The Student of Prague, which he had starred in, only this time giving the story a happy ending. The screenplay also incorporated the legend of the famed violinist Niccolò Paganini who was said to have murdered his wife and imprisoned her soul in his violin.

Director Gliese had previously designed the sets for Wegener's 1915 film The Golem, and later directed Wegener in The Golem and the Dancing Girl in 1917. He later also worked as a costume designer on Wegener's 1920 film The Golem: How He Came into the World. Thus Gliese was the only person to collaborate on all three of Wegener's "Golem" movies.

The film co-starred Greta Schröder, who later starred in F. W. Murnau's Nosferatu (1922). Cameraman Karl Freund later emigrated to the US and worked on many of the classic 1930s Universal horror films, including Dracula, Mad Love and Karloff's The Mummy.

== Plot ==
A homely but brilliant violinist named Sebaldus (Wegener) makes a bargain with a mysterious stranger (Sturm). He trades his shadow for the love of a young woman whom he is attracted to, and a magic violin. When the woman sees he has no shadow, she becomes terrified and enters a convent. The local townspeople run him out of town, thinking he is possessed. In the end, however, Sebaldus uses the magic violin to play a wonderful melody and the woman he loves returns and falls in love with him.

== Cast ==
- Paul Wegener as Sebaldus, der Stadtmusikant
- Wilhelm Bendow as Vetter Theobald
- Adele Sandrock as Äbtissin
- Hedwig Gutzeit as Frau des Bürgermeisters
- Leonhard Haskel as Bürgermeister
- Lyda Salmonova as Dorotheas Pflegeschwester Barbara
- Werner Schott as Graf Durande
- Greta Schröder as Gräfin Dorothea Durande
- Hans Sturm as Zauberkünstler Dapertutto

== Bibliography ==
- Eric Rentschler. German Film & Literature. Routledge, 2013.
