= Duke Ferrante's End =

1922 film

- Directed by: Paul Wegener; Rochus Gliese
- Written by: Paul Wegener
- Produced by: Samuel Rachmann
- Starring: Paul Wegener; Hans Sturm; Hugo Döblin
- Cinematography: Karl Freund
- Production company: Europäische Film-Allianz
- Release date: July 1922
- Running time: 88 minutes
- Country: Germany
- Languages: Silent; German intertitles

Duke Ferrante's End (German: Herzog Ferrantes Ende) is a 1922 German silent historical film directed by Paul Wegener and Rochus Gliese and starring Paul Wegener, Hans Sturm and Hugo Döblin. It was shot at the EFA Studios in Berlin. The art direction was by Walter Reimann. It premiered at the Marmorhaus in Berlin.

== Cast ==
- Paul Wegener as Herzog Ferrante
- Hans Sturm as Matteo
- Hugo Döblin as Trivulzio
- Ferdinand Gregori as Guido Colonna
- Lyda Salmonova as Beatrice
- Ernst Deutsch as Orlando
- Adele Sandrock as Dienerin
- Walter Janssen as Antonio
- Wilhelm Diegelmann as Rüstmeister
- Werner Krauskopf as Hauptmann der Leibwache
- Alice Petzinna as Page
- Gustav Roos as Balsamierer
- Fritz Richard as Gremio
- Hellmuth Bergmann as Edelmann
- Albrecht Viktor Blum as
- Hertha von Walther
- Gerhard Bienert

== Bibliography ==
- Waldman, Harry. Missing Reels: Lost Films of American and European Cinema. McFarland, 2000.
