= Helmsman Holk =

1920 film

- Directed by: Rochus Gliese; Ludwig Wolff
- Written by: Thomas Hall; Kurt Küchler (novel)
- Produced by: Paul Ebner; Maxim Galitzenstein
- Starring: Asta Nielsen; Paul Wegener
- Cinematography: Julius Balting
- Production company: Maxim-Film
- Distributed by: UFA
- Release date: 14 November 1920
- Country: Germany
- Languages: Silent; German intertitles

Helmsman Holk (German:Steuermann Holk) is a 1920 German silent drama film directed by Rochus Gliese and Ludwig Wolff and starring Asta Nielsen, Theodor Loos and Paul Wegener.

== Cast ==
In alphabetical order

- Theodor Loos as Jacon Siebensee
- Hans Marr as Steuermann Timm
- Asta Nielsen as Lulu
- Lyda Salmonova
- Charlotte Schultz as Doris, Holms Braut
- Rosa Valetti as Greta Grien
- Paul Wegener as Steuermann Holk

== Bibliography ==
- Jennifer M. Kapczynski & Michael D. Richardson. A New History of German Cinema.
