= Zedlitz (disambiguation) =

Zedlitz or von Zedlitz may refer to:

- Zedlitz, municipality in the district of Greiz, in Thuringia, Germany

== People with the name ==
- Franz von Zedlitz und Leipe (1876–1944), German Freiherr and sport shooter
- George William von Zedlitz (1871–1949), New Zealand professor of modern languages
- Hans von Zedlitz (1890–1948), German film actor
- Joseph Christian Freiherr von Zedlitz (1790–1862), Austrian dramatist and epic poet
- Karl Abraham Zedlitz (1731–1793), Prussian minister of education
