= Rübezahl's Wedding =

1916 film

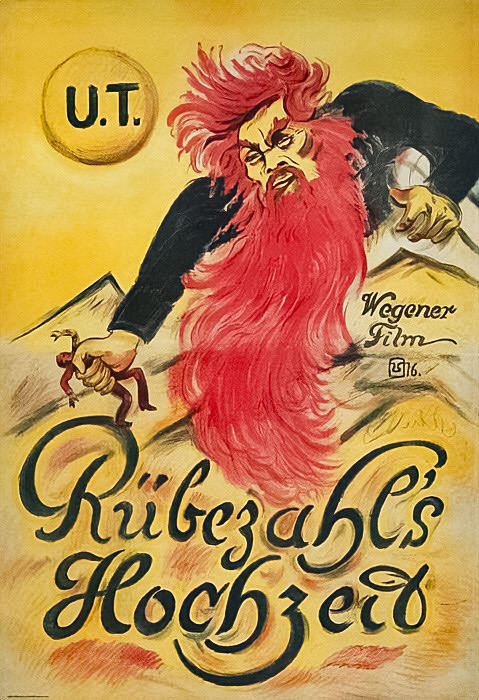
- German: Rübezahls Hochzeit
- Directed by: Paul Wegener; Rochus Gliese
- Written by: Paul Wegener; Rochus Gliese
- Produced by: Paul Davidson
- Starring: Paul Wegener; Lyda Salmonova; Georg Jacoby
- Cinematography: Mads Anton Madsen
- Production company: Wegener-Film
- Distributed by: PAGU
- Release date: 1 October 1916
- Country: Germany
- Languages: Silent; German intertitles

Rübezahl's Wedding (German: Rübezahls Hochzeit) is a 1916 German silent fantasy drama film directed by Rochus Gliese and Paul Wegener and starring Wegener, Lyda Salmonova, and Georg Jacoby. It was the first in a trilogy of fairytale films made by Wegener also including Hans Trutz in the Land of Plenty and The Pied Piper of Hamelin.

It was shot at the Tempelhof Studios in Berlin and on location in a variety of settings, including mountain shots in the Riesengebirge and a farm near Dresden. The film's sets were designed by Gliese.

== Cast ==
In alphabetical order

- Arthur Ehrens as Count
- Rochus Gliese as hairdresser
- Hedwig Gutzeit as Buschgrossmutter
- Georg Jacoby as inspector
- Emilie Kurz as Gouvernante
- Marianne Niemeyer as grandmother
- Lyda Salmonova as Elfe
- Ernst Waldow as tutor
- Paul Wegener as Rübezahl

== See also ==
- Rübezahl
