= Hans Trutz in the Land of Plenty =

1917 film

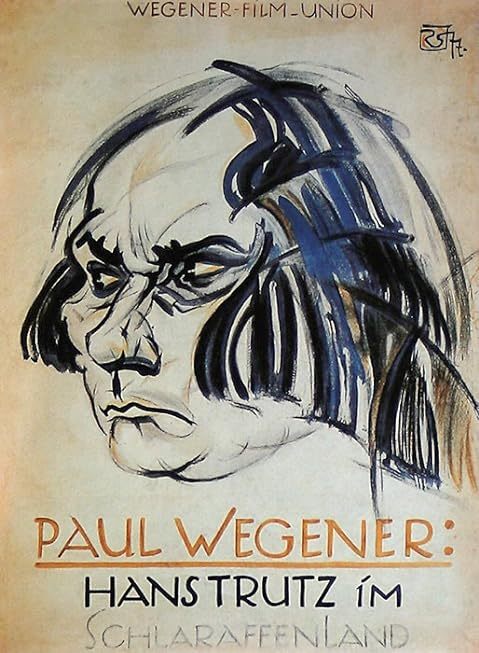
- German film poster
- German: Hans Trutz im Schlaraffenland
- Directed by: Paul Wegener
- Written by: Paul Wegener
- Produced by: Paul Davidson
- Starring: Paul Wegener; Lyda Salmonova; Ernst Lubitsch; Wilhelm Diegelmann
- Cinematography: Frederik Fuglsang
- Production company: PAGU
- Release date: 4 November 1917
- Country: Germany
- Languages: Silent; German intertitles

Hans Trutz in the Land of Plenty (German: Hans Trutz im Schlaraffenland) is a 1917 German silent fantasy film directed by and starring Paul Wegener and also featuring Lyda Salmonova and Ernst Lubitsch. It was one of a trilogy of fairytale-inspired films made by Wegener, along with Rübezahl's Wedding and The Pied Piper of Hamelin.

It was shot at the Tempelhof Studios in Berlin and on location at Bautzen in Saxony. The film's sets were designed by the art director Rochus Gliese.

== Cast ==
- Paul Wegener as Hans Trutz
- Lyda Salmonova as Marthe
- Ernst Lubitsch as Satan
- Wilhelm Diegelmann as Ein Schlaraffe
- Rochus Gliese
- Fritz Rasp
- Gertrude Welcker as Angel

== See also ==
- Cockaigne
