= The Golem and the Dancing Girl =

1917 film

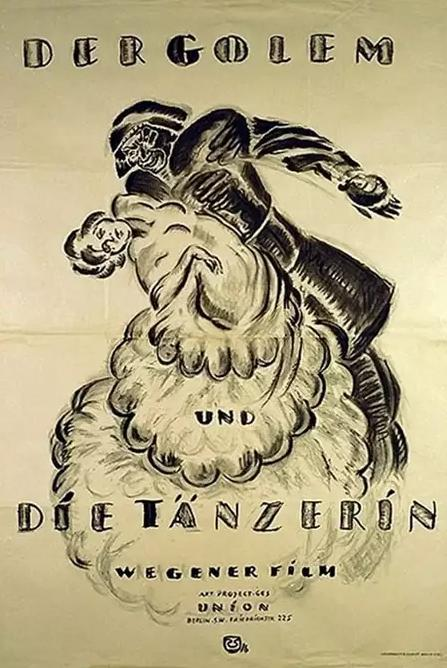
- Theatrical release poster
- Directed by: Rochus Gliese; Paul Wegener
- Written by: Paul Wegener
- Produced by: Paul Davidson; Siegmund Jakob; Hanns Lippmann
- Starring: Paul Wegener; Lyda Salmonova; Rochus Gliese
- Release date: 15 January 1917
- Running time: 12 minutes (reconstruction)
- Country: German Empire
- Language: Silent with German intertitles

The Golem and the Dancing Girl (original German title: Der Golem und die Tänzerin) is a lost 1917 German silent comedy horror film. It is part of a trilogy, preceded by The Golem (1915) and followed by The Golem: How He Came into the World (1920). Paul Wegener and Rochus Gliese co-directed and acted in the film. Wegener also wrote the screenplay. This was the screen debut of Fritz Feld. It was produced by Deutsche Bioscop GmbH.

Troy Howarth wrote, "Not only is the film considered lost, it doesn't seem to have generated much notice upon its original release."

== Plot ==

Not much is known of the plot, since the film is considered lost, but it appears to have been a parody of the earlier 1915 film Der Golem. Wegener plays an actor who, upon discovering the fear his performance generates when he assumes the role of the Golem in a film, decides to wear the costume to a party he is to attend, in order to make an impression on a dancer (Salmanova) who will be there.

== Cast ==
- Paul Wegener as The Golem. IMDb credits Wegener as playing the Golem (as he did in the other two films in the trilogy), while silentera.com states this role was played by Gliese.
- Lyda Salmonova as Helga
- Rochus Gliese
- Wilhelm Diegelmann
- Fritz Feld as Hotel Page (under his birth name Friedrich Veilchenfeld)
- Emilie Kurz
- Mr. Meschugge
- Erich Schönfelder
- Ernst Waldow

== Survival status ==
The Golem and the Dancing Girl is now considered a lost film, though silentera.com reports a print may exist in an "eastern European film archive". Troy Howarth wrote, "(the film) remains one of the earliest filmed examples of a horror spoof....makes it all the more regrettable that it has vanished so completely."

In August 2026, the Munich Film Archive reissued a DVD edition of both 1915 and 1920 versions of The Golem which features a photo reconstruction of the lost film with a music score by Richard Siedhoff.

== See also ==
- List of German films of 1895–1918
- List of lost films
