= The Sunken Bell (disambiguation) =

The Sunken Bell is an 1896 poetic play in blank verse by Gerhart Hauptmann.

The Sunken Bell may also refer to:

- La campana sommersa or The Sunken Bell, a 1927 opera by Ottorino Respighi
- Die versunkene Glocke (opera) or The Sunken Bell, an 1896 opera by Heinrich Zöllner
- The Sunken Bell, an unfinished opera by Carl Ruggles
- The Sunken Bell or Potonuvsky Kolokol, a 1900 opera by Alexei Davidov
