= The Burning Secret (1923 film) =

1923 film

- Directed by: Rochus Gliese
- Written by: Hans Janowitz; Stefan Zweig (novel)
- Starring: Ernst Deutsch; Otto Gebühr; Wilhelm Diegelmann
- Cinematography: Curt Helling
- Production company: Comedia-Film
- Distributed by: Filmhaus Bruckmann
- Release date: 27 September 1923
- Country: Germany
- Languages: Silent; German intertitles

The Burning Secret (German: Das brennende Geheimnis) is a 1923 German silent drama directed by Rochus Gliese and starring Ernst Deutsch, Otto Gebühr, and Wilhelm Diegelmann. It was based on the novel by Stefan Zweig which was later adapted into a 1933 film of the same name

== Cast ==
- Ernst Deutsch
- Otto Gebühr
- Wilhelm Diegelmann
- Olga Belajeff
- Peter Berneis
- Paula Eberty
- Jenny Hasselqvist
- Christian Holm
- Hans Janowitz
- Lotte Stein

== See also ==
- Burning Secret (1988)

== Bibliography ==
- Bock, Hans-Michael; Bergfelder, Tim, eds. (2009). The Concise Cinegraph: Encyclopaedia of German Cinema. New York: Berghahn Books. ISBN 978-1-57181-655-9.
