= The Living Dead (film) =

- Directed by: Rudolf Biebrach
- Written by: Robert Wiene
- Starring: Henny Porten; Paul Bildt; Elsa Wagner
- Cinematography: Willy Gaebel
- Music by: Giuseppe Becce
- Production company: Messter Film
- Distributed by: UFA
- Release date: 29 August 1919
- Country: Germany
- Languages: Silent; German intertitles

The Living Dead (German: Die lebende Tote) is a 1919 German silent film directed by Rudolf Biebrach and starring Henny Porten, Paul Bildt and Elsa Wagner.

The film's sets were designed by the art director Kurt Dürnhöfer and Jack Winter.

== Cast ==
- Henny Porten as Eva von Redlich
- Paul Bildt as Professor von Redlich
- Elsa Wagner as Brigitte
- Ernst Dernburg as Von der Tann
- Carl Ebert
- Hans von Zedlitz as Graf Karl Lanza

== Bibliography ==
- Bock, Hans-Michael & Bergfelder, Tim. The Concise CineGraph. Encyclopedia of German Cinema. Berghahn Books, 2009.
