= Comrades (1921 film) =

1921 film

- Directed by: Curt Courant
- Written by: Ernst Matray
- Produced by: Ernst Matray
- Starring: Elsa Wagner
- Production company: Mátray-Film
- Release date: 1921
- Country: Germany
- Languages: Silent; German intertitles

Comrades (German: Kameraden) is a 1921 German silent film directed by Curt Courant and starring Elsa Wagner, Max Gülstorff and Ernst Matray.

== Cast ==
- Elsa Wagner as Gröfin Bolz
- Max Gülstorff as Sohn
- Ernst Matray as Diener
- Stefan Vacano as Milford
- Katta Sterna as Tochter Mary

== Bibliography ==
- Hans-Michael Bock and Tim Bergfelder. The Concise Cinegraph: An Encyclopedia of German Cinema. Berghahn Books.
