= The Found Bride =

1925 film

- Directed by: Rochus Gliese
- Written by: Heinrich Brandt
- Produced by: Erich Pommer
- Starring: Xenia Desni; André Mattoni; Jenny Jugo; Lydia Potechina
- Cinematography: Günther Rittau
- Production company: UFA
- Distributed by: UFA
- Release date: 28 April 1925
- Country: Germany
- Languages: Silent; German intertitles

The Found Bride (Germany: Die gefundene Braut) is a 1925 German silent comedy film directed by Rochus Gliese and starring Xenia Desni, André Mattoni and Jenny Jugo. It premiered on 28 April 1925 at the Tauentzienpalast in Berlin.

== Cast ==
- Xenia Desni as Lucy
- André Mattoni as Harry
- Jenny Jugo as Gussy
- Lydia Potechina as Runde tante
- Alexander Murski as Gussys Onkel
- Emilie Kurz as Spitze Tante
- Cali Kaiser-Lin as Harrys Diener Chang
- Karl Brose as Faktotum Tom
- Walter Werner as Wirt
- Neumann-Schüler as Gendarm
- Elsa Wagner as Frau Thompson

== Bibliography ==
- Hardt, Ursula. From Caligari to California: Erich Pommer's life in the International Film Wars. Berghahn Books, 1996.
- Kreimeier, Klaus. The Ufa Story: A History of Germany's Greatest Film Company, 1918-1945. University of California Press, 1999.
