= The Foreign Prince =

1918 film

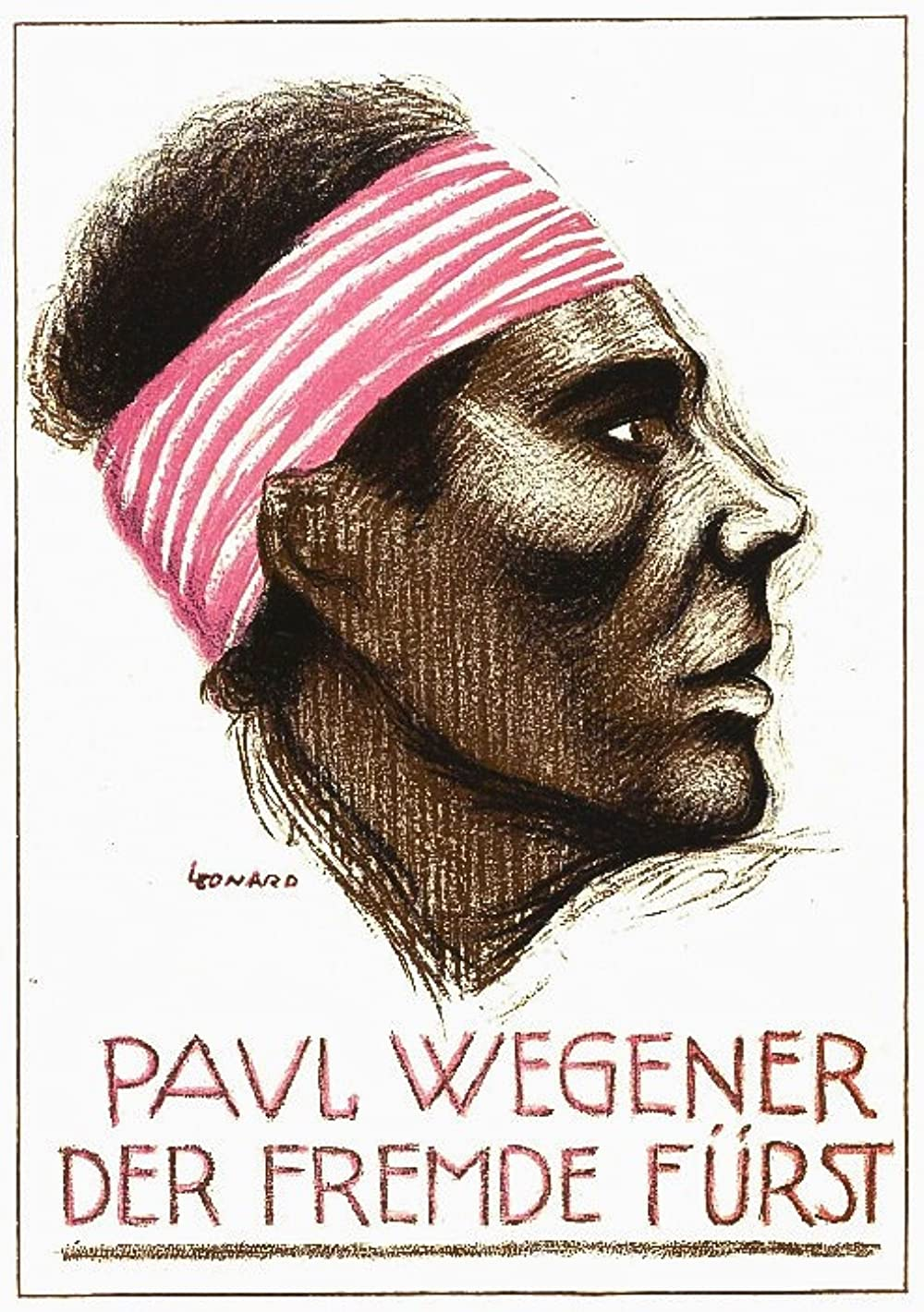
- German: Der fremde Fürst
- Directed by: Paul Wegener
- Written by: Paul Wegener
- Produced by: Paul Davidson
- Starring: Paul Wegener; Lyda Salmonova; Wilhelm Diegelmann
- Cinematography: Frederik Fuglsang
- Production company: PAGU
- Distributed by: UFA
- Release date: November 1918
- Running time: 75 minutes
- Country: Germany
- Languages: Silent; German intertitles

The Foreign Prince (German: Der fremde Fürst) is a 1918 German silent drama film directed by and starring Paul Wegener and also featuring Lyda Salmonova and Margarete Kupfer. It is now considered to be a lost film.

It was shot at the Tempelhof Studios in Berlin. The film's sets were designed by the art director Rochus Gliese.

Prior to its release, the film was censored for pornographic images in September 1918 as well as on 21 May 1921.

== Cast ==
- Paul Wegener as Hidde Yori, Son and heir of the island lord Prince Aswan
- Lyda Salmonova as Eva, Brodersen's daughter
- Gustav Botz as Brodersen, merchant
- Rochus Gliese as Düssing, Evas Vetter, volunteer at Fa. Brodersen & Co.
- Margarete Kupfer as Frau Höhne, Zimmervermieterin
- Adolf E. Licho as variety director
- Walter Norbert as Brodersen's servant
- Paul Passarge as lawyer of Fa. Brodersen & Co.
- Hans Sturm as Schmitz, head of an overseas branch
- Franz Verdier as Ein Kontorherr
- Elsa Wagner
