= She and the Three (1935 film) =

- Directed by: Victor Janson
- Written by: Walter Wassermann
- Starring: Gustav Waldau; Charlotte Susa; Hubert von Meyerinck
- Cinematography: Willy Winterstein
- Music by: Ernst Leenen
- Production companies: Schulz & Wuellner Filmfabrikation
- Distributed by: Lux-Film (Austria)
- Release date: 18 January 1935
- Country: Germany
- Language: German

She and the Three (German: Sie und die Drei) is a 1935 German comedy crime film directed by Victor Janson and starring Gustav Waldau, Charlotte Susa and Hubert von Meyerinck.

The film's sets were designed by the art directors Wilhelm Depenau and Erich Zander. It was partly shot on location in Hamburg.

== Cast ==
- Gustav Waldau as Dr. Bittner
- Charlotte Susa as Lisa, seine Tochter
- Hubert von Meyerinck as André Nicol
- Walter Steinbeck as Alexander Bobinsky
- Hans Söhnker as Rudolf Rostorff, Zimmerkellner
- Harald Paulsen as Peter Hüsing, Friseur
- Kurt Vespermann as Toni Kemser, Chauffeur
- Hilde Krüger as Christine Glöckner, Zimmermädchen
- Antonie Jaeckel as Marie, eine alte Hotelbedienstete
- Otto Stoeckel as Maranu
- Rudolf Essek as Der Geschäftsführer der Hotelbar
- Hans von Zedlitz as Der Hoteldirektor

== Bibliography ==
- Bock, Hans-Michael & Bergfelder, Tim. The Concise Cinegraph: Encyclopaedia of German Cinema. Berghahn Books, 2009.
