= Frederik Fuglsang =

Danish cinematographer

- Born: 12 December 1887; Denmark
- Died: 2 April 1953 (aged 65)
- Occupation: Cinematographer
- Years active: 1915–1938

Frederik Fuglsang (1887–1953) was a Danish cinematographer who worked largely in the German film industry. Fuglsang was employed by Nordisk Film, who initially brought him to Germany. He worked frequently during the Weimar era on films such as Vanina (1922) and Frederic Zelnik's The Weavers (1927). He was married to the actress Käte Fuglsang.

== Selected filmography ==
- En slem Dreng (1915)
- Hans Trutz in the Land of Plenty (1917)
- The Pied Piper of Hamelin (1918)
- The Foreign Prince (1918)
- The Man of Action (1919)
- The Swabian Maiden (1919)
- Out of the Depths (1919)
- The Galley Slave (1919)
- Indian Revenge (1920)
- The Love of a Thief (1920)
- Mascotte (1920)
- Peter Voss, Thief of Millions (1921)
- Lucrezia Borgia (1922)
- His Excellency from Madagascar (1922)
- The Stream (1922)
- Vanina (1922)
- Nora (1923)
- The Evangelist (1924)
- Women You Rarely Greet (1925)
- Old Mamsell's Secret (1925)
- Letters Which Never Reached Him (1925)
- The Blue Danube (1926)
- The Mill at Sanssouci (1926)
- Fadette (1926)
- The Violet Eater (1926)
- The Bank Crash of Unter den Linden (1926)
- The Bohemian Dancer (1926)
- The Weavers (1927)
- The Gypsy Baron (1927)
- Dancing Vienna (1927)
- The Gypsy Baron (1927)
- The Saint and Her Fool (1928)
- Der Ladenprinz (1928)
- Der Herzensphotograph (1928)
- Inherited Passions (1929)
- My Heart is a Jazz Band (1929)
- Peter the Mariner (1929)
- The Crimson Circle (1929)
- My Sister and I (1929)
- Der Hund von Baskerville (1929)
- Morals at Midnight (1930)
- The Corvette Captain (1930)
- You'll Be in My Heart (1930)
- It Happens Every Day (1930)
- Shooting Festival in Schilda (1931)
- Gloria (1931)
- Grock (1931)
- Elisabeth of Austria (1931)
- The Fate of Renate Langen (1931)
- Night Convoy (1932)

== Bibliography ==
- Eisner, Lotte H. The Haunted Screen: Expressionism in the German Cinema and the Influence of Max Reinhardt. University of California Press, 1969.
