= The Galley Slave (1919 film) =

1919 film

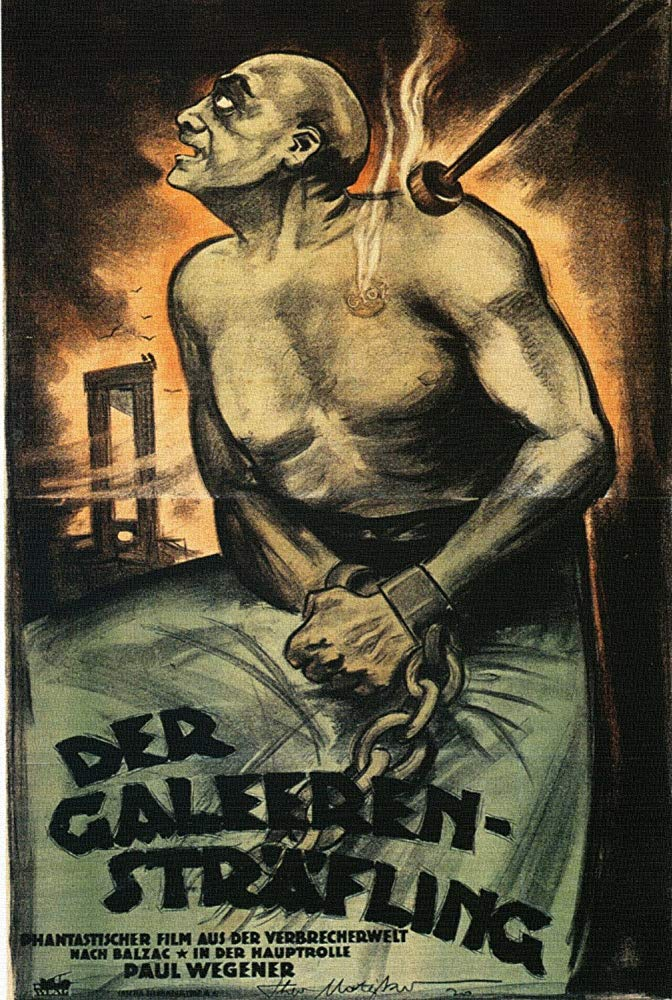
- Directed by: Paul Wegener; Rochus Gliese
- Written by: Honoré de Balzac (novels); Paul Wegener
- Produced by: Paul Davidson
- Starring: Paul Wegener; Lyda Salmonova; Paul Hartmann
- Cinematography: Frederik Fuglsang; Fritz Arno Wagner
- Production company: PAGU
- Distributed by: UFA
- Release date: 17 October 1919
- Country: Germany
- Languages: Silent; German intertitles

The Galley Slave (German: Der Galeerensträfling) is a 1919 German silent historical adventure film directed by Rochus Gliese and Paul Wegener and starring Wegener, Lyda Salmonova, and Paul Hartmann. Inspired by several of the novels of Honoré de Balzac including Lost Illusions, it was released in two parts on separate dates during October 1919. Although Gliese was the principal credited director, the film's star Wegener also worked on its production.

It was shot at the Templehof Studios in Berlin, with sets designed by the art director Kurt Richter.

== Cast ==
- Paul Wegener as Colin, König der Galeerensträflinge
- Lyda Salmonova as Victorine
- Paul Hartmann as Rastignac
- Ernst Deutsch as Galeerensträfling
- Else Berna as Herzogin Maufrigneuse
- Adele Sandrock
- Lothar Müthel
- Jakob Tiedtke
- Armin Schweizer
- Hedwig Gutzeit

== Bibliography ==
- Paul Matthew St. Pierre. Cinematography in the Weimar Republic: Lola Lola, Dirty Singles, and the Men Who Shot Them. Rowman & Littlefield, 2016.
