= Nora (1923 film) =

1923 film

- Directed by: Berthold Viertel
- Written by: Henrik Ibsen (play); George Froeschel; Berthold Viertel
- Starring: Olga Chekhova; Carl Ebert; Fritz Kortner; Anton Edthofer
- Cinematography: Frederik Fuglsang
- Production company: PAGU
- Distributed by: UFA
- Release date: 2 February 1923
- Running time: 85 minutes
- Country: Germany
- Languages: Silent; German intertitles

Nora is a 1923 German silent drama film directed by Berthold Viertel and starring Olga Chekhova, Carl Ebert and Fritz Kortner. It is an adaptation of the 1879 play A Doll's House by Henrik Ibsen. It premiered in Berlin on 2 February 1923. The film's art direction was by Walter Reimann.

== Cast ==
- Olga Chekhova as Nora Helmer
- Carl Ebert as Torwald Helmer, Nora's husband
- Fritz Kortner as Krogstadt, lawyer
- Anton Edthofer as Dr Rank
- Helga Thomas as Krogstadt's daughter
- Paul Günther as Krogstadt's son
- Lucie Höflich as Frau Linden
- Ilka Grüning as Marianne, Nora's former nanny

== Bibliography ==
- Grange, William. Cultural Chronicle of the Weimar Republic. Scarecrow Press, 2008.
