= Monks, Girls and Hungarian Soldiers =

1952 film

- Directed by: Ferdinand Dörfler
- Written by: Hans Fitz
- Produced by: Ferdinand Dörfler
- Starring: Joe Stöckel; Paul Hartmann; Rudolf Fernau
- Cinematography: Georg Krause
- Edited by: Walter Boos
- Music by: Emil Ferstl
- Production company: Dörfler-Filmproduktion
- Distributed by: Allianz Filmverleih
- Release date: 2 October 1952
- Running time: 88 minutes
- Country: West Germany
- Language: German

Monks, Girls and Hungarian Soldiers (German: Mönche, Mädchen und Panduren) is a 1952 West German historical adventure comedy film directed by Ferdinand Dörfler and starring Joe Stöckel, Paul Hartmann and Rudolf Fernau. It was made at the Bavaria Studios in Munich. The film's sets were designed by Ludwig Reiber. Some shooting was also done at Nymphenburg Palace.

== Cast ==
- Joe Stöckel as Barnabas, Laienbruder-Braumeister des Klosters
- Paul Hartmann as Kurfürst von Bayern
- Rudolf Fernau as Megerle, kurfürstlicher Geheimsekretarius
- Petra Peters as Gustl
- Hans Reiser as Johannes, Laienbruder-Novize
- Marianne Schönauer as Prinzessin Adelgunde
- Lucie Englisch as Rosalinde von Klettenheim
- Jaspar von Oertzen as Michael von Walden
- Albert Hehn as Erzherzog Anton von Österreich
- Rudolf Vogel as Stops, Hofnarr
- Beppo Brem as Korbinian, Paulaner-Mönch
- Gustav Waldau as Ignatius, Paulaner-Mönch
- Erich Ponto as Fellerer, Goldschmied
- Hans Carl Mueller as Prior des Paulaner-Klosters
- Otto Brüggemann as Laurentius, Paulaner-Mönch
- Franz Loskarn as Urban, Paulaner-Mönch
- Karl-Heinz Peters as Schufterle, Schreiber
- Wolf Harro as Polizei-Offizier
- Otto Schmidt-Bertsch as Polizei-Offizier
- Hans Stadtmüller as Baptist, Paulaner-Mönch

== See also ==
- Nockherberg

== Bibliography ==
- Klossner, Michael (2002). The Europe of 1500–1815 on Film and Television. Jefferson, NC: McFarland & Co. ISBN 978-0-7864-1223-5.
