= Malaria (1919 film) =

- Directed by: Rochus Gliese
- Written by: Hans Brennert; Friedel Köhne
- Starring: Lyda Salmonova
- Cinematography: Friedrich Weinmann
- Production company: Flora-Film
- Release date: September 1919
- Country: Germany
- Languages: Silent; German intertitles

Malaria is a 1919 German silent film directed by Rochus Gliese and starring Lyda Salmonova, Emil Kühne, and Ewald Bach.

== Cast ==
- Lyda Salmonova as Solotänzerin Tatjana Sergeijowna
- Emil Kühne as Pope Sergej
- Ewald Bach as Dr. Fjodr Gawrilowitsch Schuwalow
- Martin Lübbert as Dr. Boris Michailowitsch Nawaschin
- Adele Sandrock as Tatjanas Amme Anuschka
- Raoul Lange as Fürst Dimitrij
- Friedrich Kühne as
- Ernst Waldow as Laboratoriumsdiener Wassjka
- Eddie Seefeld
- Ballett Charell

== Bibliography ==
- Thomas Elsaesser & Michael Wedel. The BFI companion to German cinema. British Film Institute, 1999.
