= Lotte Stein =

German actress (1894–1982)

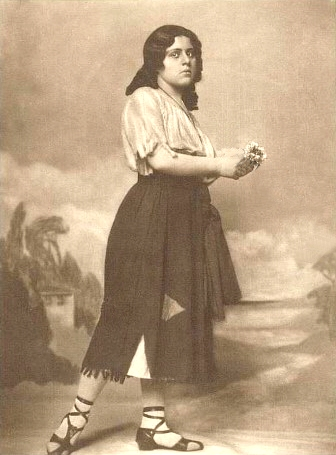
- Born: Lotte Philippstein; January 12, 1894; Berlin, German Empire
- Died: September 20, 1982 (aged 88); Munich, West Germany
- Other names: Lotte Kopf
- Occupation: Actress
- Years active: 1927-1988

Lotte Stein (January 12, 1894–September 20, 1982) was a German actress of the stage and screen. Of Jewish descent, she fled to the United States via Czechoslovakia and Portugal, and arrived at the Port of New York on board the SS Mouzinho in June 1941.

== Selected filmography ==
- The Closed Chain (1920)
- The Princess of the Nile (1920)
- The Curse of Silence (1922)
- Man by the Wayside (1923)
- The Burning Secret (1923)
- Father Voss (1925)
- Hussar Fever (1925)
- Doña Juana (1927)
- Leontine's Husbands (1928)
- Only a Viennese Woman Kisses Like That (1928)
- Don Juan in a Girls' School (1928)
- The Green Alley (1928)
- Guilty (1928)
- A Mother's Love (1929)
- The Copper (1930)
- Next, Please! (1930)
- Susanne Cleans Up (1930)
- Witnesses Wanted (1930)
- Police Spy 77 (1930)
- Of Life and Death (1930)
- Three Days of Love (1931)
- When the Soldiers (1931)
- Errant Husbands (1931)
- Queen of the Night (1931)
- Mary (1931)
- The First Right of the Child (1932)
- The Burning Secret (1933)
- Scandal in Budapest (1933)
- A City Upside Down (1933)
- The Climax (1944)
- Swing Out the Blues (1944)
- Captain Eddie (1945)
- Mother Wore Tights (1947)
- The Creeper (1948)
- I'll Make You Happy (1949)
- The White Tower (1950)
- The Midnight Venus (1951)
- All I Desire (1953)
- The Band Wagon (1953)
- The Night Without Morals (1953)
- And That on Monday Morning (1959)

== Bibliography ==
- Jung, Uli & Schatzberg, Walter. Beyond Caligari: The Films of Robert Wiene. Berghahn Books, 1999.
