= Dancer of Death =

1920 film

- Directed by: Siegfried Philippi
- Written by: Siegfried Philippi
- Starring: Reinhold Schünzel; Hans Adalbert Schlettow
- Cinematography: Heinrich Gärtner
- Production company: Turma-Film
- Release date: 23 January 1920
- Country: Germany
- Languages: Silent; German intertitles

Dancer of Death (German: Tänzerin Tod) is a 1920 German silent film directed by Siegfried Philippi and starring Reinhold Schünzel and Hans Adalbert Schlettow.

The film's sets were designed by the art director Edmund Heuberger.

== Cast ==
- Hans Adalbert Schlettow
- Reinhold Schünzel
- Emmy Wyda
- Herbert Kiper
- Rudolf Klein-Rhoden
- Hanna Lierke
- Lissi Lind
- Viktor Senger
- Hans von Zedlitz
- Johanna Zimmermann

== Bibliography ==
- Bock, Hans-Michael & Bergfelder, Tim. The Concise CineGraph. Encyclopedia of German Cinema. Berghahn Books, 2009.
