= The Golem: How He Came into the World =

1920 German film

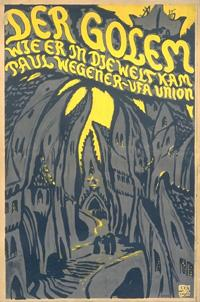
- Theatrical release poster
- Directed by: Paul Wegener; Carl Boese
- Written by: Henrik Galeen; Paul Wegener
- Based on: The Golem by Gustav Meyrink
- Produced by: Paul Davidson
- Starring: Paul Wegener; Albert Steinrück; Lyda Salmonova; Ernst Deutsch; Lothar Müthel
- Cinematography: Karl Freund; Guido Seeber
- Music by: Hans Landsberger
- Production company: PAGU
- Distributed by: Universum Film (UFA) (1920) (Germany) (theatrical); Paramount Pictures (1921) (USA) (theatrical)
- Release date: 29 October 1920
- Running time: 86 minutes
- Country: Weimar Republic
- Language: Silent film with German intertitles

The Golem: How He Came into the World (German: Der Golem, wie er in die Welt kam, also referred to as Der Golem) is a 1920 (Note: The film was released separately in 1921 in the United States, leading some sources to note the film as having released in 1921, referring to the English version.) German silent horror film and a leading example of early German Expressionism. Director Paul Wegener, who co-directed the film with Carl Boese and co-wrote the script with Henrik Galeen based on Gustav Meyrink's 1915 novel, stars as the titular creature, a being in Jewish folklore created from clay. Cinematographer Karl Freund went on to work on the 1930s Universal Pictures horror films years later in Hollywood.

The Golem: How He Came into the World is the third of three films that Wegener made featuring the golem, the other two being The Golem (1915) and the short comedy The Golem and the Dancing Girl (1917), in which Wegener dons the golem make-up in order to frighten a young lady with whom he is infatuated. The Golem: How He Came into the World is a prequel to The Golem from 1915 and, as the only one of the three films that has not been lost, is the best known of the series.

== Plot ==
The German version of The Golem: How He Came into the World (1920)

Set in the Jewish ghetto of medieval Prague, the film begins with Rabbi Loew, the head of the city's Jewish community, reading the stars. Loew predicts disaster for his people and informs the elders of the community. The next day the Holy Roman Emperor signs a decree declaring that the Jews must leave the city before the new moon and sends the squire Florian to deliver the decree. Loew, meanwhile, begins to devise a way of defending the Jews.

Upon arriving at the ghetto, the arrogant Florian is attracted to Miriam, Loew's daughter, for whom his assistant also feels affection. Loew talks Florian into reminding the Emperor that he has predicted disasters and told the Emperor's horoscopes, and requests an audience with him. Having flirted with Miriam, Florian leaves. Loew begins to create the Golem, a huge being made of clay which he will bring to life to defend his people. Florian returns later with a request from the Emperor for Loew to attend the Rose Festival at the palace. He shares a romantic moment with Miriam while Loew reveals to his assistant that he has secretly created the Golem and requires his assistance to animate it. In an elaborate magical procedure, Loew and the assistant summon the spirit Astaroth and compel him, as per the ancient texts, to say the magic word that will bring life. This word is written on paper by Loew which is then enclosed in an amulet and inserted onto the Golem's chest. The Golem awakes, and the Rabbi initially uses it as a household servant.

When Loew is summoned to the palace for the festival, he brings the Golem with him to impress the audience. Florian, meanwhile, slips away from the court to meet Miriam, whose house is being guarded by Loew's assistant. Back at the palace, the court is both terrified and intrigued by the arrival of the Golem. Impressed, the Emperor asks to see more supernatural feats. Loew projects a magical screen showing the history of the Jews, instructing his audience not to laugh or even speak. Upon the arrival of Ahasuerus, the Wandering Jew, the court begins to laugh and the palace suddenly begins to crumble. At Loew's order, the Golem intervenes and props up the falling ceiling, saving the court. In gratitude, the Emperor pardons the Jews and allows them to stay.

Loew and the Golem return to the ghetto, spreading the news that the Jews are saved. Loew returns to his house and begins to notice erratic behaviour in the Golem. After managing to remove the amulet, he reads that upcoming astrological movements will cause Astaroth to possess the Golem and attack its creators. Loew is called down by his assistant to join in the celebrations in the street. As the community rejoices, the assistant goes to inform Miriam but finds her in bed with Florian. Devastated, he reanimates the Golem and orders it to remove Florian from the building, but the Golem, now under Astaroth's influence, outright throws Florian from the house's roof, killing him. Horrified, the assistant and Miriam flee, but the Golem sets fire to the building, and Miriam falls unconscious.

Loew's assistant rushes to the synagogue to alert the praying Jews of the disaster, but upon their arrival at Loew's house, they find that it is burning, and both the Golem and Miriam are missing. In despair, the community begs Loew to save them from the rampaging Golem. Loew performs a spell that removes Astaroth from the Golem. Promptly, the Golem, who is wandering the ghetto causing destruction, leaves Miriam (whom he has been dragging by the hair through the streets) lying on a stone surface and heads towards the ghetto gate. He breaks the gate open and sees a group of little girls playing. They all flee except for one, whom he picks up, having now a docile nature. Out of curiosity, she removes the amulet from the Golem; it drops her and collapses, unconscious. Loew finds Miriam, who awakens shortly after. Happily reunited, they are awkwardly joined by Loew's assistant, who informs him that the Jews are waiting for him by the gate. After Loew has left, the assistant promises Miriam that he will never tell anyone of her forbidden affair with Florian and asks for forgiveness for his actions in return. The Jews meanwhile gather at the gate to find the dead Golem. Rejoicing and praying, they carry it back into the ghetto, the Star of David appearing on the screen as the film ends.

== Cast ==
- Albert Steinrück as Rabbi Loew
- Paul Wegener as The Golem
- Lyda Salmonova as Miriam
- Ernst Deutsch as Loew's assistant
- Lothar Müthel as Squire Florian
- Otto Gebühr as Emperor
- Hans Sturm as Rabbi Jehuda
- Max Kronert as The Gatekeeper
- Greta Schröder as A Lady of the Court
- Loni Nest as Little Girl
- Fritz Feld as A Jester

== Production ==
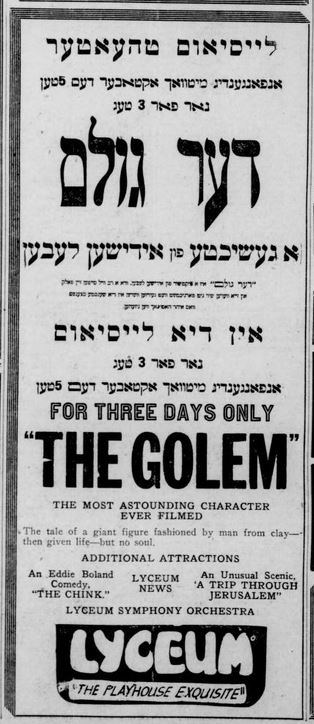
1921 American newspaper ad in Yiddish and English

Wegener had been unhappy with his 1915 attempt at telling the story, due to compromises he had to make during its production. His 1920 attempt was meant to more directly convey the legend as he heard it told in Prague while he was filming The Student of Prague (1913).

In 1919, Wegener announced plans for Alraune und der Golem, uniting the two folklore characters in one film. Though posters and other publicity material survive, it was almost certainly never made. Instead, Wegener produced his 1920 film, but later starred as Professor Jakob ten Brinken in the 1928 version of Alraune.

It was shot at the Tempelhof Studios in Berlin. Architect and designer Hans Poelzig created the film's scenery as a highly stylised interpretation of the medieval Jewish ghetto of Prague.

== Release and reception ==
In Germany, the film received a stellar reception. According to Spiro, the film "sold out the Berlin Premiere at Ufa-Palast am Zoo on October 29, 1920, and played to full theaters for two months straight."

The film first released in the United States to packed houses in New York City in 1921 at the Criterion Theater. It was the longest-running movie in the same theatre that year, having run for 16 consecutive weeks in the theatre. Despite the hot summer, the film screened to full theaters on a daily basis, multiple times a day. Its release started a so-called "golem cult" of golem-related media and adaptations.

== Preservation and home video status ==
The Golem is in the public domain and over the years has been released many times in poor quality, unrestored black and white versions. It is the only movie in the Golem trilogy that survived World War II.

The film was first restored in 1977 in Germany and scored by Karl-Ernst Sasse. This version is not readily available on home video.

In 2000, a second restoration was carried out by the Cineteca del Comune di Bologna at the laboratories of L'Immagine Ritrovata in Italy and licensed by Transit Film. This version is based on an export print transferred at 20 frames per second (85 minutes) and with its original tinting intact. It was given an ensemble score by Aljoscha Zimmermann and released on DVD in Germany (Universum Film, 2004), the UK (Eureka, 2003), France (mk2, 2006), Spain (Divisa, 2003) and the US (Kino Lorber, 2002).

A third, fully digital restoration, this time based on the original domestic negative, was completed by the Friedrich Wilhelm Murnau Foundation in 2017 and is available on DCP. It was given three unique scores and released on Blu-ray and DVD in Germany (Universum Film, 2019), the UK (Masters of Cinema, 2019) and the US (Kino Lorber, 2020).

The film was first accompanied at release by a score from German Jewish composer Hans Landsberger. This original score was considered lost for decades, until it was rediscovered in 2018. It was reconstructed and orchestrated, and the reconstruction premiered in Weimar in September 2020.

== Critical response ==
Critical reception for The Golem upon its initial release was positive. The New York Times' 1921 review praised its "exceptional acting" and "expressive settings", the latter of which was compared to those of another early German expressionist horror film, Robert Wiene's The Cabinet of Dr. Caligari (1920).

Film critic Leonard Maltin gave the film 3 1/2 out of a possible 4 stars, calling it a "chilling, visually dazzling story of the supernatural, based on a famous Jewish folktale of the 16th century" and a "classic of German Expressionist cinema". Maltin also noted the film as a forerunner to the 1931 film adaption of Frankenstein. British critic Leslie Halliwell gave it three of four stars: "There were several versions of this story ... but this is almost certainly the best, its splendid sets, performances and certain scenes all being clearly influential on later Hollywood films, especially Frankenstein." Dennis Schwartz from Ozus's World Movie Reviews rated the film a grade B+, praising the film's "powerful visuals". In his review of the film, Schwartz wrote, "a landmark of early German expressionism. It is through the striking black-and-white German expressionism photography of Karl Freund that the film displayed its unusual feel for the macabre and might be considered a precursor to the Frankenstein horror films and how horror films were to be made from now on".

== Legacy ==
In the following years since The Golem's release and rediscovery, it has been considered an early classic in horror cinema, and one of the first films to introduce the concept of the "man-made monster". Film review aggregator Rotten Tomatoes reported an approval rating of 100%, based on 31 reviews, with a rating average of 8.0/10. In a list of the 100 most important German films, compiled in 1994 by the Association of German Cinémathèques, The Golem was placed at #16. The film is listed in 101 Horror Movies You Must See Before You Die, a spin-off of 1001 Films You Must See Before You Die, which the authors called "a classic of German expressionist cinema". It was presented at the Star and Shadow cinema in 2014 as part of the British Film Institute's Gothic season. This screening featured a new unique live soundtrack which was the result of a collaboration between Noize Choir and Wax Magnetic. The Castle, Newcastle screened the film in 2016, again with a live soundtrack from Noize Choir, this time accompanied by artists Mariam Rezaei and Adam Denton from the Old Police House.

== See also ==
- List of films made in Weimar Germany
- List of films with a 100% rating on Rotten Tomatoes
