= The Golem (1915 film) =

1915 film

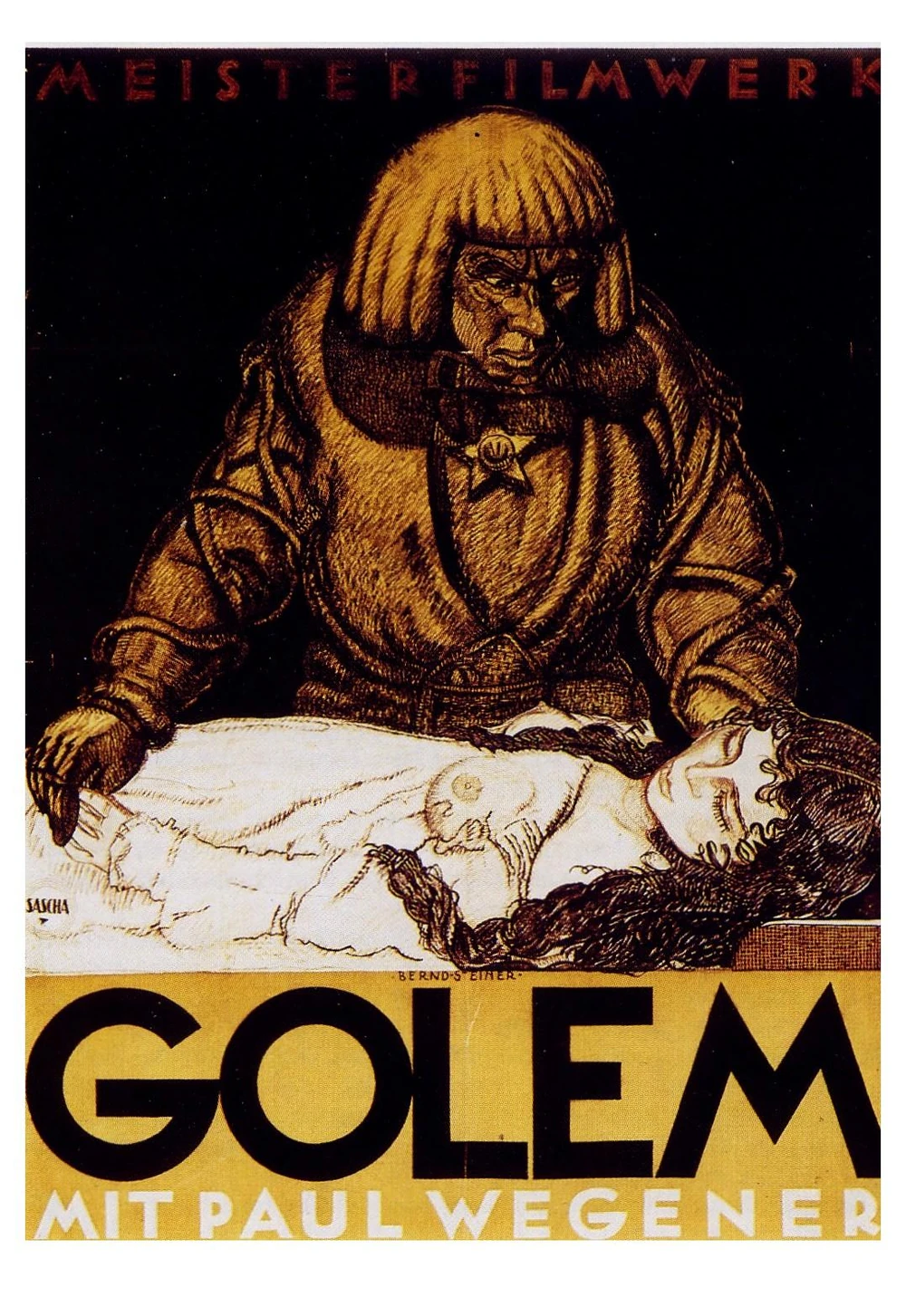
- Theatrical release poster
- Directed by: Paul Wegener; Henrik Galeen
- Written by: Paul Wegener; Henrik Galeen
- Produced by: Hanns Lippmann
- Starring: Paul Wegener; Rudolf Blümner; Carl Ebert; Henrik Galeen; Lyda Salmonova
- Cinematography: Guido Seeber
- Production company: Deutsche Bioscop
- Release date: 15 January 1915
- Running time: 60 minutes
- Country: German Empire
- Languages: Silent; German intertitles

Der Golem (German: Der Golem, shown in the US as The Monster of Fate) is a partially lost 1915 German silent horror film written and directed by Paul Wegener and Henrik Galeen. It was inspired by a Jewish folktale, the most prevalent version of the story involving 16th century Rabbi Judah Loew ben Bezalel who created the Golem to protect his people from antisemites. Wegener claimed the film was based on Gustav Meyrink's 1915 novel The Golem, but, as the movie has little to do with existing Jewish traditions, Troy Howarth states "it is more likely that (the screenwriters) simply drew upon European folklore".

The film was the first of a trilogy produced by Wegener, followed by The Golem and the Dancing Girl (1917) and The Golem: How He Came into the World (1920).

== Plot ==
In modern times, an antiques dealer (Henrik Galeen) searching the ruins of a Jewish temple, finds a golem (Paul Wegener), a clay statue that had been brought to life four centuries earlier by a Kabbalist rabbi using a magical amulet to protect the Jewish people from persecution. The dealer resurrects the golem as a servant, but the golem falls in love with Jessica (Lyda Salmonova), the dealer's daughter. When she does not return his love, the golem goes on a rampage and commits a series of murders.

== Cast ==
Paul Wegener (Golem) and Lyda Salmonova (Jessica)

- Paul Wegener as Golem
- Rudolf Blümner as Gelehrter
- Carl Ebert as Troedler
- Henrik Galeen as Troedler, the antiques dealer
- Lyda Salmonova as Jessica
- Robert A. Dietrich
- Jakob Tiedtke

== Production ==
Co-writer/co-director Henrik Galeen played a major role in the film (which was unusual for him) and years later went on to co-create other silent horror classics, such as F. W. Murnau's Nosferatu (1922) and Paul Leni's Waxworks (1924)

Actress Lyda Salmanova went on to marry Paul Wegener.

The few surviving clips from this film show Wegener in a costume almost identical to the one he used in his later 1920 version, and "show him stumbling around in a manner he would repeat in the later film", according to Troy Howarth.

== Preservation status ==
Surviving excerpts from The Golem

The Deutsche Kinemathek film archive possesses "108 meter fragments". While many sources consider it a lost film, silentera.com states that a "print exists", and Professor Elizabeth Baer notes in her book The Golem Redux: From Prague to Post-Holocaust Fiction that Donald Glut claimed in The Frankenstein Legend that "European film collector" Paul Sauerlaender tracked down "a complete print" in 1958; Baer is careful, however, to point out that "Glut provides no source for this information."

In 2017, a 24-minute restored version of the film by the Munich Film Archive was shown at the Pordenone Silent Film Festival. The reconstuction features the second reel of the American version, released as Monster of Fate, sourced from a 16 mm film found by Fernando Martín Peña at the Museo del Cine Pablo Ducrós Hicken. It was reissued on DVD in August 2026 alongside both sequels and a music score by violinist Sabrina Zimmermann and pianist Mark Pogolski.

== See also ==
- List of German films of 1895–1918
- List of incomplete or partially lost films
