= The Night Without Morals =

1953 film

- Directed by: Ferdinand Dörfler
- Written by: Erich Engels; Wolf Neumeister
- Produced by: Ferdinand Dörfler
- Starring: Claude Farell; Gustav Knuth; Lucie Englisch
- Cinematography: Georg Krause
- Edited by: Hilde Grebner
- Music by: Emil Ferstl
- Production company: Dörfler-Filmproduktion
- Distributed by: J. Arthur Rank Film
- Release date: 2 October 1953
- Running time: 87 minutes
- Country: West Germany
- Language: German

The Night Without Morals (German: Die Nacht ohne Moral) is a 1953 West German comedy film directed by Ferdinand Dörfler and starring Claude Farell, Gustav Knuth and Lucie Englisch. It was shot at the Bavaria Studios in Munich. The film's sets were designed by the art directors Willi Horn and Ludwig Reiber.

== Main cast ==
- Claude Farell as Isabella
- Gustav Knuth as Abruzzo
- Lucie Englisch as Babette, Köchin
- Karl Schönböck as Philipp Weinsberg, Rittmeister
- Lotte Stein as Gräfin Lydia Rutschenka
- Beppo Brem as Tarta, Unterhauptmann der Räuber
- Elisabeth Flickenschildt as Martha, Abruzzos verlassene Frau
- Hanna Hutten as Gunda, Stubenmädchen
- Franz Muxeneder as Sigi, ein Räuber
- Gustav Waldau as Jacques, Kammerdiener

== Secondary cast ==
- Blake Krëager as SS Officer

== Bibliography ==
- Bock, Hans-Michael & Bergfelder, Tim. The Concise CineGraph. Encyclopedia of German Cinema. Berghahn Books, 2009.
