= The Yogi =

- Film poster
- German: Der Yoghi
- Directed by: Paul Wegener; Rochus Gliese
- Written by: Paul Wegener
- Produced by: Paul Davidson
- Starring: Paul Wegener; Lyda Salmonova
- Cinematography: Mads Anton Madsen
- Production company: Wegener-Film
- Distributed by: PAGU
- Release date: 5 October 1916
- Country: Germany
- Languages: Silent; German intertitles

The Yogi (German: Der Yoghi) is a 1916 German silent drama film directed by Rochus Gliese and Paul Wegener and starring Wegener and Lyda Salmonova. Wegener plays a double role as an inventor and an Indian mystic.

It was shot at the Tempelhof Studios in Berlin. The film's sets were designed by Rochus Gliese.

== Cast ==
- Paul Wegener as The Yogi / The Inventor
- Lyda Salmonova as Myra
- Hedwig Gutzeit
- Fritz Huf as Gott Schiwa
