= Elsa Wagner =

German actress

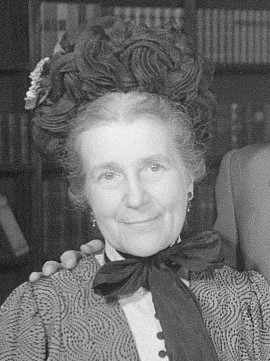
- Elsa Wagner in Der Snob (1946)
- Born: Elisabeth Karoline Auguste Wagner; 24 January 1881; Reval, Russian Empire
- Died: 17 August 1975 (aged 94); West Berlin, West Germany
- Occupation: Actress
- Years active: 1916–1973

Elsa Wagner (24 January 1881 – 17 August 1975) was a German actress who appeared in numerous theatrical productions and feature films during the 20th century, including 1920's The Cabinet of Dr. Caligari.

== Life and career ==
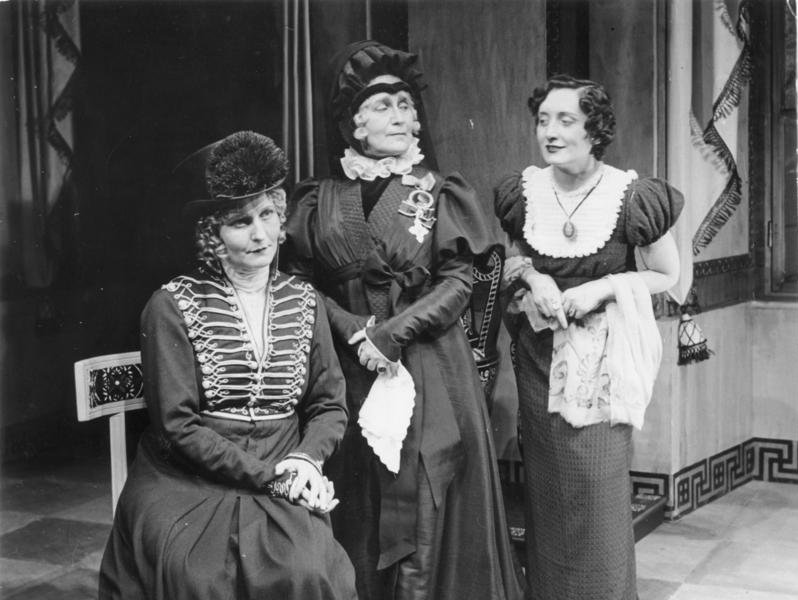
Elsa Wagner and Herma Clement performing their roles as attendants to Queen Luise (Emmy Sonnemann) in Hans Schwarz's 1935 Prinz von Preussen (Prince of Prussia).

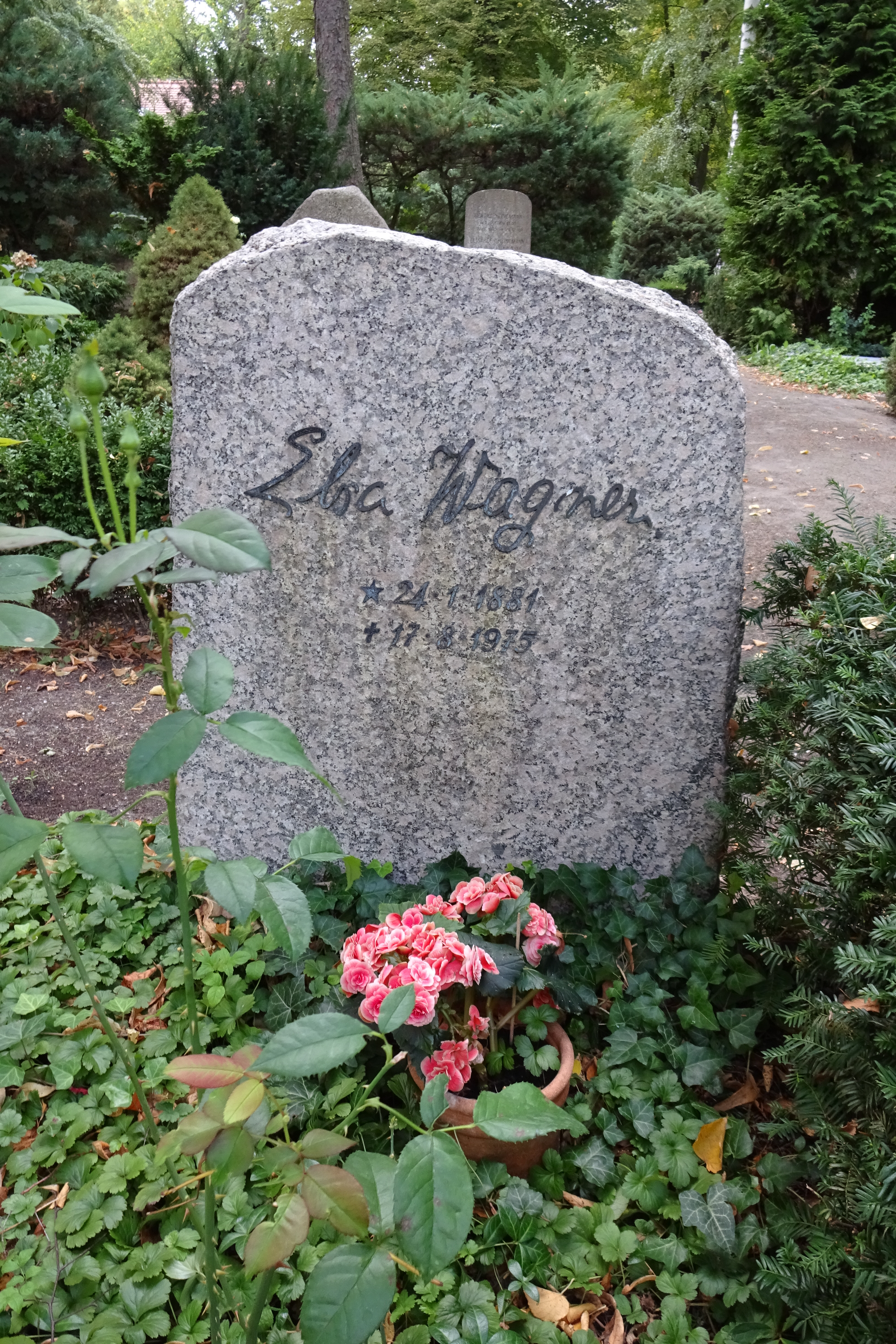
Grave in Friedhof Dahlem in Berlin-Dahlem

Born as Elisabeth Karoline Auguste Wagner on 24 January 1881 in Reval, in what is now Tallinn, Estonia, Elsa Wagner pursued training with Maria Spettini in Saint Petersburg, Russia prior to making her acting debut in Berlin, Germany in 1901. In addition to her performances on tour with multiple theater productions, including Faust and Peer Gynt, she went on to secure roles in more than 140 feature films, including Robert Wiene's Das Cabinet Des Dr. Caligari (The Cabinet of Dr. Caligari) and Karl Heinz Martin's Von Morgens bis Mitternachts (From Morn to Midnight) in 1920, F. W. Murnau's 1922 Das Brennende Acker (The Burning Earth), Gerhard Lamprecht's Die Buddenbrooks and Wiene's I.N.R.I. in 1923, and E. R. Dupont's 1929 Atlantik.

Wagner died in Berlin on 17 August 1975 and was interred at the Cemetery Dahlem.

== Selected filmography ==
- The Wandering Light (1916)
- The Foreign Prince (1918)
- The Rosentopf Case (1918)
- The Victors (1918)
- The Pied Piper of Hamelin (1918)
- Ruth's Two Husbands (1919)
- Anita Jo (1919)
- The Living Dead (1919)
- The Cabinet of Dr. Caligari (1920)
- Satanas (1920)
- The Night of Queen Isabeau (1920)
- The Marquise of Armiani (1920)
- The Golden Crown (1920)
- Monika Vogelsang (1920)
- The Closed Chain (1920)
- Comrades (1921)
- Wandering Souls (1921)
- Barmaid (1922)
- The Treasure of Gesine Jacobsen (1923)
- I.N.R.I. (1923)
- The Found Bride (1925)
- If Only It Weren't Love (1925)
- A Free People (1925)
- One Minute to Twelve (1925)
- People to Each Other (1926)
- Children of No Importance (1926)
- The Master of Nuremberg (1927)
- The Sporck Battalion (1927)
- The Girl with the Five Zeros (1927)
- Lotte (1928)
- The Old Fritz (1928)
- Violantha (1928)
- Luther (1928)
- The Burning Heart (1929)
- Marriage in Trouble (1929)
- Rustle of Spring (1929)
- Atlantik (1929)
- The Trunks of Mr. O.F. (1931)
- The Song of Life (1931)
- Three from the Unemployment Office (1932)
- The Eleven Schill Officers (1932)
- What Men Know (1933)
- Music in the Blood (1934)
- Hundred Days (1935)
- The Girl Irene (1936)
- Moscow-Shanghai (1936)
- The Divine Jetta (1937)
- Daphne and the Diplomat (1937)
- Ball at the Metropol (1937)
- Capers (1937)
- Unternehmen Michael (1937)
- Dangerous Game (1937)
- Anna Favetti (1938)
- You and I (1938)
- Freight from Baltimore (1938)
- Dance on the Volcano (1938)
- Target in the Clouds (1939)
- Her First Experience (1939)
- The Leghorn Hat (1939)
- Police Report (1939)
- Heimkehr (1941)
- The Waitress Anna (1941)
- A Gust of Wind (1942)
- Front Theatre (1942)
- The Impostor (1944)
- Life Calls (1944)
- A Beautiful Day (1944)
- Tell the Truth (1946)
- And the Heavens Above Us (1947)
- Wozzeck (1947)
- No Place for Love (1947)
- Thank You, I'm Fine (1948)
- Night of the Twelve (1949)
- The Marriage of Figaro (1949)
- Christina (1953)
- Love's Awakening (1953)
- The Stronger Woman (1953)
- Before God and Man (1955)
- La Paloma (1959)
- Crime After School (1959)
- The Haunted Castle (1960)
- Sweetheart of the Gods (1960)
- Emil and the Detectives (1964)
- Our Willi Is the Best (1971)
- The Pedestrian (1973)
