= Arnolt Bronnen =

Austrian playwright and director

- Born: 19 August 1895; Vienna, Austria-Hungary
- Died: 12 October 1959 (aged 64); East Berlin, East Germany
- Occupations: Playwright; Theatre director
- Writing career
- Notable work: Parricide (1922)
- Literary movement: Expressionism

Arnolt Bronnen (19 August 1895 – 12 October 1959) was an Austrian playwright and director.

== Life and career ==
Bronnen was born in Vienna, Austria, the son of the Austrian-Jewish writer Ferdinand Bronner and his Christian wife Martha Bronner. Bronnen's most famous play is the Expressionist drama Parricide (Vatermord, 1922); its première production is notable, among other things, for being that from which Bronnen's friend, the young Bertolt Brecht in an early stage of his directing career, withdrew, after being taken to hospital with malnutrition and the actors of the cast, led by Heinrich George, walked out on him. According to The Cambridge Guide to Theatre, the "erotic, anti-bourgeois, black expressionism" of the play "caused a sensation" when it was eventually performed.

Bronnen also wrote Birth of Youth (Geburt der Jugend, 1922) and Die Excesse (1923). After having collaborated on film treatments and various theatrical projects together, in 1923 Bronnen and Brecht co-directed a condensed version of Pastor Ephraim Magnus (a nihilistic, Expressionist play, according to The Cambridge Guide, "stuffed with perversities and sado-masochistic motifs") by Hans Henny Jahnn. Later in his life he wrote reportage plays.

Bronnen signed the Gelöbnis treuester Gefolgschaft, a "vow of most faithful allegiance" to Adolf Hitler in 1933, and was program director for the public TV station Fernsehsender Paul Nipkow, but after the Second World War he became a communist.

Bronnen died of heart failure in East Berlin and is buried in the Dorotheenstadt cemetery.

== Selected filmography ==
- The Island of Tears (1923)

== Sources ==
- Banham, Martin, ed. 1998. The Cambridge Guide to Theatre. Cambridge: Cambridge UP. ISBN 0-521-43437-8.
- Sacks, Glendyr. 1994. "A Brecht Calendar." In The Cambridge Companion to Brecht. Ed. Peter Thomson and Glendyr Sacks. Cambridge Companions to Literature. Cambridge: Cambridge University Press. ISBN 0-521-41446-6. pp. xvii–xxvii.
- Taylor, Ronald. 1980. Literature and Society in Germany, 1918–1945. Harvester studies in contemporary literature and culture 3. Brighton, Sussex: Harvester Press / Totowa, New Jersey: Barnes & Noble. ISBN 9780389200369.
- Thomson, Peter. 1994. "Brecht's Lives." In The Cambridge Companion to Brecht. Ed. Peter Thomson and Glendyr Sacks. Cambridge Companions to Literature. Cambridge: Cambridge University Press. ISBN 0-521-41446-6. p. 22–39.
- Willett, John and Ralph Manheim. 1970. "Introduction." In Collected Plays: One by Bertolt Brecht. Ed. John Willett and Ralph Manheim. Bertolt Brecht: Plays, Poetry and Prose Ser. London: Methuen. ISBN 0-416-03280-X. pp. vii–xvii.
