= The Love Nest (1922 film) =

1922 film

- Directed by: Rudolf Walther-Fein
- Written by: Hans Brennert
- Produced by: Rudolf Dworsky
- Starring: Paul Wegener; Reinhold Schünzel; Lyda Salmonova
- Cinematography: Willy Großstück; Kurt Lande
- Production company: Aafa-Film
- Distributed by: Aafa-Film
- Release date: 26 June 1922
- Country: Germany
- Languages: Silent; German intertitles

The Love Nest (German: Das Liebesnest) is a 1922 German silent film directed by Rudolf Walther-Fein and starring Paul Wegener, Reinhold Schünzel, and Lyda Salmonova. It was released in two parts.

The film's sets were designed by the art director Rochus Gliese.

== Cast ==
- Reinhold Schünzel as Lothar von Brandt
- Paul Wegener
- Lyda Salmonova
- Hans Adalbert Schlettow
- Olga Limburg
- Käthe Haack
- Erich Kaiser-Titz
- Wilhelm Diegelmann
- Margit Barnay
- Hugo Flink
- Max Gülstorff
- Hermann Picha
- Hermine Sterler

== Bibliography ==
- Bock, Hans-Michael; Bergfelder, Tim, eds. (2009). The Concise Cinegraph: Encyclopaedia of German Cinema. New York: Berghahn Books. ISBN 978-1-57181-655-9.
