= Fritz Feld =

German-American actor (1900–1993)

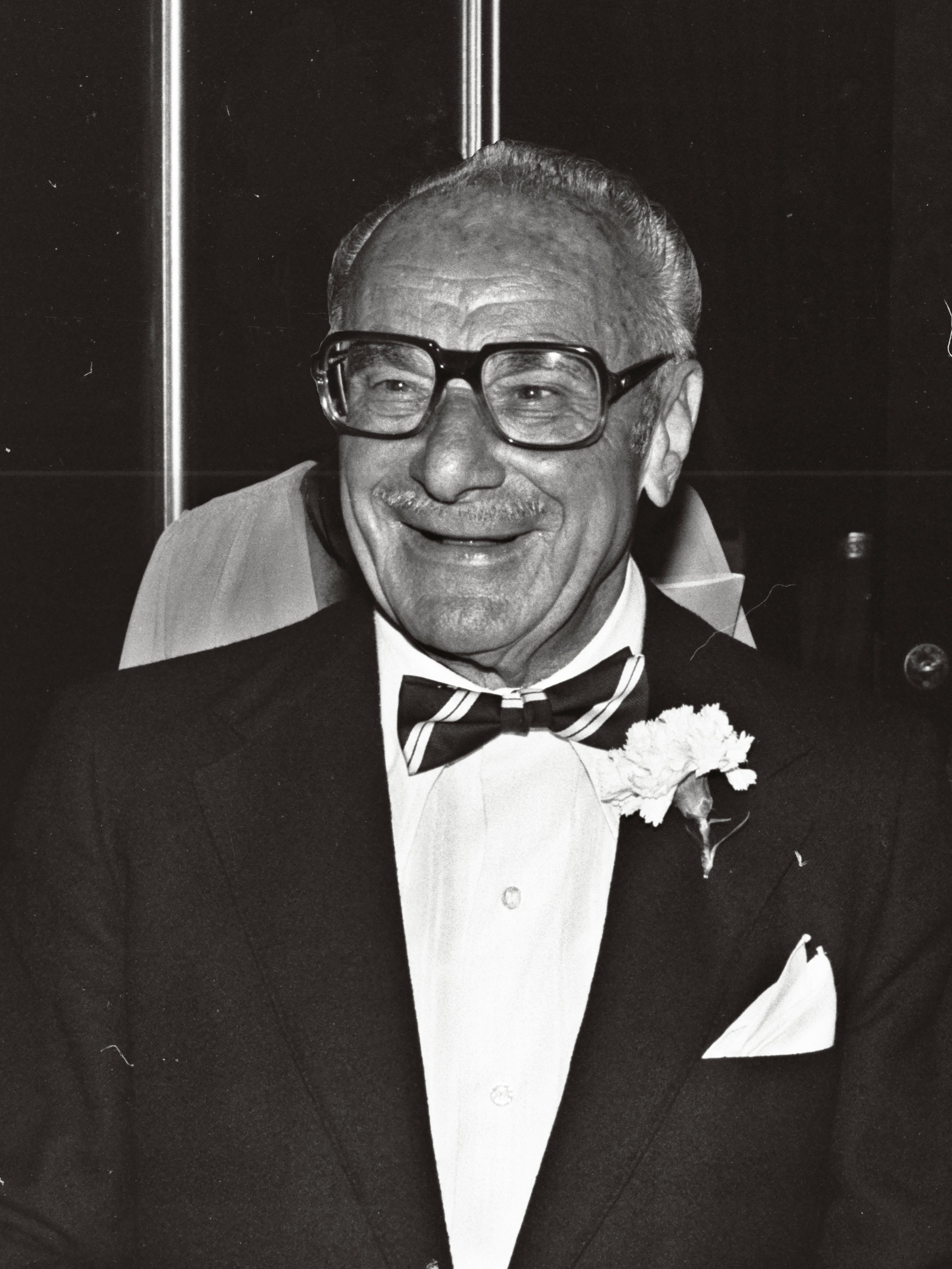
- Feld in 1979
- Born: Fritz Feilchenfeld; October 15, 1900; Berlin, German Empire
- Died: November 18, 1993 (aged 93); Los Angeles, California, U.S.
- Resting place: Mount Sinai Memorial Park Cemetery, Los Angeles
- Occupation: Actor
- Years active: 1917–1989
- Spouse: Virginia Christine (m. 1940)
- Children: 2
- Relatives: Rudi Feld (brother)

Fritz Feld (October 15, 1900 – November 18, 1993) was a German-American film character actor who appeared in over 140 films in 72 years, both silent and sound. His trademark was to slap his mouth with the palm of his hand to create a "pop" sound.

== Early life and career ==
Born to a Jewish family in Berlin, Germany, Feld began his acting career in Germany in 1917, making his screen debut in Der Golem und die Tänzerin (The Golem and the Dancing Girl). His early career in the United States included touring with Morris Gest's production of The Miracle in the mid-1920s. Feld filmed the sound sequences of the Cecil B. DeMille film The Godless Girl (1929), released by Pathé, without DeMille's supervision, since DeMille had already broken his contract with Pathé, and signed with Metro-Goldwyn-Mayer.

He developed a characterization that came to define him. His trademark was to slap his mouth with the palm of his hand to create a "pop!" sound that indicated both his superiority and his annoyance. The first use of the "pop" sound was in If You Knew Susie (1948).

Feld often played the part of a maître d'hôtel, but also a variety of aristocrats and eccentrics. In the 1938 screwball comedy Bringing Up Baby, he played the role of Dr. Lehman. In 1939, he appeared with the Marx Brothers in At The Circus in the small role of French orchestra conductor Jardinet. He appeared in nine films with Jerry Lewis between 1954 and 1970, in addition to working with Lewis and Dean Martin on their television program, The Colgate Comedy Hour.

In his later years, Feld appeared in several Walt Disney films and also played an uncharacteristically dramatic role in Barfly. He also portrayed one of the Harmonia Gardens waiters in the movie Hello Dolly! (1969). In addition to films, he acted in numerous television series in guest roles, including the recurring role of Zumdish, the manager of the intergalactic Celestial Department Store on Lost In Space, in two season-two episodes, "The Android Machine" and "The Toymaker". Zumdish returned in the season-three episode "Two Weeks In Space". In one 1967 episode of The Man from U.N.C.L.E., "The Napoleon's Tomb Affair", Feld played a banker, a beatnik, a diplomat, and a waiter.

Feld made his final film appearance in 1989.

== Personal life ==
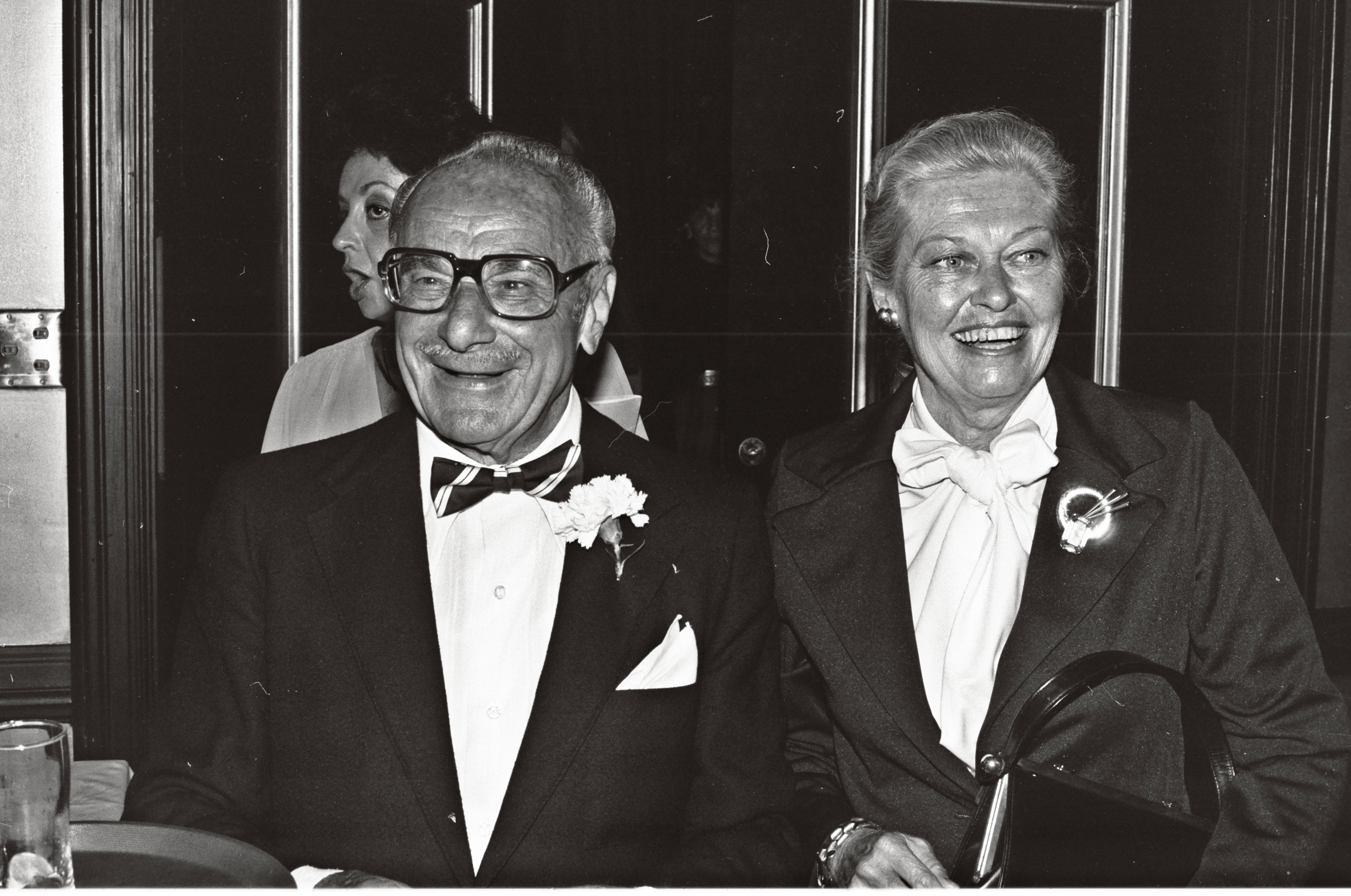
Fritz Feld, with his wife, Virginia Christine (1979)

Feld was married to actress Virginia Christine from 1940 until his death in 1993 in a convalescent home in Los Angeles, California; Christine died in 1996. She was 20 years his junior and later became famous for her role as "Mrs. Olson" in television commercials for Folgers coffee, The couple is interred at the Jewish Mount Sinai Memorial Park Cemetery in the Hollywood Hills section of Los Angeles.

The couple had two sons, Steven and Danny.

Fritz Feld was a strong enough amateur chess player that 1948 U.S. champion Herman Steiner and international master George Koltanowski would come to his home some evenings in the 1940s, with the three of them playing chess until 6:00 the following morning, as mentioned in The Bobby Fischer I Knew and Other Stories (Denker & Parr, 1995).

== Partial filmography ==
- The Golem and the Dancing Girl (1917) as Hotel Page
- Dämon der Welt. 1. Das Schicksal des Edgar Morton (1919)
- The Golem: How He Came into the World (1920) as Jester (uncredited)
- Christian Wahnschaffe (1920)
- A Ship Comes In (1928) as Sokol
- The Last Command (1928) as A Revolutionist
- Blindfold (1928) as Thomas Bernard
- Broadway (1929) as Mose Levett
- Black Magic (1929) as James Fraser
- One Hysterical Night (1929) as Paganini
- I Met Him in Paris (1937) as Swiss Hotel Clerk
- Lancer Spy (1937) as Fritz Mueller
- Expensive Husbands (1937) as Herr Meyer, Hotel Director
- Hollywood Hotel (1937) as The Russian
- True Confession (1937) as Krayler's Butler
- Tovarich (1937) as Martelleau, neighbor
- Annabel Takes a Tour (1938)
- Bringing Up Baby (1938) as Dr. Lehman
- Romance in the Dark (1938) as Fritz
- Go Chase Yourself (1938) as Count Pierre Fountaine de Louis-Louis
- Gold Diggers in Paris (1938) as Luis Leoni
- I'll Give a Million (1938) as Max Primerose
- The Affairs of Annabel (1938) as Vladimir
- Campus Confessions (1938) as 'Lady MacBeth'
- Artists and Models Abroad (1938) as Dubois
- Swingtime in the Movies (1938, Short) as Mr. Nitvitch
- Idiot's Delight (1939) as Pittatek
- When Tomorrow Comes (1939) as Nicholas
- At the Circus (1939) as Jardinet
- Little Accident (1939) as Malisse
- Everything Happens at Night (1939) as Gendarme
- Little Old New York (1940) as Tavern Keeper
- Millionaire Playboy (1940) as 'G.G.' Gorta
- Ma! He's Making Eyes at Me (film) (1940) as Forsythe
- It's a Date (1940) as Headwaiter
- I Was an Adventuress (1940) as Henri Gautier
- Sandy Is a Lady (1940) as Mario
- Victory (1940) as Signor Makanoff
- Come Live with Me (1941) as Mac, the Headwaiter (uncredited)
- Three Sons o' Guns (1941) as Blotievkin
- World Premiere (1941) as Field Marshal Muller
- You Belong to Me (1941) as Hotel Desk Clerk
- Skylark (1941) as Maitre d'Hotel (uncredited)
- The Mexican Spitfire's Baby (1941) as Lieutenant Pierre Gaston de la Blanc
- Four Jacks and a Jill (1942) as Mr. Hoople
- Shut My Big Mouth (1942) as Robert Oglethorpe
- Sleepytime Gal (1942) as Chef Petrovich
- Maisie Gets Her Man (1942) as Professor Orco
- Iceland (1942) as Herr Tegnar
- Heavenly Music (1943) as Niccolò Paganini (uncredited)
- Henry Aldrich Swings It (1943) as Josef Altman
- Phantom of the Opera (1943) as Lecours
- Holy Matrimony (1943) as Critic
- Passport to Destiny (1944) as Chief Janitor
- Knickerbocker Holiday (1944) as Poffenburgh
- Take It Big (1944) as Doctor Dittenhoffer
- Ever Since Venus (1944) as Michele
- The Great John L. (1945) as Claire's Manager
- George White's Scandals (1945) as Montescu
- Captain Tugboat Annie (1945) as Al Pucci aka Alfred Puccini
- The Catman of Paris (1946) as Prefect of Police
- The Wife of Monte Cristo (1946) as Bonnett
- Her Sister's Secret (1946) as New Orleans Wine Salesman
- Gentleman Joe Palooka (1946) as Club Steward
- I've Always Loved You (1946) as Nicholas Kavlun
- Carnival in Costa Rica (1947) as Hotel Clerk
- Fun on a Weekend (1947) as Sergei Stroganoff
- The Secret Life of Walter Mitty (1947) as Anatole
- If You Knew Susie (1948) as Chez Henri
- My Girl Tisa (1948) as Professor Tabor
- The Noose Hangs High (1948) as Psychiatrist
- Julia Misbehaves (1948) as Pepito
- You Gotta Stay Happy (1948) as Pierre
- Trouble Makers (1948) as Mr. Andre Schmidtlap – Hotel Manager
- Mexican Hayride (1948) as Professor Ganzmeyer
- The Lovable Cheat (1949) as Monsieur Louis
- The Great Lover (1949) as Waiter (uncredited)
- Belle of Old Mexico (1950) as Dr. Quincy
- Appointment with Danger (1950) as Window Dresser (uncredited)
- Riding High (1950) as French Dressmaker (uncredited)
- The Jackpot (1950) as Long-Haired Pianist (uncredited)
- Rhythm Inn (1951) as Professor Rinaldo
- Missing Women (1951) as Pierre
- Kentucky Jubilee (1951) as Rudolph 'Rudi' Jouvet
- Little Egypt (1951) as Professor
- Journey Into Light (1951) as Clothing Salesman
- Sky High (1951) as Dr. Kapok
- My Favorite Spy (1951) as Dress Designer (uncredited)
- Aaron Slick from Punkin Crick (1952) as Headwaiter
- Has Anybody Seen My Gal (1952) as Alvarez (uncredited)
- O. Henry's Full House (1952) as Maurice (segment "The Gift of the Magi") (uncredited)
- Call Me Madam (1953) as Hat Clerk (uncredited)
- Crime Wave (1953) as Jess (uncredited)
- The French Line (1953) as Last Cab Driver (uncredited)
- Paris Playboys (1954) as Marcel, Maitre d'
- Riding Shotgun (1954) as Fritz
- Casanova's Big Night (1954) as Baron Mittschalk of Cardovia (uncredited)
- Living It Up (1954) as The Barber (uncredited)
- Jail Busters (1955) as Dr. Fernando F. Fordyce (uncredited)
- Up in Smoke (1957) as Dr. Bluzak
- Alfred Hitchcock Presents (1958) (Season 4 Episode 10: "Tea Time") as Maitre D
- Juke Box Rhythm (1959) as Ambrose
- Don't Give Up the Ship (1959) as Room Service Waiter (uncredited)
- The Miracle of the White Reindeer (1960) as Geronimo
- The Ladies Man (1961) as Mrs. Wellenmellon's Hairdresser (uncredited)
- The Errand Boy (1961) as Busby, Roaring '20s' Director
- Pocketful of Miracles (1961) as Pierre
- Promises! Promises! (1963) as Ship's Doctor
- Who's Minding the Store? (1963) as Irving Cahastrophe, the Gourmet Manager
- 4 for Texas (1963) as Fritz
- The Patsy (1964) as Maitre D' (uncredited)
- Harlow (1965) as Fritz, Window Washer in Movie (uncredited)
- Made in Paris (1966) as Josef, Night Watchman (uncredited)
- Three on a Couch (1966) as The Attaché
- Way... Way Out (1966) as Breckinridge, the Maitre d' (uncredited)
- Penelope (1966) as Penelope's Dance Partner (uncredited)
- Lost in Space (1966–1967) as Mr. Zumdish in 3 eps
- Caprice (1967) as Swiss Innkeeper (uncredited)
- Barefoot in the Park (1967) as Restaurant Proprietor
- The Wicked Dreams of Paula Schultz (1968) as Kessel
- The Comic (1969) as Armand
- Hello, Dolly! (1969) as Rudolph's Assistant
- The Computer Wore Tennis Shoes (1969) as Sigmund Van Dyke
- The Phynx (1970) as Fritz Feld
- Which Way to the Front? (1970) as Von Runstadt (uncredited)
- Herbie Rides Again (1974) as Maître d'
- The Strongest Man in the World (1975) as Uncle Frederick
- The Sunshine Boys (1975) as Mr. Gilbert, Man at Audition
- Won Ton Ton, the Dog Who Saved Hollywood (1976) as Rudy's Butler
- Silent Movie (1976) as Maitre d'
- Freaky Friday (1976) as Mr. Jackman
- The World's Greatest Lover (1977) as Tomaso Abalone
- Legend of the Northwest (1978) as Trapper
- Herbie Goes Bananas (1980) as Chief Steward
- History of the World, Part I (1981) as Maitre 'D (The Roman Empire)
- Heidi's Song (1982) as Sebastian (voice)
- Barfly (1987) as Bum
- Homer and Eddie (1989) as Mortician (final film role)
