= The Island of Tears =

1923 film directed by Lothar Mendes

- Directed by: Lothar Mendes
- Written by: Arnolt Bronnen; Ruth Goetz
- Produced by: Paul Ebner; Maxim Galitzenstein
- Starring: Lya De Putti; Paul Wegener; Lyda Salmonova
- Cinematography: Julius Balting; Werner Brandes; Theodor Sparkuhl; Károly Vass
- Music by: Bruno Schulz
- Production company: Maxim-Film
- Distributed by: Deulig-Verleih
- Release date: 1 November 1923
- Running time: 73 minutes
- Country: Germany
- Languages: Silent; German intertitles

The Island of Tears (German: S.O.S. Die Insel der Tränen) is a 1923 German silent drama film directed by Lothar Mendes and starring Lya De Putti, Paul Wegener, and Lyda Salmonova. The film's sets were designed by the art directors Fritz Lück and Walter Reimann.

== Cast ==
- Lya De Putti as Lilian - Harding's Tochter
- Paul Wegener as Jack
- Lyda Salmonova as Frau des Matrosen Jack
- Olga Engl as John Harding's Frau
- Gertrud de Lalsky
- Rudolf Forster as Harry - Offizier der amerik. Marine
- Eugen Burg as John Harding
- Alfred Halm as Kapitän der 'Manitoba'
- Erna Hauk as Stella - Lilian's Freundin

== Bibliography ==
- Bock, Hans-Michael & Bergfelder, Tim. The Concise CineGraph. Encyclopedia of German Cinema. Berghahn Books, 2009.
