= The Midnight Venus =

1951 film

- Directed by: Ferdinand Dörfler
- Written by: Werner Illing
- Produced by: Ferdinand Dörfler
- Starring: Theo Lingen; Paul Kemp; Maria Andergast
- Cinematography: Franz Koch
- Edited by: Erwin Niecke
- Music by: Josef Niessen
- Production company: Dörfler-Filmproduktion
- Distributed by: Union-Film
- Release date: 1 March 1951
- Running time: 96 minutes
- Country: West Germany
- Language: German

The Midnight Venus (German: Die Mitternachtsvenus) is a 1951 West German comedy film directed by Ferdinand Dörfler and starring Theo Lingen, Paul Kemp and Maria Andergast. It was shot at the Bavaria Studios in Munich. The film's sets were designed by the art directors Franz Neumann and Erwin Tiebe.

== Cast ==
- Theo Lingen as Meister Anton
- Paul Kemp as Hansl
- Maria Andergast as Frau Anna
- Hans Schwarz Jr. as Reitersepp
- Hubert von Meyerinck as Director Meyer
- Fita Benkhoff as Madame Lavable
- Hella Lexington as Miss Spleen
- Guenther R. Ewers as von Kitschampur
- Lotte Stein as van der Gould
- Lotte Lang as Marei

== Bibliography ==
- Hans-Michael Bock and Tim Bergfelder. The Concise Cinegraph: An Encyclopedia of German Cinema. Berghahn Books, 2009.
