= Greta Schröder =

German actress

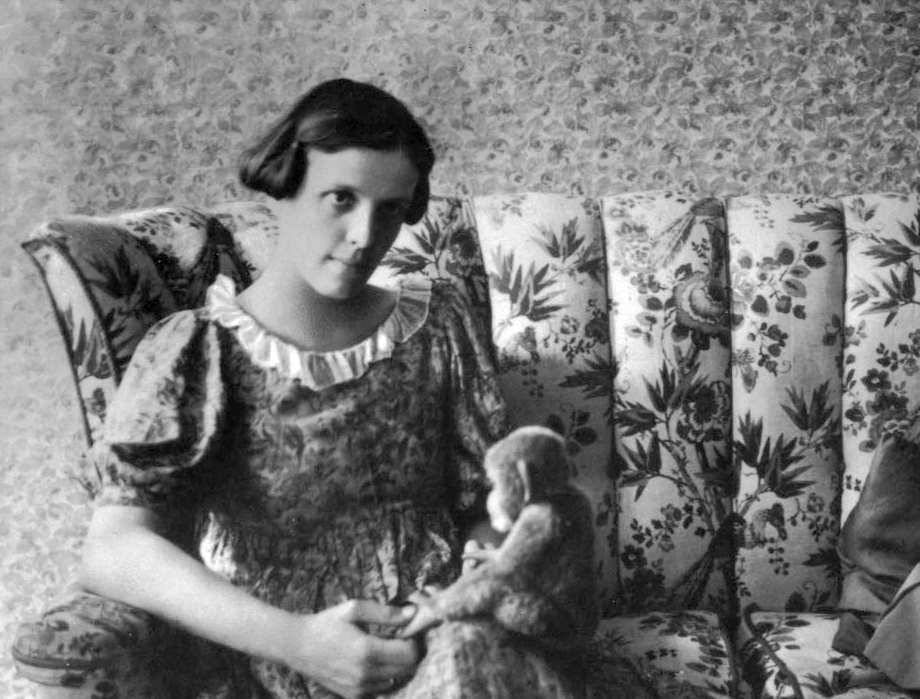
- Greta Schröder in 1919
- Born: Margarethe Schröder; 27 June 1892; Düsseldorf, German Empire
- Died: 8 June 1980 (aged 87); West Berlin, West Germany
- Other names: Greta Schröder-Matray; Grete Wegener; Greta Schröder-Wegener
- Spouses: Ernst Matray (m. 1912; div. 1921) Paul Wegener (m. 1924, divorced)

Greta Schröder (27 June 1892 – 8 June 1980) was a German actress. She is best known for the role of Ellen Hutter, Thomas Hutter's wife and the cause of Count Orlok's destruction in Nosferatu (1922). In the fictionalized 2000 film Shadow of the Vampire, she is portrayed as having been a famous actress during the making of Nosferatu, but in fact she was little known. The bulk of her career was during the 1920s, and she continued to act well into the 1950s, but by the 1930s her roles had diminished to only occasional appearances. Following a failed marriage with struggling actor Ernst Matray, she was married to actor and film director Paul Wegener.

According to the Austrian writer Kay Weniger, Greta Schröder died in 1980, though some sources mention 1967.

== Filmography ==
=== Actress ===
- 1913: Die Insel der Seligen
- 1920: The Red Peacock as Alfred's sister
- 1920: The Golem: How He Came into the World as a lady of the court
- 1920: The Closed Chain
- 1921: The Lost Shadow as Countess Dorothea Durande
- 1921: Circus of Life as Alegria
- 1921: Marizza as Sadja
- 1922: Nosferatu as Ellen Hutter
- 1922: Es leuchtet meine Liebe
- 1923: Brüder
- 1923: Paganini as Antonia Paganini
- 1930: Die zwölfte Stunde - Eine Nacht des Grauens (re-edited version of Nosferatu with sound)
- 1937: Victoria the Great as Baroness Lehzen
- 1938: Sixty Glorious Years as Baroness Lehzen
- 1943: Melody of a Great City
- 1943: Wild Bird as Jutta Lossen
- 1945: Kolberg as Sophie Marie von Voß
- 1951: Maria Theresa
- 1953: Stars Over Colombo
- 1953: Anna Louise and Anton

=== Writer ===
- 1915: Zucker und Zimt
- 1916: Das Phantom der Oper

== References in popular culture ==
- In the 2000 film Shadow of the Vampire, which depicted the production of Nosferatu, Catherine McCormack portrayed Greta Schröder.
