= Wandering Souls =

1921 film directed by Carl Froelich

- Directed by: Carl Froelich
- Written by: Walter Supper; Carl Froelich
- Based on: The Idiot by Fyodor Dostoevsky
- Produced by: Erich Pommer
- Starring: Asta Nielsen; Alfred Abel; Walter Janssen; Guido Herzfeld
- Cinematography: Axel Graatkjær
- Production company: Russo Film
- Distributed by: Decla-Bioscop
- Release date: 3 March 1921
- Running time: 123 minutes
- Country: Germany
- Languages: Silent; German intertitles

Wandering Souls (German: Irrende Seelen) is a 1921 German silent drama film directed by Carl Froelich and starring Asta Nielsen, Alfred Abel, and Walter Janssen. It was based on Fyodor Dostoyevsky's 1869 novel The Idiot. The film was the first of three to be made by Russo Film, a small production company set up by Decla-Bioscop to make literary adaptations. The 123-minute film was shot at the Johannisthal Studios in Berlin. It premiered on 3 March 1921 at the Marmorhaus in Berlin.

== Cast ==
- Asta Nielsen as Nastassja Baraschkowa
- Alfred Abel as Parfen, Rogoschins Sohn
- Walter Janssen as Prinz Myschkin
- Guido Herzfeld as Semjon Rogoschin
- Lyda Salmonova as Tochter Aglaia Jepantschin
- Maria Connard as Gawrils Mutter Nina Alexandrowna
- Lili Donecker as Marie
- Eugenia Eduardova as Solotänzerin
- Leonhard Haskel as General Jepantschin
- Simon Konarski as Eugen Ratomsky
- Adolf E. Licho as Herr Lebedoff
- Lydia Potechina as Alte Gutsbesitzerin
- Auguste Prasch-Grevenberg as Frau Rogoschin
- Frida Richard as Maries Mutter
- Ernst Rotmund as Gawril Iwolgin-Ganja
- Lydia Savitzky as Tochter Adelaida Jepantschin
- Erika Unruh as Gawrils Schwester Warwara
- Marga von Kierska as Tochter Alexandra Jepantschin
- Vasilij Vronski as Trotzky
- Elsa Wagner as Frau Jepantschin
- Sylvia Torf

== Bibliography ==
- Hardt, Ursula. From Caligari to California: Erich Pommer's life in the International Film Wars. Berghahn Books, 1996.
