= Ferdinand Dörfler =

Ferdinand Dörfler (born 18 December 1903 in Munich, died 4 June 1965) was a German screenwriter and film director.

== Selected filmography ==
- Everything for the Company (1950)
- The Midnight Venus (1951)
- Wild West in Upper Bavaria (1951)
- Monks, Girls and Hungarian Soldiers (1952)
- The Night Without Morals (1953)
- The Sinful Village (1954)
- Der Frontgockel (1955)
- Besuch aus heiterem Himmel (1959)
- The Double Husband (1955)
