= The Closed Chain =

1920 film

- Directed by: Paul L. Stein
- Written by: Erich Wulffen
- Produced by: Paul Davidson
- Starring: Pola Negri; Aud Egede-Nissen; Carl Ebert
- Cinematography: Fritz Arno Wagner
- Production company: PAGU
- Distributed by: UFA
- Release date: 10 December 1920
- Country: Germany
- Languages: Silent; German intertitles

The Closed Chain (German: Die geschlossene Kette) is a 1920 German silent film directed by Paul L. Stein and starring Pola Negri, Aud Egede-Nissen, and Carl Ebert.

The film's sets were designed by the art director Jack Winter

== Cast ==
- Pola Negri
- Aud Egede-Nissen
- Carl Ebert
- Greta Schröder
- Rudolf Klein-Rhoden
- Lotte Stein
- Albert Steinrück
- Elsa Wagner
- Boris Michailow

== Bibliography ==
- Kotowski, Mariusz (2014). Pola Negri: Hollywood's First Femme Fatale. Lexington: University Press of Kentucky. ISBN 978-0-8131-4489-4.
