= The Gypsy Baron (1927 film) =

1927 film

- German: Der Zigeunerbaron
- Directed by: Frederic Zelnik
- Written by: Fanny Carlsen; Mór Jókai (novel); Melchior Lengyel; Ignaz Schnitzer (libretto)
- Produced by: Frederic Zelnik
- Starring: Lya Mara; Michael Bohnen; William Dieterle
- Cinematography: Frederik Fuglsang; Friedrich Weinmann
- Music by: Pasquale Perris
- Production company: Zelnik-Film
- Distributed by: Deutsche Lichtspiel-Syndikat
- Release date: 11 March 1927
- Country: Germany
- Languages: Silent; German intertitles

The Gypsy Baron (German: Der Zigeunerbaron) is a 1927 German silent adventure film directed by Frederic Zelnik and starring Lya Mara, Michael Bohnen, and William Dieterle. It is based on the storyline of the operetta The Gypsy Baron.

The film's sets were designed by André Andrejew and Alexander Ferenczy.

== Cast ==
- Lya Mara as Saffi
- Michael Bohnen as Calman Zsupan
- William Dieterle as Sandor Barinkay
- Ernő Verebes as Count Ottokar
- Vivian Gibson as Arsena
- Harry Hardt as Hommonay
- Rudolf Klein-Rogge as Mehmed Ali
- Ferdinand Bonn as Voivode
- Eugen Burg as Der Kaiser
- Emil Fenyő as Count Carnero
- Maria Forescu as Czipra
- Heinrich Peer as cvhancellor
