= Herbert Kiper =

German actor

- Born: 17 April 1897; Wiesbaden, Hesse, German Empire
- Died: 9 April 1978 (aged 80); West Berlin, West Germany
- Occupation: Actor
- Years active: 1918-1959 (film)

Herbert Kiper (1897–1978) was a German stage and film actor.

== Selected filmography ==
- Dancer of Death (1920)
- Without Meyer, No Celebration is Complete (1931)
- Duty Is Duty (1931)
- Quartet of Five (1949)
- Heart of Stone (1950)
- The Call of the Sea (1951)
- All Clues Lead to Berlin (1952)
- The Uncle from America (1953)
- The Dancing Heart (1953)
- Knall and Fall as Detectives (1953)
- Josef the Chaste (1953)
- Carola Lamberti – Eine vom Zirkus (1954)
- Ball of Nations (1954)
- Wenn der Vater mit dem Sohne (1955)
- Swelling Melodies (1955)
- My Wife Makes Music (1958)

== Bibliography ==
- Torsten Körner. Der kleine Mann als Star: Heinz Rühmann und seine Filme der 50er Jahre. Campus Verlag, 2001.
