= Eugenia Eduardova =

Russian ballet dancer and teacher

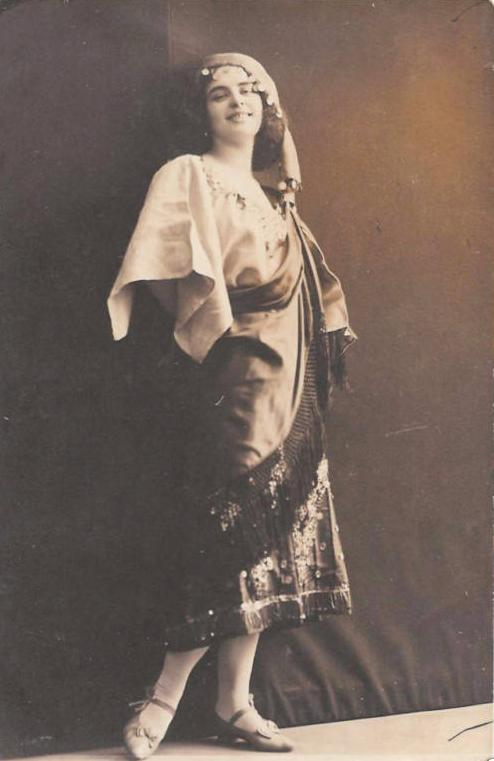
- Born: 1882; Saint Petersburg
- Died: 10 December 1960 (aged 77–78); New York City
- Known for: Ballet

Eugenia Eduardova (1882 – 10 December 1960) was a Russian ballet dancer and teacher.

== Biography ==
Eduardova was born in Saint Petersburg in 1882. She trained as a dancer and performed in Petipa ballets with the Mariinsky Ballet from 1901 to 1917. She danced with Anna Pavlova before she moved to Berlin. Eduardova also acted, appearing in a German silent film, Wandering Souls, in the 20s. Eduardova opened her own dance studio after working as the ballet master for Grosse Volksoper. In 1935 she was forced to leave Germany. Initially she moved to Paris before moving to the United States. Eduardova trained Vera Zorina, George Skibine, Alexander von Swaine and Yuri Algaroff. Eduardova married Alexei Davidov. Eduardova died 10 December 1960, in New York.
