= Lucrezia Borgia (1922 film) =

1922 film directed by Richard Oswald

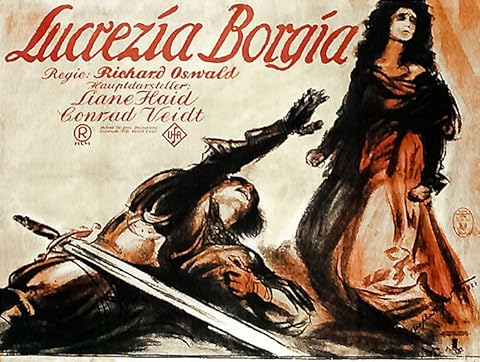
- Directed by: Richard Oswald
- Written by: Harry Sheff (original novel); Richard Oswald
- Starring: Conrad Veidt; Liane Haid; Albert Bassermann; Paul Wegener
- Cinematography: Carl Drews; Karl Freund; Károly Vass; Frederik Fuglsang
- Production company: Richard-Oswald-Produktion
- Distributed by: UFA
- Release date: 20 October 1922
- Running time: 96 minutes
- Country: Germany
- Languages: Silent; German intertitles

Lucrezia Borgia is a 1922 German silent historical film directed by Richard Oswald and starring Conrad Veidt, Liane Haid, Paul Wegener, and Albert Bassermann. It was based on a novel by Harry Sheff, and portrayed the life of the Renaissance Italian aristocrat Lucrezia Borgia (1480–1519). Botho Hoefer and Robert Neppach worked as the film's art directors, designing the period sets needed. It was shot at the Tempelhof Studios in Berlin. Karl Freund was one of the cinematographers. Famed French director Abel Gance remade the film in 1935.

Cesare Borgia (Veidt) is a monstrous villain who will do anything for pleasure and power, even seducing his own cousin Lucrezia (Haid) and murdering his male siblings. The Borgias were a medieval family known for their corruption under the rule of Pope Alexander VI. Lucrezia Borgia changed real life siblings Cesare and Lucrezia Borgia into cousins, with Cesare and Juan referred to as "the nephew(s) of the Pope", not his sons. This film version made Lucrezia a more sympathetic character, blaming Cesare for causing her indiscretions. Director Richard Oswald's depiction of the family was seen as an attack on the Catholic Church, thus the film was not able to be shown in the U.S. until 1928, and even then the American prints were edited down to 75 minutes.

Richard Oswald directed a number of classic horror films, including The Picture of Dorian Gray (1917), Eerie Tales (1919), The Hound of the Baskervilles (1914-1915), and Uncanny Stories (1932), a remake of the 1919 film. Conrad Veidt and Paul Wegener were in the cast. Actor William Dieterle later moved to Hollywood where he directed the Charles Laughton version of The Hunchback of Notre Dame in 1939.

== Cast ==
- Conrad Veidt as Cesare Borgia
- Liane Haid as Lucrezia Borgia
- Albert Bassermann as Papst Alexander VI Rodrigo Borgia
- Paul Wegener as Micheletto
- Heinrich George as Sebastiano
- Adolf E. Licho as Lodowico
- William Dieterle as Giovanni Sforza, Lucrezia's impotent husband
- Lothar Müthel as Juan Borgia
- Alfons Fryland as Alfonso, Prince of Aragon
- Kathe Oswald as Naomi
- Alexander Granach as Prisoner
- Anita Berber as Julia Orsini
- Lyda Salmonova as Diabola, Tierbändigerin
- Mary Douce as Florentina
- Max Pohl as Fratelli, Waffenschmied
- Adele Sandrock as Die Äbtissen
- Wilhelm Diegelmann as Wirt
- Philipp Manning as Diener Cesares
- Hugo Döblin as Diener Cesares
- Ernst Pittschau as Manfredo
- Clementine Plessner as Fratellis Frau
- Viktoria Strauß as Rosaura
- Tibor Lubinszky as Gennaro, Page

== Bibliography ==
- Elsaesser, Thomas (2000). Weimar Cinema and After: Germany's Historical Imaginary. London: Routledge. ISBN 978-1-135-07859-1.
