= Vanina =

1922 film

- Directed by: Arthur von Gerlach
- Written by: Carl Mayer; Stendhal (novella)
- Starring: Asta Nielsen; Paul Wegener; Paul Hartmann
- Cinematography: Frederik Fuglsang; Willy Gaebel
- Production company: PAGU
- Distributed by: UFA
- Release date: 6 October 1922
- Running time: 68 minutes
- Country: Germany
- Languages: Silent; German intertitles

Full movie

Vanina (German:Vanina oder Die Galgenhochzeit) is a 1922 German silent historical film directed by Arthur von Gerlach and starring Asta Nielsen, Paul Wegener and Paul Hartmann.

The art direction was by Walter Reimann. It was shot at the Tempelhof Studios in Berlin. The film was released on 6 October 1922.

== Cast ==
- Asta Nielsen as Vanina
- Paul Wegener as Gouverneur von Turin
- Paul Hartmann as Octavio
- Albrecht Viktor Blum as Adjutant des Gouverneurs
- Bernhard Goetzke as the Priest
- Raoul Lange as the Hangman

== Bibliography ==
- Eric Rentschler. German Film & Literature. Routledge, 2013.
