= Alexei Davidov =

Russian composer

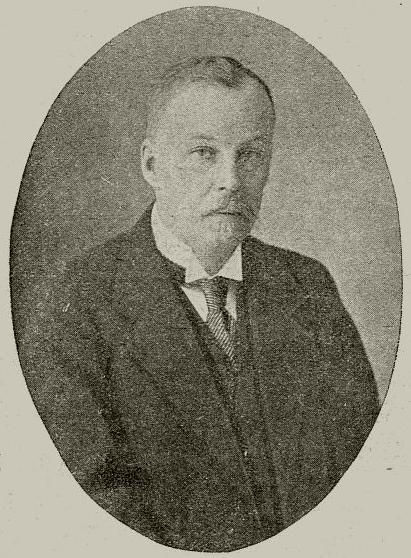
- Alexei Davidov
- Born: August 23, 1867; Moscow
- Died: March 6, 1940 (aged 72); Berlin
- Occupations: Musician, businessman
- Children: 3

Alexei Augustovich Davidov (Russian: Алексей Августович Давидов) (1867–1940) was a Russian cellist and composer, and also a banker, industrialist, and businessman.

Davidov was born in Moscow on August 23, 1867, the son of mathematician and educator August Davidov originally from Courland. His uncle Karl Davidov was a cellist and composer, and head of the Saint Petersburg Conservatory.

In 1891 Davidov was graduated from the Faculty of Mathematics and Physics of the University of Saint Petersburg and also from the Saint Petersburg Conservatory with a concentration in cello and composition.

Davidov was a founder and member (from 1894) of the Saint Petersburg Music Society (Russian: Петербургского общества музыкальных собраний), and in 1896 and 1897 its chairman. He participated in the staging of the operas The Maid of Pskov and Boris Godunov.

Davidov served in the Special Office for Credit in the Ministry of Finance and from the late 1890s was a member of the board of trustees of the Saint Petersburg International Commercial Bank. He was head of the Commercial Bank of Saint Petersburg from 1909 to 1917, and was a member or chairman of boards of many companies with which the bank was involved, engaged in gold mining, coal mining, machinery manufacturing, and other industries. He was a board member of the Electric Lighting Company (formed in 1886) and that company's Electric Power Division, which built power plants in Baku.

As head of the Commercial Bank, and working jointly with the Russo-Asiatic Bank, Davidov participated in the creation of various monopolies.

Davidov was a member of the board of the Saint Petersburg Stock Exchange and, from 1913, a state councilor (a civilian rank equivalent to the military rank of brigadier general).

After the Russian Revolution of 1917, Davidov fled to exile in Germany. He became a Freemason on February 24, 1922, and died in Berlin on March 6, 1940.

Davidov was married twice, first (in 1895) to the Georgian noblewoman Tamara Eristova. His second wife was the Mariinsky Theatre ballerina Eugenie Platonovna Eduardova. He had three children, Yuri (born 1897), Cyrus (born 1900), and Tatiana (born 1902).

== Works ==
- The Sunken Bell (Russian: Потонувший колокол), opera (1900)
- 5 Romances, Opus 3 written for voice and piano using the lyrics of Mariya Davydova
- 3 Romances, Opus 4
- Southern Night, Opus 7
- Asters, Opus 8 piece for cello, voice, and piano (1903)
- Fantasia, Op.11 dedicated to Alfred von Glehn
- Sister Beatrice (Russian: Сестра Биатриса), opera
- Sextet for Strings, Opus 12, dedicated to Davidov's brother Ivan
