= Carl Ebert =

German actor, stage director and arts administrator

Ebert (left) with Sir Thomas Beecham in the late 1950s

Carl Anton Charles Ebert (20 February 1887 – 14 May 1980) was a German actor, stage director and arts administrator.

Ebert's early career was as an actor, training under Max Reinhardt and becoming one of the leading actors in his native Germany during the 1920s. During that decade he was also appointed to administrative posts, both theatrical and academic. In 1929 he directed opera for the first time, and during the 1930s established a reputation as an operatic director in Germany and beyond. A strong opponent of Nazism, he left Germany in 1933 and did not return until 1945. Together with John Christie and the conductor Fritz Busch, Ebert created the Glyndebourne Festival Opera in 1934. Ebert remained its artistic director until 1959, though productions were suspended during the Second World War. In the 1930s and 1940s Ebert helped establish a national conservatory in Turkey, where he and his family lived from 1940 to 1947.

In his later years Ebert held administrative posts in Los Angeles and Berlin, and was a guest director at opera houses and festivals in Europe.

== Life and career ==
=== Early years ===
Ebert was born in Berlin, the son of a Polish father, Count Anton Potulicky, who was a government official in Berlin, and an Irish-American mother, Mary Collins, a music student. To keep it secret from her family that she had an illegitimate child, Mary Collins persuaded a fellow-student, Eileen Lawless, to be officially recorded as the boy's mother. He was given the name of Charles Lawless. His father rented rooms in the house of Wilhelm and Maria Ebert in Berlin. He persuaded the couple to take charge of his son. When the boy was seven years old the Eberts legally adopted him as their son. He was known as Charles Ebert from then until the First World War when he took a German form of his first name.

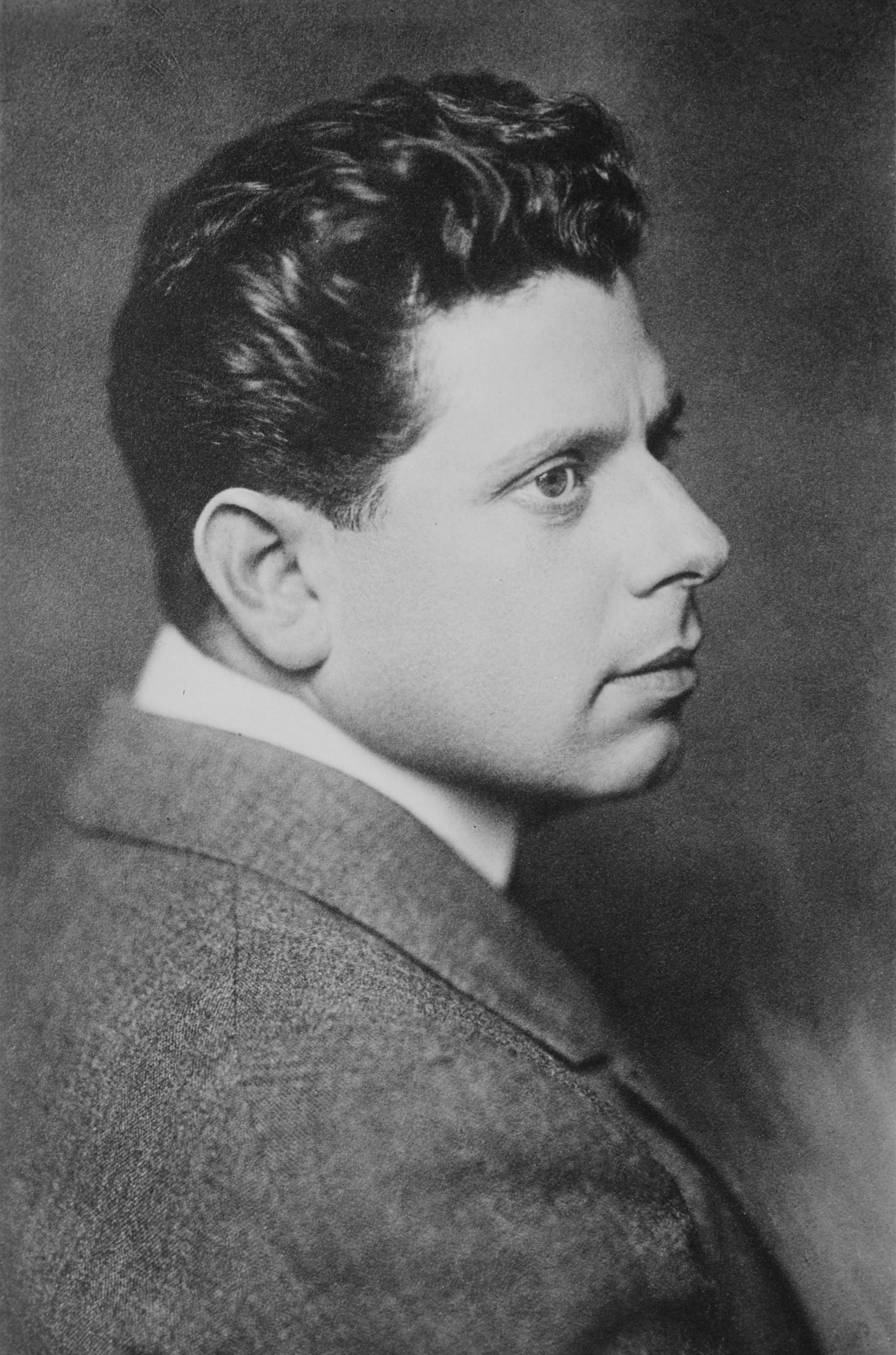
Max Reinhardt, Ebert's teacher

Ebert was educated in Berlin at the Friedrich Werder'sche Oberrealschule Berlin. From 1905 he trained for two years to be a banker, but in 1907 he gained a free place at Max Reinhardt's School of Dramatic Art in Berlin, and pursued a career in the theatre. While still a student Ebert played several major parts in Rheinhardt's productions at the Deutsches Theater, Berlin. While a member of Reinhardt's resident company at the Deutsches Theatre, Ebert married Lucie Splisgarth (1889–1981) in 1912. They had a daughter, who became a leading German actress and died in 1946, and a son, Peter, who became a stage director and theatre administrator. In 1914 Ebert was called up for military service, but after a year he was released at the instigation of the Schauspielhaus, Frankfurt, which was in urgent need of a leading actor. In the next seven years he played major roles for the Frankfurt company, and in 1919 he co-founded the Frankfurt Drama College. In 1923 he and his wife divorced. The following year she married the conductor Hans Oppenheim (later a colleague of Ebert at Glyndebourne), and Ebert married Gertrude Eck. All four remained on close terms with one another. Ebert's second marriage lasted for the rest of his life; he and Gertrude had two daughters and one son. Carl's grandson is Alex Ebert.

In 1922 Ebert returned to his native Berlin, where he joined the Berlin State Drama Theatre, continuing to build a reputation as one of Germany's leading actors. His greatest success was in the role of Leicester in Schiller's Mary Stuart. While continuing to act with the Berlin company he was appointed director and professor at the new State drama school at the Hochschule für Musik in Berlin, a post he held for two years. In 1927 he was appointed Generalintendant of the Landestheater Darmstadt, the first actor to hold the post. There he directed his first opera productions, Le nozze di Figaro and Otello (1929). For the next four years he refined his ideas for modernising the production of opera. In 1931 he was appointed to run the Städtische Oper in Berlin. Among the productions during his tenure were the world premiere of Weill's Die Bürgschaft in 1932, and a new production of Verdi's Un ballo in maschera in the same year, on which he collaborated for the first time with the conductor Fritz Busch.

=== Exile ===
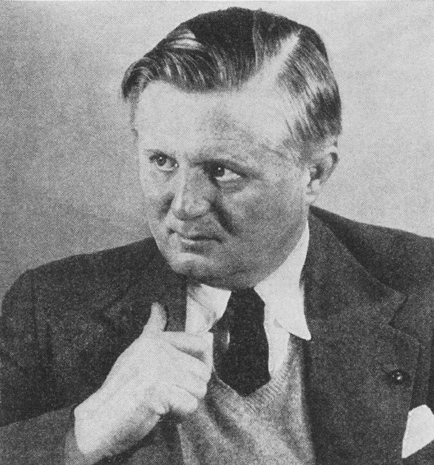
Fritz Busch, Ebert's musical partner at Glyndebourne

When the Nazis came to power in 1933, Hermann Göring, in his capacity as chief minister of Prussia, offered Ebert an expanded role, with control of all the opera houses of Berlin. Ebert, politically hostile to Nazism, preferred instead to leave the country and base himself and his family in Switzerland, where he rented a home in Lugano. He directed at the Schauspielhaus Zürich, the Maggio Musicale Fiorentino in Florence and the German opera season at the Teatro Colón in Buenos Aires. During four seasons at the Colón Ebert worked closely with Fritz Busch, who, like him, was a voluntary exile from Nazi Germany. Later Ebert was a guest director at La Scala, the Metropolitan Opera, the Vienna State Opera and the Salzburg Festival, among others.

In 1934 Busch accepted an invitation to take charge of the inaugural season of the Glyndebourne Festival Opera in a purpose-built opera house in the grounds of John Christie's country house in south east England. At Busch's suggestion Christie engaged Ebert as director. With Christie's backing, they revolutionised the staging of opera in Britain. The Times later said of Ebert:

What he accomplished at Glyndebourne in collaboration with Fritz Busch as conductor was to give a living demonstration that opera was a form of art sui generis, a Gesamtkunstwerk, and not, as English tradition had for a couple of centuries believed, a vehicle for star singers against tattered scenery and rough-and-ready stage management. When the curtain went up on Figaro at Glyndebourne in 1934 it was a revelation of the ideals of Monteverdi's dramma per musica 300 years earlier, which were more often observed in German than in Italian opera houses or at Covent Garden.

In The Observer, A H Fox Strangways wrote, "[T]his is the first time in this generation, and probably much longer, that opera has been done right under English management.

In 1936, at the instigation of Kemal Atatürk, Ebert founded the opera and drama school of the Ankara Conservatory. After five successful seasons Glyndebourne suspended productions for the duration of the Second World War. Both Busch and Ebert would have been liable to internment as enemy aliens had they remained in Britain, and Ebert moved his family to Ankara in 1940, remaining as head of the Department of the Performing Arts at the conservatory there until 1947.

=== Postwar ===
At the end of the Second World War the Allied powers occupying Germany invited Ebert to undertake a thorough tour of all parts of the country and report on the state of the theatre. He did so, but declined the offer that followed of a permanent theatre post in Germany. When Glyndebourne reopened after the war Ebert and Busch returned, and their productions continued to set high standards. Ebert remained as artistic director until retiring in 1959.

In 1948 Ebert created the opera department of the University of Southern California, Los Angeles of which he was professor and head until 1954. From this grew a professional company, the Guild Opera Company of Los Angeles, of which he was general director from 1950 to 1954. During this period he took American citizenship. In 1954 he finally returned to a permanent post in Germany, resuming his former position in charge of the Städtische Oper, Berlin. In 1961 he supervised the rebuilding and directed the opening production of the company's new opera house in Berlin, the Deutsche Oper, after which he retired.

Ebert continued to accept invitations to work as a guest director with Glyndebourne (until 1963), Zürich and the Wexford Festival (until 1965), and Berlin (until 1967). In 1965 and 1967 he gave masterclasses, televised by the BBC.

Ebert retired to California, where he died in Santa Monica at the age of 93.

== Selected filmography ==
- The Living Dead (1919)
- The Closed Chain (1920)
- The Bull of Olivera (1921)
- Nora (1923)
- Earth Spirit (1923)
- Living Buddhas (1925)
- The Adventures of Sybil Brent (1925)
- His Toughest Case (1926)
