= Hans von Zedlitz =

German actor

- Born: 9 August 1890; Berlin, German Empire
- Died: August 1948 (aged 57–58); Solothurn, Switzerland
- Occupation: Actor
- Years active: 1919-1936 (film)

Hans von Zedlitz (1890–1948) was a German film actor.

== Selected filmography ==
- The Living Dead (1919)
- Dancer of Death (1920)
- The Last Waltz (1934)
- Just Once a Great Lady (1934)
- Hard Luck Mary (1934)
- A Night of Change (1935)
- She and the Three (1935)

== Bibliography ==
- Waldman, Harry. Nazi Films In America, 1933-1942. McFarland & Co, 2008.
