= The Pied Piper of Hamelin (1918 film) =

- German film poster
- German: Der Rattenfänger von Hameln
- Directed by: Paul Wegener
- Written by: Paul Wegener
- Based on: Pied Piper of Hamelin
- Produced by: Paul Davidson
- Starring: Paul Wegener; Lyda Salmonova; Wilhelm Diegelmann
- Cinematography: Frederik Fuglsang
- Production company: PAGU
- Distributed by: UFA
- Release date: 19 December 1918
- Running time: 64 minutes
- Country: Germany
- Languages: Silent; German intertitles

The Pied Piper of Hamelin (German: Der Rattenfänger von Hameln) is a 1918 German silent drama film directed by and starring Paul Wegener and also featuring Lyda Salmonova and Wilhelm Diegelmann. It is based on the legendary story of the Pied Piper of Hamelin.

It was shot at the Tempelhof Studios and on location around Bautzen and Hildesheim. The film's sets were designed by the art director Rochus Gliese. The animator Lotte Reiniger worked on the design of the film's intertitles.

It premièred at the Union-Theater am Nollendorfplatz on 19 December 1918.

== Cast ==
- Paul Wegener as Fremder Spielmann
- Lyda Salmonova as Ursula
- Clemens Kaufung as Schinderknecht
- Wilhelm Diegelmann as mayor
- Frida Richard
- Elsa Wagner as Weib des Bürgermeister
- Armin Schweizer as Magerer Ratsherr
- Jakob Tiedtke as Ratsapotheker
- Märte Rassow as Märte
- Hans Sturm as Henker
