= Lyda Salmonova =

Czech actress

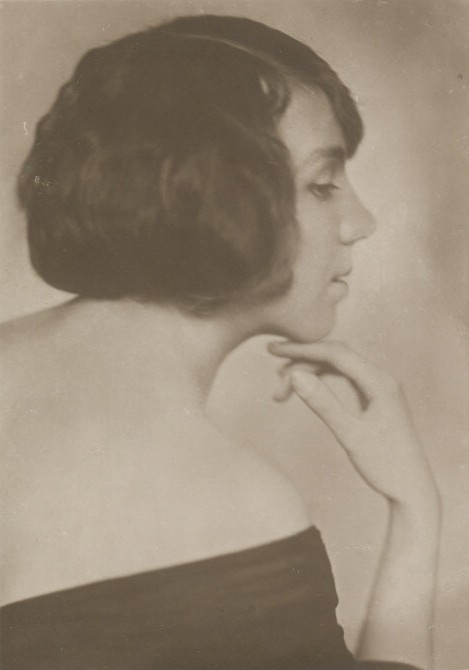
- Photograph by Rudolf Dührkoop
- Born: Ludmila Vilemina Anna Salmonova; 14 July 1889; Prague, Bohemia, Austria-Hungary
- Died: 7 November 1968 (aged 79); Prague, Czechoslovakia
- Years active: 1913–1923
- Spouse(s): Paul Wegener (divorced, remarried until his death in 1948)
- Children: 1

Lyda Salmonova (born Ludmila Vilemina Anna Salmonova; 14 July 1889 – 7 November 1968) was a Czech stage and film actress who appeared primarily in German films. She was married to the actor Paul Wegener and appeared alongside him in a number of films.

== Selected filmography ==
- The Student of Prague (1913)
- The Golem (1915)
- Rübezahl's Wedding (1916)
- The Yogi (1916)
- Hans Trutz in the Land of Plenty (1917)
- The Pied Piper of Hamelin (1918)
- The Foreign Prince (1918)
- The Galley Slave (1919)
- Malaria (1919)
- The Dancer Barberina (1920)
- The Golem: How He Came into the World (1920)
- The Hunchback and the Dancer (1920)
- Burning Country (1921)
- Wandering Souls (1921)
- Monna Vanna (1922)
- Lucrezia Borgia (1922)
- The Loves of Pharaoh (1922)
- The Love Nest (1922)
- The Island of Tears (1923)

== Bibliography ==
- Prawer, S.S. Between Two Worlds: The Jewish Presence in German and Austrian Film, 1910–1933. Berghahn Books, 2007.
