= Paul Wegener =

German actor, writer, and film director

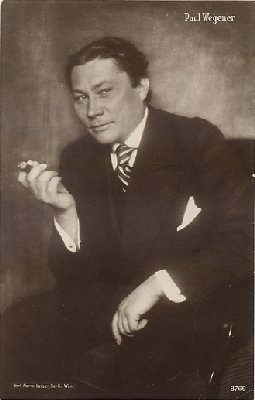
- Wegener in 1916
- Born: 11 December 1874; Arnoldsdorf, Province of Prussia, German Empire
- Died: 13 September 1948 (aged 73); Berlin, Allied-occupied Germany
- Occupation: Actor
- Spouse(s): Lyda Salmonova (divorced, remarried); Greta Schröder (m.1924, divorced)
- Children: 1
- Relatives: Alfred Wegener (cousin); Kurt Wegener (cousin)

Paul Wegener (11 December 1874 – 13 September 1948) was a German actor, writer, and film director known for his pioneering role in German expressionist cinema.

== Acting career ==
At the age of 20, Wegener decided to end his law studies and concentrate on acting, touring the provinces before joining Max Reinhardt's acting troupe in 1906. In 1912, he turned to the new medium of motion pictures and appeared in the 1913 version of The Student of Prague. It was while making this film that he first heard the old Jewish legend of the Golem and proceeded to adapt the story to film, co-directing and co-writing the script with Henrik Galeen. His first version of the tale The Golem (1915, now lost) was a success and firmly established Wegener's reputation. In 1917, he made a parody of the story called Der Golem und die Tänzerin, but it was his reworking of the tale, The Golem: How He Came into the World (1920) which stands as one of the classics of German cinema and helped to cement Wegener's place in cinematic history.

Another of his early films was Der Yoghi (1916), in which he played the role of a yogi and young inventor, and which provided him with the opportunity to accommodate three of his interests, trick photography (it was one of the first films to feature invisibility), the supernatural and Eastern mysticism.

In 1926, he appeared in his only Hollywood film, Rex Ingram's The Magician, in which he played the Aleister Crowley-esque Oliver Haddo in an adaptation of Somerset Maugham's story, followed by The Strange Case of Captain Ramper in 1927. In 1928, he starred alongside Brigitte Helm in his old collaborator Henrik Galeen's adaptation of Hanns Heinz Ewers' Alraune, playing the Frankenstein-like Professor ten Brinken.

In 1932, Wegener made his sound debut in Richard Oswald's black comedy/horror film Unheimliche Geschichten, in which he made fun of himself as well as the whole expressionist movie genre.

=== Life under the Nazi regime ===
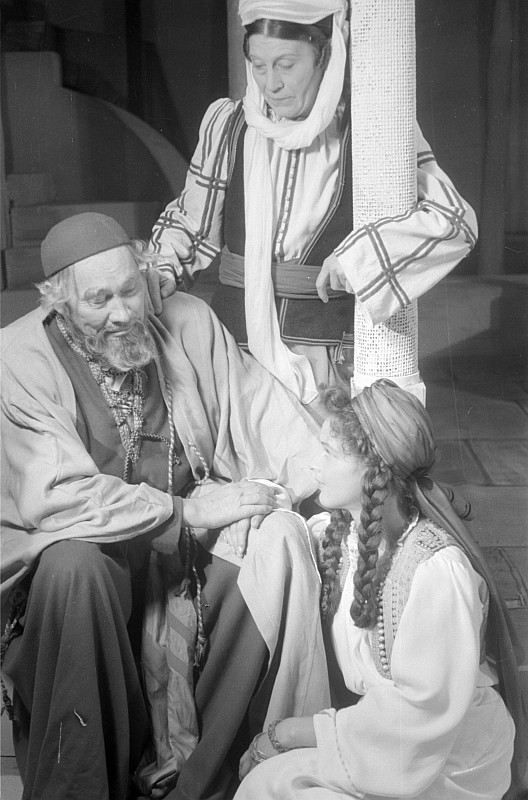
Wegener acting as Nathan the Wise with Gerda Müller (standing) and Agathe Poschmann in Berlin in September 1945

When in 1933 the Nazis came to power, theatre companies were disbanded and many of the actors and directors were arrested, persecuted or exiled. However Wegener became an actor of the state and appeared in Nazi propaganda films such as Mein Leben für Irland in 1941 and Kolberg, a 1944–45 propaganda film epic about the Napoleonic Wars. As the war closed Wegener was one of the first to rebuild cultural life in Berlin. He appeared in the title role in a production of Lessing's "Nathan the Wise" at the Deutsches Theater in Berlin in September 1945. Despite ill health, he became president of an organization to improve standards for its inhabitants.

== Personal life ==
He was married six times, thirdly and sixthly to the actress Lyda Salmonova (his co-star on several occasions), who became his widow. His fourth wife was Greta Schröder (previously married to the dancer Ernst Matray), who had portrayed the leading lady in F.W. Murnau's Nosferatu (1922). The geographer Alfred Wegener and the meteorologist Kurt Wegener were his cousins, and the physicist Prof. Peter P. Wegener was his son.

== Late career and death ==
Wegener's last film was Der Grosse Mandarin (1948). In July 1948 he reprised his old role as Nathan the Wise at the Deutschen Theatre, but in the very first scene he collapsed and the curtain was brought down. Two months later, on 13 September 1948, he died in his sleep.

== Selected filmography ==
=== Actor ===
- The Student of Prague (1913)
- The Golem (1915) [Lost film, only fragments survive]
- The Golem and the Dancing Girl (1917) [Lost film]
- Rübezahl's Wedding (1916)
- The Yogi (1916)
- Hans Trutz in the Land of Plenty (1917)
- The Pied Piper of Hamelin (1918)
- The Foreign Prince (1918)
- The Galley Slave (1919)
- Figures of the Night (1920)
- Sumurun (1920)
- The Golem: How He Came into the World (1920).
- Roswolsky's Mistress (1921)
- Loves of Pharaoh (1922)
- A Dying Nation (1922)
- The Love Nest (1922)
- Monna Vanna (1922)
- Lucrezia Borgia (1922)
- Vanina (1922)
- The Treasure of Gesine Jacobsen (1923)
- The Island of Tears (1923)
- Living Buddhas (1925)
- The Magician (1926)
- The Strange Case of Captain Ramper (1927)
- Queen of the Boulevards (1927)
- Poor Little Sif (1927)
- Svengali (1927)
- The Weavers (1927)
- World Without Weapons (1927)
- Alraune (1928) co-starring Brigitte Helm
- Unheimliche Geschichten (1932)
- Marshal Forwards (1932)
- The Secret of Johann Orth (1932)
- Inge and the Millions (1933)
- ... nur ein Komödiant (1935)
- The Man with the Paw (1935)
- Secret Mission (1938)
- The Right to Love (1939)
- Twilight (1940)
- My Life for Ireland (1941)
- The Girl from Fano (1941)
- Diesel (1942)
- Wedding in Barenhof (1942)
- Kolberg (1945)
- The Great Mandarin (1949)
- Eyes of Love (1951)

=== Director ===
- The Student of Prague (1913)
- The Golem (1915) [Lost film]
- Rübezahl's Wedding (1916)
- The Yogi (1916)
- The Golem and the Dancing Girl (1917) [Lost film]
- Hans Trutz in the Land of Plenty (1917)
- The Foreign Prince (1918)
- The Pied Piper of Hamelin (1918)
- The Galley Slave (1919)
- The Golem: How He Came into the World (1920)
- Living Buddhas (1925)
- A Man Wants to Get to Germany (1934)
- The Girlfriend of a Big Man (1934)
- Augustus the Strong (1936)
- The Hour of Temptation (1936)
- Moscow-Shanghai (1936)
