= 33rd Berlin International Film Festival =

1983 film festival in West Berlin, Germany

- Festival poster
- Opening film: Tootsie
- Location: West Berlin, Germany
- Founded: 1951
- Awards: Golden Bear: Ascendancy; La colmena
- No. of films: 330 films
- Festival date: 18 February – 1 March 1983
- Website: http://www.berlinale.de

Berlin International Film Festival chronology
- 34th 32nd

The 33rd annual Berlin International Film Festival was held from 18 February to 1 March 1983. The festival opened with the out of competition film Tootsie, by Sydney Pollack.

The Golden Bear was jointly awarded to Ascendancy, directed by Edward Bennett, and La colmena, directed by Mario Camus.

The retrospective titled Exile. Six Actors from Germany was dedicated to German or Austrian actors Wolfgang Zilzer, Curt Bois, Dolly Haas, Francis Lederer, Elisabeth Bergner and Hertha Thiele, who were forced to leave Germany after the 1930s rise of the Nazi regime.

== Juries ==
=== Main Competition ===
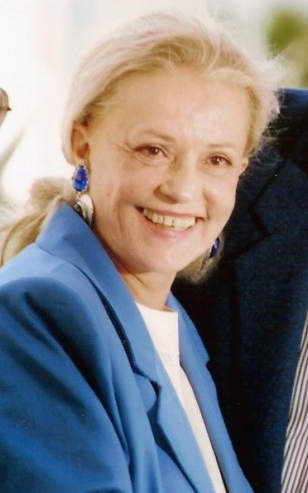
Jeanne Moreau, Jury President

The following people were announced as being on the jury for the festival:

- Jeanne Moreau, French actress - Jury President
- Alex Bänninger, Swiss publicist and writer
- Franco Brusati, Italian playwright and filmmaker
- Elem Klimov, Soviet filmmaker
- Ursula Ludwig, West-German actress
- Kurt Maetzig, East-German filmmaker
- Joseph L. Mankiewicz, American filmmaker and producer
- Franz Seitz, West-German filmmaker and producer
- Huang Zongjiang, Chinese writer

== Official Sections ==
=== Main Competition ===
The following films were in competition for the Golden Bear:

English title	Original title	Director(s)	Production Country
Ascendancy		Edward Bennett	United Kingdom
A Season in Hakkari	Hakkâri'de Bir Mevsim	Erden Kıral	Turkey
La Belle captive		Alain Robbe-Grillet	France
Cap Canaille		Juliet Berto, Jean-Henri Roger	France
La colmena		Mario Camus	Spain
Der er et yndigt land		Morten Arnfred	Denmark
Der Stille Ozean		Xaver Schwarzenberger	Austria
Dies rigorose Leben		Vadim Glowna	West Germany
The Ghost	Das Gespenst	Herbert Achternbusch	West Germany
Go Ahead, Brazil!	Pra Frente, Brasil	Roberto Farias	Brazil
Hécate		Daniel Schmid	Switzerland
Himala		Ishmael Bernal	Philippines
Incomplete Eclipse	Neúplné zatmení	Jaromil Jireš	Czechoslovakia
In the White City	Dans la ville blanche	Alain Tanner	Switzerland
Love by Request	Влюблён по собственному желанию	Sergey Mikaelyan	Soviet Union
The Mission	فرستاده	Parviz Sayyad	United States, West Germany
Pauline at the Beach	Pauline à la plage	Éric Rohmer	France
Sheer Madness	Heller Wahn	Margarethe von Trotta	West Germany
Strange Friends	陌生的朋友	Lei Xu	China
That Championship Season		Jason Miller	United States
Utopia		Sohrab Shahid-Saless	West Germany
Via degli specchi		Giovanna Gagliardo	Italy
The Vulture	Dögkeselyű	Ferenc András	Hungary
Yaju-deka	野獣刑事	Eiichi Kudo	Japan

=== Out of competition ===
- De vlaschaard, directed by Jan Gruyaert (Belgium, Netherlands)
- Echtzeit, directed by Hellmuth Costard and Jürgen Ebert (West Germany)
- Das Gespenst, directed by Herbert Achternbusch (West Germany)
- In the King of Prussia, directed by Emile de Antonio (United States)
- Class Enemy, directed by Peter Stein (West Germany)
- Koyaanisqatsi, directed by Godfrey Reggio (United States)
- War and Peace, directed by Stefan Aust, Axel Engstfeld, Alexander Kluge and Volker Schlöndorff (West Germany)
- Sans Soleil, directed by Chris Marker (France)
- Tootsie, directed by Sydney Pollack (United States)

=== Retrospective ===
1983 Retrospective poster, titled Exil. Sechs Schauspieler aus Deutschland ("Exile. Six Actors from Germany")

The following films were shown in the retrospective "Exile. Six Actors from Germany":

English title	Original title	Director(s)	Country
Unholy Love	Alraune	Henrik Galeen	Germany
Anna and Elizabeth	Anna und Elisabeth	Frank Wisbar	Germany
A Private Life		Mikhail Bogin	United States
Ariane		Paul Czinner	Germany
Boycott	Boykott	Robert Land	Germany
Broken Blossoms		John Brahm	United Kingdom
Caught		Max Ophüls	United States
Confessions of a Nazi Spy		Anatole Litvak	United States
The Boat Is Full	Das Boot ist voll	Markus Imhoof	Switzerland
The Awakening of Woman	Das Erwachen des Weibes	Fred Sauer	Germany
The Ugly Girl	Das häßliche Mädchen	Hermann Kosterlitz	Germany
The Prince of Pappenheim	Der Fürst von Pappenheim	Richard Eichberg	Germany
The Page from the Dalmasse Hotel	Der Page vom Dalmasse-Hotel	Victor Janson	Germany
The Pentecost Outing	Der Pfingstausflug	Michael Günther	West Germany
Dreaming Lips	Der träumende Mund	Paul Czinner	Germany
Pandora's Box	Die Büchse der Pandora	Georg Wilhelm Pabst	Germany
The Incorrigible Barbara	Die unverbesserliche Barbara	Lothar Warneke	East Germany
The Wonderful Lies of Nina Petrovna	Die wunderbare Lüge der Nina Petrowna	Hanns Schwarz	Germany
Dreaming Lips		Paul Czinner	United Kingdom
Ein Polterabend		Curt Bois	East Germany
A Tremendously Rich Man	Ein steinreicher Mann	Steve Sekely	Germany
Enemy of Women		Alfred Zeisler	United States
Miss Else	Fräulein Else	Paul Czinner	Germany
Herr Puntila and His Servant Matti	Herr Puntila und sein Knecht Matti	Alberto Cavalcanti	Austria
Hitler's Madman		Douglas Sirk	United States
Hotel Berlin		Peter Godfrey	United States
I Confess		Alfred Hitchcock	United States
The Island on the Lake	Insel im See	Wolfgang Münstermann	East Germany
Little Girl, Great Fortune	Kleines Mädel – großes Glück	E. W. Emo	Germany
Kuhle Wampe or Who Owns the World?	Kuhle Wampe oder Wem gehört die Welt	Slatan Dudow	Germany
Love's Command	Liebeskommando	Géza von Bolváry	Germany
Girls in Uniform	Mädchen in Uniform	Leontine Sagan	Germany
Mutterliebe		(unknown)	Germany
Husbands or Lovers	Nju – Eine unverstandene Frau	Paul Czinner	Germany
Raid in St. Pauli	Razzia in Sankt Pauli	Werner Hochbaum	Germany
Ripening Youth	Reifende Jugend	Carl Froelich	Germany
Scampolo	Scampolo, ein Kind der Straße	Hans Steinhoff	Germany, Austria
Such Is Life	Takový je život	Carl Junghans	Czechoslovakia
Stolen Life		Paul Czinner	United Kingdom
The Diary of a Chambermaid		Jean Renoir	United States
The Diary of a Chambermaid		Richard Oswald	United States
The Man I Married		Irving Pichel	United States
The Pursuit of Happiness		Alexander Hall	United States
Voice in the Wind		Arthur Ripley	United States
Escape	Zuflucht	Carl Froelich	Germany

== Official Awards ==
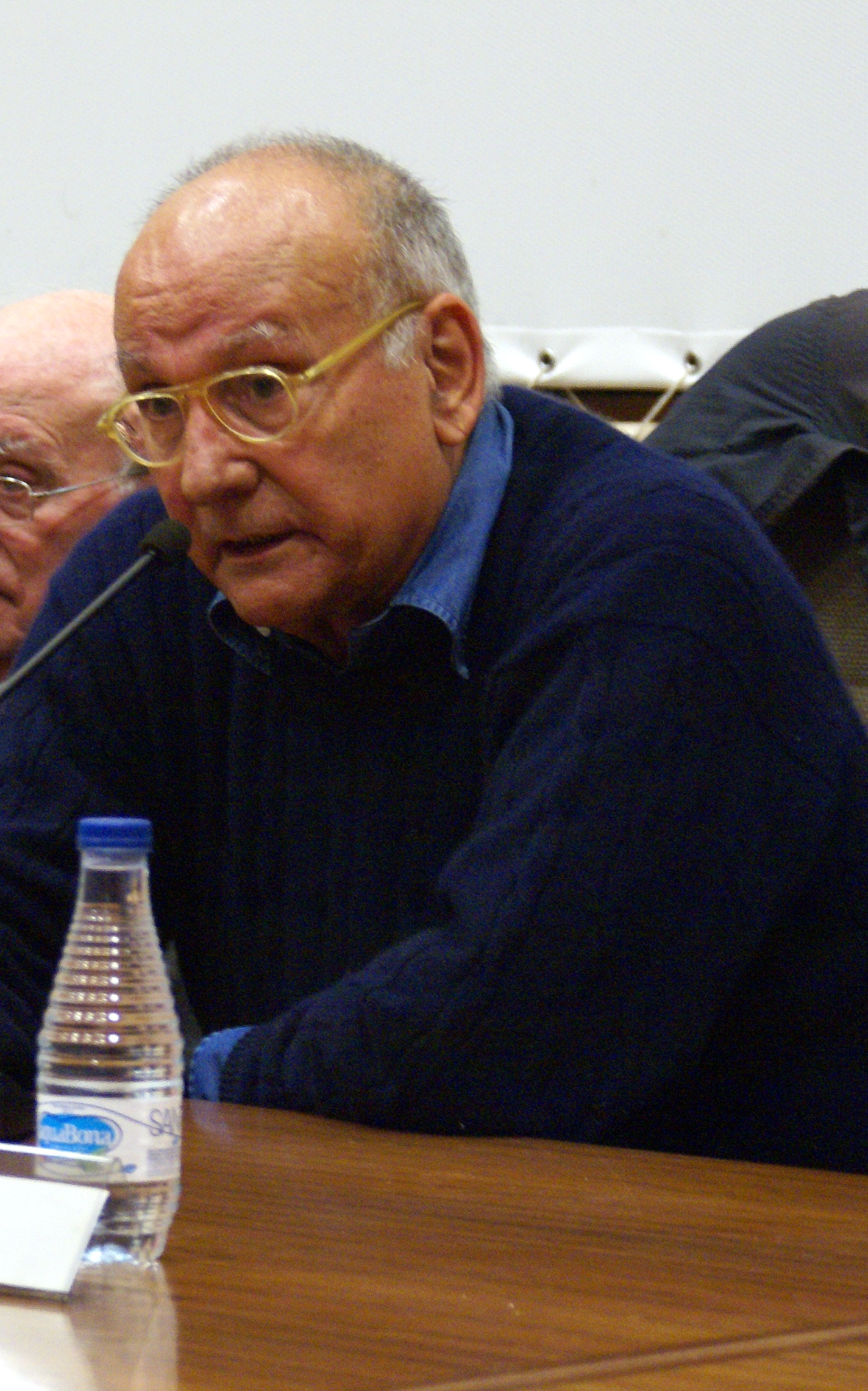
Mario Camus, one of the winners of the Golden Bear at the event

The following prizes were awarded by the Jury:

- Golden Bear:
  - Ascendancy by Edward Bennett
  - La colmena by Mario Camus
- Silver Bear – Special Jury Prize: A Season in Hakkari by Erden Kıral
- Silver Bear for Best Director: Éric Rohmer for Pauline at the Beach
- Silver Bear for Best Actress: Yevgeniya Glushenko for Love by Request
- Silver Bear for Best Actor: Bruce Dern for That Championship Season
- Silver Bear for an outstanding single achievement: Xaver Schwarzenberger for Der stille Ozean
- Honourable Mention:
  - Mo sheng de peng you by Lei Xu
  - Der er et yndigt land by Morten Arnfred
  - Dies rigorose Leben by Vadim Glowna

== Independent Awards ==
=== FIPRESCI Award ===
- Pauline at the Beach by Éric Rohmer
- A Season in Hakkari by Erden Kıral
