= The Loves of Ariane =

1931 film

- Directed by: Paul Czinner
- Written by: Paul Czinner; Carl Mayer
- Based on: Ariane by Claude Anet
- Produced by: Seymour Nebenzahl
- Starring: Elisabeth Bergner; Percy Marmont; Warwick Ward
- Production company: Nero Film
- Distributed by: Universal Pictures
- Release date: 31 January 1931
- Running time: 70 minutes
- Country: United Kingdom
- Language: English

The Loves of Ariane is a 1931 British-German drama film directed by Paul Czinner starring Elisabeth Bergner, Charles Carson and Percy Marmont. Shot in Germany, it was an English-language version of the 1931 German film Ariane. It was based on the 1920 novel Ariane, jeune fille russe by Claude Anet.

== Synopsis ==
A young woman falls in love while studying at university.

== Cast ==
- Elisabeth Bergner as Ariane
- Percy Marmont as Anthony Fraser
- Warwick Ward as Doctor
- Charles Carson as Professor
- Joan Matheson as Olga
- Oriel Ross as Duchess
- Elizabeth Vaughan as Waravara

== Bibliography ==
- Wood, Linda. British Films, 1927-1939. British Film Institute, 1986.
