= Dreaming Lips =

Dreaming Lips (German:Der träumende Mund) may refer to:

- Dreaming Lips (1932 film), a French-German film directed by Paul Czinner
- Dreaming Lips (1937 film), a British remake directed by Paul Czinner
- Dreaming Lips (1953 film), a West German remake directed by Josef von Báky
