= Ariane, jeune fille russe =

Ariane, jeune fille russe may refer to:

- Ariane, jeune fille russe (novel), a 1920 novel by Claude Anet
- Ariane, jeune fille russe (film), a 1931 French-German film adaptation
