= Mélo (play) =

Mélo is a play in three acts by Henri Bernstein. It was first staged in France in 1929 at the Théâtre du Gymnase Marie-Bell in a production starring the actor Charles Boyer. It was staged on Broadway at the Ethel Barrymore Theatre where it opened on April 16, 1931. The Broadway production used an English-language translation of Bernstein's play by Arthur Pollock.

== Plot ==
Pierre Belcroix and Marcel Blanc are violinists and lifelong friends living in Paris in the 1920s. While Marcel has become famous and Pierre has not, both are happy with their lives. Pierre is happily married to Romaine, a stylish young flapper. However, Marcel meets and falls in love with her, which Pierre little suspects. Romaine carries on her affair with Marcel, even as Pierre falls ill, which she may have deliberately exacerbated with her treatment in order to murder him. Soon Marcel goes on a concert tour, and Romaine abandons Pierre for a romantic tryst. When Marcel returns, Romaine reconsiders the affair, and realizes that she loves both Pierre and Marcel. She decides that she does not want to hurt either her husband or her lover, and as no other solution seems possible, she commits suicide. Three years later, Pierre visits Marcel to seek the truth, and Marcel tells him that no illicit affair occurred, thereby honoring her memory.

== Film adaptations ==
It was first filmed in 1932 by Paul Czinner in two versions: in Germany as Dreaming Lips and in France as Mélo. Czinner later remade the film in 1937 in Britain. Another German version titled Dreaming Lips was released in 1953.

The 1986 French film based on the play was directed by Alain Resnais, and starred Fanny Ardant, André Dussollier, Sabine Azéma and Pierre Arditi. It won the César Award for Best Actress and Best Supporting Actor, and was nominated for Best Film, Best Actor, Best Director, Best Cinematography, Best Costume Design and Best Production Design.
