= Christian Friedrich, Baron Stockmar =

German physician and statesman (1787-1863)

The Baron Stockmar
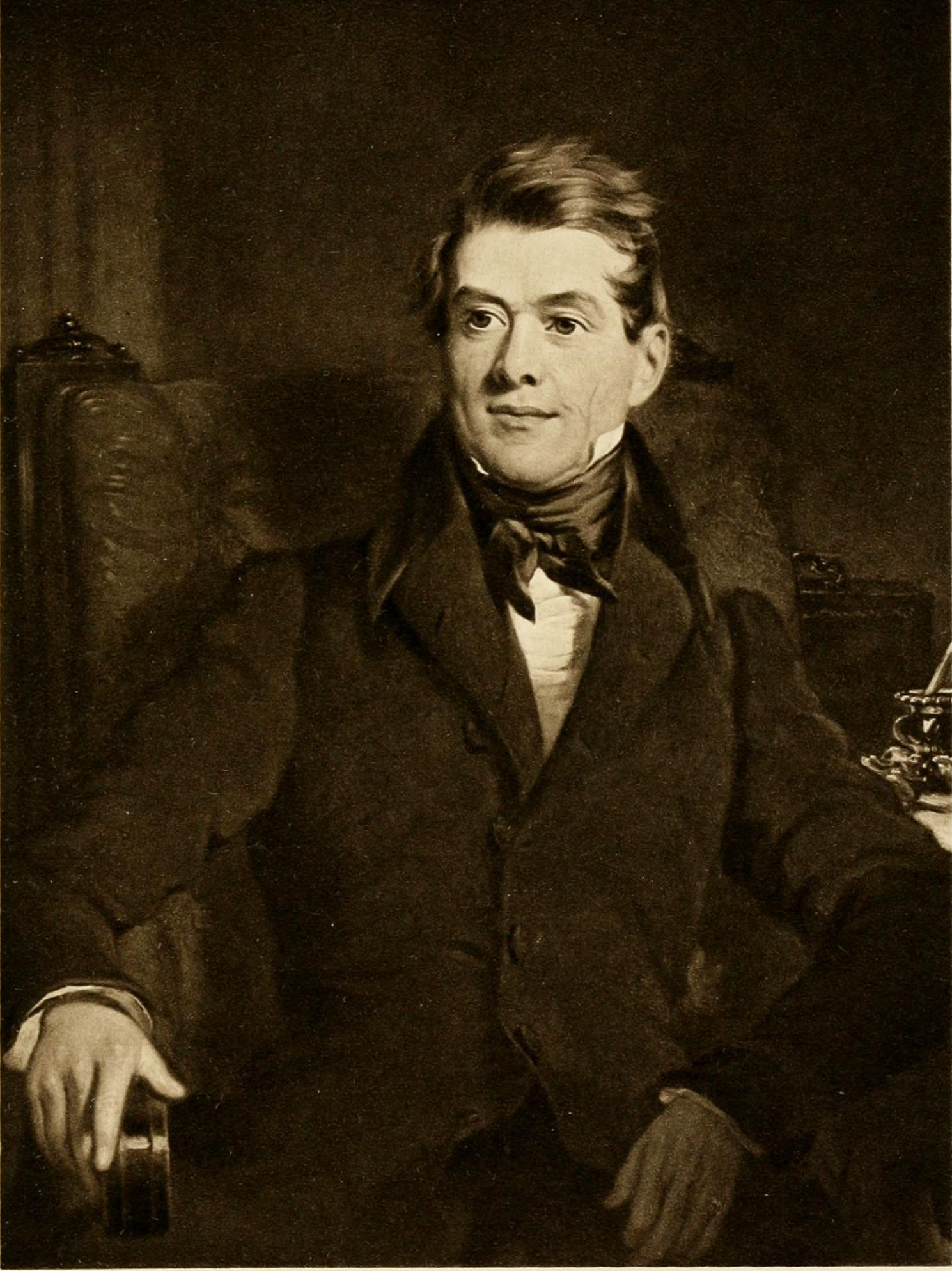
- Known for: Advisor to Queen Victoria and King Leopold
- Born: 22 August 1787; Coburg, Saxe-Coburg-Saalfeld, Holy Roman Empire
- Died: 9 July 1863 (aged 75); Coburg, Saxe-Coburg and Gotha, German Confederation

Christian Friedrich Freiherr von Stockmar (22 August 1787 – 9 July 1863) was a German medical doctor and statesman, who was a leading player in the affairs of the United Kingdom under Queen Victoria.

== Early life and education ==
Baron Stockmar was born in Coburg, Germany, of German parentage and Swedish descent, as the son of Johann Ernst Gotthelf Stockmar (1760–1825) and his wife, Johanna Christiane Sommer. He was educated as a physician, and became the personal physician of Prince Leopold of Saxe-Coburg-Gotha in 1816 at the time of Leopold's marriage to Princess Charlotte of the United Kingdom, the only child of the Prince Regent, the future King George IV.

== In service of King Leopold ==
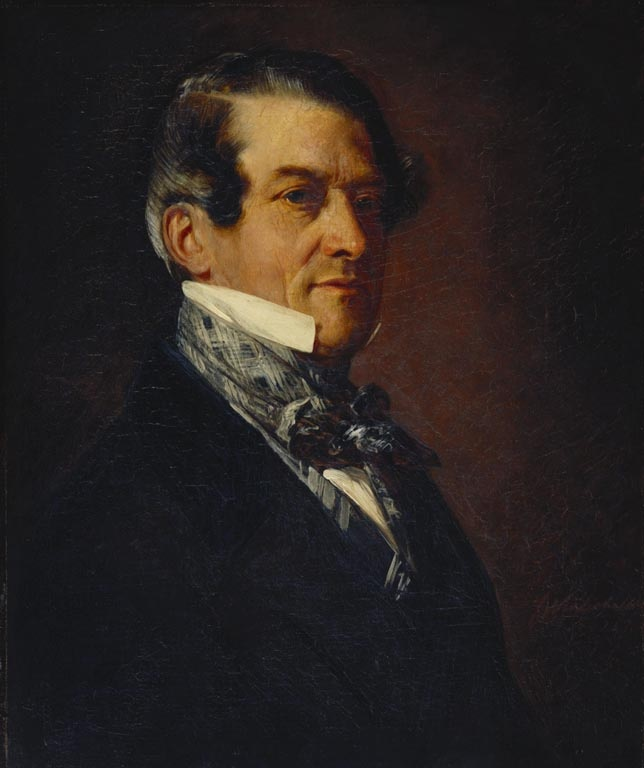
The Baron Stockmar

Charlotte died giving birth to a stillborn son about a year later (had she lived, Leopold would have been Prince Consort of the United Kingdom), and Stockmar stayed in Leopold's service as his private secretary, comptroller of the household, and political advisor.

It is said that one of the services he provided was procuring a mistress for Leopold. He was not at all pleased when in 1828 one of his cousins, Caroline Bauer, an actress who bore a striking resemblance to Princess Charlotte, became the mistress of his master. She was brought over to England, together with her mother, but the affair did not last long and she returned to Germany and to the theater. After her death (and that of both King Leopold and Baron von Stockmar), her memoirs were published in which she claimed that she had contracted a morganatic marriage with Leopold and that she had received the title Countess of Montgomery. There has never been any evidence of such marriage, which furthermore was strongly denied by the son of the late Dr. von Stockmar.

After Leopold had briefly come under scrutiny for the position of King of the Greeks, he was made King of the Belgians in 1831. From then on, Stockmar took up residence in Coburg, continuing to advise Leopold. In 1837, he was sent by Leopold to serve as advisor to Queen Victoria: one of his first tasks was to brief her on whether Leopold's nephew, Prince Albert (later Prince Consort), was a suitable mate. After the marriage of Victoria and Albert, Stockmar became their unofficial counsellor, including in the education of Victoria's son and heir, the future King Edward VII, and intervened in several crises.

Stockmar's memoirs were published as Memoirs of Baron Stockmar.

== Ambassador to the German parliament ==
In 1848 he was made ambassador of the Duchy of Saxe-Coburg and Gotha to the parliament of the German Confederation.

His prominence in the United Kingdom's political circles led to resentment at what was seen to be Albert's (and, generally, German) intervention in the UK's affairs.

Stockmar was raised to the rank of baron by the King of Saxony. He died at Coburg.

== Marriage ==
In August 1821 he married his maternal cousin, Fanny Sommer (1800–1868); they had three children:

- Ernst Alfred Christian von Stockmar (1823–1886)
- Marie von Stockmar (1827–1856), married Hermann Theodor Hettner
- Carl August von Stockmar (1836–1909), married Baroness Anna von Haynau (1847–1904), great-granddaughter of William I, Elector of Hesse and his mistress Rosa Dorothea Ritter.

== Screen portrayals ==
- Paul Leyssac portrayed Baron Stockmar in Victoria the Great (1937)
- Noel Willman portrayed Baron Stockmar in Edward the Seventh (1975)
- David Suchet portrayed Baron Stockmar in Victoria & Albert (2001)
- Jesper Christensen portrayed Baron Stockmar in The Young Victoria (2009)

== Bibliography ==
- Crabitès, Pierre (1937). Victoria's Guardian Angel: A Study of Baron Stockmar. London: Routledge.
- Esher, Reginald B. B., ed. (1907). The Letters of Queen Victoria, a Selection from Her Majesty's Correspondence Between the Years 1837 and 1861. New York: Longmans, Green. 3 volumes.
- Grey, Charles (1867). The Early Years of His Royal Highness the Prince Consort (4th ed.). London: Smith, Elder and Company. pp. 174–236, 420–422.
- Hough, Richard (1996). Victoria and Albert. New York: St. Martin's Press. pp. 11–33, 79–84, 123–124. ISBN 978-0-312-30385-3.
- Martin, Theodore (1879). The Life of His Royal Highness the Prince Consort. Vol. the Second. New York: Appleton.
- Wangenheim, R. von (1996). Baron Stockmar: Eine coburgisch-englische Geschichte. Coburg 1996. (in German)
