= Love in the Afternoon (1957 film) =

1957 film by Billy Wilder

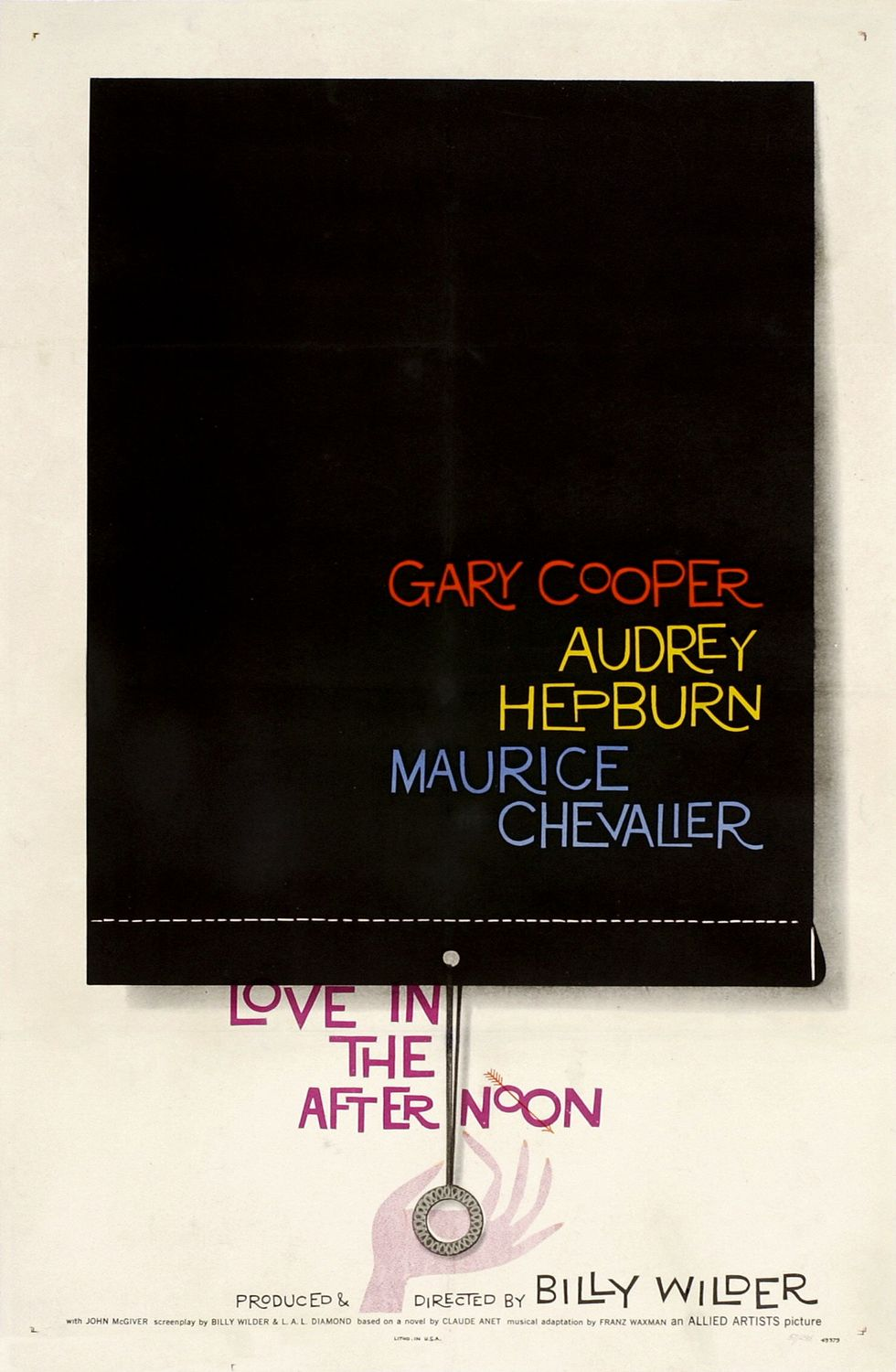
- Theatrical release poster by Saul Bass
- Directed by: Billy Wilder
- Screenplay by: Billy Wilder; I. A. L. Diamond
- Based on: Ariane, jeune fille russe 1924 novel by Claude Anet
- Produced by: Billy Wilder
- Starring: Gary Cooper; Audrey Hepburn; Maurice Chevalier
- Cinematography: William Mellor
- Edited by: Léonide Azar
- Music by: Franz Waxman
- Production company: Allied Artists Productions
- Distributed by: Allied Artists Pictures Corporation
- Release dates: May 29, 1957 (Paris); June 19, 1957 (Los Angeles); June 30, 1957 (United States)
- Running time: 124 or 130 minutes
- Country: United States
- Language: English
- Budget: $2.1 million
- Box office: $2 million (US and Canada rentals)

Theatrical trailer

Love in the Afternoon is a 1957 American romantic comedy film produced and directed by Billy Wilder, and starring Gary Cooper, Audrey Hepburn, and Maurice Chevalier. The screenplay by Wilder and I. A. L. Diamond is based on the 1920 Claude Anet novel Ariane, jeune fille russe (Ariane, Young Russian Girl). The story explores the relationship between a notorious middle-aged American playboy business magnate and the 20-something daughter of a private detective hired to investigate him. The supporting cast features John McGiver and Lise Bourdin.

== Plot ==
Young cello student Ariane Chavasse resides in Paris with her widowed father, Claude, a private detective who specializes in tracking unfaithful spouses. One day, she overhears him provide a client, "Monsieur X", proof of his wife's daily trysts with American business magnate Frank Flannagan in Suite 14 of the Paris Ritz. Monsieur X vows to shoot Flannagan that night. Claude remains calm, mainly sorry to lose business, as Flannagan is a well-known international playboy with a long history of casual affairs. When Ariane cannot get the Ritz to connect her to Flannagan by phone, and the police decline to intervene until after a crime has been committed, she decides to go to the hotel to warn him herself. Sneaking into his suite, she finds Flannagan dancing with Madame X and warns them about the husband's plan.

As promised, Monsieur X waits outside Flannagan's suite at the Ritz. He breaks in and finds Flannagan with Ariane as Madame X cautiously makes her escape via the outside ledge. After searching the room and conversing with the pair, Monsieur X apologizes for the misunderstanding and leaves. Intrigued by the mysterious girl, who reveals nothing about herself—not even her name—Flannagan tries to guess it from the letter "A" on her purse. When she still will not say, he resorts to calling her "thin girl". Lacking a romantic past but pretending to be a femme fatale to interest him, she soon falls for the much older man. She agrees to meet him the next afternoon, concealing her evening orchestra practice. Though unsure, she spends the evening waiting with him before his departure for the airport.

Ariane's father, having tried to shield her from his work's tawdry details, notices her mood change but does not realize it is linked to one of his cases.

A year later, Flannagan returns to Paris and the Ritz. Ariane, who has kept track of Flannagan's womanizing exploits through the news media, sees him at an opera while surveying the crowd from a balcony. She makes sure to cross his path in the lobby, and they start seeing each other again. When he asks questions about her past, she invents a list of imaginary past lovers based on her father's files, claiming Flannagan is her 20th. Flannagan gradually moves from amusement to jealousy at the prospect of comparisons, but remains unsure whether her stories are true. He later encounters a still-apologetic Monsieur X, who recommends Claude to him, and Flannagan hires Ariane's own father to investigate.

Claude quickly realizes that the mystery woman is Ariane. He visits Flannagan at the Ritz, reveals her name, and explains she fabricated her romantic history. Claude tells Flannagan that Ariane is his daughter and urges him to let her go, since she is serious and he is not seeking a serious relationship.

That afternoon, Ariane visits Flannagan, who is hastily packing, pretending to be leaving Paris for "two crazy Swedish twins" in Cannes. At the train station, both pretend not to care for each other, though Ariane quietly cries, blaming soot. As the train departs, she runs beside it, telling Flannagan she will soon travel with her many lovers. Her femme-fatale facade cracks, and she insists, "I'll be all right, I'll be all right." Flannagan changes his mind, sweeps her up in his arms onto the train before kissing her and calling her by her real name.

In a voice-over, Claude reveals that their "case" came before a judge in Cannes on August 24, and they are now serving a "life sentence" in New York City.

== Cast ==
- Gary Cooper as Frank Flannagan
- Audrey Hepburn as Ariane Chavasse
- Maurice Chevalier as Claude Chavasse
- John McGiver as Monsieur X
- Van Doude as Michel
- Lise Bourdin as Madame X
- Olga Valery as hotel guest with dog
- The Gypsies as themselves

== Music ==
Songs and music in the film include:

- "Fascination" by Fermo Dante Marchetti with lyrics (1905) by Maurice de Féraudy and English lyrics by Dick Manning; performed by the Gypsies
- "C'est si bon" by Henri Betti; lyrics by André Hornez; performed by the Gypsies
- "L'ame de Poètes" by Charles Trenet; performed by the Gypsies
- "Love in the Afternoon", "Ariane", and "Hot Paprika" by Matty Malneck

== Production ==
=== Development ===
Love in the Afternoon was the first of twelve screenplays by Billy Wilder and I. A. L. Diamond, who met when Wilder contacted Diamond after reading an article he had written for the Screen Writers Guild monthly magazine. The two men hit it off immediately, and Wilder suggested they collaborate on a project based on a German-language film he had co-written in the early 1930s. The script was based on the 1920 Claude Anet novel Ariane, jeune fille russe (Ariane, Young Russian Girl), which had been filmed as Scampolo (1928) and Scampolo, a Child of the Street (1932), the latter with a script co-written by Wilder. Wilder was inspired by a 1931 German adaptation of the novel, Ariane, directed by Paul Czinner.

=== Casting ===
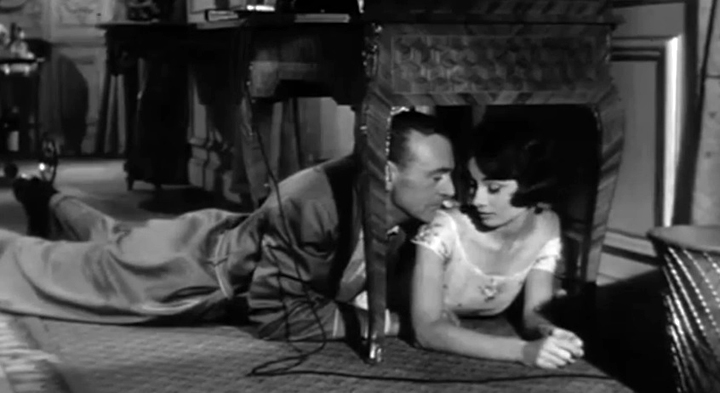
Cooper and Hepburn in Love in the Afternoon

Wilder's first choices for Frank Flannagan were Cary Grant and Yul Brynner. "It was a disappointment to me that [Grant] never said yes to any picture I offered him," Wilder later recalled. "He didn't explain why. He had very strong ideas about what parts he wanted". The director decided to cast Gary Cooper because they shared similar tastes and interests, and Wilder knew the actor would be good company during location filming in Paris. "They talked about food and wine and clothes and art," according to co-star Audrey Hepburn, Wilder's only choice for Ariane.

Talent agent Paul Kohner suggested Maurice Chevalier for the role of Claude Chavasse, and when asked if he was interested, the actor replied, "I would give the secret recipe for my grandmother's bouillabaisse to be in a Billy Wilder picture." Love in the Afternoon marked Chevalier's first non-singing role in a film since 1947. The film was also the American feature film debut of character actor John McGiver.

=== Filming ===
Wilder insisted on shooting the film on location in Paris. Outdoor locations included the Château of Vitry in the Yvelines; the Palais Garnier, home of the Paris Opera; and the Hôtel Ritz Paris. Interior scenes were filmed at the Studios de Boulogne. However, Cooper reportedly felt uncomfortable because this was his first time outside the United States. To cover over Cooper's performance and also to obscure "the lines and age in Cooper's face," Wilder photographed the actor's face in shadow and with "gauzy filters"; the camera was also often positioned behind Cooper's back.

For the American release of the film, Chevalier recorded an end-of-film narration to let audiences know that Ariane and Flannagan had married and were living in New York City. Although Wilder objected to the addition, he was forced to include it to forestall complaints that the relationship between the two was immoral.

=== Music ===
Music plays an important role in the film. A four-piece band of musicians called "The Gypsies" entertains Flannagan and his various lovers in his hotel suite, since Frank says he's "not much of a talker" and lets music create the romance. The Gypsies stick with Flannagan through thick and thin, serenading him as he drowns his sorrows in drink while listening to Ariane's recording of her long list of lovers, joining him in a Turkish bath, and following him to the train station.

Much of the prelude to the 1865 Richard Wagner opera Tristan und Isolde is heard during a lengthy sequence set in the Palais Garnier opera house, possibly conducted by Hans Knappertsbusch. Matty Malneck, Wilder's friend from their Paul Whiteman days in Vienna, wrote three songs for the film, including the title tune. Also heard are "C'est si bon" by Henri Betti, "L'ame Des Poètes" by Charles Trenet, and "Fascination", a 1932 song based on a European waltz, which is hummed repeatedly by Ariane. Haydn's Symphony No. 88 is also featured.

Malneck later wrote lyrics for "Fascination" and "Hot Paprika". "Fascination" became a hit for Chevalier and many other singers; "C'est si bon" was also recorded by numerous singers and became an international hit.

Johnny Mercer later wrote lyrics for "Love in the Afternoon". The song became a hit for Jerry Vale, among others.

== Release ==
Poster for the film's release in French-speaking markets

Produced at a cost of $2.1 million, the film was plagued by underfinancing. The debt Allied Artists incurred while making Friendly Persuasion prompted the studio to sell the distribution rights for Love in the Afternoon in Europe to raise more financing.

The film had its world premiere in Paris on May 29, 1957. It opened in Los Angeles on June 19, 1957, and in New York on August 23, 1957.

=== Box-office ===
The film was a commercial failure in the United States. It did not resonate with American audiences in part because Cooper looked too old to be having an affair with Hepburn's young character. Wilder himself admitted: "It was a flop. Why? Because I got Coop the week he suddenly got old." Allied Artists re-released the film in 1961 under the new title Fascination. However, in Europe, the film was a major success, released under the title Ariane.

== Reception ==
In his 1957 review, Bosley Crowther of The New York Times called the film a "grandly sophisticated romance ... in the great Lubitsch tradition" and added, "Like most of Lubitsch's chefs-d'oeuvre [masterpieces], it is a gossamer sort of thing, so far as a literary story and a substantial moral are concerned ... Mr. Wilder employs a distinctive style of subtle sophisticated slapstick to give the fizz to his brand of champagne ... Both the performers are up to it—archly, cryptically, beautifully. They are even up to a sentimental ending that is full of the mellowness of afternoon."

Wilder is often mentioned as Lubitsch's disciple. In his 2007 essay on the two directors for Stop Smiling magazine, Jonathan Rosenbaum wrote that Love in the Afternoon was "the most obvious and explicit and also, arguably, the clunkiest of his tributes to Lubitsch, partially inspired by Lubitsch's 1938 Bluebeard's Eighth Wife (which Wilder and [Charles] Brackett also helped to script, and which also starred Gary Cooper, again playing a womanizing American millionaire in France)". John Fawell wrote in 2008 that "Lubitsch was at his most imaginative when he lingered outside of doorways, particularly when something promiscuous was going on behind the door, a habit his pupil Billy Wilder picked up. In Wilder's most Lubitsch-like film, Love in the Afternoon, we know when Gary Cooper's rich playboy has bedded another conquest when we see the group of gypsy musicians (that travels with Cooper to aid in his wooing) tiptoe out of the hotel room, shoes in hand."

In an undated and unsigned review, TV Guide observes that the film has "the winsome charm of Hepburn, the elfin puckishness of Chevalier, a literate script by Wilder and Diamond, and an airy feeling that wafted the audience along," but felt it was let down by Gary Cooper, who "was pushing 56 at the time and looking too long in the tooth to be playing opposite the gamine Hepburn ... With little competition from the wooden Cooper, the picture is stolen by Chevalier's bravura turn".

Channel 4 stated: "the film as a whole is rather let down by the implausible chemistry that is meant to develop between Cooper and Hepburn."

In her film analysis, Marilyn Throne calls the script an exposure of the myth of "the girl-virgin as the seductress of the worldly and successful American male". Throne notes that the character of Ariane is surrounded by men—including her father—who all affirm and support the prerogative of men to philander and flirt, while women are expected to remain chaste. The sexual double standard is seen for what it is when Ariane's father confronts Flannagan, and both realize they were wrong. The detective-father who has made his wealth from investigating this playboy now realizes the playboy has seduced his own daughter, and the playboy who has mocked and eluded cuckolded husbands comes face to face with the father of the girl he seduced. Flannagan's decision at the end to scoop Ariane onto the moving train and later marry her puts an unrealistic romantic stamp on the story, given Flannagan's long history of philandering and Ariane's total inexperience with men and money. Throne concludes, "One rather wishes he'd adopted the girl instead of marrying her."

On the review aggregator website Rotten Tomatoes, 79% of 28 critics' reviews are positive. Metacritic, which uses a weighted average, assigned the film a score of 73 out of 100, based on 9 critics, indicating "generally favorable" reviews.

== Accolades ==
Screenwriters Wilder and Diamond won the award for "Best American Comedy" at the 1957 Writers Guild of America Awards.

Wilder was nominated for Outstanding Directing – Feature Film by the Directors Guild of America.

== See also ==
- List of American films of 1957
