= Samson (1915 film) =

1915 film by Edgar Lewis

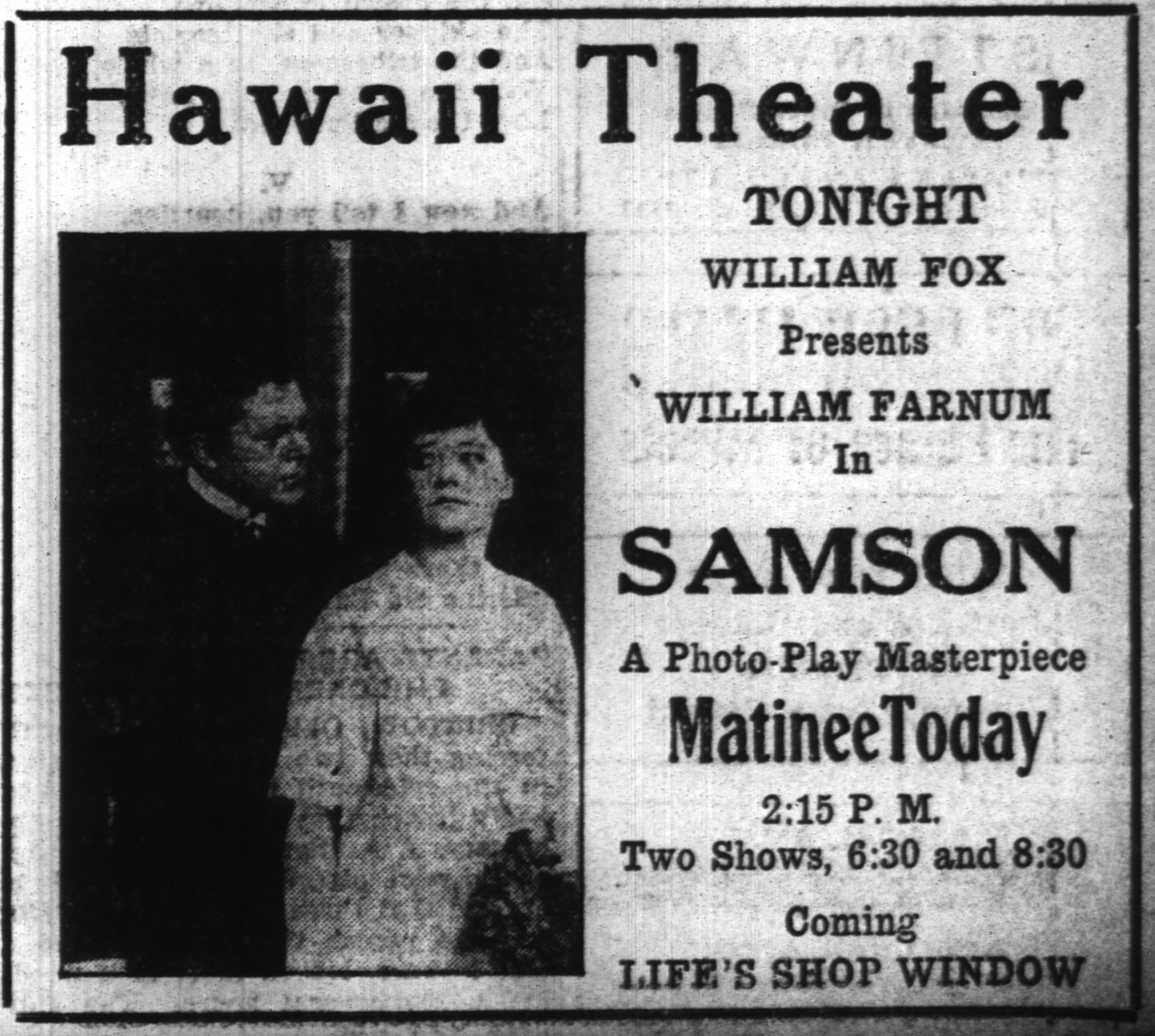
- Contemporary advertisement
- Directed by: Edgar Lewis
- Written by: Henri Bernstein (play); Paul Sloane
- Starring: William Farnum; Maude Gilbert; Edgar L. Davenport
- Production company: Box Office Attractions Company
- Distributed by: Box Office Attractions Company
- Release date: January 1915
- Running time: 50 minutes
- Country: United States
- Languages: Silent; English intertitles

Samson is a 1915 American silent drama film directed by Edgar Lewis and starring William Farnum, Maude Gilbert and Edgar L. Davenport. It is an adaptation of Henri Bernstein's play Samson. Farnum later appeared in a second adaptation Shackles of Gold, although the setting was switched from France to America. A print of Samson exists.

== Cast ==
- William Farnum as Maurice Brachard
- Maude Gilbert as Marie D'Andolin
- Edgar L. Davenport as Marquis D'Amdprom
- Agnes Everett as Marquise D'Andolin
- Harry Spingler as Max D'Andolin
- Charles Guthrie as Jerome Govaine
- Carey Lee as Elise Vernette
- George De Carlton as M. Deveraux
- Elmer Peterson as M. Fontenay
- Edward Kyle as Baron Hatzfeldt

== Bibliography ==
- Goble, Alan. The Complete Index to Literary Sources in Film. Walter de Gruyter, 1999.
