= Ariane, jeune fille russe (novel) =

1920 novel

Ariane, A Russian Girl
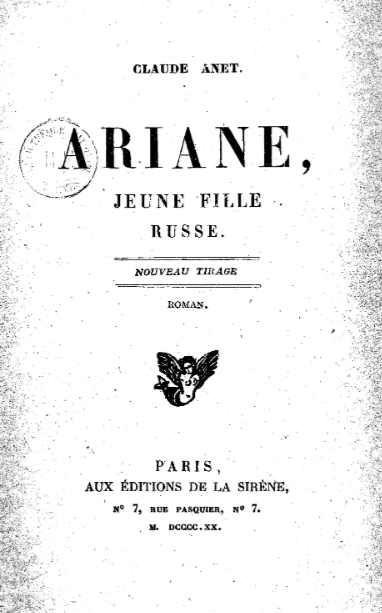
- Title page for Ariane, jeune fille russe (1920)
- Author: Jean Schopfer (as "Claude Anet")
- Original title: Ariane, jeune fille russe
- Translator: Guy Chapman (1927); Mitchell Abidor (2023)
- Language: French
- Publication date: 1920
- English publication date: 1927

Ariane, jeune fille russe (Ariane, A Russian Girl) is a 1920 novel by the French tennis player and writer Jean Schopfer, published under the pseudonym Claude Anet. It follows a young Russian woman who encounters a Don Juan and falls in love with him.

It was first translated into English in 1927 by Guy Chapman and published by Knopf. In 2023, New York Review Books published a new translation by Mitchell Abidor.

== Adaptations ==
The novel has been adapted into film several times. In 1931, the German film Ariane was made, with an English-language version called The Loves of Ariane, and a French-language version titled Ariane, jeune fille russe. All three were directed by Paul Czinner, and starred Elisabeth Bergner. In 1957, Billy Wilder adapted the novel for his American film Love in the Afternoon. In 1970, Muzaffer Arlsan adapted the novel for his Turkish film Arım Balım Peteğım. The same year, it was also the basis for a Lebanese-Egyptian film called The Great Love, starring Farid Al Attrash and Faten Hamama. In 2011, Prabhu Deva adapted the novel for his Tamil-language films as Engeyum Kaadhal.

== In popular culture ==
In Vladimir Nabokov's 1930 short novel, The Eye, two of the female characters are reading Ariane, jeune fille russe.
