= Henri Bernstein =

French playwright

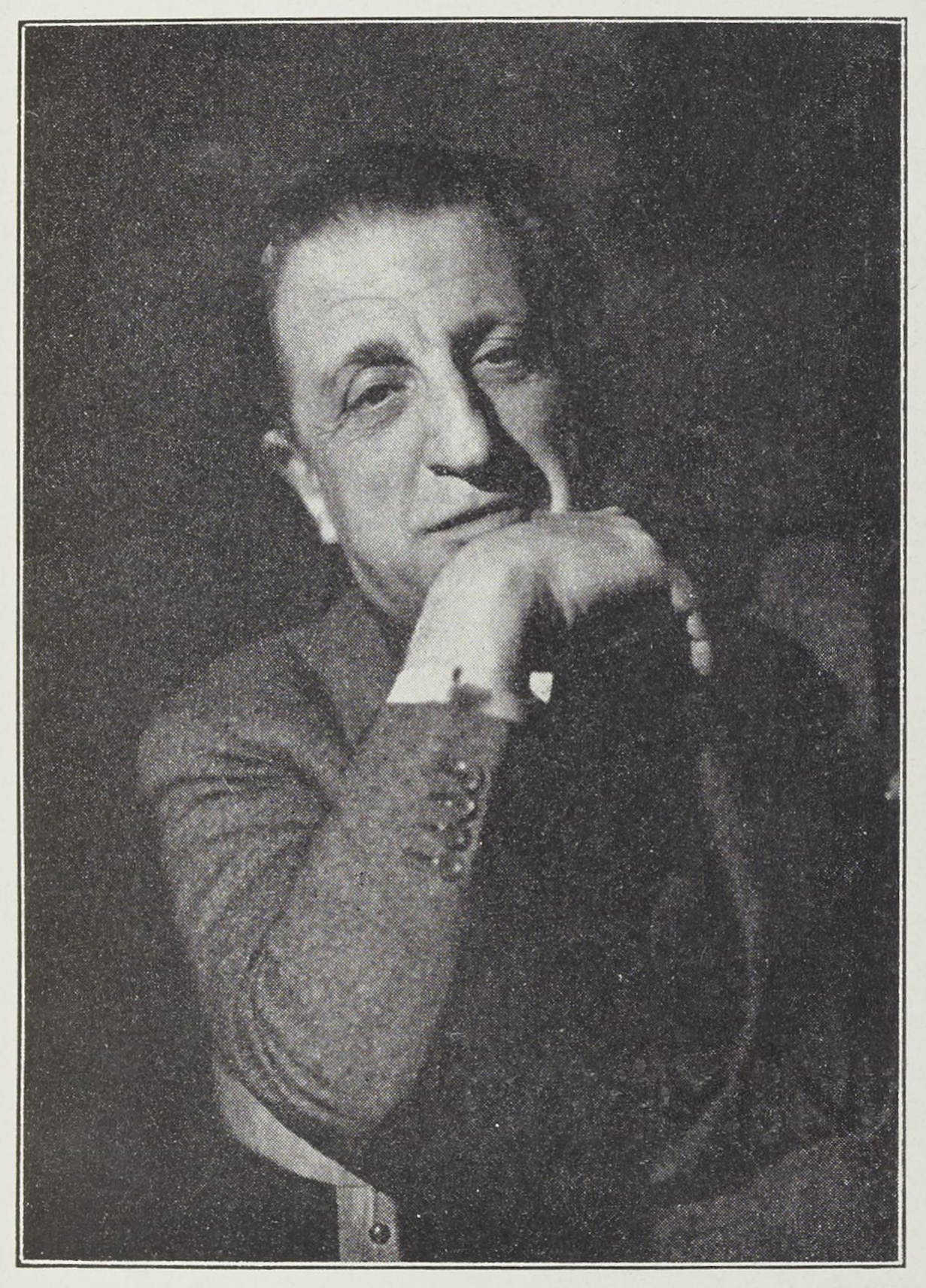
- Born: 20 June 1876; Paris, France
- Died: 27 November 1953 (aged 77); Paris, France
- Occupation: Playwright
- Spouse: Antoinette Martin (1891-1981)

Henri-Léon-Gustave-Charles Bernstein (20 June 1876 – 27 November 1953) was a French playwright associated with Boulevard theatre.

== Biography ==
Bernstein was born in Paris. His earliest plays, including La Rafale (1905), Le Voleur (1907), Samson (1908), Israël (1908), and Le Secret (1913), are written in a realistic style and powerfully depict harsh realities of modern life and society.

In late 1909, Bernstein was challenged to a duel by a critic named Chevassu in Paris. The duel originated from a letter Bernstein had sent to the French newspaper Comoedia. The letter responded "in violent terms" to a critical review of Bernstein's play La Griffe that published in another newspaper (Figaro) by Chevassu. After Bernstein refused to retract the letter, the duel was set to take place at the Parc des Princes. Both men agreed to draw pistols at 30 paces. Chevassu fired at Bernstein and missed, while one of Bernstein's seconds discharged the playwright's pistol. No one was injured in the duel. When asked why he didn't fire his own gun, Bernstein reportedly shrugged his shoulders and stated: "I forgot".

Bernstein was involved in another gun duel at the Parc des Princes in 1911, this time with journalist Gustave Tery. This duel was prompted by rioting at the presentation of Bernstein's play Après moi, and particularly by insults from a group of men towards Bernstein's honor. This duel also ended in no injuries, though one photographer covering the event was nearly hit by Bernstein's bullet.

The far-right royalist Camelots du Roi youth organization of the Action française organized an anti-Semitic riot against a production of one of his plays in 1911. During the Second World War, he fled to the United States and lived in New York City at the Waldorf Astoria. Jean-Pierre Aumont relates in his work Le Soleil et les Ombres (Robert Laffont, 1976) the luxury in which he lived, as well as his general lack of interest in the war.

He is buried in the Cimetière de Passy in Paris.

== Works ==
- Le Marché (The Market), 1900
- Le Détour, 1902
- Joujou, 1902
- Le Bercail, 1904
- La Rafale (Whirlwind), 1905
- La Griffe, La Renaissance, 1906 (known in English as The Claw or The Talon)
- Le Voleur (The Thief), 1906
- Samson, 1907
- Israël, 1908
- Après moi (After Me), 1911
- L'Assaut (The Assault), 1912
- Le Secret, 1913
- L'Élévation, 1917
- Judith, 1922
- La Galerie des glaces (The Hall of Mirrors), 1924
- Félix, 1926
- Mélo, 1929
- Le Bonheur (Happiness), 1933
- Le Cœur (The Heart), 1936
- Le Messager, 1937
- Elvire, 1939
- La Soif (The Thirst), 1949
- Victor, 1950
- Evangéline, 1952
- Espoir (Hope), 1955
- Le Venin (The Poison), 1927

== Filmography ==
- The Thief, directed by Edgar Lewis (Silent film, 1914, based on the play Le Voleur)
- Samson, directed by Edgar Lewis (Silent film, 1915, based on the play Samson)
- Sold, directed by Edwin S. Porter and Hugh Ford (Silent film, 1915, based on the play Le Secret)
- Le Bercail, directed by Marcel L'Herbier (Silent film, 1919, based on the play Le Bercail)
- Elevazione, directed by Telemaco Ruggeri (Silent film, 1920, based on the play L'Élévation)
- La Rafale, directed by Jacques de Baroncelli (Silent film, 1920, based on the play La Rafale)
- Shackles of Gold, directed by Herbert Brenon (Silent film, 1922, based on the play Samson)
- Samson, directed by Torello Rolli (Silent film, 1923, based on the play Samson)
- The Washington Masquerade, directed by Charles Brabin (English, 1932, based on the play La Griffe)
- Dreaming Lips, directed by Paul Czinner (German, 1932, based on the play Mélo)
  - ''Mélo, directed by Paul Czinner (French, 1932, based on the play Mélo)
- Le Voleur, directed by Maurice Tourneur (French, 1933, based on the play Le Voleur)
- Le Bonheur, directed by Marcel L'Herbier (French, 1934, based on the play Le Bonheur)
- Melodramma, directed by Robert Land and Giorgio Simonelli (Italian, 1934, based on the play Mélo)
- Samson, directed by Maurice Tourneur (French, 1936, based on the play Samson)
- L'Assaut, directed by Pierre-Jean Ducis (French, 1936, based on the play L'Assaut)
- Dreaming Lips, directed by Paul Czinner (English, 1937, based on the play Mélo)
- The Messenger, directed by Raymond Rouleau (French, 1937, based on the play Le Messager)
- Orage, directed by Marc Allégret (French, 1938, based on the play Le Venin)
- Victor, directed by Claude Heymann (French, 1951, based on the play Victor)
- Dreaming Lips, directed by Josef von Báky (German, 1953, based on the play Mélo)
- Delirio, directed by Giorgio Capitani and Pierre Billon (Italian, 1954, based on the play Le Venin)
- Mélo, directed by Alain Resnais (French, 1986, based on the play Mélo)
