= The Fiddler of Florence =

1926 film by Paul Czinner

- Directed by: Paul Czinner
- Written by: Paul Czinner; Carl Mayer
- Produced by: Erich Pommer
- Starring: Elisabeth Bergner; Conrad Veidt; Nora Gregor; Walter Rilla
- Cinematography: Otto Kanturek; Adolf Schlasy; Arpad Viragh
- Music by: Giuseppe Becce
- Production company: UFA
- Distributed by: Decla-Bioscop-Verleih
- Release date: 10 March 1926; (Gloria-Palast)
- Country: Germany
- Languages: Silent; German intertitles

The Fiddler of Florence (primarily known as The Violinist of Florence and Impetuous Youth) (German: Der Geiger von Florenz) is a 1926 German silent comedy film directed by Paul Czinner and starring Elisabeth Bergner, Conrad Veidt, and Nora Gregor.

The film was shot at the EFA Studios in Berlin and on location around Lake Lugano in Italy. It premiered at the Gloria-Palast in Berlin. It reunited Bergner and Veidt who had starred together in the successful Husbands or Lovers, also directed by Czinner. Despite the cross-dressing featured in the film, it played uncensored in Germany.

== Synopsis ==
Renée is jealous of her new stepmother, and when the situation at home becomes unbearable, her father sends her to a boarding school in Switzerland. Renée quickly becomes a problem student at the school.

So she is punished for her misbehavior, and forced to remain at the school during the holidays, while all of the other students go home. She makes a bold plan to run away and makes it to the Italian border. Since Renée has no passport to enter the country, she disguises herself as a shepherd boy to obtain entry.

Renée is now free in Italy, and remains in disguise as a boy, earning a meager living on the streets as a musician. One day a painter sees her while she is playing her violin. He is fascinated with her, and brings her to his home in Florence, where he lives with his sister. Renée reveals to the painter's sister that she is really a girl by placing the sister's hand on her breast, which results in the sister giving her a full kiss on the lips. Later, the brother is also seen kissing Renée who is still dressed as a boy.

In his studio in Florence, he paints a portrait of her, which becomes known as "The Violinist of Florence". The painter is unaware that she is starting to fall in love with him. As it turns out, the painting is a huge success and is heralded all throughout Europe, including Renée's hometown.

When her father learns of the news, he recognizes "The Violinist", and travels to Florence where he confronts the painter, insisting that his "comrade" be turned over to him. The painter says no, because he likes the boy. When the painter discovers that he has been duped, and his protégé is really a girl, he asks Renée's father for her hand in marriage.

After some tribulation, the father agrees, and the painter and Renée are married, and look forward to a happy future.

== Cast ==
- Elisabeth Bergner as Renée
- Conrad Veidt as Renée's father
- Nora Gregor as Renée's stepmother
- Walter Rilla as the painter
- Grete Mosheim as the painter's sister
- Ellen Plessow

== Background ==
The film was shot at the EFA Studios in Berlin and on location around Lake Lugano in Italy from August to November 1925. Conrad Veidt received word in the middle of August that his wife had given birth back in Germany, so he returned to Berlin to be with his wife and newborn daughter. After a short visit, Veidt returned to Florence to finish the picture.

The film was shown in Germany and Austria under the title Der Geiger von Florenz, and in England and the United States it was shown under the title Impetuous Youth.

== Analysis and reception ==
Renée (as a boy) posing for the artist

The finished painting as seen by Renée's father in newspaper

=== Analysis ===
German film theorist Siegfried Kracauer noted that "close-ups of Bergner depict her smallest movements and actions, as if to force them upon the viewer as symptoms of her feelings. This is a field day for psychoanalysts, made even more interesting by Bergner's boyishness. When she strolls along Italian streets in boys' clothes, she looks half boy, half girl. The androgynous character she embodies resonated in Germany, perhaps even more strongly due to the prevailing inner paralysis. Psychological frustration and sexual ambiguity reinforce each other."

Film historian Alexander Doty argues that heterocentric films like Impetuous Youth sometimes contain moments of queerness that operate in plain sight, passing as nonqueer within the main storyline. This is frequently achieved through popular culture tropes like cross-dressing, which both entertains and suggests homoerotic undertones. Impetuous Youth deliberately blurs the lines of attraction: is the painter actually seeing through Renée's cross-dressing, or is he really attracted to what he perceives as a male? In this context, the cross-dressing becomes a protective cover for queerness, and the observer who fails to notice the cross-dresser is subtly implicated in queer desire.

Psychoanalyst Hanns Sachs said a person he was analyzing had been "deeply and lastingly stirred by the film, The Fiddler of Florence, which, despite the acting and some interesting details, must certainly be ranked as Kitsch."

=== Reception ===
C. Hooper Trask wrote in Variety Magazine the film is an example of how impossible it is for the Germans to try to imitate an American program picture. This is just a silly lot of watery nonsense about a girl who runs away from home because she is jealous of her stepmother. In Germany, where they brew good beer, they do not also brew good lemonade. The film is really only worthy of notice because of Elisabeth Bergner. Here is a case of a great artiste who seems to be quite out of pace in the film.

German writer Franz Hessel said The Violinist of Florence is a blend of romantic and psychological motifs, with its strengths and weaknesses. It would likely be forgotten or mistaken for something else entirely were it not for one thing that made it unforgettable: the presence of Elisabeth Bergner. Oh, if only she could speak! Then everything would be alright. Whether she storms through the countryside as a false shepherd boy, whether she rests in gardens, raises her knees in dance steps with a violin at her chin, or lies rigidly thrown in her father's arms, it is not the cheerful or cute that provides her with the theme, not the charming trouser role that delights us; no, these cheeks, these fingers, these knees rejoice, suffer, love, and proclaim so much.

Film critic Mordaunt Hall commented that "in spite of its frailties this picture is rather interesting. Bergner handles the acting of the girl's role with sincerity, but, aside from the fact that she does not look in the least like a boy during those episodes wherein she is supposed to deceive the artist and others, she is not suited to part of Renee. Veidt is capital as the father, but unfortunately his role is not nearly as important as that of Bergner's. Others in the cast give competent performances."

== See also ==
- Cinema of Germany
- List of German films of 1919–1932
- List of LGBTQ-related films of the 1920s

== Bibliography ==
- Chapman, Frank, ed. (13 May 1927). "Sheperd's Bush Pavilion". Stage & Screen. Acton Gazette and Express. Vol. 59. London. p. 9.
- Allen, Jerry C. (1987). "Second Marriage and Birth of Daughter". Conrad Veidt: From Caligari to Casablanca. Foreword by Viola Veidt. Pacific Grove, CA: Boxwood Press. ISBN 0-940168-04-9.
- Battle, Pat Wilks (July–August 1993). "Conrad Veidt". Films in Review. 44 (7–8): 235. ISSN 0015-1688. "Der Geiger von Florenz (The Violinist Of Florence) aka Impetuous Youth"
- Hall, Mordaunt (13 June 1927). "The Screen: Impetuous Youth". The New York Times.
- Hessel, Franz (1929). "Die Bergner in Film". Film-Photos Wie Noch Nie (in German). Berlin: Kindt & Bucher Verlag. p. 27.
- Imperial Chemical Industries (August 1928). "Films Worth Seeing". I. C. I. Magazine. Vol. 2, no. 8. p. 238. One or more of the preceding sentences incorporates text from this source, which is in the public domain.
- Kreimeier, Klaus (1999). The Ufa Story: A History of Germany's Greatest Film Company, 1918–1945. Berkeley: University of California Press. ISBN 978-0-520-22069-0.
- Luft, Herbert G. (1968). "Carl Mayer, Screen Author". Cinema Journal. 8 (1): 29–38. doi:10.2307/1225225. ISSN 0009-7101.
- Sachs, Hanns (September 1932). "Kitsch". Close Up. Vol. 9, no. 3. p. 202.
- Soister, John T. (2002). Conrad Veidt on Screen: A Comprehensive Illustrated Filmography. Jefferson, North Carolina: McFarland & Company. ISBN 0-7864-1289-5.
- Steakley, James D. (1999). "Cinema and Censorship in the Weimar Republic: The Case of Anders als Die Andern". Film History. 11 (2): 202. ISSN 0892-2160.
- Trask, C. Hooper (14 April 1926). "Berlin Pictures: Der Geiger von Florenz". Variety Magazine. Vol. 82, no. 9. One or more of the preceding sentences incorporates text from this source, which is in the public domain.
- Völker, Klaus (1990). Elisabeth Bergner: Das Leben einer Schauspielerin [Elisabeth Bergner: The Life of an Actress] (in German). Berlin: Edition Hentrich. ISBN 3-926175-72-9.
- Wallach, Kerry (2017). "German-Jewish Passing in Comparative Contexts". In Canning, Kathleen (ed.). Passing Illusions: Jewish Visibility In Weimar Germany. Social History, Popular Culture, and Politics in Germany. Ann Arbor: University of Michigan Press. ISBN 978-0-472-07357-3.
