= Edward Bennett (director) =

British film and television director (born 1950)

- Born: 1950 (age 75–76); Cambridge, England
- Occupations: Film and television director
- Years active: 1978–present

Edward Bennett (born 1950) is a British film and television director. He was educated at Eton College. His most notable film is Ascendancy (1982), for which he won the Golden Bear at the 33rd Berlin International Film Festival. The following year he was a member of the jury at the 34th Berlin International Film Festival.

Bennett has also directed episodes of Bergerac, C.A.T.S. Eyes and Inspector Morse.
