= Doña Juana (film) =

1927 film

- Directed by: Paul Czinner
- Written by: Tirso de Molina (play); Béla Balázs; Paul Czinner
- Produced by: Paul Czinner; Elisabeth Bergner
- Starring: Elisabeth Bergner; Walter Rilla; Hertha von Walther; Elisabeth Neumann-Viertel
- Cinematography: Karl Freund; Robert Baberske; Adolf Schlasy
- Music by: Giuseppe Becce
- Production company: Elisabeth Bergner Films
- Distributed by: UFA
- Release date: 1927
- Country: Germany
- Languages: Silent; German intertitles

Doña Juana is a 1927 German silent comedy drama film directed by Paul Czinner and starring Elisabeth Bergner, Walter Rilla, and Hertha von Walther. It was based on a Spanish play by Tirso de Molina. The adaptation was done by Béla Balázs, who later tried to have his name removed from the credits because he disliked the finished version of the film. The film was shot on location around Seville and Granada in southern Spain.

== Plot ==
The story is based on a traditional seventeenth century play about a nobleman who educates his daughter to be raised as a boy, leading to a series of confusions in her romantic life.

== Cast ==
- Elisabeth Bergner as Doña Juana
- Walter Rilla as Don Ramon
- Hertha von Walther as Doña Ines
- Elisabeth Neumann-Viertel as Ines' Freundin Clara
- Fritz Greiner as Ramons Freund Osorio
- Hubert von Meyerinck as Dichter Don Alfonso
- Wolfgang von Schwind as Juanas Diener Francesco
- Max Schreck as Juanas Vater
- Lotte Stein as Juanas Erzieherin Duena
- Max Wogritsch as Don Felipe de Mendoza
- Rafael Calvo as Don Pedro de Padilla

== Bibliography ==
- Bock, Hans-Michael; Bergfelder, Tim, eds. (2009). The Concise Cinegraph: Encyclopaedia of German Cinema. New York: Berghahn Books. ISBN 978-1-57181-655-9.
- Congdon, Lee. Exile and Social Thought: Hungarian Intellectuals in Germany and Austria, 1919-1933. Princeton University Press, 2014.
- Kracauer, Siegfried. From Caligari to Hitler: A Psychological History of the German Film. Princeton University Press, 2019.
- Schmitt, Gavin. Karl Freund: The Life and Films. McFarland, 2022.
