= Samson (1936 film) =

1936 film directed by Maurice Tourneur

- Directed by: Maurice Tourneur
- Written by: Henri Bernstein (play); Léopold Marchand
- Starring: Harry Baur; Gaby Morlay; André Lefaur; Suzy Prim
- Cinematography: Victor Arménise; René Colas
- Edited by: René Le Hénaff
- Music by: Jacques Belasco
- Production company: Paris Film
- Distributed by: Paris Film
- Release date: 4 March 1936
- Running time: 90 minutes
- Country: France
- Language: French

Samson is 1936 French drama film directed by Maurice Tourneur and starring Harry Baur, Gaby Morlay and André Lefaur. It was based on the 1908 play of the same title by Henri Bernstein, which had previously been made into three silent films. The film was shot at the Joinville Studios in Paris, with sets designed by the art director Guy de Gastyne.

== Synopsis ==
An aristocratic woman is coerced by her impoverished family into marrying a wealthy business tycoon.

== Cast ==
- Harry Baur as Jacques Brachart
- Gaby Morlay as Anne-Marie d'Andeline
- André Lefaur as Le Marquis Honoré d'Andeline
- Gabrielle Dorziat as La Marquise d'Andeline
- André Luguet as Jérôme 'Jessie' Le Govain
- Suzy Prim as Grace Ritter
- Christian-Gérard as Max d'Andeline
- Maurice Bénard as Flash
- Laure Diana as Christiane Roy
- Léon Arvel as Grünbaum
- Simone Barillier
- Raymond Blot as Un invité chez Christiane
- Marie-Jacqueline Chantal as Lady Huxley
- Nane Chaubert
- Robert Clermont as Le maître d'hôtel
- Nicole de Rouves as Une invitée chez Christiane
- Ky Duyen as Le domestique de Le Govain
- Foun-Sen as Le vendeuse de charité
- Madeleine Geoffroy as Clotilde
- Anthony Gildès as Un invité chez Christiane
- Jean Joffre as Le directeur de la Voix Populaire
- Jeanne Juillia
- Jean Marconi as Un invité chez Christiane
- Charles Redgie as Stanley
- Fernande Saala
- Guy Sloux as Un invité chez Christiane

== Bibliography ==
- Goble, Alan. The Complete Index to Literary Sources in Film. Walter de Gruyter, 1999.
