= The Vulture (1982 film) =

- Directed by: Ferenc András
- Written by: Ferenc András; Miklós Munkácsi
- Starring: György Cserhalmi
- Cinematography: Elemér Ragályi
- Edited by: Mihály Morell
- Release date: 29 July 1982
- Running time: 115 minutes
- Country: Hungary
- Language: Hungarian

The Vulture (original Hungarian title Dögkeselyű) is a 1982 Hungarian crime film directed by Ferenc András. It was entered into the 33rd Berlin International Film Festival.

== Plot ==
Taxi driver József Simon is robbed by two elderly lady passengers. In vain does the divorced, debt-ridden man turn to the police, they don't believe him. He starts doing his own investigation to find the thieves. Since he has lost faith in justice being served legally, he sets off on a one-man revenge campaign.

== Soundtrack ==
The theme song of The Vulture was composed by György Kovács. Its melody is very similar to that of Airport by The Motors, although whether this is coincidental is not known.

== Cast ==
- György Cserhalmi as József Simon
- Hédi Temessy as Mrs. Halmos, née Mária Roska
- Zita Perczel as Mrs. Szántó, née Erzsébet Roska, Mária's sister
- Maria Gladkowska as Cecília, Mária's daughter
- Mari Kiss as Cecília (voice)
- Ferenc Bács as Előd Kowarski gangster boos
- Péter Blaskó as Lt. Siska
- Marianna Moór as Mrs. Kowarski
- Vera Pap as Kati
- László Szabó as Capt. Kovács
- Dorottya Udvaros as Ági the prostitute
- Frigyes Hollósi as colleague of Lt. Siska
- János Katona as Det. Gyetvai
- Tibor Kristóf as colleague of Lt. Siska
- Dénes Ujlaky as garagemaster
