= Strange Friends =

1982 film

- Directed by: Xu Lei
- Written by: Xu Lei; Li Baoyuan; Xu Tianxia
- Starring: Li Ling
- Cinematography: Huang Xinyi
- Release date: 1982
- Running time: 80 minutes
- Country: China
- Language: Mandarin

Strange Friends (Chinese: 陌生的朋友; pinyin: Mò shēng de péng yǒu) is a 1982 Chinese film directed by Xu Lei. It was entered into the 33rd Berlin International Film Festival, where it won an Honourable Mention.

== Cast ==
- Li Ling
- Wang Yunxia
- Zhang Chao
- Zhan Jingbo
