= Samson (1923 film) =

1923 film

- Directed by: Torello Rolli
- Written by: Henri Bernstein (play)
- Starring: Angelo Ferrari; Elena Sangro
- Cinematography: Guido Di Segni
- Production company: Caesar Film
- Distributed by: UCI
- Release date: 5 May 1923
- Country: Italy
- Languages: Silent; Italian intertitles

Samson (Italian: Sansone) is a 1923 Italian silent drama film directed by Torello Rolli and starring Angelo Ferrari and Elena Sangro. It is an adaptation of the 1908 play of the same title by Henri Bernstein. A woman from a poor aristocratic family is pressured by her relatives to marry a wealthy businessman, although she doesn't love him.

== Cast ==
- Gemma De Ferrari
- Angelo Ferrari as Jack Brachart
- Franco Gennaro as Andeline
- Giuseppe Pierozzi
- Elena Sangro as Anne-Marie d'Andeline
- Enrico Scatizzi as La Govain

== Bibliography ==
- Goble, Alan. The Complete Index to Literary Sources in Film. Walter de Gruyter, 1999.
