= Paris Calling =

1941 film by Edwin L. Marin

- Theatrical release poster
- Directed by: Edwin L. Marin
- Screenplay by: Benjamin Glazer; Charles Kaufman
- Story by: Hans Székely
- Produced by: Benjamin Glazer
- Starring: Elisabeth Bergner; Randolph Scott; Basil Rathbone
- Cinematography: Milton Krasner
- Edited by: Edward Curtiss
- Music by: Richard Hageman
- Production company: Charles K. Feldman Productions
- Distributed by: Universal Pictures
- Release date: December 4, 1941
- Running time: 95 minutes
- Country: United States
- Language: English

Paris Calling is a 1941 American war film noir directed by Edwin L. Marin and starring Randolph Scott, Elisabeth Bergner and Basil Rathbone. It was produced by Universal Pictures before America's entry into World War II and released just after the attack on Pearl Harbor.

== Plot ==
Marianne is a wealthy young French woman in Paris. Andre Benoit, a government official and her fiancé, visits Marianne at her house party and discreetly tells her that she must flee Paris tonight, as the French government is moving out of Paris in advance of the German occupation.

Marianne and her mother are fleeing the city, along with thousands of others, when the Germans begin to bomb them. In the process, Marianne’s mother dies of shock. Marianne insists on taking the car and bringing her mother home to Paris, regardless of the Nazis.

One of the German soldiers encounters a crisis of conscience over killing children and innocents and jumps out of his plane, landing safely with his parachute. The Allied soldiers mistake him for one of their own and pick him up, but after they take off, realize he is German. He begins whispering the Lord’s Prayer. Back at their current station, the two soldiers begin interrogating him, and they drink various forms of liquor together in an attempt to make him talk. After they have all fallen asleep, the German takes one of their guns and escapes. The Allied soldiers wake to find that everyone else left, and the Nazis are now occupying the building in which they were staying. They are stranded.

Meanwhile, Marianne arrives back at her home to find that it is an improvised meeting spot for the neighborhood resistance. She joins immediately and takes a position playing piano in a bar; however, the piano music is really a clever way to send messages, specifically the low B-flat note, which translates Morse code over short wave.

The Allied soldiers hitch a ride on a Nazi truck carrying hay, which is dumped on top of their planes to conceal them from aerial surveillance. From above, the entire airfield just looks like stacks of hay. When planes fly over, the soldiers set fire to the hay stacks with lighters to get their attention. One of the soldiers is shot and killed while escaping, but the other evades capture by throwing his helmet into the river as a distraction.

Back at the bar, German soldiers investigate the signals coming from the location but are unable to determine how they are being sent. The Allied soldier enters the bar at the same time, raising suspicion from the lead officer, but strict instructions are given not to arrest anyone at the time. The bar is instead kept under observation. The Allied man tells Marianne that he is a flyer left behind and she gives him the key to her room, but the bar owner suspects him to be a German agent. He instructs her to give the man food, drink, and even accept romantic advances if necessary to keep away suspicion that they are on to him. She enters the room to find him sleeping in her bed, and after he falls asleep again, discovers a wound on his leg, further convincing her that he is telling the truth.

In the morning, the bar owners are ordered by the resistance to turn the soldier in to the Nazis, just in case he is a Nazi spy testing if they are willing to hide Allies. Marianne brings him breakfast and is convinced he is not a Nazi, and hides him from the bar owner. He is found and he and Marianne are brought by the resistance leader to a resistance meeting place to be tested. While waiting, they witness a man be led away to be killed for losing his nerve during a Nazi raid.

It is revealed to Marianne that Andre, her fiancé, is on the payroll of the Nazis and has been for some time. To prove her loyalty, she is tasked to go back to Andre and gain information from him. On a monitored phone call, she finds out that Andre wants her to return to Paris.

She and Andre reunite where he is staying and dine together. They are visited by a Nazi officer who swaps important meeting minutes for harmless papers, leaving the papers in a briefcase that will stick anyone who tries to open it with a needle. Andre and Marianne enjoy some time together before going to bed. Marianne tries to open the briefcase but is caught by Andre, who sees the blood on her hand and grows suspicious. He forces her to tell him that she is a spy, and defends his betrayal of France by claiming that the French government was weak and outdated.

Andre declares that he loves Marianne but will destroy her if necessary, demanding that she reveal the identities of the ones who sent her. She allows him to embrace her as she reaches for his gun and shoots him. The manservant, really a resistance member, helps her escape with important papers she took from inside Andre’s robe. She pretends Andre is still alive, ‘speaking’ to him just before exiting to avoid suspicion. She goes to the headquarters to turn in the papers, but no one answers the door, so she heads to the bar at which she had worked.

The Allied soldier is apprehended with his fake passport by the Germans. While in custody, he overhears the news that Andre has been found dead and Marianne escaped. The officer guarding him happens to be the German flyer they accidentally picked up days ago, and the soldier asks the Nazi to repay the favor.

Wearing the Nazi’s uniform, the Allied soldier returns to the bar and finds Marianne and the owner commiserating; they have deemed the situation hopeless, as they have no way to transmit the message they have due to Nazi suspicion. With the soldier dressed as a Nazi, Marianne begins transmitting their message, and the Germans are alerted that the bar is sending the message once again. Nazis begin to search the bar, and one questions Marianne about Andre Benoit, whom they know to be dead. Once she finishes playing, he leads her away for a drink.

The Nazis accuse Marianne of conspiracy and murder, locate the transmission line, and put the entire bar under arrest while the Allied soldier sets a car on fire to alert a plane. At the last moment, Allied soldiers burst in and arrest all the Nazi officers, rescuing Marianne and everyone else. She and the soldier are taken to England to work with the resistance commander-in-chief.

== Cast ==
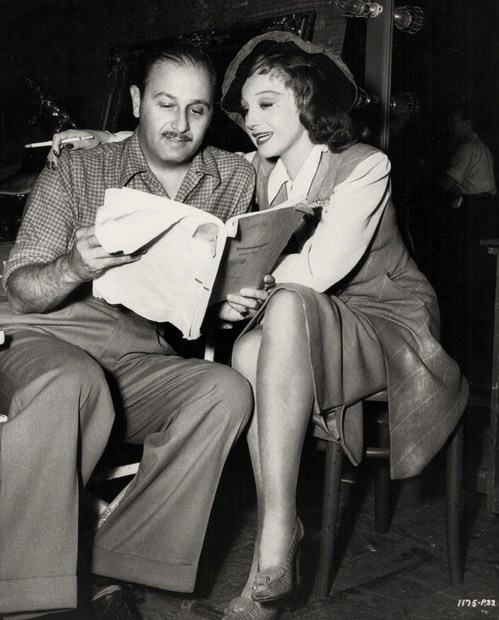
Director Edwin L. Marin and star Elisabeth Bergner on the film set.

- Elisabeth Bergner as Marianne Jannetier
- Randolph Scott as Lt. Nicholas 'Nick' Jordan
- Basil Rathbone as Andre Benoit
- Gale Sondergaard as Colette
- Lee J. Cobb as Captain Schwabe
- Charles Arnt as Lt. Lantz
- Edward Ciannelli as Mouche
- Elisabeth Risdon as Madame Jannetier
- Georges Renavent as Butler
- William Edmunds as Prof. Marceau
- J. Pat O'Malley as Sgt. Bruce McAvoy
- George Metaxa as Waiter
- Paul Leyssac as Chief of underground
- Gene Garrick as Wolfgang Schmitt
- Paul Bryar as Paul
- Otto Reichow as Gruber
- Adolph Milar as Gestapo agent
- Marion Murray as Charie
- Grace Lenard as Marie
- Yvette Bentley as Simone
- Marcia Ralston as Renne

== Production notes ==
- Production dates: July 22 to Mid-September 1941
- This was the first film made in America by noted European stage and screen actress Elisabeth Bergner, whose name is spelled "Elizabeth" in the onscreen credits.

== Bibliography ==
- Dick, Bernard F. The Star-Spangled Screen: The American World War II Film. University Press of Kentucky, 2015.
