= Ariane, jeune fille russe (film) =

1931 film

- Directed by: Paul Czinner
- Written by: Claude Anet (novel); Paul Czinner
- Starring: Gaby Morlay; Rachel Devirys; Maria Fromet
- Cinematography: Jules Kruger; René Ribault
- Music by: Richard Strauss
- Release date: 26 February 1932 (Paris)
- Running time: 85 minutes
- Countries: France; Germany
- Language: French

Ariane, jeune fille russe is a 1931 French-German drama film directed by Paul Czinner and starring Gaby Morlay, Rachel Devirys and Maria Fromet. It was a French-language version of the film Ariane. It was adapted from the 1920 novel Ariane, jeune fille russe by Claude Anet.

== Premise ==
Ariane, a Russian student in Paris, decides to seduce a man who is in his forties.

== Cast ==
- Gaby Morlay as Ariane
- Rachel Devirys as Aunt Warwara
- Maria Fromet as Olga
- Victor Francen as Constantin
- Jean Dax as Professor
- Durthal as Doctor Kundert
