= Samson (play) =

1908 play by the French writer Henri Bernstein

Samson is a 1908 play by the French writer Henri Bernstein. It is a melodrama in which a poor man rises to become a wealthy tycoon. He marries a daughter of an aristocratic family whose impoverished relatives pressure her to wed him. The marriage proves a disaster for the protagonist, as his power is destroyed. The plot and title are a reference to the story of Samson and Delilah.

== Adaptations ==
The play was adapted into four film versions:

- Samson, a 1915 American silent
- Shackles of Gold, a 1922 American silent
- Samson, a 1923 Italian silent
- Samson, a 1936 French film

== Bibliography ==
- Goble, Alan. The Complete Index to Literary Sources in Film. Walter de Gruyter, 1999.
