= Ferenc András =

Hungarian film director (1942–2024)

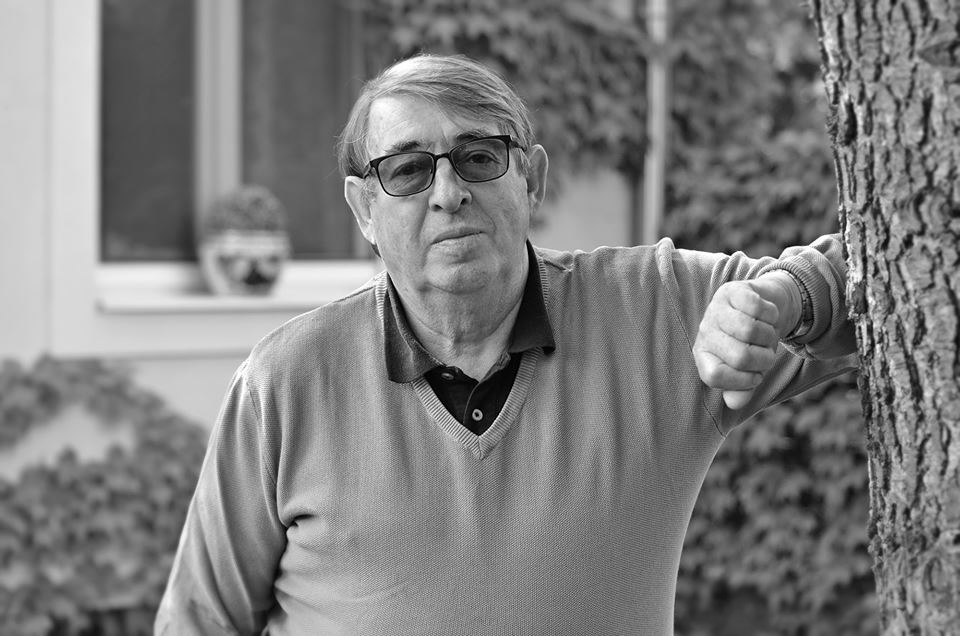
- Born: 24 November 1942; Budapest, Hungary
- Died: 25 April 2024 (aged 81); Budapest, Hungary
- Occupations: Film director, screenwriter
- Years active: 1970–2024

Ferenc András (24 November 1942 – 25 April 2024) was a Hungarian film director and screenwriter. He directed more than 20 films from 1970. His 1982 film Dögkeselyű was entered into the 33rd Berlin International Film Festival. András died in Budapest on 25 April 2024, at the age of 81.

== Selected filmography ==
- Dögkeselyű (1982)
