= Elisabeth Neumann-Viertel =

Austrian actress

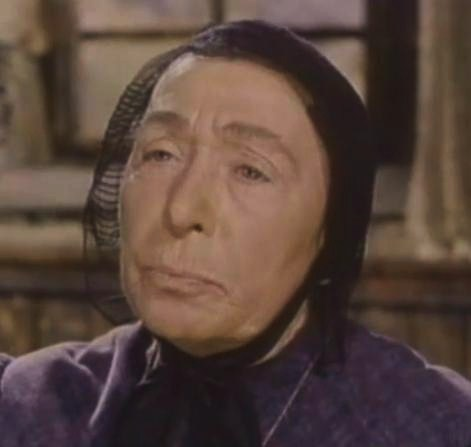
- Elisabeth Neumann-Viertel in Heidi (1968)
- Born: Elisabeth Neumann; 5 April 1900; Vienna, Austria-Hungary
- Died: 24 December 1994 (aged 94); Vienna, Austria
- Occupation: Actress
- Years active: 1921–1988
- Spouse: Berthold Viertel (m. 1949; died 1953)

Elisabeth Neumann-Viertel (5 April 1900 – 24 December 1994) was an Austrian actress who started her career in Germany during the 1920s. Under the Nazi regime she emigrated to the United States, where she appeared on the Broadway and in a few Hollywood movies. She later returned to Germany, where she worked with numerous successful theatres of Berlin, among them Fritz Kortner's Berliner Bühnen. Neumann-Viertel was also a notable character actress in films and television, although she seldom played a leading role there. She retired in the late 1980s after nearly 70 years of acting. Elisabeth Neumann-Viertel was the third wife of film director Berthold Viertel.

== Partial filmography ==
- Sister Veronika (1927)
- The Merry Vineyard (1927) - Frl. Stenz
- Doña Juana (1927) - Ines' Freundin Clara
- M (1931) - (uncredited)
- The Murderer Dimitri Karamazov (1931) - Fenja
- Donogoo Tonka (1936) - Auswandererfrau
- Boccaccio (1936) - Junge Frau aus Ferrara
- Lucky Kids (1936)
- Ave Maria (1936) - Konzertbesucherin
- The Strange Death of Adolf Hitler (1943) - Mizzi
- The House on 92nd Street (1945) - Freda Kassel (uncredited)
- The Eternal Waltz (1954) - Mutter Strauß
- Beichtgeheimnis (1956) - Frau Blendinger
- The Secret Ways (1961) - Olga Kovac
- The Wonderful World of the Brothers Grimm (1962) - Flower Vendor (uncredited)
- Freud: The Secret Passion (1962) - Frau Bernays, Martha's Mother (uncredited)
- Kurzer Prozess (1967)
- Heidi (1968, TV Movie) - Grandmother
- Cabaret (1972) - Fraulein Schneider
- The Odessa File (1974) - Frau Wenzer
- Kara Ben Nemsi Effendi (1975, TV Series) - Einödbäuerin
- Derrick (1978, TV Series) - Frau Ellweg
- The Fifth Musketeer (1979) - Oberin im Kloster
- The American Success Company (1980)
- Peppermint Peace (1983) - Grandmother
- Happy Weekend (1983)
- The Little Drummer Girl (1984) - Mrs. Minkel
- Why Is There Salt in the Sea? (1988, TV Movie) - Uschi's Grandmother (final film role)
