= Ascendancy (film) =

- Theatrical poster
- Directed by: Edward Bennett
- Written by: Edward Bennett; Nigel Gearing
- Produced by: Penny Clark
- Starring: Julie Covington; Ian Charleson
- Cinematography: Clive Tickner
- Edited by: Charles Rees; George Akers
- Music by: Ronnie Leahy
- Distributed by: Production company: British Film Institute
- Release date: 28 April 1983 (UK)
- Running time: 92 minutes
- Country: United Kingdom
- Language: English
- Budget: £250,000 or £183,000

Ascendancy is a 1983 British drama film directed by Edward Bennett and starring Julie Covington and Ian Charleson. It tells the story of a woman who is a member of the British landowning 'Ascendancy' in Ireland during World War I. Gradually, she learns about the Irish independence movement, and becomes involved with it.

== Cast ==
- Julie Covington as Connie Wintour
- Ian Charleson as Lt. Ryder
- John Phillips as Wintour
- Susan Engel as Nurse
- Philip Locke as Dr Strickland
- Kieran Montague as Dr Kelson
- Rynagh O'Grady as Rose
- Philomena McDonagh as Mary
- Michael McKnight as Vesey
- Jeremy Sinden as Darcy
- Shay Gorman as Keir

== Awards ==
The film was entered into the 33rd Berlin International Film Festival where it won the Golden Bear.
