= Dreaming Lips (1953 film) =

1953 film

- German: Der träumende Mund
- Directed by: Josef von Báky
- Written by: Paul Czinner; Carl Mayer; Johanna Sibelius
- Based on: Mélo by Henri Bernstein
- Produced by: Dietrich von Theobald; Josef von Báky
- Starring: Maria Schell; O. W. Fischer; Philip Dorn; Marga Maasberg
- Cinematography: Konstantin Irmen-Tschet
- Edited by: Alice Ludwig
- Music by: Alois Melichar
- Production company: Fama-Film
- Distributed by: Europa Film
- Release date: 29 January 1953 (Germany)
- Running time: 91 minutes
- Country: West Germany
- Language: German

Dreaming Lips (German: Der träumende Mund) is a 1953 German drama film directed by Josef von Báky and starring Maria Schell, O. W. Fischer and Philip Dorn. It was shot at the Wandsbek Studios and on location around Hamburg. The film's sets were designed by the art directors Emil Hasler and Peter Röhrig. It is a remake of the 1932 film Dreaming Lips by Paul Czinner. Czinner had also remade the film in Britain in 1937.

== Cast ==
- Maria Schell as Elisabeth
- O. W. Fischer as Peter
- Philip Dorn as Michael
- Marga Maasberg as Marie
- Eva Portmann as Christine
- Günther Jerschke as Sekretär
- Erwin Linder as Arzt
