= Fräulein Else (1929 film) =

1929 film by Paul Czinner

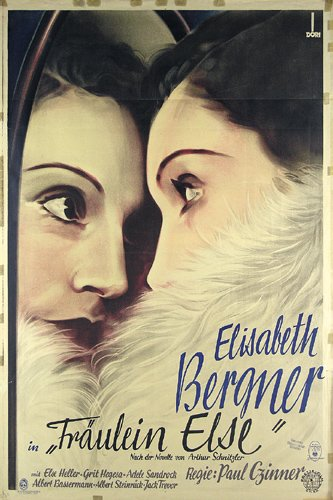
- Directed by: Paul Czinner
- Written by: Arthur Schnitzler (novella); Paul Czinner; Carl Mayer
- Produced by: Erich Frisch; Artur Kiekebusch-Brenken
- Starring: Elisabeth Bergner; Albert Bassermann; Albert Steinrück; Adele Sandrock
- Cinematography: Karl Freund
- Production company: Elisabeth Bergner Films
- Distributed by: Bavaria Film
- Release date: 8 March 1929
- Running time: 90 minutes
- Country: Germany
- Languages: Silent; German intertitles

Fräulein Else (English: Miss Else) is a 1929 German silent drama film directed by Paul Czinner and starring Elisabeth Bergner, Albert Bassermann and Albert Steinrück. It was based on the 1924 novella of the same name by Arthur Schnitzler. Bergner had previously played her role on stage to great acclaim. However, it was felt that the film was hindered by being silent given the strength of the story's dialogue.

== Partial cast ==
- Elisabeth Bergner as Else Thalhof
- Albert Bassermann as Dr. Alfred Thalhof
- Albert Steinrück as Von Dorsday
- Adele Sandrock as Tante Emma
- Else Heller as Dr. Thalhofs Frau
- Jack Trevor as Paul, Tante Emma's Sohn
- Grit Hegesa as Cissy Mohr
- Irmgard Bern
- Antonie Jaeckel
- Gertrude De Lalsky
- Paul Morgan
- Jaro Fürth
- Carl Goetz
- Alexander Murski
- Ellen Plessow
- Toni Tetzlaff

== Bibliography ==
- Lorenz, Dagmar C. G. A Companion to the Works of Arthur Schnitzler. Camden House, 2003.
- Prawer, S.S. Between Two Worlds: The Jewish Presence in German and Austrian Film, 1910-1933. Berghahn Books, 2005.
