= Ariane (film) =

1931 film

- Directed by: Paul Czinner
- Written by: Paul Czinner; Carl Mayer
- Based on: Ariane by Claude Anet
- Produced by: Seymour Nebenzahl; Ernst Wolff
- Starring: Elisabeth Bergner; Rudolf Forster; Annemarie Steinsieck
- Cinematography: Adolf Schlasy
- Edited by: Herbert Selpin
- Music by: André Roubaud
- Production company: Nero Film
- Distributed by: Vereinigte Star-Film
- Release date: 20 February 1931
- Running time: 85 minutes
- Country: Germany
- Language: German

Ariane is a 1931 German drama film directed by Paul Czinner and starring Elisabeth Bergner, Rudolf Forster and Annemarie Steinsieck. It is an adaptation of the 1920 French novel Ariane, jeune fille russe by Claude Anet. Two alternative language versions The Loves of Ariane and Ariane, jeune fille russe were made at the same time. The film was the inspiration of the 1957 Billy Wilder film Love in the Afternoon. Wilder remembered the film as "touching and funny". It was shot at the Staaken Studios in Berlin. The film's sets were designed by the art directors Erich Zander and Karl Weber. Location shooting took place in Paris.

== Plot ==
Exiled Russian student Ariane Kusnetzowa has graduated from high school in Zurich. She decides to travel to Berlin to study. During a visit to the opera, she meets well-mannered and much older Konstantin Michael, a charming, if somewhat reserved, gentleman and bon vivant. He starts wooing her, and the young and initially shy girl tries to impress him by pretending to be a seasoned adventuress who already has some experience with men.

Konstantin makes his point of view clear to Ariane from the start. "I won't be staying here long. One day I will leave on a journey and never return. But I would like to spend this short time with you, Ariane Kuznetzowa.” Ariane gets involved in this game in the hope of one day binding this enigmatic man, who has a strong charisma, to her forever. She doesn't want to admit the love she feels for him (yet). After a holiday together in Italy, the day of departure comes. This ends in nothing more than an adventure for Konstantin, and he abandons Ariane without batting an eyelid. A world collapses for the girl. Although deeply hurt, she doesn't show it and acts completely cool when she says goodbye.

Back in Berlin, Ariane considers how she can take revenge on Konstantin for this humiliation. The opportunity arises when he comes to Berlin again and arranges to meet Ariane. When she comes face to face with him, she can't help but confess her love to him in a heated argument. Gradually Konstantin begins to understand. Ariane has decided to end the chapter of Constantine for good. They say goodbye at the train station. When the train starts to move, Ariane follows along for a while, then the man makes his decision. At the moment when her strength is about to dwindle, Konstantin Michael lifts the girl onto the train which carries them into a shared future.

== Cast ==
- Elisabeth Bergner as Ariane Kusnetzowa
- Rudolf Forster as Konstantin Michael
- Annemarie Steinsieck as Tante Warwara
- Hertha Guthmar as Olga
- Theodor Loos as Doctor Hans Adameit
- Nikolas Wassiljeff as Student
- Alfred Gerasch as Doctor

== Bibliography ==
- Phillips, Gene D. (2010). Some Like It Wilder: The Life and Controversial Films of Billy Wilder. Lexington: University Press of Kentucky. ISBN 978-0-8131-7367-2.
