= Paul Leyssac =

Danish writer and actor (1881–1946)

- Born: Paul Andri Jurgensen Leyssac; 21 June 1881; Copenhagen, Denmark
- Died: 20 August 1946 (aged 65); Copenhagen, Denmark
- Occupations: Actor, writer
- Years active: 1937–43 (film)

Paul Andri Jurgensen Leyssac (21 June 1881 – 20 August 1946) was a Danish writer, and stage and film actor. He played Abraham Lincoln in the 1937 British film Victoria the Great. He also was a translator of the works of Hans Christian Andersen.

Leyssac acted with the Civic Repertory theatrical group headed by Eva Le Gallienne. His career on Broadway began with George Washington (1920) and ended with The Tempest (1945).

== Selected filmography ==
- Victoria the Great (1937)
- Head Over Heels (1937)
- Arise, My Love (1940)
- Paris Calling (1941)
- Assignment in Brittany (1943)

== Bibliography ==
- Mark S. Reinhart. Abraham Lincoln on Screen: Fictional and Documentary Portrayals on Film and Television. McFarland, 2009.
