= Stolen Life (1939 film) =

- French release poster
- Directed by: Paul Czinner
- Written by: George Barraud; Margaret Kennedy
- Based on: Uloupeny zivot 1935 novel by Karel J. Benes
- Produced by: Paul Czinner; Anthony Havelock-Allan
- Starring: Michael Redgrave; Elisabeth Bergner; Wilfrid Lawson
- Cinematography: Philip Tannura
- Edited by: Frederick Wilson
- Music by: William Walton
- Production company: Orion Productions
- Distributed by: Paramount British Pictures
- Release date: 18 January 1939
- Running time: 90 minutes
- Country: United Kingdom
- Language: English

Stolen Life is a 1939 British drama film directed by Paul Czinner and starring Michael Redgrave, Elisabeth Bergner and Wilfrid Lawson. It was written by George Barraud and Margaret Kennedy adapted from the 1935 novel Uloupeny zivot by Karel J. Benes. The film was remade in 1946 as A Stolen Life.

== Synopsis ==
After meeting and apparently falling in love with Martina, a young woman he meets in Switzerland, mountaineer Alan MacKenzie instead marries her more forceful twin sister Sylvina. Later, while he is away leading an expedition to conquer a previously unclimbable mountain in Tibet, the two sisters holiday in Brittany. After Sylvina is drowned in a sailing accident, Martina is mistaken for her after being rescued from the water clutching her sister's wedding ring. Deciding to impersonate her dead sister, she finds that Sylvina had been carrying on an affair with another man and planned to divorce Alan. After Alan arrives in Athens with his team, having successfully climbed the mountain, the couple embrace after he discovers her true identity.

== Cast ==
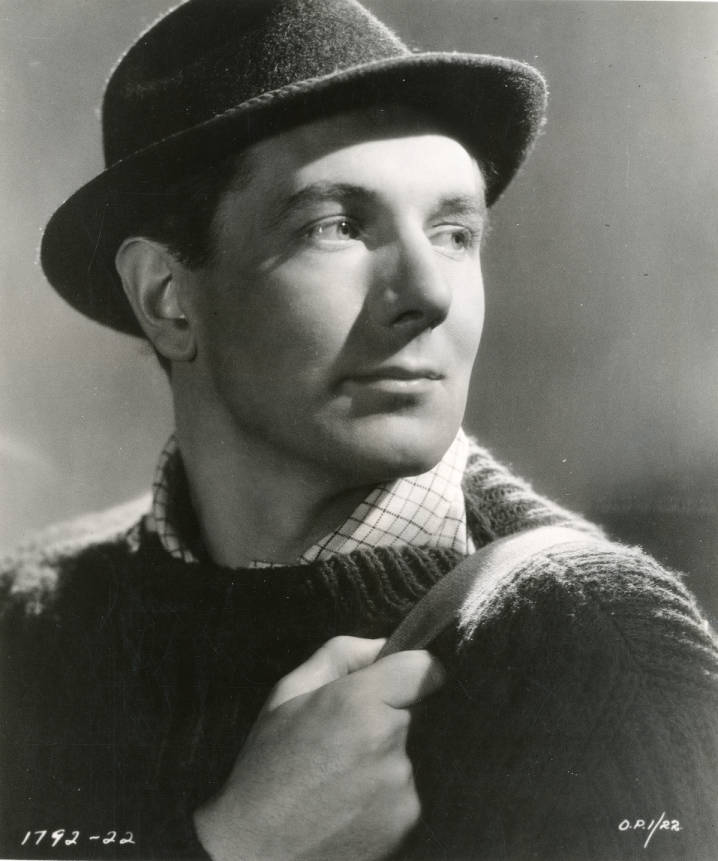
Michael Redgrave

- Elisabeth Bergner as Sylvina Lawrence / Martina Lawrence
- Michael Redgrave as Alan MacKenzie
- Wilfrid Lawson as Thomas E. Lawrence
- Mabel Terry-Lewis as Aunt Helen
- Richard Ainley as Morgan
- Kenneth Milne-Buckley as Garrett
- Daniel Mendaille as Old Pauliac
- Pierre Juvenet as doctor
- Stella Arbenina as nurse
- Kaye Seeley as Maturin
- Ernest Ferny as Superintendent Demangeon
- Cot D'Ordan as. clerk
- Dorice Fordred as Eileen, Sylvina's maid
- Annie Esmond as cook
- Clement McCallin as Karal Anderson
- Oliver Johnston as Professor Bardesley
- Roy Russell as British Minister
- Homer Regus as Mayor

== Production ==
The film was made at Pinewood Studios with location filming in Cornwall, the South of France and the Dolomites in Italy. The film score was composed by William Walton. The film's sets were by the art director John Bryan, and costumes were designed by Joe Strassner.

== Releases ==
The film was re-released in 1942. It premiered in France in 1946 and in 1951 in West Germany. Czinner and Bergner had been forced to leave Germany following the Nazi takeover in 1933 and their films were banned there.

== Reception ==
The Monthly Film Bulletin wrote: "This artificial and commonplace theme is made real and almost convincing by skilled and imaginative direction, and brilliant acting. The working out of the story is ingenious and dramatically effective. Elisabeth Bergner gives a faultless performance in the double identity role. She depicts with unerring touch and certainty the differing characteristics of the two sisters. Michael Redgrave is almost equally good in a less exacting part. Thanks to them and to the director both sentiment and emotion are kept within bounds."

Kine Weekly wrote: "Romantic melodrama, telling of a great impersonation, a living lie in the interests of love. Direction and staging are artistic, but intelligent treatment does not entirely conceal the fictional weakness of the basic theme. Feminine appeal, however, remains, and so does the pull of Elisabeth Bergner. The last two factors strongly indicate box-office success in other than industrial halls. ... The fundamental faults of the play are the extravagance of its narrative and its insistence upon the very best manners in every circumstance. It is too precise and proper to storm the emotions."

Variety wrote: "Several things in this picture stand out for, and against its success. So much pains were taken to inject 'class' that the film is apt to pass over the heads of most film patrons. On the other hand, its appeal fo an intellectual public is partially nullified by the lack of originality and the chain of coincidences which makes one become skeptical. ... Miss Bergner enacts with subtle differentiation the roles of the sisters. Her splendid support is heade by Michael Redgrave. Direction and photography is generally good."
