= Shackles of Gold =

1922 film by Herbert Brenon

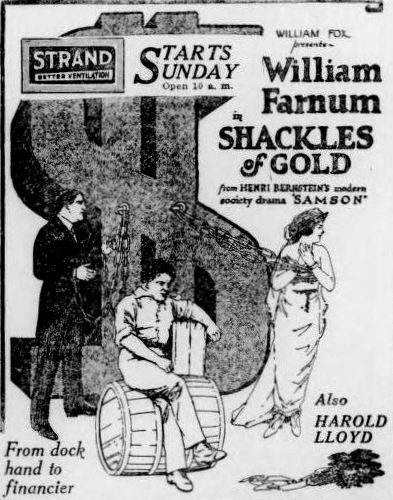
- Newspaper advertisement
- Directed by: Herbert Brenon
- Written by: Paul Sloane
- Based on: Samson by Henri Bernstein
- Starring: William Farnum; Alfred Loring; Marie Shotwell
- Cinematography: Tom Malloy
- Production company: Fox Film Corporation
- Distributed by: Fox Film Corporation
- Release date: April 20, 1922
- Running time: 60 minutes
- Country: United States
- Language: Silent (English intertitles)

Shackles of Gold is a 1922 American silent drama film directed by Herbert Brenon and starring William Farnum, Alfred Loring, and Marie Shotwell. It is an adaptation of the 1908 play Samson by Henri Bernstein with the setting moved from France to America. The screenplay involves a woman from an aristocratic but poor family who is pressured by her relatives to marry a wealthy financier.

== Plot ==
As described in a film magazine, John Gibbs (Farnum) is a dock laborer but rises to wealth by speculation in the oil market. He marries Marie (Bonillas), the daughter of Charles Van Dusen (Loring), but she consented to the marriage solely because the family fortune was depleted and to maintain their social standing. John bears this quietly until he learns that his wife has gone to a cabaret with another man. John turns on his former friend, Donald Valentine (Griffin), and, while breaking him becomes, ruins himself. However, through the strange workings of the human mind, he wins the love of his wife.

== Cast ==
- William Farnum as John Gibbs
- Alfred Loring as Charles Van Dusen
- Marie Shotwell as Mrs. Van Dusen
- Myrta Bonillas as Marie, Their Daughter
- Wallace Ray as Harry, Their Son
- Carlton Griffin as Donald Valentine
- Ellen Cassidy as Elsie Chandler
- Henry Carvill as William Hoyt

== Censorship ==
Before Shackles of Gold could be exhibited in Kansas, the Kansas Board of Review required the elimination of people drinking during a party, drunken men, a woman on a table, women sitting on men's laps, a woman on a piano with the pianists hands on her ankles, and Marie struggling against the advances of a man.

== Bibliography ==
- Goble, Alan. The Complete Index to Literary Sources in Film. Walter de Gruyter, 1999.
