= Ein Polterabend =

1955 film

- Directed by: Curt Bois
- Release date: 1955
- Country: East Germany
- Language: German

Ein Polterabend is an East German film. It was released in 1955.

== Cast ==
- Rolf Moebius as Adolf Glassbrenner
