= Dreaming Lips (1932 film) =

1932 film

- German: Der träumende Mund
- Directed by: Paul Czinner
- Written by: Carl Mayer; Paul Czinner
- Based on: Mélo by Henri Bernstein
- Produced by: Marcel Hellman
- Starring: Elisabeth Bergner; Rudolf Forster; Anton Edthofer; Margarethe Hruby
- Cinematography: Jules Kruger; René Ribault
- Edited by: Erich Schmidt
- Production companies: Pathé-Natan; Matador-Film
- Distributed by: Bavaria Film
- Release date: 13 September 1932
- Running time: 95 minutes
- Countries: France; Germany
- Language: German

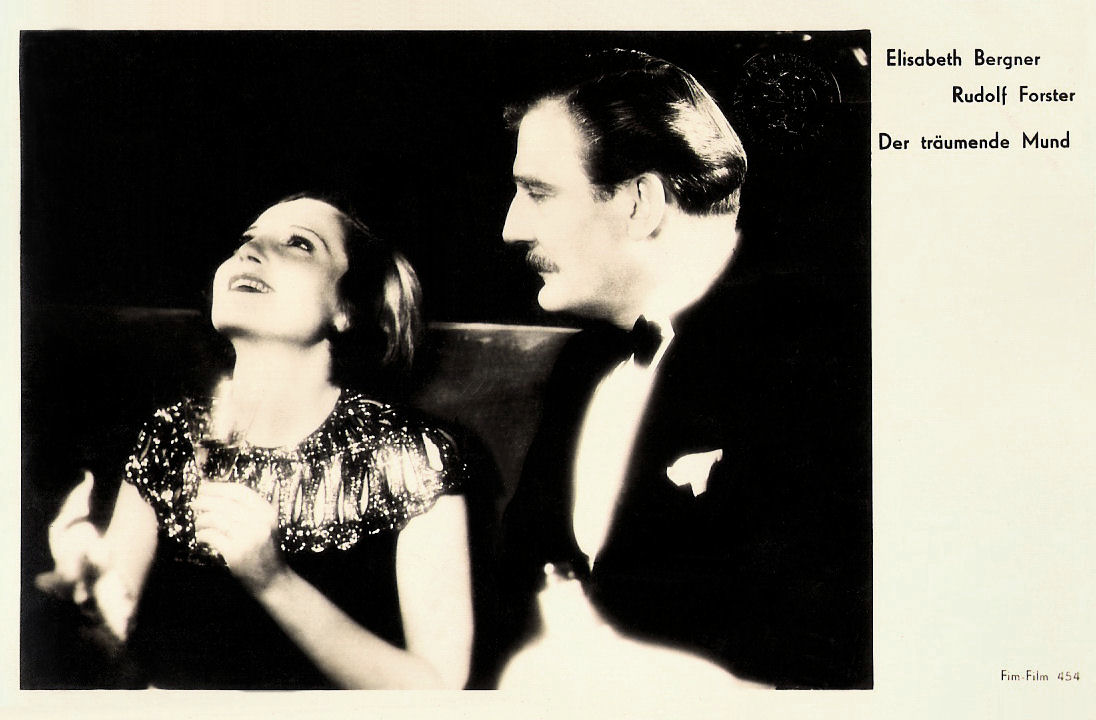
Elisabeth Bergner and Rudolph Forster

Dreaming Lips (German: Der träumende Mund) is a 1932 French-German drama film directed by Paul Czinner and starring Elisabeth Bergner, Rudolf Forster and Anton Edthofer. The film is based on the play Mélo by Henri Bernstein. As was common at the time, the film was a co-production with a separate French-language version Mélo made.

After Bergner and Czinner went into exile in Britain following the Nazi takeover, they remade the film in 1937. A further German remake was released in 1953, starring Maria Schell.

== Cast ==
- Elisabeth Bergner as Gaby
- Rudolf Forster as Michael Marsden
- Anton Edthofer as Peter
- Margarethe Hruby as Christine
- Jaro Fürth as Arzt
- Peter Kroger as Kind
- Karl Hannemann as Impresario
- Ernst Stahl-Nachbaur as Polizist
- Werner Pledath
- Gustav Püttjer
- Willi Schur
