= Husbands or Lovers (1924 film) =

1924 film

- American poster
- Directed by: Paul Czinner
- Written by: Paul Czinner; Osip Dymov (play)
- Produced by: Elisabeth Bergner; Paul Czinner
- Starring: Elisabeth Bergner; Emil Jannings; Conrad Veidt
- Cinematography: Axel Graatkjær; Reimar Kuntze
- Music by: Bruno Schulz
- Production company: Rimax-Film
- Distributed by: Dewesti-Verleih
- Release date: 22 November 1924
- Country: Germany
- Languages: Silent; German intertitles

Husbands or Lovers (German title: Nju - Eine unverstandene Frau) is a 1924 German silent film directed by Paul Czinner and starring Elisabeth Bergner, Emil Jannings and Conrad Veidt. It was shot at the Staaken and EFA Studios in Berlin. The film's art direction was by Bohumil Hes and Paul Rieth.

== Cast ==
- Elisabeth Bergner as Nju
- Emil Jannings as Ehemann
- Conrad Veidt as Der Liebhaber, ein Dichter
- Maria Bard as Kindermädchen
- Nils Edwall as Kind
- Annie Röttgen
- Margarete Kupfer
- Karl Platen
- Max Kronert
- Walter Werner
- Grete Lundt
- Maria Forescu
- Fritz Ley

== Bibliography ==
- Eric Rentschler. German Film & Literature. Routledge, 2013.
