= Jean Schopfer =

French writer and tennis player

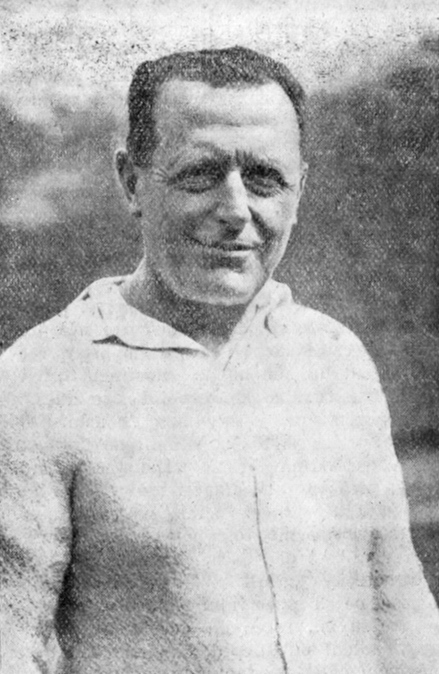
- Schopfer
- Born: 28 May 1868; Morges, Switzerland
- Died: 9 January 1931 (aged 62); Paris, France
- Education: Sorbonne; École du Louvre
- Writing career
- Pen name: Claude Anet
- Notable work: Ariane, jeune fille russe

Jean Schopfer (28 May 1868 – 9 January 1931) was a tennis player competing for France, and a writer, known under the pseudonym of Claude Anet. He reached two singles finals at the Amateur French Championships, winning in 1892 over the American player Francis Louis Fassitt, and losing in 1893 to Laurent Riboulet.

== Biography ==
Schopfer was born 28 May 1868, Morges, Switzerland.

Educated at the Sorbonne and the École du Louvre, Schopfer started writing in 1899.

=== Mayerling ===
Under the name Claude Anet, Schopfer published many books, including La Révolution Russe, written after a trip to Russia during World War I, Mayerling, based on the Mayerling Incident, and Simon Kra, a biography of tennis player Suzanne Lenglen.

His 1920 novel Ariane, jeune fille russe has been adapted into a number of films including Ariane and Love in the Afternoon.

He died on 9 January 1931 in Paris.
