= Dreaming Lips (1937 film) =

1937 British film by Paul Czinner

- Directed by: Paul Czinner
- Written by: Henri Bernstein (play); Cynthia Asquith; Margaret Kennedy; Carl Mayer
- Produced by: Max Schach; Paul Czinner
- Starring: Elisabeth Bergner; Romney Brent; Raymond Massey; Joyce Bland
- Cinematography: Lee Garmes
- Edited by: David Lean
- Music by: William Walton
- Production company: Trafalgar Film Productions
- Distributed by: United Artists
- Release date: 2 February 1937
- Running time: 94 minutes
- Country: United Kingdom
- Language: English

Dreaming Lips is a 1937 British drama film directed by Paul Czinner and starring Elisabeth Bergner, Romney Brent and Raymond Massey.

== Plot ==
The wife of a violin player in a famous orchestra, falls in love with her husband's friend and, tragically, drowns herself.

== Cast ==
- Elisabeth Bergner as Gaby Lawrence
- Raymond Massey as Miguel del Vayo
- Romney Brent as Peter Lawrence
- Joyce Bland as Christine
- Sydney Fairbrother as Mrs. Stanway
- Felix Aylmer as Sir Robert Blaker
- J. Fisher White as Dr. Wilson
- Charles Carson as Impresario
- Donald Calthrop as Philosopher
- Ronald Shiner as Friend
- Cyril Raymond as PC
- George Carney as Rescuer
- Bruno Barnabe as Rescuer

== Production ==
The film was produced by Trafalgar Film Productions with art direction by Thomas N. Morahan. It was a remake of the 1932 German film Dreaming Lips also directed by Czinner and starring Bergner which had been based on the play Mélo by Henri Bernstein. In 1953 Josef von Báky remade the film in Germany, based on the original script by Czinner and Mayer.

The script would be Mayer's last, as he would die of cancer in 1944.

Indian filmmaker Bibhuti Mitra, then a student of cinematography, served as an assistant to Czinner during the film's production.

== Reception ==
The film was well received by critics, but not as financially successful as had been hoped. Writing for The Spectator in 1937, Graham Greene gave the film a mixed review, describing it as "a shapely piece of sentiment" with a story "neat and plausible, the acting refined, the photography expensive". Greene, however, complains that its "sumptuous gloss[iness]" loses authenticity and that "there is nothing to remember when the night's over".
