= Elisabeth Bergner =

Austrian-British actress (1897–1986)

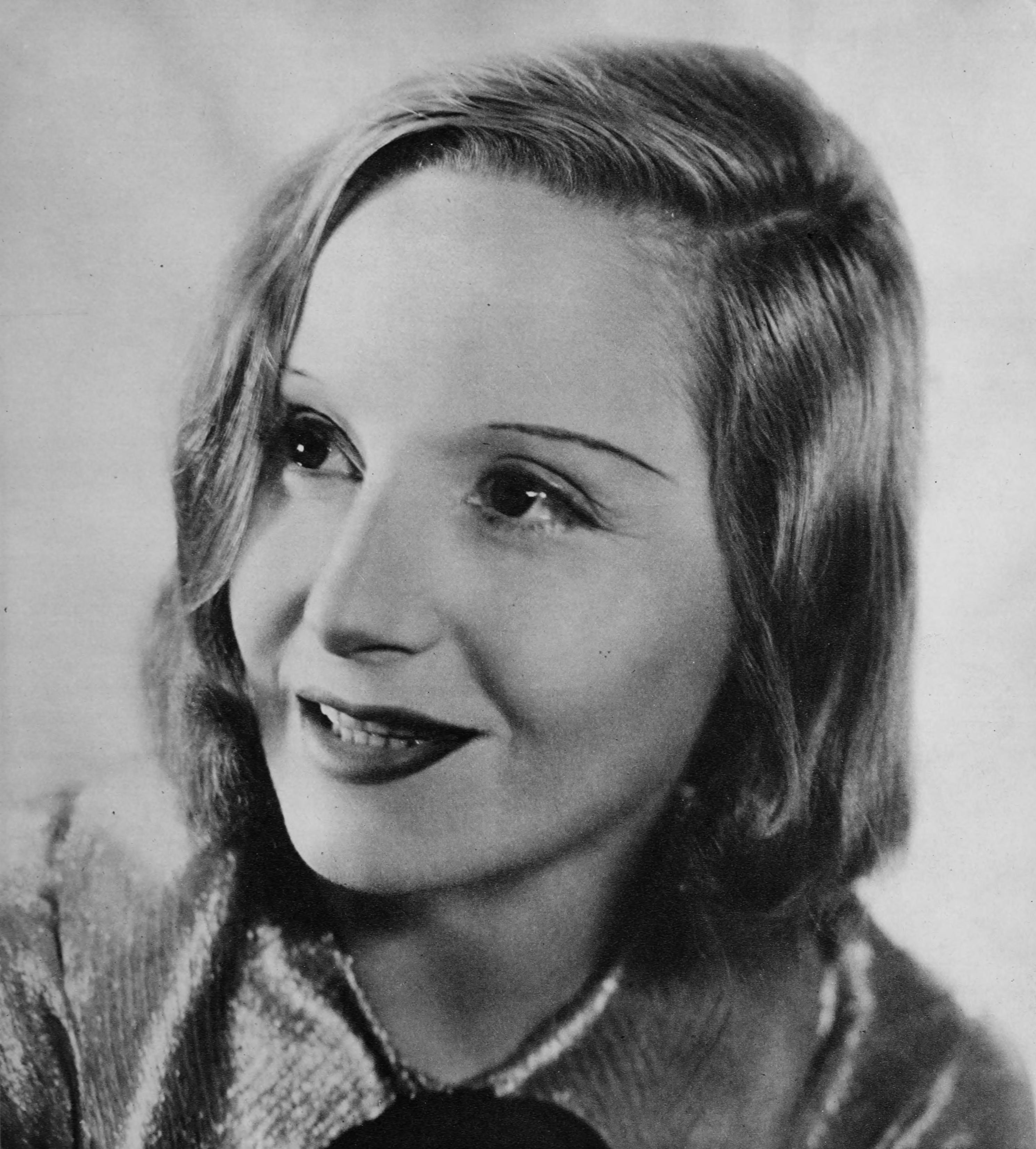
- Elisabeth Bergner, 1937
- Born: Ella vel Ettel Bergner; 22 August 1897; Drohobych, Austro-Hungarian Empire (now Drohobych, Ukraine)
- Died: 12 May 1986 (aged 88); London, England
- Occupation: Actress
- Years active: 1915–1984
- Spouse: Paul Czinner (m. 1933; died 1972)

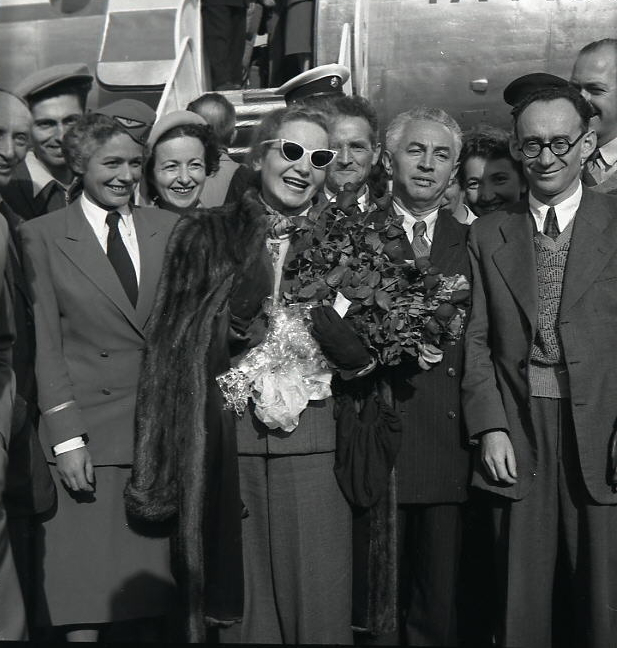
Elisabeth Bergner during her visit to Israel, 1949. Beno Rothenberg, Meitar collection, National Library of Israel

Elisabeth Bergner (22 August 1897 – 12 May 1986) was an Austrian-British actress. Primarily a stage actress, her career flourished in Berlin and Paris before she moved to London to work in films. She played the title role in The Rise of Catherine the Great (1934). Her signature role was Gemma Jones in Escape Me Never, a 1934 play written for her by Margaret Kennedy. She played Gemma, first in London and then in the Broadway debut, and in a 1935 film version for which she was nominated for the Academy Award for Best Actress. She also starred in the American film Paris Calling (1941). In 1943, Bergner returned to Broadway in the play The Two Mrs. Carrolls, for which she won the Distinguished Performance Medal from The Drama League.

== Early life ==
She was born Ella vel Ettel Bergner in Drohobych, Austro-Hungarian Empire (present-day Ukraine) to Sara Bergner (née Wagner) and Emil Bergner (né Juda Schmelke Bergner), a merchant. She grew up in a secular Jewish home. The Hebrew she heard in her childhood was associated with Yom Kippur and Pesach, and on her visits to Israel, she apologised for not knowing the language. Shortly after her birth, Bergner's family moved to Vienna. She had an older sister, Theodora, and a younger brother, Friedrich.

In 1911, she attended a private acting school and, from 1912 to 1915, she took a three-year course at the Vienna Conservatory.

== Career ==
=== 1915–1922: Early stage roles ===
In October 1915, Bergner landed a four-month contract with a theatrical company in Innsbruck, where she made her stage debut. Tired of playing small roles in Innsbruck, she wrote letters to theatrical agents and managers, asking them to hire her. Herr Reucker, director of the Schauspielhaus Zürich, traveled to Innsbruck to see her. Impressed by Bergner's talent and "enormous, expressive eyes", Reucker hired her for a season and she played several roles in his productions. In Zürich, Bergner's stage roles included Annchen in Max Halbe's Jugend and Ophelia in Reucker's production of William Shakespeare's Hamlet, starring Alexander Moissi as Prince Hamlet. She also played Rosalind in Shakespeare's As You Like It, Lulu in Frank Wedekind's Earth Spirit, Elfie in Wederkind's Schloss Wetterstein, and Cassandra in the Franz Werfel adaptation of Euripides' The Trojan Women. She also posed for sculptor Wilhelm Lehmbruck, who fell in love with her.

Bergner went back to Vienna in 1918 and played in August Strindberg's Miss Julie and Arnold Zweig's Die Sendung Semaels. In 1921, she won critical acclaim for her performance in Hugo von Hofmannsthal's Der Schwierige. As a child Bergner had been tutored by J. L. Moreno, and in the early 1920s in Vienna she was occasionally involved with his Stegreiftheater (Theatre of Spontaneity). Following a successful guest appearance in Germany, she moved to Berlin and worked with Felix Hollaender and Max Reinhardt at the Deutsches Theater and with Victor Barnowsky at the Lessing Theater. At the Lessing, Bergner set a record playing Shakespeare's Rosalind in 566 consecutive performances of As You Like It.

=== 1923–1932: Silent films, plays, and first sound films ===
In 1923, she made her film debut in the German silent film The Evangelist (Der Evangelimann). She later remembered, "The first picture I made was a silent one. It was called Der Evangelimann. I was asked to see the 'rushes.' I took one look at myself. I was terrified at seeing myself on the screen. I left the projection room and have not dared see myself on the screen since." In 1924, she achieved international recognition with her portrayal of Joan of Arc in George Bernard Shaw's play Saint Joan. That same year she appeared in her second film, Husbands or Lovers (Nju), directed by her future husband, Paul Czinner. Bergner's next film was The Fiddler of Florence. A critic wrote of Bergner, "When she plays the violin, she is pure music. When she dances, she is the dance itself." Her other successful stage roles in the 1920s were the title role in Frederick Lonsdale's The Last of Mrs. Cheyney, Tessa in Margaret Kennedy's The Constant Nymph, and Portia in Shakespeare's The Merchant of Venice. Bergner also starred in the silent films Doña Juana (1927) and Fräulein Else (1928).

Her first sound film, Ariane, was released in 1931. Bergner and Czinner then made the film Dreaming Lips (1932).

=== 1933–1940: Escape Me Never and British films ===
With the rise of Nazism, Bergner moved to London with director Paul Czinner, and they married in 1933. In November 1933, she made her English debut in Manchester in a production of the play Escape Me Never by Margaret Kennedy. The following month, she starred in the same play at the Apollo Theatre in London.

She starred as Catherine the Great in Alexander Korda's The Rise of Catherine the Great (1934), directed by her husband. The film was banned in Germany because of the government's racial policies, according to Time on 26 March 1934. Her stage work in London included The Boy David (1936) by J. M. Barrie, his last play, which he wrote especially for her.

She was nominated for an Academy Award for Best Actress for the film version of Escape Me Never (1935). She also played the role in New York City at the Shubert Theatre in the Theatre Guild production of Escape Me Never, which ran for 96 performances from 21 January to April 1935.

She repeated her stage role of Rosalind, opposite Laurence Olivier's Orlando, in the 1936 film As You Like It, the first sound film version of Shakespeare's play, and the first sound film of any Shakespeare play filmed in England. Bergner had previously played the role on the German stage, and several critics found that her accent got in the way of their enjoyment of the film, which was not a success. Bergner's other British films are Dreaming Lips (1937) and Stolen Life (1939).

She was naturalised as a British subject in 1938.

=== 1941–1948: Hollywood debut and Broadway plays ===
Bergner's first Hollywood film was Paris Calling (1941), co-starring Randolph Scott.

Bergner's most successful Broadway role was Sally Carroll in the play The Two Mrs. Carrolls, which ran for 585 performances from August 3, 1943 to February 3, 1945. In 1944, she won The Drama League's Delia Austrian Medal for Distinguished Performance for The Two Mrs. Carrolls.

In 1945, Bergner directed Czinner's Broadway production of the play The Overtons, written by Vincent Lawrence.

From 15 October to 16 November 1946, she portrayed the title role of John Webster's The Duchess of Malfi at the Ethel Barrymore Theatre.

Bergner also starred in Louis Paul's The Cup of Trembling at the Music Box Theatre.

=== 1949–1984: Later career ===
In 1954, Bergner temporarily returned to Germany, where she acted in movies and on the stage; the Berlin district of Steglitz named a city park after her. In 1973, she starred in Der Fußgänger (English title: The Pedestrian), which was nominated for an Academy Award and which won the Golden Globe for Best Foreign-Language Foreign Film of 1974. In 1980, Austria awarded her the Cross of Merit for Science and Art, and, in 1982, she won the Eleonora Duse Prize Asolo.

== Personal life ==
Bergner was married once, to Hungarian-born British writer, film director, and producer Paul Czinner, from 1933 to 1972.

=== Basis for fictional characters ===
She was the source for the story which became the 1950 Academy Award for Best Picture-winning film All About Eve albeit as the Margo Channing character not the titular Eve Harrington. According to The New York Times obituary for writer Mary Orr, Bergner had told Orr about an experience that provided her with the inspiration for the short story that gave birth to the character of Eve Harrington. "The Wisdom of Eve" appeared in Cosmopolitan in 1946. The play based on that story was the basis for Joseph L. Mankiewicz's screenplay for the film. The episode occurred when Bergner was performing in the play The Two Mrs. Carrolls. Bergner took pity on a "waif-like" young woman who stood outside the theater for days on end. She gave her a job as her secretary, and the young actress tried to "take over" Bergner's life. Bergner was also reputedly the inspiration for the character of Dora Martin in the novel Mephisto by Klaus Mann.

== Death ==
She later moved to London, where she died, aged 88, from cancer. She was cremated at Golders Green Crematorium on 15 May 1986, where she is commemorated with an oval memorial tablet in the West Cloister.

== Acting technique ==
In 1935, Bergner was asked about her approach to a character's psychology. She replied, "I have no such approach unless it is subconscious. Instinct is the only thing that matters. Instinct is always right. The moment one begins to say: 'What would she have thought here?' or 'What would she have done there?' acting becomes mechanical."

== Partial filmography ==
- The Evangelist (1924) – Magdalena
- Husbands or Lovers (1924) – Nju
- The Fiddler of Florence (1926) – Renée
- Liebe (1927) – Herzogin von Langeais
- Doña Juana (1928) – Doña Juana
- Fräulein Else (1929) – Else Thalhof
- Ariane (1931) – Ariane Kusnetzowa
- Dreaming Lips (1932) – Gaby
- The Rise of Catherine the Great (1934) – Catherine
- Escape Me Never (1935) – Gemma Jones
- As You Like It (1936) – Rosalind
- Dreaming Lips (1937) – Gaby Lawrence
- Stolen Life (1939) – Sylvina Lawrence / Martina Lawrence
- 49th Parallel (1941) – Anna (replaced by Glynis Johns) (scenes deleted)
- Paris Calling (1941) – Marianne Jannetier
- The Happy Years of the Thorwalds (1962) – Frau Thorwald
- Cry of the Banshee (1970) – Oona
- Strogoff (1970) – Marfa Strogoff
- The Pedestrian (1973) – Frau Lilienthal
- The Pentecost Outing (1978) – Margarete Johannsen
- High Society Limited (1982) – Else

== See also ==
- List of Academy Award winners and nominees from Germany
- List of actors with Academy Award nominations

== Bibliography ==
- Anne Jespersen: Toedliche Wahrheit oder raffinierte Taeuschung. "Die Frauen in den Filmen Elisabeth Bergners" in Michael Omasta, Brigitte Mayr, Christian Cargnelli (eds.): Carl Mayer, Scenarist: Ein Script von ihm war schon ein Film – "A script by Carl Mayer was already a film". Synema, Vienna 2003; ISBN 978-3-901644-10-8 (in German and English)
