= Paul Czinner =

American film director (1890–1972)

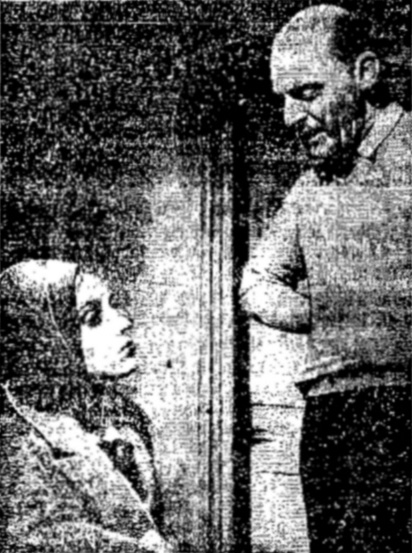
- Paul Czinner with Elisabeth Bergner
- Born: 30 May 1890; Vienna, Austria-Hungary (now Austria)
- Died: 22 June 1972 (aged 82); London, England
- Education: University of Vienna
- Occupations: Film director, screenwriter
- Years active: 1919–1966
- Spouse: Elisabeth Bergner (m. 1933–1972, his death)

Paul Czinner (30 May 1890 – 22 June 1972) was a Hungarian-born British writer, film director, and producer.

== Biography ==
Czinner was born to a Jewish family in Budapest, Austria-Hungary.

After studying literature and philosophy at the University of Vienna, he worked as a journalist. From 1919 onward, he dedicated himself to work for the film industry as a writer, director and producer. Czinner became engaged to actress Gilda Langer in early 1920. Shortly after their engagement, Langer succumbed to the Spanish flu; she died on 31 January 1920.

In 1924, he offered the leading role in his film Nju to Elisabeth Bergner. They became partners. Both were Jewish, and after the Nazi Party under Adolf Hitler began to persecute Jews in Germany, the couple fled. They went first to Vienna, and then on to London, where they were married. Despite Czinner's homosexuality, theirs was a happy union, and one which enriched them personally and professionally. In 1934, he realised his film Catherine the Great, with his wife playing the main role. The film was not shown in Germany.

They emigrated to the United States in 1940, and worked on Broadway. After the end of World War II, they returned to England, where Czinner successfully adapted numerous operas—such as Don Giovanni and Der Rosenkavalier—to film.

== Death ==
Czinner died on 22 June 1972 in London, aged 82.

== Selected filmography ==
- Inferno (1919)
- Husbands or Lovers (1924)
- Jealousy (1925)
- The Fiddler of Florence (1926)
- Doña Juana (1927)
- Fräulein Else (1929)
- The Way of Lost Souls (released in USA as The Woman He Scorned) (1929)
- Ariane (1931)
- Dreaming Lips (1932)
- Ariane, Russian maid (1932)
- Mélo (1932)
- Catherine the Great (1934)
- Escape Me Never (1935)
- As You Like It (1936)
- Dreaming Lips (1937)
- Stolen Life (1939)
- Don Giovanni film from the Salzburg performance, based on Mozart's opera. (1954)
- The Bolshoi Ballet (1958)
- The Royal Ballet (1959)
- Der Rosenkavalier, based on the opera by Richard Strauss (1962)
- Romeo and Juliet, ballet film starring Rudolf Nureyev and Margot Fonteyn (1966)
