= The Rose of Stamboul =

The Rose of Stamboul (German:Die Rose von Stambul) may refer to:

- The Rose of Stamboul (operetta), a 1916 operetta by Leo Fall
- The Rose of Stamboul (1919 film), a silent German film
- The Rose of Stamboul (1953 film), a 1953 West German film adaptation directed by Karl Anton
