= Hannerl and Her Lovers =

Hannerl and Her Lovers may refer to:

- Hannerl and Her Lovers, 1913 novel by Austrian writer Rudolf Hans Bartsch
- Hannerl and Her Lovers (1921 film), German silent comedy based on Bartsch's novel
- Hannerl and Her Lovers (1936 film), Austrian comedy based on Bartsch's novel
