= Love (1927 German film) =

1927 film

- Elisabeth Bergner and Hans Rehmann
- Directed by: Paul Czinner
- Written by: Paul Czinner
- Based on: La Duchesse de Langeais; 1834 novel by Honoré de Balzac
- Starring: Elisabeth Bergner; Agnes Esterhazy; Elza Temary
- Cinematography: Adolf Schlasy; Arpad Viragh
- Music by: Willy Schmidt-Gentner
- Production company: Phoebus Film
- Distributed by: Phoebus Film
- Release date: January 1927
- Country: Germany
- Languages: Silent; German intertitles

Love (German: Liebe) is a 1927 German silent film directed by Paul Czinner and starring Elisabeth Bergner, Agnes Esterhazy and Elza Temary.

== Cast ==
- Elisabeth Bergner as Herzogin von Langeais
- Agnes Esterhazy as Gräfin Serezy
- Elza Temary as Gräfin Fontaine
- Olga Engl as Die alte Prinzessin
- Else Heller as Äbtissin
- Hans Rehmann as Marquis von Montriveau
- Paul Otto as Marquis von Ronquerolles
- Nicolai Wassiljeff as Der junge Prinz
- Arthur Kraußneck as Vitzdom von Pamier
- Leopold von Ledebur as Herzog von Navarra
- Jaro Fürth as Herzog von Grandlieu
- Hans Conrady as Ein Mönch
- Karl Platen as Diener

== Bibliography ==
- Eisner, Lotte H. The Haunted Screen: Expressionism in the German Cinema and the Influence of Max Reinhardt. University of California Press, 2008.
