= Albert Steinrück =

German actor (1872–1929)

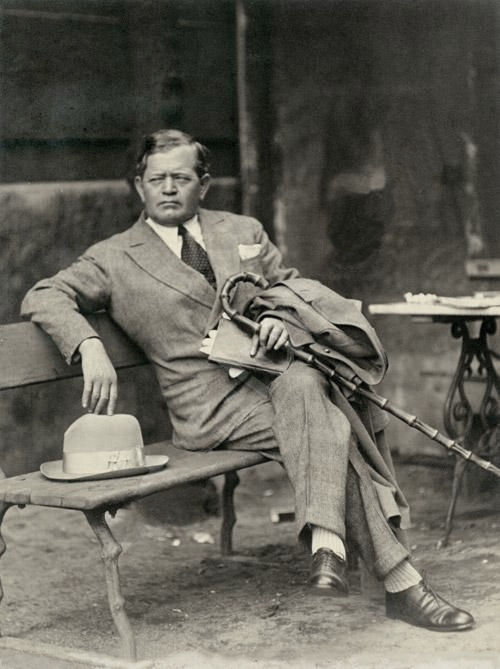
- Born: 20 May 1872; Wetterburg, Waldeck, German Empire
- Died: 10 February 1929 (aged 56); Berlin, Weimar Republic
- Resting place: Zehlendorf Cemetery
- Occupation: Actor
- Years active: 1892–1929

Albert Steinrück (20 May 1872 – 10 February 1929) was a German stage and film actor of the silent era. He appeared in more than 80 films between 1910 and 1929. He starred in the 1923 film The Treasure, which was directed by Georg Wilhelm Pabst. He was also a leading role in the German expressionist 1920 film The Golem, in which he plays a rabbi.

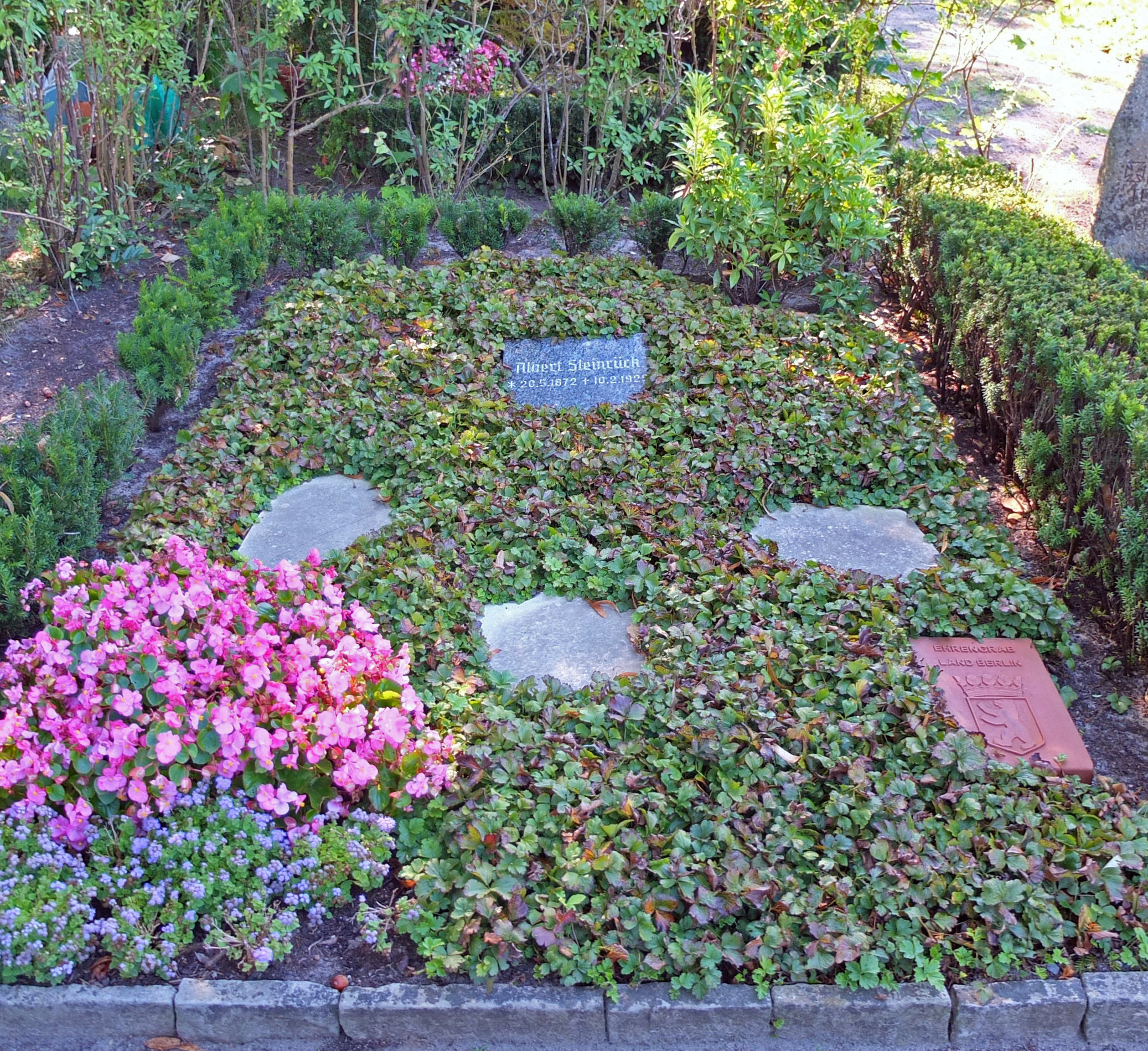
Grave of Albert Steinrück at the Zehlendorf Cemetery in Berlin.

== Selected filmography ==
- Japanisches Opfer (1910) - Ein Delegierter
- Der Volkstyrann (1913) - Gouverneur
- Prinz Keo. Der Raub der Mumie (1919) - Professor Scrupello
- Die sterbende Salome (1919) - Bildhauer
- Das Milliardentestament (1920)
- The Girl from Acker Street (1920–1921, part 1, 3) - Vater Schulze
- Catherine the Great (1920)
- Madame Récamier (1920)
- The Mayor of Zalamea (1920) - Pedro Crespo
- The Golem: How He Came into the World (1920) - Der Rabbi Löw / Rabbi Loew
- The Guilt of Lavinia Morland (1920) - John Morland
- Berlin W. (1920)
- Ana Bolena (1920)
- The Closed Chain (1920)
- Schieber (1921) - Max Modersohn
- Der Streik der Diebe (1921)
- Burning Country (1921)
- Exzellenz Unterrock (1921) - Neaumarchais
- Das Mädchen, das wartet (1921)
- Die Geschichte von Barak Johnson (1921)
- The Hotel of the Dead (1921, part 1) - Senator Petersen
- Night and No Morning (1921) - Zirkusdirektor Mortera
- Sappho (1921) - Andreas
- The Vulture Wally (1921) - Stromminger, der Höchstbauer
- The Convict of Cayenne (1921)
- Das Geheimnis der Santa Margherita (1921)
- The Passion of Inge Krafft (1921) - Fürst Wladimir Gagarine
- Perlen bedeuten Tränen (1921)
- Das Haus in der Weichselgasse (1921)
- Fridericus Rex (1922–1923, part 1, 2, 4) - Friedrich Wilhelm I.
- The Blood (1922)
- The Circle of Death (1922) - Lebedow, Reitknecht
- The Flight into Marriage (1922) - Onkel
- Monna Vanna (1922) - Andreas Buonacorsi
- Die Nacht der Medici (1922)
- Die Küsse der Ira Toscari (1922)
- The Treasure (1923) - Svetocar Badalic, Master Foundryman
- The Red Rider (1923)
- Scheine des Todes (1923)
- The Merchant of Venice (1923) - Tubal
- Girls You Don't Marry (1923)
- The Weather Station (1923) - Der Wetterwart
- Helena (1924) - Priamos
- The House by the Sea (1924) - Werber
- Decameron Nights (1924) - King Algarve
- Slaves of Love (1924)
- Die Tragödie der Entehrten (1924)
- Die Schuld (1924)
- The Golden Calf (1925) - Floris
- Reveille: The Great Awakening (1925)
- Hedda Gabler (1925) - Gerichtsrat Brack
- In the Valleys of the Southern Rhine (1925, part 1, 2) - Philipp Steinherr
- Goetz von Berlichingen of the Iron Hand (1925)
- The House of Lies (1926) - Jan Werle
- Three Cuckoo Clocks (1926) - Mason
- Sword and Shield (1926) - Friedrich Wilhelm I, König von Preußen
- The Eleven Schill Officers (1926) - French commander
- Superfluous People (1926) - Bronsa
- Aftermath (1927) - Der Gutsvogt
- The Sporck Battalion (1927) - Forstmeister von Rüdiger
- Lützow's Wild Hunt (1927) - Beethoven
- Love Affairs (1927)
- One Against All (1927)
- Children's Souls Accuse You (1927) - Kommerzienrat Enzenberg
- Venus im Frack (1927)
- Regine (1927) - Regines Vater
- The Convicted (1927)
- The Bordello in Rio (1927) - Paul Schröder (Plumowski)
- At the Edge of the World (1927) - Der Müller
- Light Cavalry (1927) - Rabbi Süß
- § 182 minderjährig (1927)
- Le roman d'un jeune homme pauvre (1927) - Le grand-père
- The Girl from Abroad (1927)
- The Prince of Rogues (1928) - Leyendecker
- Majestät schneidet Bubiköpfe (1928) - Handwerker
- Die Sandgräfin (1928)
- Autumn on the Rhine (1928) - Kallborn, Wirt
- The Tsarevich (1929) - The Czar
- Die von der Scholle sind (1928) - Moser
- The Last Fort (1929) - Lensky, Kommandant
- Fräulein Else (1929) - Von Dorsday
- Asphalt (1929) - Hauptwachtmeister Holk
- The Crimson Circle (1929) - Froyant
