= Love Me and the World Is Mine =

1927 film by Ewald André Dupont

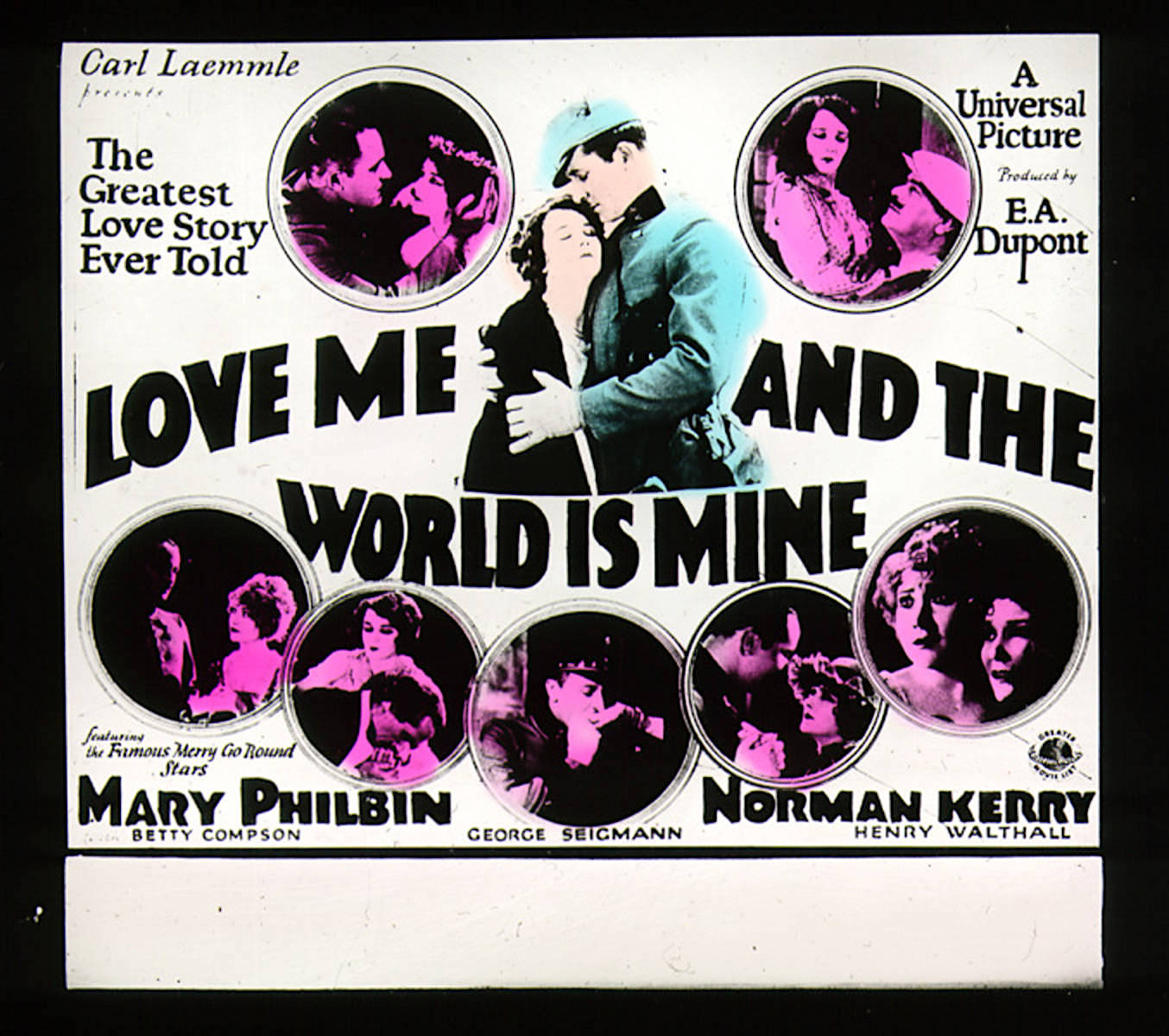
- Lantern slide
- Directed by: Ewald André Dupont
- Written by: Imre Fazekas; Albert DeMond; Walter Anthony; Paul Kohner
- Based on: Die Geschichte von der Hannerl und ihren Liebhabem by Rudolf Hans Bartsch
- Produced by: Carl Laemmle
- Starring: Mary Philbin; Norman Kerry; Betty Compson
- Cinematography: Jackson Rose
- Edited by: Edward L. Cahn; Daniel Mandell
- Music by: Sidney Jones
- Distributed by: Universal Pictures
- Release dates: February 9, 1928 (New York City); March 4, 1928 (U.S.)
- Running time: 60 minutes
- Country: United States
- Language: Silent (English intertitles)
- Budget: $350,000

Love Me and the World Is Mine is a 1928 American silent romantic film directed by Ewald André Dupont (E.A. Dupont) and released by Universal Pictures. It was adapted for the screen by Imre Fazekas, Albert DeMond, Walter Anthony, and Paul Kohner based on the 1913 novel titled Die Geschichte von der Hannerl und ihren Liebhabem by Rudolf Hans Bartsch.

== Plot ==
Hannerl (Philbin) is a young woman growing up in Old Vienna. She falls in love with two men: A young army officer who can provide her love and security and an old wealthy man who can provide her a high-class life. She doesn't know who she wants to spend her life with, but must make her decision.

== Cast ==
- Mary Philbin as Hannerl
- Norman Kerry as Von Vigilatti
- Betty Compson as Mitzel
- Henry B. Walthall as Van Denbosch
- Mathilde Brundage as Mrs. Van Denbosch
- Charles Sellon as Mr. Thule
- Martha Mattox as Mrs. Thule
- George Siegmann as Porter
- Robert Anderson as Orderly
- Albert Conti as Billie
- Emily Fitzroy as The Porter's Wife
- Charles Puffy as Coachman

== Preservation ==
Love Me and the World Is Mine is considered completely extant with prints held by the Cinematheque Royale de Belgique in Brussels and the Danish Film Institute in Copenhagen.

== See also ==
- Hannerl and Her Lovers (1921)
- Hannerl and Her Lovers (1936)
