= His Late Excellency =

His Late Excellency (German:Die selige Exzellenz) may refer to:

- His Late Excellency (1927 film), a German silent film
- His Late Excellency (1935 film), a German film
