= Cultural depictions of George II of Great Britain =

There are several extant statues of the king: in Golden Square, Soho, London; at Royal Square, St Helier, Jersey; and at the Royal Naval College, Greenwich, London.

On screen, King George II of Great Britain has been portrayed by:

- Alexander Ekert in the 1921 German silent film Exzellenz Unterrock, based on a novel by Adolf Paul
- Olaf Hytten in the 1936 film The Last of the Mohicans
- Martin Miller in the 1948 film Bonnie Prince Charlie
- Ivan Triesault in the 1951 film Dick Turpin's Ride
- Arthur Young in the 1954 biopic John Wesley
- Mathias Wieman in the 1957 film Robinson soll nicht sterben (The Girl and the Legend)
- Richard Harris in the 1989 film King of the Wind
- Clive Swift in the 1999 BBC TV drama series Aristocrats
- Richard Griffiths in the 2011 adventure film Pirates of the Caribbean: On Stranger Tides
