= Mascotte (1920 film) =

1920 film

- Scene from a film
- Directed by: Felix Basch
- Written by: Felix Basch
- Based on: Mascotte by Leo Leipziger
- Produced by: Paul Davidson
- Starring: Gretl Basch; Paul Biensfeldt; Hanni Reinwald
- Cinematography: Frederik Fuglsang
- Music by: Giuseppe Becce
- Production company: PAGU
- Distributed by: UFA
- Release date: 13 February 1920
- Country: Germany
- Languages: Silent; German intertitles

Mascotte is a 1920 German silent film directed by Felix Basch and starring Gretl Basch, Paul Biensfeldt, and Hanni Reinwald.

The film's sets were designed by the art director Kurt Richter.

== Cast ==
- Gretl Basch as Ballhaus-Anna
- Felix Basch as Lebemann
- Mizzi Schütz as Mutter Hanke
- Paul Biensfeldt as Diener
- Kurt Ehrle
- Fred Immler
- Rudolf Klix
- Marga Lindt
- Sophie Pagay
- Hermann Picha
- Hanni Reinwald
- Anna von Palen
- Emmy Wyda

== Bibliography ==
- Bock, Hans-Michael; Bergfelder, Tim, eds. (2009). The Concise Cinegraph: Encyclopaedia of German Cinema. New York: Berghahn Books. ISBN 978-1-57181-655-9.
