= Panic in Chicago =

1931 film directed by Robert Wiene

- French release poster
- Directed by: Robert Wiene
- Written by: Friedrich Raff; Julius Urgiß
- Based on: Panic in Chicago by Robert Heymann
- Produced by: Leo Meyer
- Starring: Olga Chekhova; Hans Rehmann; Ferdinand Hart; Hilde Hildebrand
- Cinematography: Willy Goldberger
- Edited by: Paul May
- Music by: Michael Krausz
- Production company: Deutsche Lichtspiel-Syndikat
- Distributed by: Deutsche Lichtspiel-Syndikat
- Release date: 23 June 1931
- Running time: 77 minutes
- Country: Germany
- Language: German

Panic in Chicago (German: Panik in Chicago) is a 1931 German crime film directed by Robert Wiene and starring Olga Chekhova, Hans Rehmann and Ferdinand Hart. It was based on the novel Panic in Chicago by the German writer Robert Heymann. The film was shot at the Staaken Studios with sets designed by the art director Erwin Scharf. It premiered at the Palast-am-Zoo in Berlin on 23 June 1931.

== Synopsis ==
In 1930s mob-dominated Chicago, a leading gangster poses as a respectable member of society.

== Cast ==
- Olga Chekhova as Florence Dingley
- Hans Rehmann as Taglioni
- Ferdinand Hart as Percy Boot
- Hilde Hildebrand as Susy Owen
- Lola Chlud as Fay Davis
- Ernst Dumcke as Kommissar Renard
- William Trenk as Kriminalbeamter Charles
- Gerhard Bienert as Tom
- Friedrich Ettel as King
- Franz Weber as John
- Ernst Wurmser as Robert
- Arthur Bergen as Spieler

== Bibliography ==
- Jung, Uli; Schatzberg, Walter (1999). Beyond Caligari: The Films of Robert Wiene. Berghahn Books. ISBN 978-1-57181-156-1.
