= Henry Stuart (actor) =

Swiss actor (1885–1948)

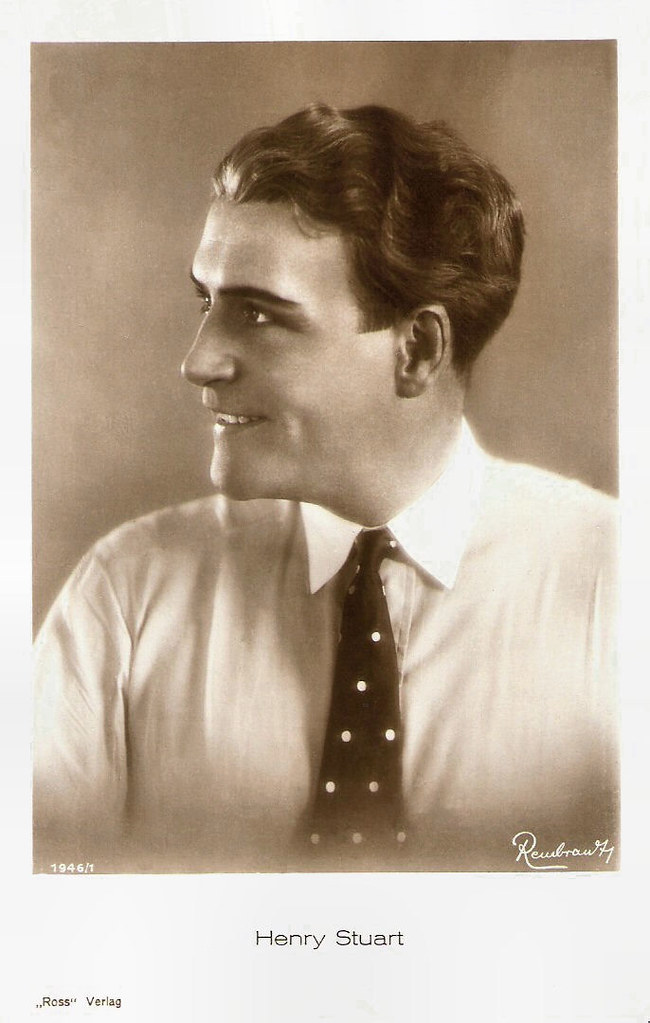
- Born: 1 February 1885; Cairo, Egypt
- Died: 26 January 1948 (aged 62); Zollikon, Switzerland
- Other name: Court Eduard Henry Hess
- Occupation: Actor
- Years active: 1923-1943 (film)

Henry Stuart (1 February 1885 – 26 January 1948) was a Swiss film actor known for his work in Germany. Stuart was born in Cairo as son of a Swiss doctor, but educated in Britain. He attended the Academy of Fine Arts in Munich, intending to become a painter. After moving into the German film industry following the First World War, Stuart played a number of prominent supporting roles in productions such as Joyless Street (1925). Stuart's film career largely ended with the arrival of sound, and he worked increasingly on the stage. His final film appearance was a small role in the Nazi agfacolor epic Münchhausen (1943).

== Filmography ==
- A Glass of Water (1923)
- Joyless Street (1925)
- The Wig (1925)
- The Adventures of Sybil Brent (1925)
- Wrath of the Seas (1926)
- The Man in the Fire (1926)
- Two and a Lady (1926)
- The Street of Forgetting (1926)
- Derby (1926)
- Unter Ausschluß der Öffentlichkeit (1927)
- The Girl Without a Homeland (1927)
- Flirtation (1927)
- The Woman with the World Record (1927)
- Excluded from the Public (1927)
- The Beggar from Cologne Cathedral (1927)
- Wenn Menschen reif zur Liebe werden (1927)
- Sajenko the Soviet (1928)
- Give Me Life (1928)
- Der Ring der Bajadere (1928)
- Favorite of Schonbrunn (1929)
- Scandal in Baden-Baden (1929)
- The Right to Love (1930)
- Germanin (1943)
- Münchhausen (1943)

== Bibliography ==
- Isenberg, Noah William: Weimar Cinema: An Essential Guide to Classic Films of the Era. Columbia University Press, 2009.
- Treuner, Hermann: Filmkünstler: Wir über uns selbst. Sibyllen-Verlag, 1928 (online).
