= Excluded from the Public =

1927 film

- Directed by: Conrad Wiene
- Written by: Johannes Brandt; Joseph Than
- Produced by: Arthur Ziehm
- Starring: Werner Krauss; Maly Delschaft; Vivian Gibson
- Cinematography: Rudolph Maté
- Music by: Hansheinrich Dransmann
- Production company: Internationaler Film Exchange
- Distributed by: Internationaler Film Exchange
- Release date: February 1927
- Running time: 87 minutes
- Country: Germany
- Languages: Silent; German intertitles

Excluded from the Public (German: Unter Ausschluß der Öffentlichkeit) is a 1927 German silent drama film directed by Conrad Wiene and starring Werner Krauss, Maly Delschaft and Vivian Gibson. It was shot at the Staaken Studios in Berlin. The film's sets were designed by the art director Robert A. Dietrich.

== Cast ==
- Werner Krauss as Ibrahim Hulam
- Maly Delschaft as Eva - die Schwester
- Vivian Gibson as Anita - die Tochter
- William Dieterle as Fritz Sehring
- Henry Stuart as Hans v. Romberg
- Ida Wüst as Bibiana de la Motte
- Jakob Tiedtke as Eberhard v. Schlenk
- Julius Falkenstein as Herr v. Bisam
- Karl Elzer as Charly
- Grete Schmidt
- Hermann Picha
- Dodge Sisters

== Bibliography ==
- Paul Matthew St. Pierre. Cinematography in the Weimar Republic: Lola Lola, Dirty Singles, and the Men Who Shot Them. Rowman & Littlefield, 2016.
