= Chance the Idol =

1927 film by Graham Cutts

- Directed by: Graham Cutts
- Written by: Henry Arthur Jones (play); Curt J. Braun
- Produced by: Harry R. Sokal
- Starring: Jack Trevor; Agnes Esterhazy; Harry Liedtke; Gertrud de Lalsky
- Cinematography: Theodor Sparkuhl
- Music by: Felix Bartsch
- Production company: H.R. Sokal Film
- Distributed by: National Film
- Release date: 1927
- Country: Germany
- Languages: Silent; German intertitles

Chance the Idol (German: Die Spielerin) is a 1927 German silent film directed by Graham Cutts and starring Jack Trevor, Agnes Esterhazy and Harry Liedtke. It was based on a play by Henry Arthur Jones. Cutts was working in Germany at the time for Gainsborough Pictures.

== Cast ==
- Jack Trevor as Golding
- Agnes Esterhazy as Ellen
- Harry Liedtke as Ryves
- Gertrud de Lalsky as Lady Nowell
- Philipp Manning as Mr. Farndon
- Dene Morel as Alan
- Frida Richard as Mrs. Farndon
- Elza Temary as Sylvia

== Bibliography ==
- Cook, Pam. Gainsborough Pictures. Cassell, 1997.
- Wood, Linda. British Films 1927-1939. British Film Institute, 1986.
