= Scandal in Baden-Baden =

1929 film

- Directed by: Erich Waschneck
- Written by: George Froeschel (novel); Hans Rameau
- Produced by: Alfred Zeisler
- Starring: Brigitte Helm; Ernst Stahl-Nachbaur; Henry Stuart
- Cinematography: Friedl Behn-Grund
- Music by: Artur Guttmann
- Production company: UFA
- Distributed by: UFA
- Release date: 18 January 1929
- Running time: 74 minutes
- Country: Germany
- Languages: Silent; German intertitles

Scandal in Baden-Baden (German: Skandal in Baden-Baden) is a 1929 German silent drama film directed by Erich Waschneck and starring Brigitte Helm, Ernst Stahl-Nachbaur and Henry Stuart. It was shot at the Babelsberg Studios in Berlin and on location in Baden-Baden. The film's sets were designed by the art director Erich Czerwonski.

== Cast ==
- Brigitte Helm as Vera Kersten
- Ernst Stahl-Nachbaur as John Leeds
- Henry Stuart as Baron Egon von Halden
- Lili Alexandra as Fernande Besson
- Leo Peukert as Edgar Merck
- Rudolf Biebrach as Juwelier Hess
- Albert Karchow as Makler Urban
- Walter von Allwoerden as Sekretär
- Anna von Palen as Wirtin
- Adolf E. Licho as Agent
- Otto Kronburger as Kommissar

== Bibliography ==
- Hans-Michael Bock and Tim Bergfelder. The Concise Cinegraph: An Encyclopedia of German Cinema. Berghahn Books.
