= The Curse of Silence =

1922 film

- German: Der Fluch des Schweigens
- Directed by: Felix Basch
- Written by: Max Jungk; Julius Urgiß
- Starring: Hermann Thimig; Arnold Korff
- Cinematography: Julius Balting
- Production company: Basch-Freund
- Distributed by: UFA
- Release date: 5 January 1922
- Country: Germany
- Languages: Silent; German intertitles

The Curse of Silence (German: Der Fluch des Schweigens) is a 1922 German silent drama film directed by Felix Basch and starring Hermann Thimig and Arnold Korff. The film's sets were designed by the art director Hans Sohnle.

== Cast ==
In alphabetical order

- Felix Basch
- Gretl Basch
- Ernst Gronau
- Arnold Korff
- Sophie Pagay
- Maria Peterson
- Hermann Picha
- Emil Rameau
- Mizzi Schütz
- Lotte Stein
- Grete Steinlen
- Hermann Thimig
