= Checkmate (1931 film) =

1931 film directed by Georg Asagaroff

- Directed by: Georg Asagaroff
- Written by: Curt J. Braun
- Produced by: Jacob Brodsky
- Starring: Gerda Maurus; Hans Rehmann; Trude Berliner
- Cinematography: Karl Hasselmann
- Music by: Will Meisel
- Production company: Gnom-Tonfilm
- Distributed by: Biograph-Film
- Release date: 2 June 1931
- Running time: 77 minutes
- Country: Germany
- Language: German

Checkmate (German: Schachmatt) is a 1931 German drama film directed by Georg Asagaroff and starring Gerda Maurus, Hans Rehmann, and Trude Berliner.

The film's sets were designed by the art director Alexander Ferenczy.

== Cast ==
- Gerda Maurus as Charlotte Breda, seine Verlobte
- Hans Rehmann as Stefan Bigger, Schriftsteller
- Trude Berliner as Erika, Tänzerin
- Walter Rilla as Georg Holl, Journalist
- Hans Brausewetter as Rudi Helling, Zeichner
- Sig Arno as Bolo, ein Erfinder
- Hermann Speelmans as Markutius, pensionierter Kriminalbeamter
- Hugo Werner-Kahle as Untersuchungsrichter
- Viktor Schwannecke as Defense lawyer
- Bernhard Goetzke as 1. Kommissar
- Gerhard Bienert as 2. Kommissar
- Hugo Fischer-Köppe as Stromer
- Geza L. Weiss as Caesar

== Bibliography ==
- Bock, Hans-Michael; Bergfelder, Tim, eds. (2009). The Concise Cinegraph: Encyclopaedia of German Cinema. New York: Berghahn Books. ISBN 978-1-57181-655-9.
