= The Man Without Love =

1929 film

- Directed by: Guido Brignone
- Written by: Alexandre Dumas (play Kean); Lothar Knud Frederik; Hans H. Zerlett
- Produced by: Victor Skutezky
- Starring: Gustav Diessl; Ágnes Eszterházy; Harry Hardt
- Cinematography: Willy Winterstein
- Production company: Hom-Film
- Distributed by: Süd-Film
- Release date: 1 November 1929
- Running time: 125 minutes
- Countries: France; Germany
- Languages: Silent; French intertitles

The Man Without Love (German: Der Mann, der nicht liebt) is a 1929 French-German silent drama film directed by Guido Brignone and starring Gustav Diessl, Ágnes Eszterházy, and Harry Hardt. It is based on the play Kean by Alexandre Dumas.

It was shot at the Johannisthal Studios in Berlin and on location in the Swiss resort town of St. Moritz. The film's sets were designed by the art director Heinrich Richter.

== Cast ==
- Gustav Diessl as Mérone, ein Schauspieler
- Ágnes Eszterházy as Elena
- Harry Hardt as Richard, deren Gatte
- Alexander Murski as Elenas Vater
- Daisy D'Ora as Aline
- Max Gülstorff as Gaillard, Alines Onkel
- Pino Bradamante as St. Croche, Alines Verlobter
- Valerie Boothby as Yvonne, Mérones Geliebte
- Suzanne Delmas as Ginette, ein Apachenmädchen
- Alexej Bondireff as Pitou
- Nico Turoff as Pierre
- Carla Bartheel as Suze
- Suzanne Bianchetti as Duchesse de Rogall
- Colette Darfeuil as Yvonne

== Bibliography ==
- Klossner, Michael (2002). The Europe of 1500–1815 on Film and Television: A Worldwide Filmography of Over 2550 Works, 1895 Through 2000. Jefferson, NC: McFarland. ISBN 978-0-7864-1223-5.
