= The Rose of Stamboul (operetta) =

Operetta in three acts by Leo Fall

- Operetta by Leo Fall
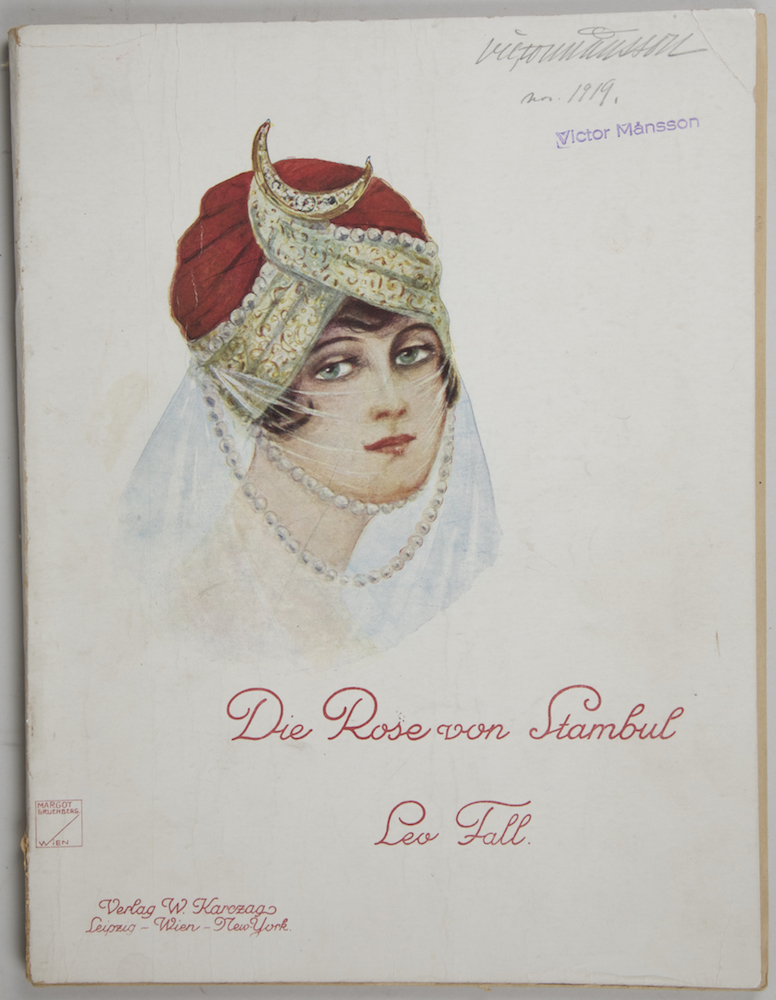
- Cover of the vocal score
- Native title: Die Rose von Stambul
- Librettist: Julius Brammer; Alfred Grünwald
- Premiere: 2 December 1916; Theater an der Wien, Vienna

The Rose of Stamboul (original German: Die Rose von Stambul) is a 1916 operetta in three acts by Austrian composer Leo Fall with a libretto by Julius Brammer and Alfred Grünwald. The work premiered on 2 December 1916 at the Theater an der Wien in Vienna.

The story centers around Achmed Bey, a young Turkish man who wishes to reform Turkish society. Not wanting to embarrass his politician father, Bey publishes his reform plans in French under the pseudonym "André Léry". The book becomes a bestseller among Turkish women. Later, a marriage is arranged between Achmed Bey and Kondja Gül. On their wedding night, however, Gül confesses to her husband that she can never love him, as she has fallen in love with the author André Léry.

The 1919 silent film The Rose of Stamboul by German film makers Felix Basch and Arthur Wellin was based on the operetta. In 1953 the operetta was adapted into a musical film, also called The Rose of Stamboul, by West German film maker Karl Anton.
