= Moritz Moszkowski =

German composer, pianist and teacher (1854–1925)

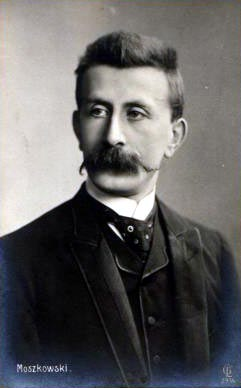
- Moszkowski, c. 1880

Background information
- Born: 23 August 1854; Breslau, Prussia
- Died: 4 March 1925 (aged 70) Paris, France
- Genres: Classical, Romantic era
- Occupations: Pianist; composer
- Instrument: Piano

Moritz Moszkowski (Polish: Maurycy Moszkowski; 23 August 1854 – 4 March 1925) was a German-Polish composer, pianist, and teacher. (Note: Encyclopædia Britannica states that he was "German" born while other sources call him Jewish, for instance, Lewis Stevens in Composers of classical music of Jewish descent.) His brother Alexander Moszkowski was a famous writer and satirist in Berlin.

Ignacy Paderewski said: "After Chopin, Moszkowski best understands how to write for the piano, and his writing embraces the whole gamut of piano technique." Although less known today, Moszkowski was well respected and popular during the late nineteenth century.

== Life and career ==
He was born in Breslau, Kingdom of Prussia (now Wrocław, Poland), into a wealthy Polish-Jewish family whose parents had come to Breslau from Pilica, near Zawiercie, in 1854. He was an ardent Jew at a time when many Jews downplayed their Jewishness. He showed early talent while very young, beginning his musical training at home until 1865, when his family moved to Dresden. There he continued his piano studies at the conservatory. He moved to Berlin in 1869 to continue his studies first at the Julius Stern Conservatory, where he studied piano with Eduard Franck and composition with Friedrich Kiel, and then at Theodor Kullak's Neue Akademie der Tonkunst, where he studied composition with Richard Wüerst and orchestration with Heinrich Dorn. There he became close friends with the Scharwenka brothers, Xaver and Philipp. In 1871 he accepted Kullak's offer to become a teacher in his academy; as he was also a more than competent violinist, he sometimes played first violin in the orchestra.

In 1873, Moszkowski made his first successful appearance as a pianist, and soon began touring the nearby cities in order to gain experience and establish his reputation. Two years later he was already playing his piano concerto on two pianos with Franz Liszt at a matinée before a selected audience invited by Liszt himself. (Note: This composition was the Piano Concerto in B minor Op. 3, which only received its orchestral premiere in January 2014. The E major Concerto Op. 59, a work composed and dedicated to Josef Hofmann, was published in 1899. It was about this time that Moszkowski's works were first published, such as the first set of Spanish Dances Op. 12, originally written for piano duet and later orchestrated by Philipp Scharwenka, who arranged the violin parts, and Valentin Frank (1858–1929).)

Retaining his post as a teacher at the Berlin conservatory from 1875, (Note: Moszkowski retained his post as a teacher at the conservatory for twenty five years.) he had among his pupils Frank Damrosch, Joaquín Nin, Ernest Schelling, Joaquín Turina, Carl Lachmund, Bernhard Pollack, Ernst Jonas, Wilhelm Sachs, Helene von Schack, Albert Ulrich and Johanna Wenzel. Moszkowski then travelled successfully throughout Europe with the reputation of being an exceptional concert pianist and brilliant composer, having also gained some recognition as a conductor. In 1884, Moszkowski married the younger sister of pianist and composer Cécile Chaminade, Henriette Chaminade, with whom he had a son named Marcel and a daughter named Sylvia. By the mid-1880s, Moszkowski began suffering from a neurological problem in his arm and gradually diminished his recital activity in favor of composing, teaching and conducting.

In 1887, he was invited to London where he had the chance to introduce many of his orchestral pieces. There he was awarded honorary membership of the Royal Philharmonic Society. Three years later his wife left him for the poet Ludwig Fulda and a divorce was issued two years later.

In 1897, famous and wealthy, Moszkowski moved to Paris, where he lived on rue Nouvelle with his son and daughter. In 1906, he lost his 17-year-old daughter Sylvia while his son was engaged in the French army. In Paris, he was frequently sought after as a teacher, and was always generous in investing his time on aspiring musicians. Among his Parisian students were Sidney Dietch, Vlado Perlemuter, Thomas Beecham (who took private lessons in orchestration with him on the advice of André Messager in 1904), Josef Hofmann (of whom he claimed once that there was nothing anyone could teach him), Wanda Landowska, and, informally, Gaby Casadesus. In the summer he rented a villa near Montigny-sur-Loing owned by the French novelist and poet Henri Murger.

In 1899, the Berlin Academy elected him a member. He was many times invited by piano manufacturers to appear in the United States to show off their pianos, but despite being offered massive fees, he always refused.

In 1908, by the age of 54, Moszkowski had already become a recluse as he began to suffer from poor health. His popularity began to fade and his career slowly went into decline. He stopped taking composition pupils because "they wanted to write like artistic madmen such as Scriabin, Schoenberg, Debussy, Satie ...".

His last years he spent in poverty for he had sold all his copyrights and invested the whole lot in German, Polish and Russian bonds and securities, which were rendered worthless on the outbreak of the war. Two of his former pupils, Josef Hofmann and Bernhard Pollack, came to his aid. Through the intervention of Pollack, who sent new piano arrangements of Moszkowski's opera Boabdil to Peters Publishing House in Leipzig, he collected an extra 10,000 francs camouflaged as royalties besides a gift of 10,000 marks and personal donations of 10,000 marks from Hofmann and 5,000 marks from himself. On 21 December 1921, when he was ill and heavily in debt, his friends and admirers arranged a grand testimonial concert on his behalf at Carnegie Hall, involving 15 grand pianos on stage. Ossip Gabrilowitsch, Percy Grainger, Josef Lhévinne, Elly Ney, Wilhelm Backhaus and Harold Bauer were among the performers, and Frank Damrosch conducted (Paderewski telegrammed his apologies). (Note: Moszkowski was certainly influential in having Paderewski publish his early piano pieces.) The concert netted US$13,275 (the equivalent of US$187,793.67 in May 2017), with one part transferred to the Paris branch of the National City Bank of New York in order to provide immediate relief from his financial problems, and an annuity purchased at the Metropolitan Life Insurance Company, whereby he would receive US$1,250 annually for the rest of his life. (Note: The sum was equivalent to 15,000 francs, with the first monthly payment arranged for 1 March 1925.)

However, Moszkowski's illness lingered and he died from stomach cancer on 4 March 1925, before the supply of funds could reach him. The money raised went instead to pay his funeral expenses and to his wife and son.

== Works ==
Despite the balance and limpidity of his playing and his technique, Moszkowski's work aroused the enthusiasm of admirers throughout Europe. He was well known in his pianistic repertoire, but it was in his own compositions that he was more admired. (Note: His early works show the influence of Frédéric Chopin, Felix Mendelssohn, and in particular Robert Schumann, a composer who later would mould Moszkowski's own style, which clearly shows Schumann's subtle sense of the instrument and its capabilities.) His music rapidly became a sensation, but he also had legitimate success in major works for the stage and the concert hall.

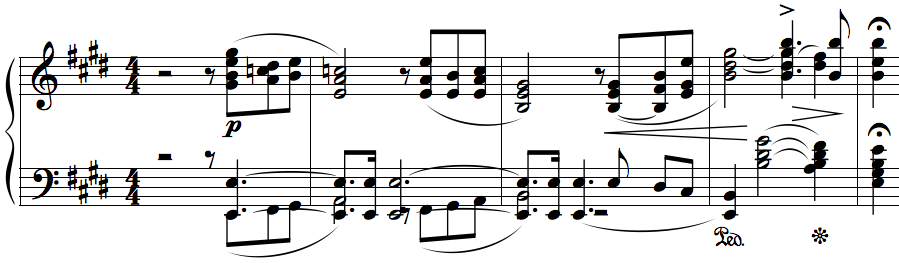
The orchestral opening to his Second Piano Concerto.

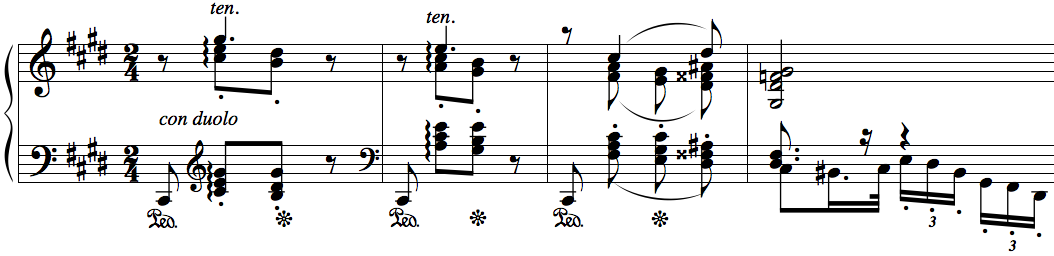
In the second movement, the piano plays a variation of the main melody.

Moszkowski was quite prolific, composing over two hundred small-scale piano pieces, which brought him much popularity – notably his set of Spanish Dances Op. 12, for piano duet (later arranged for solo piano, and for orchestra by Philipp Scharwenka). (Note: The Spanish Dance No. 5 (Bolero) is played by a salon trio in a scene from the David Lean film Brief Encounter.)

His early Serenade, Op. 15, was world-famous and appeared in many guises, including the song Liebe, kleine Nachtigall. Today he is probably best known for his fifteen Études de Virtuosité, Op. 72, which have been performed by virtuoso pianists such as Vladimir Horowitz and Marc-André Hamelin. Ilana Vered made the first complete recording in 1970. Many of his small but brilliant piano pieces, such as Étincelles (Sparks), are used as encore performances at the end of classical concerts.

He also wrote larger scale works including two piano concertos (one in B minor, Op. 3, in 1874, only rediscovered in 2011 and published in 2013, and the much better known Concerto in E major, Op. 59, from 1898), a Violin Concerto in C major, Op. 30, three orchestral suites (Opp. 39, 47, 79), and a symphonic poem Jeanne d'Arc, Op. 19. His opera Boabdil der letzte Maurenkönig, Op. 49, on the historical theme of the capture of Granada, premiered at the Berlin Court Opera on 21 April 1892, and appeared in Prague and New York City the following year. It did not stay in the repertoire, but its ballet music was very popular for a number of years. He wrote the three-act ballet Laurin, which premiered in Berlin in 1896.

== Recordings ==
Concerto No. 2 in E major (Op. 59), 1st movement
Neil O'Doan, with Nico Snel conducting the Seattle Philharmonic

Concerto No. 2 in E major (Op. 59), 2nd movement

Concerto No. 2 in E major (Op. 59), 4th movement

Ilana Vered made the first complete recording of Moszkowski's Études de Virtuosité, Op. 72, in 1970.

Seta Tanyel recorded three volumes of Moszkowski's solo piano works from 1993 to 1998, issued concurrently on Hyperion/Helios records and Collins Classics.

Ian Hobson released the first volume of a projected complete traversal of Moskowski's solo piano music, on Toccata Classics. Vol. 1 was released in 2021. Concurrently, Toccata Classics has released recordings of Moskowski's orchestral works and piano concerti.

The Piano Concerto in E major was first recorded by Michael Ponti, and more recently by Piers Lane and Joseph Moog. The Suite in G minor for 2 violins and piano, Op. 71, has been recorded by such duos as Itzhak Perlman and Pinchas Zukerman.

=== Selected discography ===
- Moritz Moszkowski and Paderewski: The Romantic Piano Concerto, Vol. 1. (Piers Lane)
- Moritz Moszkowski and Adolf Schulz-Evler: The Romantic Piano Concerto, Vol. 68 (Ludmil Angelov)
- Moritz Moszkowski and Mieczysław Karłowicz: The Romantic Violin Concerto, Vol. 5 (Tasmin Little)
- Moritz Moszkowski: Piano Music Vol. 1, 2 & 3 (Seta Tanyel)
- Moritz Moszkowski: Piano Concerto In E major & Suite for Orchestra "From Foreign Lands". Markus Pawlik, Antoni Wit
- Moritz Moszkowski: Serenata. John McCormack, Fritz Kreisler
- Moritz Moszkowski: Vingt Petites Études, Op. 91 & Brahms: Hungarian Dances. Esther Budiardjo

== Additional Media ==
Kaila Rochelle performance of Moszkowski: Gondoliera Op. 41 in G minor

Kaila Rochelle keyboard performance of Moszkowski 20 Etudes Op.91 No.11 in C major

Kaila Rochelle keyboard performance of Moszkowski Op.77 No.4 in A minor (Inquietude)

Kaila Rochelle keyboard performance of Moszkowski 20 Etudes Op.91 No.18 in A minor

== See also ==
- Paul de Schlözer

== Bibliography ==
- Maurice Hinson, Moszkowski – 20 Short Studies Op. 91 (Alfred Masterwork Edition), Alfred Music Publishing (2002), ISBN 0739023489
- Maurice Hinton, Moszkowski – 15 virtuosic etudes: "Per aspera" Op. 72 (Masterwork Edition Series), Alfred Music Publishing (1992), ISBN 0739005391
- [Gdal Saleski], Famous musicians of Jewish origin, pp. 123–124, Bloch Pub. Co. – New York (1949)
