= Arnold Korff =

Austrian-American actor (1870–1944)

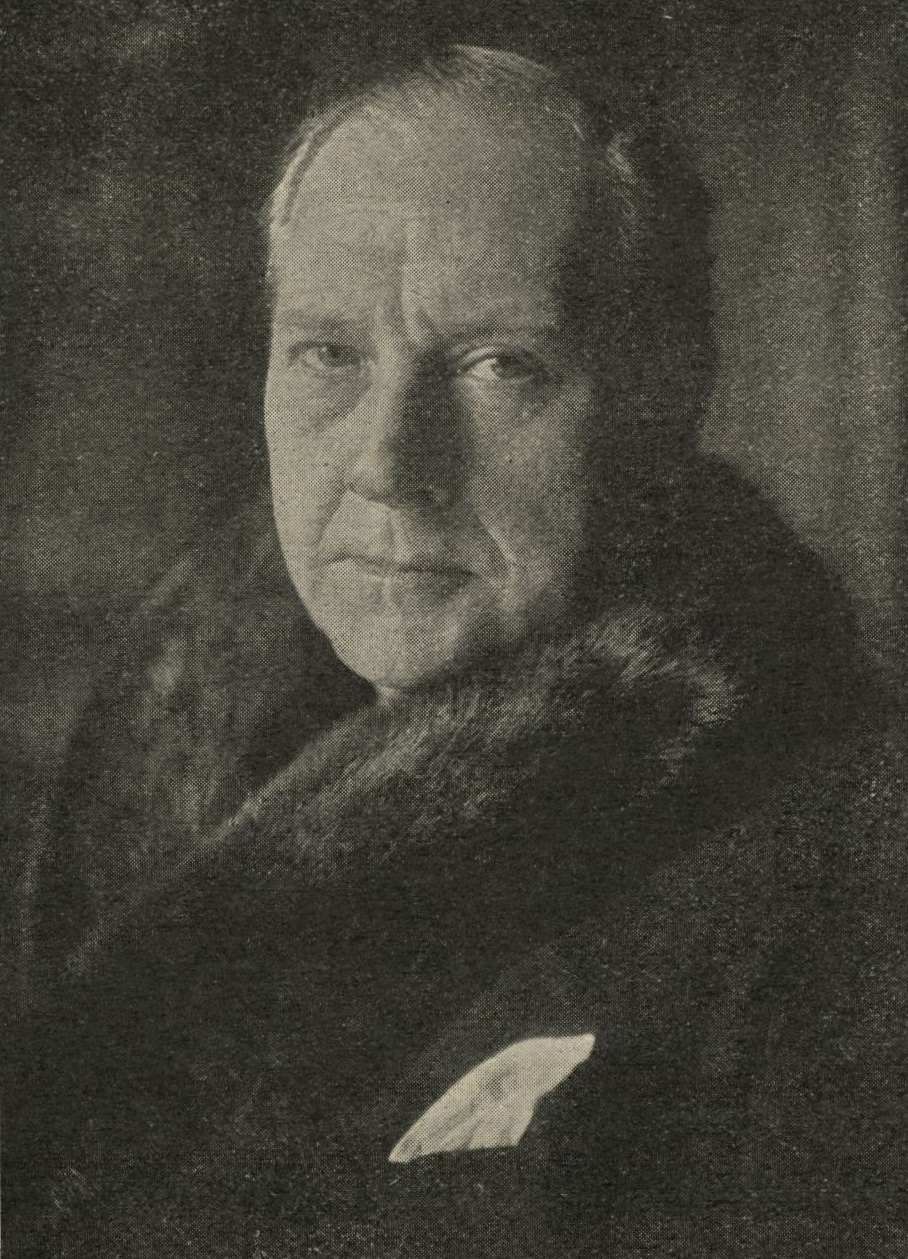
- Korff in 1927
- Born: Arnold Hirsch; 2 August 1870; Vienna, Austria-Hungary
- Died: 2 June 1944 (aged 73); New York City, U.S.
- Occupation: Actor
- Years active: 1917–1935
- Spouse: Annie Bauer (m. 1915)
- Children: 1

Arnold Korff (2 August 1870 – 2 June 1944) was an Austrian-born American actor and director. He was educated as a mechanical engineer in his native city of Vienna, and moved to the United States at the age of 18 where he worked as an engineer and a cowboy prior to transitioning into a career as an actor. He made his stage debut in Denver, Colorado in 1892 and was active on the American stage until going back to Europe in 1894. He worked at theaters in Opatija and Olomouc prior to returning to Vienna where he was a leading actor at the first the Carltheater (1897–1899) and then the Burgtheater (1899–1913). He began working as a director at the latter theater in 1905.

Korff was committed to a German-language repertory theatre in New York City in 1915–1916, and then worked at theaters in Germany, Austria, and Switzerland into the early 1930s. He also returned periodically to the New York stage in the 1920s for performances in English language plays, including starring opposite Katharine Cornell as Julius Beaufort in Margaret Ayer Barnes's hit play The Age of Innocence, which had a long run in 1928 and 1929. He simultaneously worked as a silent film actor in Germany and Austria prior to moving permanently to the United States in 1931. From 1932 to 1935, he worked as a character actor in Hollywood films. He remained active as a stage actor on Broadway until his death in 1944.

== Early life and education ==
Arnold Korff was born as Arnold Hirsch in Vienna, Austria, on 2 August 1870 on the day of the Battle of Saarbrücken during the Franco-Prussian War. Korff's parent had earlier immigrated to the United States in 1848 and become American citizens, but returned to Austria prior to Korff's birth. His parents were of Swiss origin, and he was educated in his youth in schools in Geneva and Vienna.

Before becoming an actor, Korff pursued a career as a mechanical draftsman/engineer, and was trained in this profession at the Technische Hochschule in Vienna (now TU Wien). He came to the United States at the age of 18 and worked as both a mechanical engineer and cowboy in Kansas, Colorado, and the region around the American border in the late 1880s and early 1890s. He never received any formal training as an actor.

== Early stage career ==
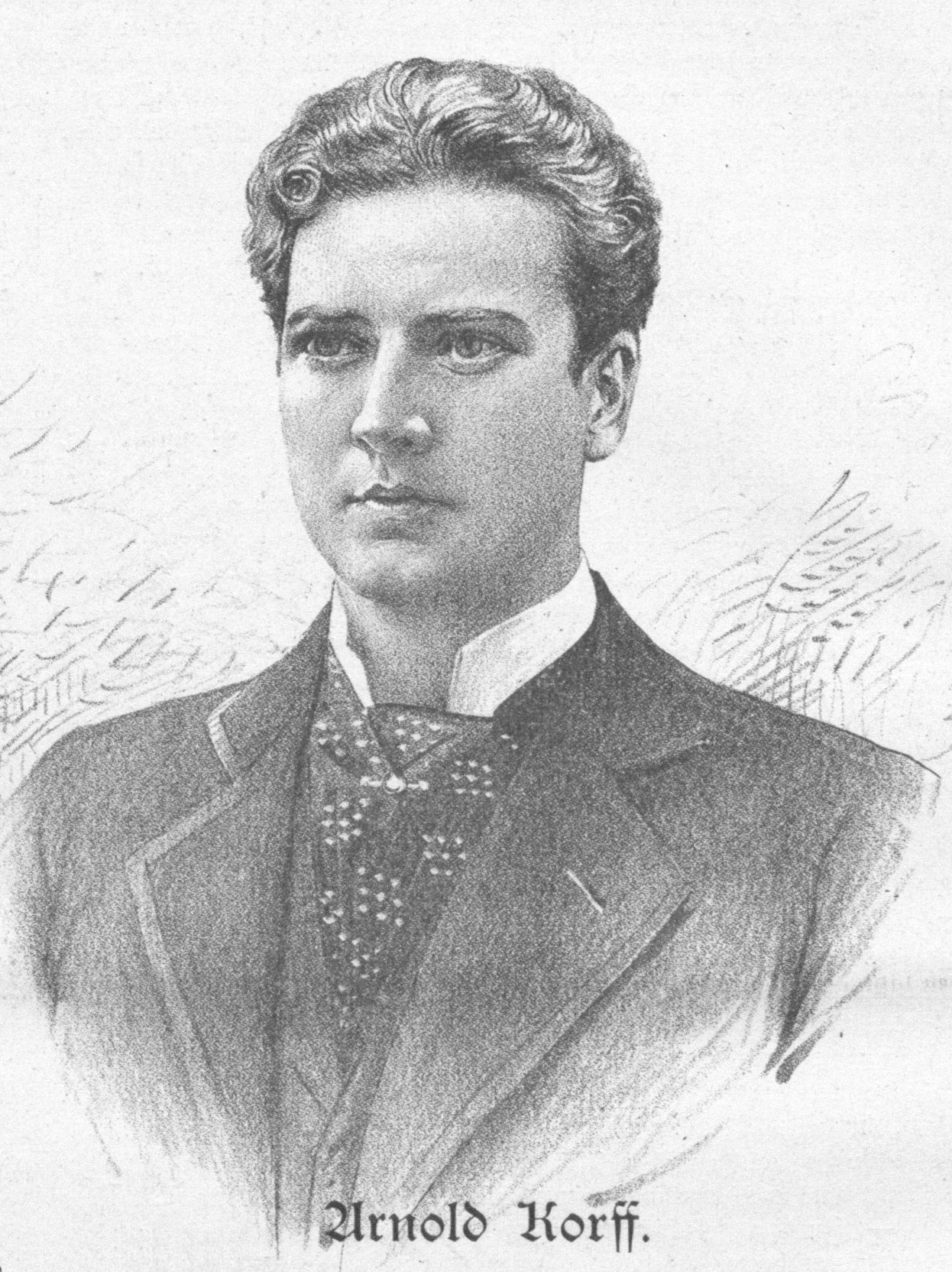
Korff portrait by Jan Vilímek, 1896

Some sources claim Korff began working as an actor in England prior to appearing on the American stage, although his obituary in The New York Times indicates that he was living and working in the United States prior to first appearing as an actor in the play Comrades in Denver, Colorado in 1892. He was active on the American stage until 1894 when he returned to Europe. In Europe he began performing in the German dramatic repertoire in minor theaters in what is today the Czech Republic and Croatia.

While working at a theater in Opatija Korff drew the attention of Leopold Müller, the administrative secretary of the Volkstheater, Vienna, and several year later Müller assisted him in earning a contract with the Carltheater in 1897. In the years prior to this he was under contract with a theater in Olomouc. Korff's contract with the Carltheater was for a three year period, but he left after just two years there to become a member of the Burgtheater in 1899. He remained under continuous contract with this theatre for many years, and began working there as a stage director as well as actor beginning in the year 1905. He also occasionally appeared as a guest actor at other European theaters, including the Neues Theater in Berlin in 1902.

Korff resigned from his post at the Burgtheater in 1913 after becoming dissatisfied with the repertoire he was being offered. His lack of training pigeonholed him into largely contemporary repertoire at this point in his career, and he was denied work in classic stage plays which he wanted to perform. He was succeeded at the Burgtheater by actor Harry Walden (1875–1921).

In September 1915 Korff made his New York debut at the Irving Place Theatre (IPT) as Friedrich in Arthur Schnitzler's 1911 play Das weite Land which was given in German. Korff was the lead actor of a German repertory company in residence at the IPT that was organized by Rudolph Christians (1869–1921). He next appeared at the IPT as the lieutenant in a new war comedy by Fritz Grünbaum and Wilhelm Sterk, Das Schloss in Polen, which premiered in October 1915. He also directed a production of Oscar Wilde's An Ideal Husband which was given at the IPT in a German language translation. In January 1916 he toured with the IPT company to John W. Albaugh's Lyceum Theatre in Baltimore, Maryland. The following month he was once again at the IPT as Grossfurst Konstantin in Alexander Brody's Lea Lyon.

Korff was once against at the Burgtheater in 1918 and 1919. performing several of his signature roles. In 1922 and 1923, he was committed to the Residenz-Theater (Berlin), and was thereafter busy with many theaters in Berlin and at the Volkstheater, Vienna for the remainder of the decade.

In late 1923 Korff returned to the United States at the invitation of Brock Pemberton to perform in several plays written by Luigi Pirandello. He performed the title role in Pirandello's Henry IV in an English-language adaptation of that work entitled The Living Mask for his Broadway debut at the 44th Street Theatre in January 1924. He returned to Broadway later that year as General Berton in C. M. S. McLellan's Leah Kleschna at the Lyric Theatre. He toured in the latter production in 1924 for performances at the Great Northern Theatre in Chicago and the Shubert Theatre in Philadelphia. By November 1924 he was back in Vienna starring in a production of Arthur Schnitzler's Comedies of Words.

In 1926 Korff appeared as a guest actor at the Schauspielhaus Zürich in a German language adaptation of Leon Gordon's White Cargo with a cast that included Peter Lorre. He was a frequent guest at that theater from the late 1910s, and maintained a house there. He befriended the author James Joyce during their overlapping time in Zürich, and Joyce stated at Korff's Zürich home at the time of the first staging in Munich of Joyce's Exiles in 1919.

In 1927 Korff returned to the United States at the behest of producer Max Reinhardt. He returned to Broadway as Quince in Reinhardt's 1927 revival of William Shakespeare's A Midsummer Night's Dream at the Century Theatre. He appeared in other Broadway productions produced by Reinhardt at the Century, including as Mammon in Hugo von Hofmannsthal's Jedermann (1927), St. Just in Georg Büchner's Danton's Tod (1927), and the Gentleman in Rheinhardt's play Peripherie (1928). At Broadway's Empire Theatre he starred as Prince Plata-Ettingen in Ferenc Molnár's Olympia (1928), and opposite Katharine Cornell as Julius Beaufort in Margaret Ayer Barnes's hit play The Age of Innocence, which had a long run in 1928 and 1929.

== Film work and later career in the United States ==
While a busy stage actor, Korff was simultaneously also a prolific silent film actor in Germany and Austria in the 1910s and 1920s, beginning with the roles of Fürst Monolescu in Diebe – und Liebe (1916) and Fürst Gisberti in Feenhände (1917). He appeared in more than 30 German silent films, and in the German sound films Olympia (1930), Liebe auf Befehl (1931), The Murder Trial of Mary Dugan (1931), and Die große Fahrt (1931).

In 1931 Korff moved to the United States where he remained for the rest of his life. He worked in Hollywood during the 1930s, appearing as a character actor in the films Secrets of the French Police (1932), Black Moon (1934), All the King's Horses (1935), Paris in Spring (1935), Three Kids and a Queen (1935), Magnificent Obsession (1935), and Alias Mary Dow (1935). He was also a prolific actor on the New York stage during the 1930s and 1940s. Some of his Broadway credits in this period included Melchior Feydak in S. N. Behrman's Biography (1932), Doctor Marius in Martin Flavin's Tapestry in Gray (1935), The Emperor in White Horse Inn (1936), Stroock in Save Me the Waltz (1938), The Magistrate in Liliom (1940), Father Benoit in The Walking Gentleman (1942), and Colonel Fiala in Thank You, Svoboda (1944).

Korff died in New York City on 2 June 1944. At the time of his death in 1944 he was starring in Lillian Hellman's The Searching Wind at the Fulton Theatre.

== Selected filmography ==
- Hannerl and Her Lovers (1921)
- Ilona (1921)
- Roswolsky's Mistress (1921)
- The Inheritance of Tordis (1921)
- The Story of a Maid (1921)
- Nights of Terror (1921)
- The Haunted Castle (1921)
- Lola Montez, the King's Dancer (1922)
- Power of Temptation (1922)
- The Curse of Silence (1922)
- Miss Julie (1922)
- Sins of Yesterday (1922)
- The Lost Shoe (1923)
- The Final Mask (1924)
- Athletes (1925)
- The Dice Game of Life (1925)
- Hussar Fever (1925)
- Den of Iniquity (1925)
- The Humble Man and the Chanteuse (1925)
- The Convicted (1927)
- Dancing Vienna (1927)
- The Woman in the Cupboard (1927)
- The Field Marshal (1927)
- The Famous Woman (1927)
- Alpine Tragedy (1927)
- Guilty (1928)
- The Market of Life (1928)
- The Green Monocle (1929)
- Diary of a Lost Girl (1929)
- The Royal Family of Broadway (1930)
- An American Tragedy (1931)
- The Murder Trial of Mary Dugan (1931)
- Secrets of the French Police (1932)
- Black Moon (1934)
- Three Kids and a Queen (1935)
