= The Treasure (1923 film) =

1923 film

- Lucie Mannheim and Hans Brausewetter
- Directed by: G. W. Pabst
- Written by: Rudolf Hans Bartsch (novel); Willy Hennings; Georg Wilhelm Pabst
- Starring: Albert Steinrück; Lucie Mannheim; Ilka Grüning
- Cinematography: Otto Tober
- Production company: Carl Froelich-Film
- Distributed by: Deulig Film
- Release date: 26 February 1923
- Running time: 80 minutes
- Country: Weimar Republic
- Languages: Silent; German intertitles

The Treasure (German: Der Schatz) is a 1923 silent German drama film directed by G. W. Pabst. It is based on a novel by Rudolf Hans Bartsch. It was Pabst's debut film as a director.

== Plot ==
The Treasure (1923)

Master Bell-founder Balthasar Hofer, his wife Anna, their daughter Beate and his journeyman Svetelenz live in a house rebuilt after its destruction by the Ottomans in 1683. The Master tells that it is rumoured that a treasure had been buried at the time. Svetelenz, who is convinced that the treasure is hidden in the house, hopes that if he finds it, he will be able to marry Beate.

Young goldsmith journeyman Arno comes to the village to work on the ornamentation of the clock just cast by the Master. Soon, he and Beate fall in love. One night, they see Svetelenz looking for the treasure with a dowsing rod. Beate convinces Arno that he should find the treasure in order to marry her. Arno deducts that a treasure dating from the Ottomans time can only be hidden in the foundations and soon finds the place where it seems to be hidden. Svetelenz tells the Master that he has found the treasure and that they should get rid of the goldsmith who also knows about it.

After trying unsuccessfully to burn Arno alive with molten metal, they send him out of the house with Beate to fetch wine while they dig out the treasure. When Arno and Beate come back home, they find the master, his wife and Svetelenz celebrating their discovery. Svetelenz offers his share of the treasure to marry Beate, but she replies that she is not for sale. Arno threatens them with a knife to have his share of the treasure but Beate tells him that he should let them have the gold and she leaves the house. After a moment of hesitation, Arno follows her and they walk away together.

The Master and his wife take the treasure to their room and Svetelenz starts digging furiously into the main pillar of the house to see whether there is some gold left. His strikes make the house collapse, burying Svetelenz, the Master and his wife with the treasure under the rubble. Arno and Beate walk out of the forest into the light.

== Cast ==
- Albert Steinrück as the Master Bell-founder
- Lucie Mannheim as his daughter, Beate
- Ilka Grüning as his wife, Anna
- Werner Krauss as Svetelenz
- Hans Brausewetter as Arno

== Musical score ==
Pabst commissioned an original musical score from Max Deutsch for the film. In structure, Deutsch's Der Schatz was crafted in two formats: a film score and a stand-alone symphonic work. The five act symphony survived because its manuscript was donated to the Deutsches Filminstitut in 1982, shortly before Deutsch died. In 2002, DeutschlandRadio Berlin collaborated with the Staatsphilharmonie Rheinland-Pfalz, conducted by Frank Strobel, to produce a record of "this extremely rare and totally unknown symphonic work". The recording became the foundation of a "synchronized restoration" of the film. As film music the "piece is scored for a theater orchestra of the kind typically found in European cinemas of the day". It brings to mind the work of Kurt Weill and Stefan Wolpe, and foreshadows Max Steiner's modernist film scores, adopting expressionist atonal twelve tone leitmotifs. Mood setting and character are developed; pianos appear throughout.

== Reception ==
Lotte H. Eisner criticised what he considered a certain stylistic inconsistency and analysed Pabst's debut film in detail:

"Here Pabst still exemplifies the German directors' delight in the Expressionist ornamental style: the bell founder's wife, who comes along hurriedly, carries an immense tray close under her head, her upper body disappears; with her puffy skirts she almost looks like one of those bulbous bells her husband is casting. And a pillar rises above the marital bed like a tree trunk, its ribs spreading out like branches - Pabst lets the camera linger for a long time in such shots. It seems surprising that an artist like Pabst should begin in this way. There is no sense of his personal style here; any director with an Expressionist bent who was looking for beautiful visual effects could have made this film. What is even more striking, however, is that Pabst, who later mastered montage with such tremendous subtlety, strings shot after shot together in a rather monotonous manner. Moreover, each shot is too lengthy, too ponderous. Every situation is treated in too much detail. This is because Pabst seeks to probe the psychological reactions of his characters precisely; this is also completely at odds with the expressionist demands that condemn all psychology."

The Lexikon des internationalen Films wrote: "A long underrated melodrama by G. W. Pabst, which in its restored version, recorded with the original music, impresses with its ambitious artistic standards. One of the great German chamber drama films, also one of the last works of Expressionism." while CineGraph found, "The dull, medieval fable, realised in an expressionist style in its decoration (Röhrig/Herlth) and cast (Steinbrück/Krauß), already echoes the motif of the intertwining of sex, money and power, which Pabst would take up again and again in his best films."
