= Jenny Hasselquist =

Swedish dancer, actress

- Jenny Hasselquist c. 1915
- Born: Jenny Matilda Elisabet Hasselquist; 31 July 1894; Stockholm, Sweden
- Died: 8 June 1978 (aged 83); Täby, Sweden
- Other name: Jenny Hasselqvist
- Occupations: Ballerina, actress, ballet teacher
- Years active: 1916–1931
- Spouses: Gösta Reuterswärd (divorced): Wilhelm Kåge

Hasselquist dancing in 1915

Jenny Matilda Elisabet Hasselquist, also spelled Hasselqvist (31 July 1894 – 8 June 1978), was a Swedish prima ballerina, film actress, and ballet teacher.

== Biography ==
Jenny Matilda Elisabet Hasselquist was born in Stockholm on 31 July 1894 to Johannes Johansson Hasselquist and Sofia Katarina Mathilda Hasselquist. She had two older brothers, Wilhelm (1887–1959), and Gerhard (1889–1950).

She attended the Swedish Opera's ballet school from 1906 and performed with the Royal Ballet from 1910. In 1913, Michel Fokine noticed her talents and ensured she obtained solo roles in La Sylphide and Cleopatra. She became a prima ballerina at the Royal Ballet in 1915.

In 1920, Hasselquist starred in Rolf de Maré's Ballets suédois in Paris. A talented dancer, she had a flair for the modern idiom. However she left de Maré after just one season, apparently dissatisfied with her potential there. She went on to play leading roles in many Swedish and some German silent films including Johan (1921), Vem dömer (1922), The Hell Ship (1923), and Aftermath (1927). She also appeared as a guest dancer in many of Europe's leading theatres including the Coliseum in London, the Théâtre des Champs-Élysées in Paris and the Deutsches Theater in Berlin.

She had her own school in Stockholm from the mid-1930s, and also taught at the Stockholm Opera's ballet school. She died on 8 June 1978 in Täby, Sweden.

== Marriages ==
Hasselquist was married twice: to the artist Wilhelm Kåge from 1918 to 1922 and to the landscape gardener Gösta Reuterswärd from 1923 to 1927.

== Selected filmography ==
- Sumurun (1920)
- The Burning Secret (1923)
- The Suitor from the Highway (1923)
- Ways to Strength and Beauty (1925)
- The Wig (1925)
- Ingmar's Inheritance (1925)
- To the Orient (1926)
- The Girl Without a Homeland (1927)
- Guilty (1928)
- Say It with Music (1929)
