= Rudolf Kayser =

German literary historian (1889–1964)

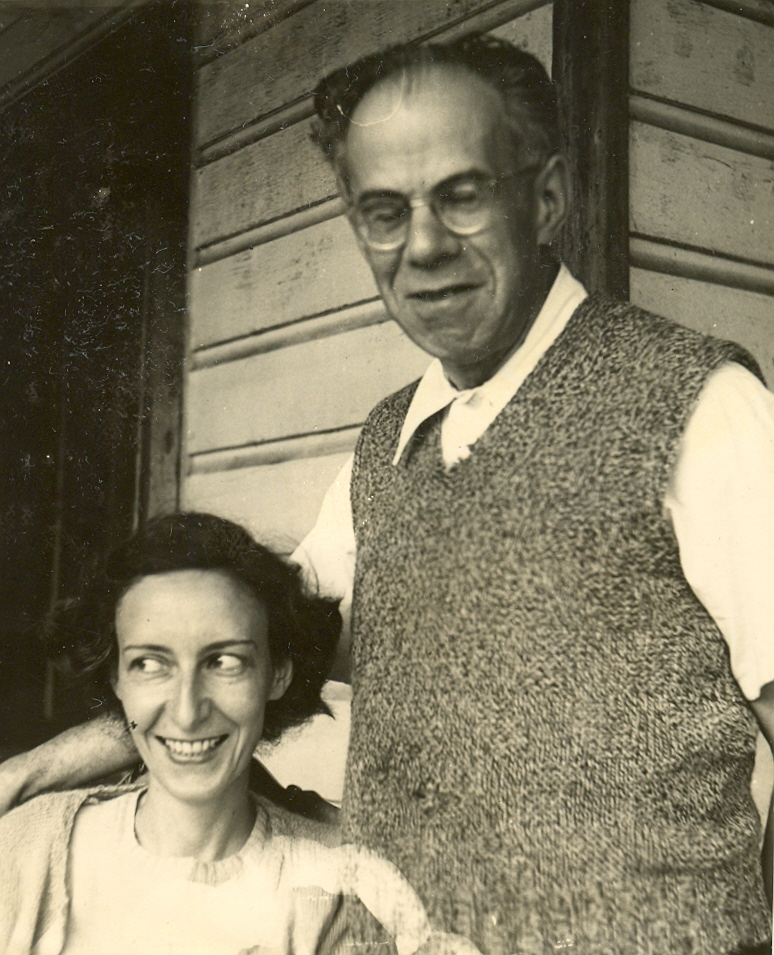
- Eva and Rudolf Kayser
- Born: 28 November 1889; Parchim, Grand Duchy of Mecklenburg-Schwerin, German Empire
- Died: 5 February 1964; New York City
- Occupations: Professor, literary historian, literary critic, editor, biographer
- Spouse: Ilse Einstein (before 1934) Eva Urgiss (m. 1936)

Rudolf Kayser (28 November 1889 — 5 February 1964) was a German literary historian.

He was born in Parchim and attended college in Berlin in 1910. He studied literature and received his doctorate with a thesis on Achim von Arnim and Clemens Brentano. As a young lecturer at the Berlin Lessing University, Kayser made his debut as a published author in 1918 with the essay "The Intellectuals and the Spiritual".

In 1919 he became an editor at the S. Fischer publishing house in Berlin, and from 1922 to 1933 he was senior editor of the Neue Rundschau. Erwin Piscator brought Kayser to the Volksbühne Berlin as dramaturgical advisor in the mid-1920s. Kayser married Ilse Einstein, stepdaughter of Albert Einstein. In 1930 Kayser wrote a biography of his famous father-in-law, using the pseudonym "Anton Reiser".

In 1932, Kayser published his best-known book, a study of the philosopher Baruch Spinoza. The Kaysers moved to the Netherlands after the Nazi rise to power. Following Ilse's death from tuberculosis in 1934, he emigrated to New York and became professor of German and European literature at Brandeis University. In 1936 he married Eva Urgiss, daughter of German screenwriter and film critic Julius Urgiß.

Rudolf Kayser died at Mount Sinai Hospital in New York City. He was 74.

His estate is kept in the Israel National Library.

== Literature ==
- Renate Heuer (Hrsg.): Lexikon deutsch-jüdischer Autoren / Archiv Bibliographia Judaica. Band 13: Jaco – Kerr. K. G. Saur, München u. a. 2005, ISBN 3-598-22693-4, S. 323–332.
- Wolfgang Kaelcke: Parchimer Persönlichkeiten. Teil 2, (= Schriftenreihe des Museums der Stadt Parchim. Heft 5). Museum der Stadt, Parchim 1997.
