= Julius Urgiß =

German screenwriter, musician and film critic (1873–1948)

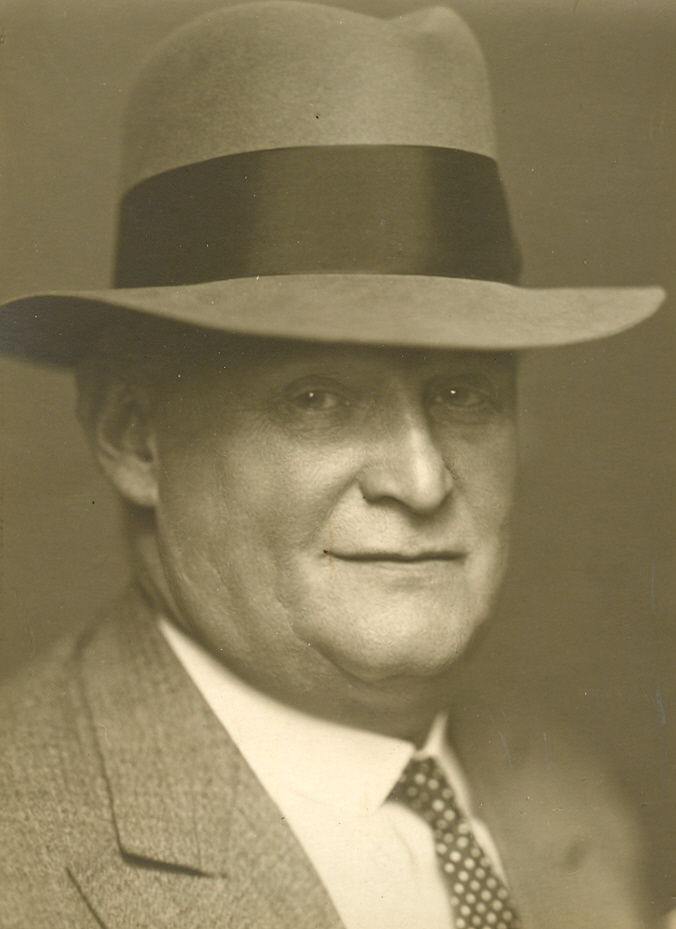
- Born: 6 August 1873; Anklam, Pomerania, Prussia, German Empire
- Died: 12 March 1948 (aged 74); New York City, New York, U.S.A.
- Occupations: Screenwriter, journalist, film critic, theatre critic, music critic, writer, biographer
- Spouse: Gerty Lewin
- Children: Eva Kayser
- Writing career
- Genres: screenplays, reviews
- Notable works: Skandal um Eva, Die Straße, The Eleven Schill Officers

Julius Urgiß (6 August 1873 – 12 March 1948) was a German-Jewish screenwriter, musician, and film critic.

He began his career as the author of various literary contributions. He worked as a senior journalist at the Berlin film journal Der Kinematograph, writing film reviews. He wrote a biography of the silent-film star Henny Porten.

In 1918, he began his career as a screenwriter. For seven years from 1919, he collaborated with Max Jungk, and in 1928 he worked with Friedrich Raff. Urgiss provided material for comedies, dramas, historical materials and literary adaptations. After the Nazis came to power in 1933, he emigrated from Germany and lived in New York until his death in 1948.

He was married to the German soprano Gerty Lewin (1879–1927). They had one daughter, Eva Agathe Urgiss (1911–1999), who married Albert Einstein's biographer and former step-son-in-law Rudolf Kayser.

== Filmography ==
- Des Vaters Schuld (1918)
- Der Trompeter von Säckingen (1918)
- Maria (1919)
- Morphium (1919)
- Die Sekretärin des Gesandten (1919)
- Störtebeker (1919)
- Hearts are Trumps (1920)
- Whitechapel (1920)
- Uriel Acosta (1920)
- Children of Darkness (1921, 2 parts)
- Der Erbe der van Diemen (1921)
- Eine Frau mit Vergangenheit (1921)
- Hannerl and Her Lovers (1921)
- Sins of Yesterday (1922)
- The Stream (1922)
- Sodoms Ende (1922)
- She and the Three (1922)
- Revenge of the Bandits (1922)
- The Curse of Silence (1922)
- The Tigress (1922)
- Miss Julie (1922)
- The Love Story of Cesare Ubaldi (1922)
- The Street (1923)
- Explosion (1923)
- The Enchantress (1924)
- The Voice of the Heart (1924)
- Nanon (1924)
- Two People (1924)
- Der Sturz ins Glück (1924)
- Bismarck (1925)
- In the Name of the Kaisers (1925)
- Lace (1926)
- The Eleven Schill Officers (1926)
- German Hearts on the German Rhine (1926)
- Women of Passion (1926)
- Der Kampf um den Mann - Batalla de damas (1926)
- Make Up (1927)
- Hurrah! I Live! (1928)
- Beware of Loose Women (1929)
- A Mother's Love (1929)
- On the Reeperbahn at Half Past Midnight (1929)
- Bockbierfest (1930)
- Josef the Chaste (1930)
- Scandalous Eva (1930)
- Der Detektiv des Kaisers (1930)
- The Widow's Ball (1930)
- Wenn Du noch eine Heimat hast (1930)
- Money on the Street (1930)
- Kohlhiesel's Daughters (1930)
- Louise, Queen of Prussia (1931)
- Panic in Chicago (1931)
- Ich will Dich Liebe lehren (1933)

== Other works ==
- Allgemeine Musiklehre (1939) Leipzig : Hörhold
