= The Way of Lost Souls =

1929 film

- Warwick Ward and Pola Negri
- Directed by: Paul Czinner
- Written by: Charles E. Whittaker
- Produced by: Paul Czinner; Charles E. Whittaker
- Starring: Pola Negri; Warwick Ward; Hans Rehmann; Cameron Carr
- Cinematography: Adolf Schlasy
- Production companies: Charles Whittaker Productions; Imperial Filmgesellschaft
- Distributed by: Warner Brothers (UK); Bayerische Film (Germany)
- Release date: 1929
- Running time: 94 minutes
- Country: United Kingdom
- Languages: Sound (Synchronized); English

The Way of Lost Souls is a sound 1929 British drama film directed by Paul Czinner and starring Pola Negri, Warwick Ward and Hans Rehmann. While the film has no audible dialog, it features a synchronized musical score, singing and sound effects on the soundtrack. The film is also known by the alternative title The Woman He Scorned. Location shooting was done in the far west of Cornwall around St Ives, Penzance and Helford. It was the first film made in Britain by Czinner.

== Premise ==
A prostitute and a lighthouse keeper fall in love.

== Cast ==
- Pola Negri - Louise
- Warwick Ward - Maxim
- Hans Rehmann - John
- Cameron Carr - Magistrate
- Margaret Rawlings - Woman
