= Thea Roland =

1932 film

- Directed by: Henry Koster
- Written by: Suzanne de Callias (novel); Hans Wilhelm
- Produced by: Georg Witt
- Starring: Lil Dagover; Hans Rehmann; Margarete Kupfer; Paul Bildt
- Cinematography: Robert Baberske; Curt Courant
- Edited by: Willy Zeunert
- Music by: Theo Mackeben
- Production company: Georg Witt-Film
- Distributed by: Aafa-Film
- Release date: 17 December 1932
- Running time: 89 minutes
- Country: Germany
- Language: German

Thea Roland or The Adventure of Thea Roland (German: Das Abenteuer der Thea Roland) is a 1932 German comedy film directed by Henry Koster and starring Lil Dagover, Hans Rehmann and Margarete Kupfer. The film marked the directorial debut of Koster, who was forced to emigrate from Germany by the Nazi party following his next film and later went on to be a leading Hollywood director. Billy Wilder may have also worked on the screenplay, although he remained uncredited.

== Partial cast ==
- Lil Dagover as Thea Roland
- Hans Rehmann as Jerry Simpson
- Margarete Kupfer as Anna
- Paul Bildt as Professor Maschke
- Walter Steinbeck as Bing
- Olly Gebauer as Irene
- Kurt Vespermann as Merkel - Journalist
- Ernst Senesch as Trainingsleiter
- Margot Landa as Elli - Blumenmädchen (flower girl)

== Bibliography ==
- Bock, Hans-Michael & Bergfelder, Tim. The Concise CineGraph. Encyclopedia of German Cinema. Berghahn Books, 2009.
- Sikov, Ed. On Sunset Boulevard: The Life and Times of Billy Wilder. Hyperion, 1999.
