= Hans Rehmann =

Swiss actor (1900–1939)

- Born: 20 March 1900; Zurich, Switzerland
- Died: 10 August 1939 (aged 39); Langenthal, Switzerland
- Occupation: Actor
- Years active: 1927–1933
- Relatives: Felix Salten (father-in-law)

Hans Rehmann (1900–1939) was a Swiss actor. He was one of the director Paul Czinner's favourite actors.

He was married to Anna Katharina Rehmann-Salten, the daughter of author Felix Salten.

== Selected filmography ==
- Love (1927)
- The Woman He Scorned (1929)
- The Flute Concert of Sanssouci (1930)
- Chasing Fortune (1930)
- Checkmate (1931)
- The Paw (1931)
- Panic in Chicago (1931)
- Yorck (1931)
- Thea Roland (1932)
- Impossible Love (1932)

== Bibliography ==
- Brinson, Charmian & Dove, Richard Dove & Taylor, Jennifer. Immortal Austria?: Austrians in Exile in Britain. Rodopi, 2007.
