= The Stream (1922 film) =

1922 film

- Directed by: Felix Basch
- Written by: Max Jungk; Julius Urgiß
- Based on: Der Strom (play) by Max Halbe
- Starring: Hermann Thimig; Eduard von Winterstein
- Cinematography: Julius Balting; Frederik Fuglsang
- Production company: Basch-Freund
- Distributed by: UFA
- Release date: April 1922
- Country: Germany
- Languages: Silent; German intertitles

The Stream (German: Der Strom) is a 1922 German silent film directed by Felix Basch and starring Hermann Thimig and Eduard von Winterstein.

The film's sets were designed by the art director Robert Neppach.

== Cast ==
- Grete Freund
- Eduard von Winterstein
- Hermann Thimig
- Felix Basch
- Jakob Tiedtke
- Ernst Gronau
- Rosa Valetti

== Bibliography ==
- Kreimeier, Klaus (1999). The Ufa Story: A History of Germany's Greatest Film Company, 1918–1945. Berkeley: University of California Press. ISBN 978-0-520-22069-0.
