= Two People (1924 film) =

1924 film

- Directed by: Hanns Schwarz
- Written by: Max Jungk; Julius Urgiß
- Based on: Two People (novel) by Richard Voss
- Starring: Olaf Fjord; Ágnes Esterházy
- Cinematography: Julius Reinwald; Arpad Viragh
- Production company: Trianon-Film
- Distributed by: Landlicht-Filmverleih
- Release date: 9 January 1924
- Country: Germany
- Languages: Silent; German intertitles

Two People (German: Zwei Menschen) is a 1924 German silent drama film directed by Hanns Schwarz and starring Olaf Fjord and Ágnes Esterházy. It was based on the 1911 novel of the same title by Richard Voss. Subsequent films versions were made in 1930 and 1952.

== Cast ==
- Olaf Fjord as Graf Rocus von Enna
- Ágnes Esterházy
- Professor Jacoby as Graf von Enna
- Toni Wittels as Gräfin von Enna
- Karl Ernst as Kaplan
- Ferdinand Martini
- Hildegard Imhof

== Bibliography ==
- Goble, Alan (1999). The Complete Index to Literary Sources in Film. Berlin: Walter de Gruyter. ISBN 978-3-11-095194-3.
