= Guilty (1928 film) =

1928 film

- Directed by: Johannes Meyer
- Written by: Ernst B. Fey; Richard Voß (play)
- Produced by: Alfred Zeisler
- Starring: Suzy Vernon; Bernhard Goetzke; Jenny Hasselqvist
- Cinematography: Curt Courant; Eugen Hrich
- Music by: Artur Guttmann
- Production company: UFA
- Distributed by: UFA
- Release date: 22 February 1928
- Running time: 99 minutes
- Country: Germany
- Languages: Silent; German intertitles

Guilty (German: Schuldig) is a 1928 German silent drama film directed by Johannes Meyer and starring Suzy Vernon, Bernhard Goetzke and Jenny Hasselqvist.

The film's sets were designed by the art director Walter Reimann.

== Cast ==
- Suzy Vernon as Maria Feld
- Bernhard Goetzke as Vater Thomas Feld
- Jenny Hasselqvist as Mutter Magda Feld
- Willy Fritsch as Lawyer Frank Peters
- Hans Adalbert Schlettow as Bordellinhaber Peter Cornelius
- Adolphe Engers as Georg Aschmann
- Max Maximilian as Clown Bumski
- Mammey Terja-Basa as Mongole
- Rudolf Biebrach
- Heinz Salfner
- Arnold Korff
- Lotte Stein

== Bibliography ==
- Bock, Hans-Michael & Bergfelder, Tim. The Concise CineGraph. Encyclopedia of German Cinema. Berghahn Books, 2009.
