= The Weather Station (film) =

1923 film directed by Carl Froelich

- Russian poster
- German: Der Wetterwart
- Directed by: Carl Froelich
- Written by: Hugo Huxhol; Kurt Lauermann
- Produced by: Carl Froelich; Erich Pommer
- Starring: Mady Christians; Albert Steinrück; Hans Brausewetter
- Cinematography: Vilmos Fenyes; Willy Gaebel; Willi Ruge; Otto Tober
- Production company: Carl Froelich-Film
- Distributed by: Decla-Bioscop; UFA
- Release date: 28 April 1923
- Country: Germany
- Languages: Silent; German intertitles

The Weather Station (German: Der Wetterwart) is a 1923 German silent film directed by Carl Froelich and starring Mady Christians, Albert Steinrück and Hans Brausewetter.

The film's sets were designed by the art directors Otto Erdmann and Hans Sohnle.

== Cast ==
- Mady Christians as lady
- Albert Steinrück as weatherman
- Hans Brausewetter as son
- Julius Falkenstein as baron
- Albert Paulig
