= Hans Brausewetter =

German actor (1899–1945)

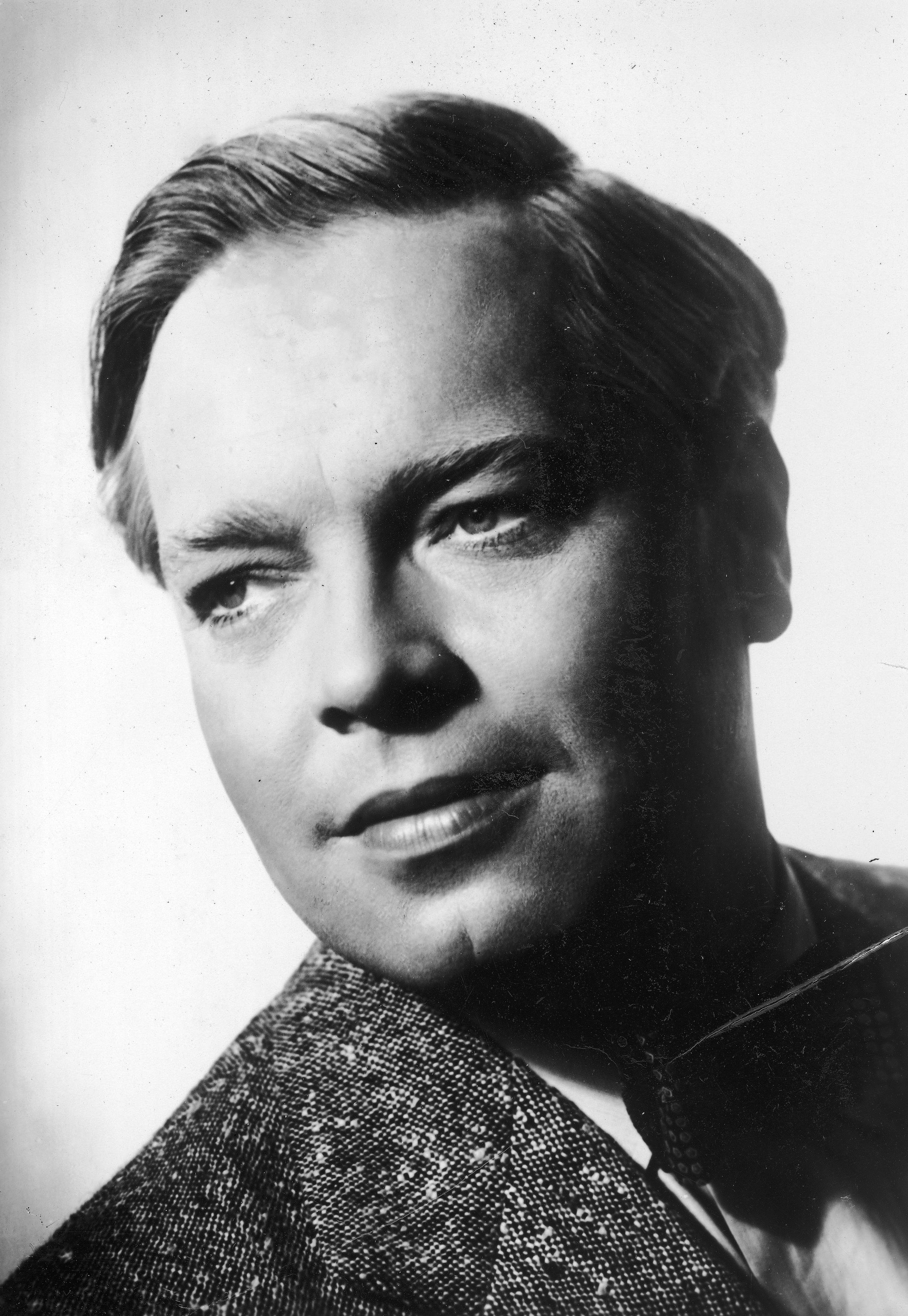
- Born: 27 May 1899; Málaga, Spain
- Died: 29 April 1945 (aged 45); Berlin, Germany
- Occupation: Actor
- Years active: 1920–1945

Hans Brausewetter (27 May 1899 – 29 April 1945) was a German stage and film actor of the silent era. He appeared in more than 130 films between 1922 and 1945. He appeared in the 1923 film The Treasure, which was directed by Georg Wilhelm Pabst. Brausewetter died from injuries sustained in a bomb blast in Berlin during the final days of the Second World War.

== Selected filmography ==
- Lumpaci the Vagabond (1922)
- The Game with Women (1922)
- The Marquis of Bolibar (1922)
- The Merchant of Venice (1923)
- The Treasure (1923)
- The Weather Station (1923)
- A Glass of Water (1923)
- Tragedy in the House of Habsburg (1924)
- The Sailor Perugino (1924)
- The Voice of the Heart (1924)
- Leap Into Life (1924)
- Debit and Credit (1924)
- The Girl on the Road (1925)
- Den of Iniquity (1925)
- The Dice Game of Life (1925)
- Goetz von Berlichingen of the Iron Hand (1925)
- The Elegant Bunch (1925)
- A Waltz Dream (1925)
- Flight Around the World (1925)
- The Clever Fox (1926)
- Superfluous People (1926)
- The Three Mannequins (1926)
- Vienna, How it Cries and Laughs (1926)
- The Adventurers (1926)
- We Belong to the Imperial-Royal Infantry Regiment (1926)
- Svengali (1927)
- Rhenish Girls and Rhenish Wine (1927)
- A Girl of the People (1927)
- Verdun: Visions of History (1928)
- The Green Alley (1928)
- The House Without Men (1928)
- Today I Was With Frieda (1928)
- The Harbour Baron (1928)
- It Attracted Three Fellows (1928)
- Dear Homeland (1929)
- The Lord of the Tax Office (1929)
- The Flute Concert of Sanssouci (1930)
- A Student's Song of Heidelberg (1930)
- The Little Escapade (1931)
- I Go Out and You Stay Here (1931)
- The Big Attraction (1931)
- The Unknown Guest (1931)
- Alarm at Midnight (1931)
- Checkmate (1931)
- The Spanish Fly (1931)
- Inquest (1931)
- Madame Makes Her Exit (1932)
- The Dancer of Sanssouci (1932)
- Gypsies of the Night (1932)
- Under False Flag (1932)
- The Victor (1932)
- Man Without a Name (1932)
- Modern Dowry (1932)
- The Eleven Schill Officers (1932)
- The Marathon Runner (1933)
- Gretel Wins First Prize (1933)
- What Men Know (1933)
- The Four Musketeers (1934)
- The Girlfriend of a Big Man (1934)
- The Flower Girl from the Grand Hotel (1934)
- The Brenken Case (1934)
- Fresh Wind from Canada (1935)
- Artist Love (1935)
- Uncle Bräsig (1936)
- When the Cock Crows (1936)
- The Abduction of the Sabine Women (1936)
- The Dreamer (1936)
- Susanne in the Bath (1936)
- Diamonds (1937)
- My Son the Minister (1937)
- Faded Melody (1938)
- Between the Parents (1938)
- Bachelor's Paradise (1939)
- A Woman Like You (1939)
- Midsummer Night's Fire (1939)
- Renate in the Quartet (1939)
- Detours to Happiness (1939)
- Small Town Poet (1940)
- Venus on Trial (1941)
- Love Me (1942)
- Back Then (1943)
- Münchhausen (1943)
- Heaven, We Inherit a Castle (1943)
- The Green Salon (1944)
- The Enchanted Day (1944)
- Love Letters (1944)
- Die Fledermaus (1946, posthumous release)
- Tell the Truth (1946, posthumous release)
- An Everyday Story (1948, posthumous release)
