= Two and a Lady =

1926 film directed by Alwin Neuß

- Directed by: Alwin Neuß
- Written by: Sven Elvestad (novel); Márton Garas; Alwin Neuß
- Produced by: Albert Pommer; Harry R. Sokal
- Starring: Agnes Esterhazy; Bernhard Goetzke; Henry Stuart; Karl Platen
- Cinematography: Károly Vass
- Production company: Sokal-Film
- Distributed by: UFA
- Release date: 12 March 1926
- Country: Germany
- Languages: Silent; German intertitles

Die Zwei und die Dame is a 1926 German silent comedy crime film directed by Alwin Neuß and starring Agnes Esterhazy, Bernhard Goetzke and Henry Stuart. It was based on a novel by Sven Elvestad. It premiered in Berlin on 12 March 1926.

== Cast ==
- Agnes Esterhazy as Sonja
- Bernhard Goetzke as Lawyer Aage Gade
- Henry Stuart as Polizeileutnant Helmersen
- Karl Platen as Polizeirat Krag
- Albert von Kersten as Apache
- Gyula Szőreghy as Komplize
- Elly Leffler
- Robert Leffler

== Bibliography ==
- Grange, William. Cultural Chronicle of the Weimar Republic. Scarecrow Press, 2008.
