= Adolf E. Licho =

Russian-German actor and filmmaker

- Born: Adolf Edgar Lichowetzer; 13 September 1876; Kremenchug, Poltava Governorate, Russian Empire, now Ukraine
- Died: 11 October 1944 (aged 68); Los Angeles, California, United States
- Occupations: Actor, screenwriter, director
- Years active: 1914–1944 (film)

Adolf Edgar Licho (born Adolf Edgar Lichowetzer; 13 September 1876 – 11 October 1944) was a Russian-German actor, screenwriter, and film director. He was born of Jewish parentage in Kremenchug which was then part of the Russian Empire, but emigrated to Germany to work in the theatre and then later in silent films. Following the Nazi Party's takeover in 1933 he went into exile, first in Austria and France and later in the United States. In Hollywood he played minor roles until his death in 1944.

== Selected filmography ==
- Schuldig (1913)
- The Seeds of Life (1918) – Treugold, Literat
- Doktor Palmore. Der schleichende Tod (1918) – Doktor Palmore
- The Yellow Ticket (1918, Short) – Professor Stanlaus
- The Foreign Prince (1918) – Der Varietedirektor
- Der Todesschacht (1920)
- The Red Poster (1920) – Emil Storch (Artist)
- Leben und Lüge (1920) – Margulin
- The White Peacock (1920) – Variétéwirt
- Whitechapel (1920) – Brillantenhändler van Zuider
- Madame Récamier (1920) – Robert
- Die sieben Todsünden (1920)
- From Morn to Midnight (1920) – Fatter Herr
- Der Erbe Der Van Diemen (1921) – Großkapitalist
- Off the Rails (1921)
- Fahrendes Volk (1921)
- Roswolsky's Mistress (1921) – Theaterdirektor
- Das rote Plakat, 2. Teil – Die eiserne Acht (1921) – Emil Storch
- Wandering Souls (1921) – Herr Lebedoff
- Anna Maria (1921)
- The Fateful Day (1921, Director)
- The Golden Net (1922)
- Women's Sacrifice (1922) – Alter Boheme
- Kinder der Zeit (1922)
- The Count of Charolais (1922) – Wucherer
- Lucrezia Borgia (1922) – Lodowico
- The Game with Women (1922, Director)
- Kaddish (1924)
- Comedians (1925) – Charkterspieler
- The Humble Man and the Chanteuse (1925)
- The City of Temptation (1925)
- The Adventures of Sybil Brent (1925) – Pötter, Direktor des Theatrs
- The Adventure of Mr. Philip Collins (1926) – President Cuffler, Daisys Vater
- His Late Excellency (1927)
- The Love of Jeanne Ney (1927) – Raymond Ney
- Luther (1928) – (uncredited)
- Charlotte Somewhat Crazy (1928, Director)
- Scandal in Baden-Baden (1929) – Agent
- My Daughter's Tutor (1930) – Rabbiner
- Alraune (1930) – Attorney-at-law Manasse
- 1914 (1931) – Suchomlinow
- Grock (1931) – 1. Nichtkäufer
- Men Behind Bars (1931) – Annies Vater
- The Eaglet (1931, Writer)
- The Duke of Reichstadt (1931, Writer)
- Victoria and Her Hussar (1931) – Birinski
- Peace of Mind (1931) – Lotte Fiedlers Vater
- The Testament of Dr. Mabuse (1933) – Dr. Hauser
- The Big Bluff (1933) – Paradieser
- Ende schlecht, alles gut (1934) – Businessman
- Bretter, die die Welt bedeuten (1935) – Traeger, Theateragent
- The Affairs of Maupassant (1935) – Excellenz
- Il diario di una donna amata (1935)
- Catherine the Last (1936) – Exzellenz
- Shipwrecked Max (1936) – Köhler
- Chéri-Bibi (1938) – Boris
- The Shanghai Drama (1938) – Le faussaire (uncredited)
- Gibraltar (1938) – (uncredited)
- Three Waltzes (1938) – Le producteur
- Man Hunt (1941) – Little Fat Man (uncredited)
- It Started with Eve (1941) – Sigoni (uncredited)
- To Be or Not to Be (1942) – Prompter (uncredited)
- Between Us Girls (1942) – Ambassador (uncredited)
- Once Upon a Honeymoon (1942) – French Waiter (uncredited)
- Reunion in France (1942) – Hawker (uncredited)
- Mission to Moscow (1943) – Bookseller (uncredited)
- Above Suspicion (1943) – Museum Guide (uncredited)
- Hitler's Madman (1943) – Doctor (uncredited)
- Phantom Lady (1944) – Max – Proprietor (uncredited)
- The White Cliffs of Dover (1944) – Frenchman at Dieppe Train Station (uncredited)
- Days of Glory (1944) – Anton (uncredited)
- The Mask of Dimitrios (1944) – Bulgarian Cafe Proprietor (uncredited)
- The Seventh Cross (1944) – S.A. Guard (uncredited) (final film role)
