= Fritzi Massary =

Austria-American singer (1882–1969)

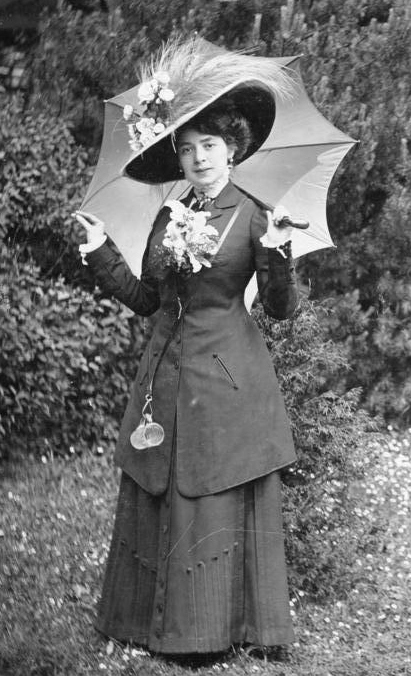
Massary in 1909

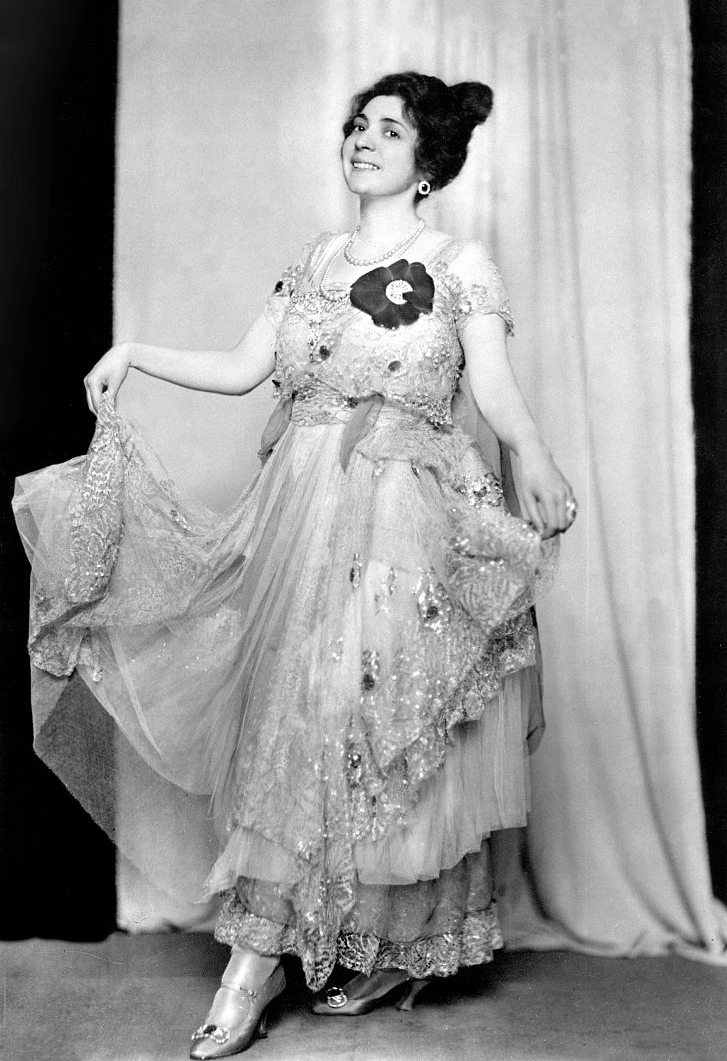
Massary in 1916

Fritzi Massary (31 March 1882 – 30 January 1969) was an Austrian-American soprano singer and actress.

== Early life and career ==
Fritzi Massary was born Friederike Massaryk in Vienna in the Austro-Hungarian Empire on 31 March 1882. She was one of the leading operetta singers in Berlin and Vienna.

During World War I, she performed for the soldiers of the Imperial German Army in theatres in occupied Belgium.

In 1920, she worked with the composer Oscar Straus, and performed in several of his operettas, including Der letzte Walzer.

== Emigration to England and America ==
Massary was of Jewish familial extraction, and she had converted to the Protestant religion in 1903. In late 1932, she departed Germany due to the rising persecution of the Jewish population by the Nazis, shortly before the group seized dictatorial power in a paramilitary revolution and declared the Third Reich. Traveling through Austria and Switzerland, she went to London, where she was befriended by Noël Coward and starred in his theatrical musical Operette in 1938.

In February 1939, shortly before the outbreak of World War II engulfed Europe, she moved to Beverly Hills, California.

== Later life ==
Beginning in 1952, she regularly spent summers in Germany. She had been suggested by Cecil Beaton for the role of the Queen of Transylvaniia in the 1964 musical film My Fair Lady, but she demanded too much pay, and the part went to Bina Rothschild.

She continued to reside in Beverly Hills until her death in Los Angeles on 30 January 1969.

== Personal life ==
Massary was married twice, first to an eye doctor Bernhard Pollack. With Karl-Kuno Rollo Graf von Coudenhove (1887–1940), she had her only child, Elisabeth Maria Karl (called Liesl) (1903–1979). Liesl later married the author Bruno Frank. Although Coudenhove was Liesl's father, Massary never was married to him. Massary's second marriage in 1917 was to the Austrian actor Max Pallenberg (1877–1934), who died in a plane crash in Karlsbad in 1934.

== Selected filmography ==
- The Tunnel (1915)
- The Rose of Stamboul (1919)
