= The Wig (1925 film) =

1925 film

- Directed by: Berthold Viertel
- Written by: Berthold Viertel
- Produced by: Eberhard Frowein
- Starring: Otto Gebühr; Jenny Hasselqvist; Henry Stuart
- Cinematography: Helmar Lerski
- Production company: Westi Film
- Distributed by: Dewesti-Verleih
- Release date: 23 January 1925
- Country: Germany
- Languages: Silent; German intertitles

The Wig (German: Die Perücke) is a 1925 German silent comedy film directed by Berthold Viertel and starring Otto Gebühr, Jenny Hasselqvist and Henry Stuart.

The film's sets were designed by the art director Walter Reimann.

== Cast ==
- Otto Gebühr as Querulin und Fürst
- Jenny Hasselqvist as Fürstin
- Henry Stuart as Julian
- Karl Platen as Der alte Diener
- Fred Goebel as Der junge Dichter
- Jaro Fürth as Nervenarzt
- Lilian Jaernefelt as Zofe

== Bibliography ==
- Grange, William. Cultural Chronicle of the Weimar Republic. Scarecrow Press, 2008.
