= The Game with Women =

1922 film

- Directed by: Adolf E. Licho
- Written by: Bruno Lange
- Produced by: Paul Davidson
- Starring: Hanni Weisse; Georg Alexander; Lotte Neumann
- Cinematography: Carl Drews
- Production company: PAGU
- Distributed by: UFA
- Release date: 30 March 1922
- Country: Germany
- Languages: Silent; German intertitles

The Game with Women (German: Das Spiel mit dem Weibe) is a 1922 German silent drama film directed by Adolf E. Licho and starring Hanni Weisse, Georg Alexander, and Lotte Neumann.

The film's sets were designed by the art director Robert Neppach.

== Cast ==
- Hanni Weisse as Lisa, Baronessa von Reichenbach
- Georg Alexander as Freiherr Karl von Settenburg
- Lotte Neumann as Hanna
- Rose Veldtkirch as Irma Kluge
- Hans Sturm as Kutscher
- Hans Brausewetter
- Josefine Dora
- Else Ferdinand
- Erwin Fichtner
- Ernst Gronau
- Emil Heyse
- Walter Redlich
- Hedy Searle
- Ruth Singer

== Bibliography ==
- Grange, William (2008). Cultural Chronicle of the Weimar Republic. Lanham, MD: Scarecrow Press. ISBN 978-0-8108-5967-8.
