= The Beggar from Cologne Cathedral =

1927 film

- Directed by: Rolf Randolf
- Written by: Emanuel Alfieri (play)
- Produced by: Rudolf Meinert
- Starring: Henry Stuart; Elza Temary; Carl de Vogt
- Cinematography: Willy Hameister
- Music by: Hans May
- Production company: Internationale Film
- Distributed by: Internationale Film
- Release date: 27 August 1927
- Running time: 101 minutes
- Country: Germany
- Languages: Silent; German intertitles

The Beggar from Cologne Cathedral (German: Der Bettler vom Kölner Dom) is a 1927 German silent crime film directed by Rolf Randolf and starring Henry Stuart, Elza Temary and Carl de Vogt. A detective on the trail of a gang of criminals traces them to Cologne.

The film's art direction was by Gustav A. Knauer.

== Cast ==
- Henry Stuart as Tom Wilkens
- Elza Temary as Mabel Strong
- Carl de Vogt as Der Bettler vom Kölner Dom
- Hanni Weisse as Madame Madeleine Tréville
- Robert Scholz as Marquis de Puissac
- Fritz Kampers as Steffens, Chauffeur
- Harry Lamberts-Paulsen as Emil
- Carl Geppert as Napoleon Bonaparte Schmitz, Privatdetektiv
- Hermann Blaß as Carolus Caesar Müller, Privatdetektiv
- Rudolf Hilberg as Der Hoteldirektor
- Eugen Jensen as Der Kommissar
- Hugo Flink as Der Versicherungsagent
- Rudolf Meinhard-Jünger as Tünnes

== Bibliography ==
- Stach, Babett; Morsbach, Helmut (1992). German Film Posters: 1895–1945. Munich: K.G. Saur. ISBN 978-3-598-22593-2.
