= The Humble Man and the Chanteuse =

1925 film directed by E. A. Dupont

- German: Der Demütige und die Tänzerin
- Directed by: Ewald André Dupont
- Written by: Felix Hollaender (novel); Max Glass; Ewald André Dupont
- Starring: Lil Dagover; Olga Limburg; Margarete Kupfer; Hans Mierendorff
- Cinematography: Werner Brandes
- Production company: Terra Film
- Distributed by: Terra Film
- Release date: 2 April 1925
- Country: Germany
- Languages: Silent; German intertitles

The Humble Man and the Chanteuse (German: Der Demütige und die Tänzerin) is a 1925 German silent film directed by E. A. Dupont and starring Lil Dagover, Olga Limburg and Margarete Kupfer. It was based on a novel by Felix Hollaender.

The film's art direction was by Oscar Friedrich Werndorff.

== Cast ==
- Lil Dagover as Toni Seidewitz
- Olga Limburg as Trude Wessely
- Margarete Kupfer as Frau von Bülow
- Hans Mierendorff as manufacturer Liesegang
- Georg Baselt
- Paul Bildt as Liesegang's servant
- Gertrud de Lalsky as Professor Müller-Osten
- Karl Elzer
- Robert Garrison
- Harry Halm as Prinz
- Martin Kettner as theater agent
- Arnold Korff as intendant
- Eberhard Leithoff as The Humble / Bandleader
- Adolf E. Licho
- Harald Paulsen
- Louis Ralph as Raimondi, doctor
- Hans Sternberg as variety director Pullmann
