= Roswolsky's Mistress =

1921 film

- German: Die Geliebte Roswolskys
- Directed by: Felix Basch
- Written by: Henrik Galeen; Hans Janowitz
- Based on: Roswolsky's Mistress by George Froeschel
- Starring: Asta Nielsen; Paul Wegener; Wilhelm Diegelmann; Ferdinand von Alten
- Cinematography: Carl Drews; Adolf Lieberenz
- Music by: Bruno Schulz
- Production company: Messter Film
- Distributed by: UFA
- Release date: 2 September 1921
- Country: Germany
- Languages: Silent; German intertitles

Roswolsky's Mistress (German: Die Geliebte Roswolskys) is a 1921 German silent drama film directed by Felix Basch and starring Asta Nielsen, Paul Wegener, and Wilhelm Diegelmann. It was based on a novel by George Froeschel. The film was shot at the Tempelhof Studios in Berlin, with sets designed by art directors Robert Neppach and Jack Winter. According to one estimate, the star Asta Nielsen wore thirty six different costumes during the course of the film.

== Plot ==
A working class girl is mistakenly believed to have become the mistress of a billionaire. The mistaken belief attracts fame and fortune for her.

== Cast ==
- Asta Nielsen as Mary Verhag
- Paul Wegener as Eugen Roswolsky
- Wilhelm Diegelmann as secretary
- Ferdinand von Alten as Lico Mussafin
- Marga von Kierska as Fernande Raway
- Guido Herzfeld as Flügelmann, moneylender
- Arnold Korff as coroner
- Carl Bayer as jeweller
- Adolphe Engers as Jean Meyer
- Ernst Gronau as Layton
- Max Landa as Baron Albich
- Adolf E. Licho as theater director
- Maria Peterson as room landlord
- Emil Rameau as bandmaster
- Gertrud Wolle as Martha Verhag, Sister von Mary

== Bibliography ==
- Jung, Uli; Schatzberg, Walter (1999). Beyond Caligari: The Films of Robert Wiene. New York: Berghahn Books. ISBN 978-1-57181-156-1.
