= Superfluous People =

1926 film

- Directed by: Aleksandr Razumny
- Written by: Anton Chekhov; Aleksandr Razumny
- Produced by: Willi Münzenberg
- Starring: Eugen Klöpfer; Camilla von Hollay; Heinrich George
- Cinematography: Karl Attenberger; Otto Kanturek
- Music by: Edmund Meisel
- Production company: Prometheus-Film
- Distributed by: Prometheus-Film
- Release date: 2 November 1926
- Country: Germany
- Languages: Silent; German intertitles

Superfluous People (German:Überflüssige Menschen) is a 1926 German silent film directed by Aleksandr Razumny and starring Eugen Klöpfer, Camilla von Hollay and Heinrich George. It was made by Prometheus-Film which was affiliated to the German Communist Party and the Moscow-based Mezhrabpomfilm.

The film's sets were designed by the art directors Andrej Andrejew and Stefan Lhotka.

== Cast ==
- Eugen Klöpfer as Andrej Karlowitsch Siganew
- Camilla von Hollay as Dunja Siganewa
- Heinrich George as Balagula
- Albert Steinrück as Bronsa
- Vera Pawlowa as Marfa
- Bruno Arno as Mendel Rothschild
- Fritz Rasp as Chirikov
- Emil Lind as Schachkes
- Werner Krauss as Ortspolizist Suka
- Philipp Manning as Bürgermeister Duboff
- Hedwig Wangel as Duboffs Frau
- Elza Temary as Ola, beider Tochter
- Illo Gutschwager as Wanja, beider Sohn
- Hans Brausewetter as Lukin
- Wilhelm Diegelmann as Brandmeister
- Fritz Kampers as Ben Span
- Jaro Fürth as Arzt
- Nikolai Malikoff as Bader
- Vera Sacharowa as Verlobungsgast
- Harry Nestor
- Clementine Plessner
- Sylvia Torf

== Bibliography ==
- Murray, Bruce Arthur. Film and the German Left in the Weimar Republic: From Caligari to Kuhle Wampe. University of Texas Press, 1990.
