= Bernhard Pollack =

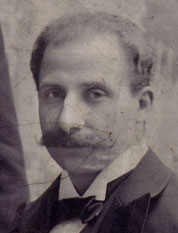
Bernhard Pollack (circa 1900)

Bernhard Pollack (14 August 1865 – 3 March 1928 in Berlin) was a German neuroanatomist and ophthalmologist practicing in Berlin. He held the post of Professor of Ophthalmology at the Friedrich Wilhelm University in Berlin. In addition to medical practice, he was a student of Moritz Moszkowski and a renowned pianist, having performed with Fritz Kreisler and with the violinist Joseph Szigeti.

His father Jakob Pollack was a merchant in Berlin, and his mother Ledermann came from Silesia. The family was Jewish. His sister Clara (1857–1896) was the mother of Richard Lichtheim. He was first married to the actress and soprano Fritzi Massary (1882–1969), nonetheless their marriage was brief. In 1912, he married the Baroness Marie Elisabeth von Podhrágy Popper (1887–1922).
