= Ernst Gronau =

German actor (1887–1938)

- Born: 21 August 1887; Memel, East Prussia, German Empire
- Died: 10 August 1938 (aged 50); Hörnum, German Reich
- Occupation: Actor
- Years active: 1917–1937

Ernst Gronau (21 August 1887 – 10 August 1938) was a German actor and writer.

== Selected filmography ==
- Prostitution (1919)
- Genuine (1920)
- Roswolsky's Mistress (1921)
- The Graveyard of the Living (1921)
- Miss Julie (1922)
- The Stream (1922)
- The Curse of Silence (1922)
- The Game with Women (1922)
- Man by the Wayside (1923)
- And Yet Luck Came (1923)
- Liebesbriefe der Baronin von S... (1924)
- Wood Love (1925)
- His Late Excellency (1927)
- Prinz Louis Ferdinand (1927)
- Father and Son (1930)
- I for You, You for Me (1934)

== Bibliography ==
- Jung, Uli & Schatzberg, Walter. Beyond Caligari: The Films of Robert Wiene. Berghahn Books, 1999.
