= The Girl Without a Homeland =

1927 film

- Directed by: Constantin J. David
- Written by: Constantin J. David; Alfred Schirokauer
- Starring: Jenny Hasselqvist; Henry Stuart; Oskar Homolka
- Cinematography: Georg Muschner
- Production company: Domo-Strauß-Film
- Distributed by: Strauss-Film
- Release date: 1927
- Countries: Austria; Germany
- Languages: Silent; German intertitles

The Girl Without a Homeland (German: Das Mädchen ohne Heimat) is a 1927 Austrian-German silent drama film directed by Constantin J. David and starring Jenny Hasselqvist, Henry Stuart, and Oskar Homolka.

The film's sets were designed by the art director Karl Görge.

== Cast ==
- Jenny Hasselquist as Eve Bennet
- Henry Stuart as Georg Raval
- Oscar Homolka as Plempe
- Robert Valberg as Kriminalkommissar Brun
- Irene Krauß as Frau Raval
- Max Freiburg as Consul Cornelius
- Gertrud Kallina as Frau Cornelius
- Hans Lackner as Robert Porrier
- Helen von Münchofen as Carola de Rizo
- Emmy Flemmich as Madame Titine
- Margit Piller as Minna Müller, Kid
- Harry Frank as Gustav Bernard
- Viktor Franz as Quetscher
- Leopold Iwald as Hotelportier
- Magda Karmen as Kellnerin
- Sophie Pagay as Krähe, eine Frau aus dem Nachtasyl

== Bibliography ==
- Bock, Hans-Michael; Bergfelder, Tim, eds. (2009). The Concise Cinegraph: Encyclopaedia of German Cinema. New York: Berghahn Books. ISBN 978-1-57181-655-9.
