= Miss Julie (1922 film) =

1922 film

- German release poster
- Directed by: Felix Basch
- Written by: Max Jungk; Julius Urgiß
- Based on: Miss Julie by August Strindberg
- Produced by: Asta Nielsen
- Starring: Asta Nielsen; William Dieterle; Lina Lossen
- Cinematography: Julius Balting
- Production company: Artfilm
- Distributed by: National Film
- Release date: 2 February 1922
- Running time: 1,589 metres (5,213 ft)
- Country: Germany
- Languages: Silent; German intertitles

Miss Julie (German: Fräulein Julie) is a 1922 German silent drama film directed by Felix Basch and starring Asta Nielsen, William Dieterle, and Lina Lossen. It was based loosely on August Strindberg's 1888 play Miss Julie.

== Plot ==
Julie, a young noble woman, is drawn to a senior servant, a valet named Jean, who is particularly well-traveled, well-mannered and well-read.

== Cast ==
- Asta Nielsen as Julie
- William Dieterle as Jean, Waiter
- Lina Lossen as The Countess
- Arnold Korff as The Count
- Käthe Dorsch as Christine, Kitchen Maid
- Olaf Storm as The Bridegroom
- Georg H. Schnell as The Friend
- Ernst Gronau

== Production and release ==
Miss Julie passed the film censorship on 24 November 1921 and premiered on 2 February 1922 at the Marmorhaus. The five-act play was 1589 meters long.

The film's sets were designed by the art directors Robert Herlth and Walter Röhrig.
