= Patience (film) =

1920 film

- German: Die Karten des Todes
- Directed by: Felix Basch Paul Leni
- Written by: Ewald André Dupont
- Produced by: Hanns Lippmann
- Starring: Conrad Veidt; Adele Sandrock; Wilhelm Diegelmann
- Cinematography: Carl Hoffmann
- Production company: Gloria-Film
- Release date: 16 April 1920
- Country: Germany
- Languages: Silent; German intertitles

Patience or The Cards of Death (German: Die Karten des Todes) is a 1920 German silent film directed by Felix Basch and Paul Leni and starring Conrad Veidt, Adele Sandrock, and Wilhelm Diegelmann. It was produced by Gloria-Film, a company later taken over by UFA.

The film's sets were designed by Paul Leni.

== Cast ==
- Conrad Veidt as Sir Percy Parker
- Felix Basch as Edward
- Adele Sandrock as Ahne
- Irmgard Bern as Jane
- Wilhelm Diegelmann as Fischer Tom
- Karl Platen as Pfarrer
- Aenderly Lebius
- Loni Nest
- Marga von Kierska
- Max Winter
