= Felix Basch =

Austrian actor

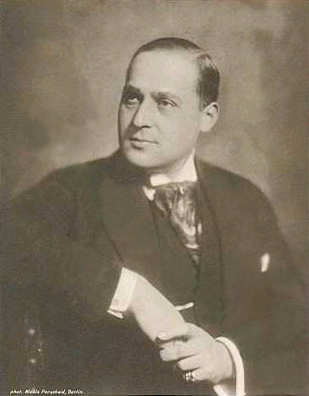
- Born: 16 September 1885; Vienna, Austro-Hungarian Empire
- Died: 17 May 1944 (aged 58); Los Angeles, California, U.S.
- Occupations: Film actor, screenwriter, film director
- Years active: 1914–1944
- Spouse: Gretl Basch

Felix Basch (1885–1944) was an American-Austrian actor, screenwriter and film director.

He first acted in Vienna, and he was a producer and director for the German film production company U. F. A. Following the Nazi takeover of power in Germany in 1933, the Jewish Basch was forced out of films and went into exile, moving to the United States where he appeared in a large number of films acting in character roles. He was married to the actress and singer Grete Freund and was the father of Peter Basch. According to U.S. immigration entry records, he gained his American citizenship through his father.

Basch died May 18, 1944, at Cedars of Lebanon Hospital in Hollywood, California, after several major operations.

== Selected filmography ==
=== Actor ===
- My Leopold (1914)
- Die Ehe auf Kündigung (1914)
- Der Schuß um Mitternacht (1914)
- Ein Skandal in der Gesellschaft (1914)
- Ein Kindesherz (1914)
- Nelly (1914)
- Nelly - 2. Teil (1914)
- Selbstgerichtet oder Die Gelbe Fratze (1914)
- Heimgekehrt (1914)
- Das Paradies der Frauen (1914)
- The Iron Cross (1914)
- Laugh Bajazzo (1915)
- Kehre zurück! Alles vergeben! (1915) - Detektiv Wichtig
- The Tunnel (1915)
- Der Herr Baron (1915)
- Die letzte Partie (1915)
- Der Onkel aus Amerika (1915)
- Der falsche Schein (1915)
- Talarso (1916)
- Im schwarzen Rössl (1916)
- Fantasie des Aristide Caré (1918)
- The Rose of Stamboul (1919) - Achmed Bei / André Lery
- Die silberne Fessel (1920) - Professor Roden / Prinz von Indien
- Patience (1920) - Edward
- Menschen von heute (1920) - Pseudograf
- The Woman in Doctor's Garb (1920) - Dr. George Hill
- Mascotte (1920)
- Die Liebe der Sklavin (1920)
- Hannerl and Her Lovers (1921) - Jan Robulja
- Die Bettlerprinzessin (1921) - Hamilton
- Eines großen Mannes Liebe (1921) - Herzog Ernst
- The Curse of Silence (1922)
- The Stream (1922)
- Jugendsünden (1923)
- Pacific Rendezvous (1942) - de Segroff
- Enemy Agents Meet Ellery Queen (1942) - Helm - Lido Club Manager
- Desperate Journey (1942) - Hermann Brahms
- Destination Unknown (1942) - Karl Renner
- Once Upon a Honeymoon (1942) - Herr Kelman (uncredited)
- Hitler – Dead or Alive (1942) - Col. Hecht
- Reunion in France (1942) - Pawnbroker (uncredited)
- Chetniks (1943) - General von Bauer
- Hangmen Also Die! (1943) - (uncredited)
- Mission to Moscow (1943) - Dr. Hjalmar Schacht - Banker (uncredited)
- The Boy from Stalingrad (1943) - German Colonel (uncredited)
- Above Suspicion (1943) - Guide (uncredited)
- Appointment in Berlin (1943) - Hoppner (uncredited)
- The Falcon in Danger (1943) - Morley
- Bomber's Moon (1943) - Dr. Hartman - Oflag Medical Officer (uncredited)
- Hostages (1943) - Dr. Wallerstein
- The Cross of Lorraine (1943) - German Captain (uncredited)
- Women in Bondage (1943) - Dr. Mensch
- The Desert Song (1943) - Heinzelman (uncredited)
- None Shall Escape (1944) - Nazi Official (uncredited)
- Uncertain Glory (1944) - Gestapo Major (uncredited)
- The Hitler Gang (1944) - Alfred Hugenberg (uncredited)
- The Mask of Dimitrios (1944) - Vazoff (uncredited)
- Wilson (1944) - Minor Role (uncredited) (final film role)

=== Director ===
- The Rose of Stamboul (1919)
- Patience (1920)
- Mascotte (1920)
- Roswolsky's Mistress (1921)
- Hannerl and Her Lovers (1921)
- Miss Julie (1922)
- The Stream (1922)
- The Curse of Silence (1922)
- Destiny (1925)
- Love's Finale (1925)
- Darling, Count the Cash (1926)
- Her Husband's Wife (German: Der Mann seiner Frau)(1926); starring Nils Asther, Lucy Doraine, Erich Kaiser-Titz and Rudolf Klein-Rogge
- The Girl on a Swing (1926)
- The Son of Hannibal (1926)
- A Serious Case (1927)
- One Plus One Equals Three (1927)
- Mascottchen (1929)
- Zwei Krawatten (1930)
- Seine Freundin Annette (1931)

== Bibliography ==
- Murray, Bruce Arthur (1990). Film and the German Left in the Weimar Republic: From Caligari to Kuhle Wampe. Austin: University of Texas Press. ISBN 978-0-292-72465-5.
- Prawer, Siegbert Salomon (2007) [2005]. Between Two Worlds: The Jewish Presence in German and Austrian Film, 1910–1933. New York: Berghahn Books. ISBN 978-1-84545-303-9.
