= His Late Excellency (1927 film) =

1927 film

- Swedish poster
- Directed by: Adolf E. Licho; Wilhelm Thiele
- Written by: Rudolf Presber; L.W. Stein; Adolf E. Licho; Wilhelm Thiele
- Starring: Willy Fritsch; Olga Chekhova; Ernst Gronau
- Cinematography: Werner Brandes
- Production company: UFA
- Distributed by: Parufamet
- Release date: 16 September 1927
- Running time: 100 minutes
- Country: Germany
- Languages: Silent; German intertitles

His Late Excellency (German: Die selige Exzellenz) is a 1927 German silent comedy film directed by Adolf E. Licho and Wilhelm Thiele and starring Willy Fritsch, Olga Chekhova, and Ernst Gronau. It was shot at the Tempelhof Studios in Berlin. The film's sets were designed by the art directors Erich Czerwonski and Günther Hentschel.

== Synopsis ==
When a veteran aristocrat dies there is deep concern about the reported scandalous content of his memoirs, detailing the misdeeds of many of the country's leading citizens. They have come into the possession of Baroness von Windegg who enlists the help of the young Prince Ernst Albrecht to prevent a series of attempted thefts.

== Cast ==
- Willy Fritsch as Fürst Ernst Albrecht
- Olga Chekhova as Baronin von Windegg
- Ernst Gronau as Alte Exzellenz
- Max Gülstorff as Max Buxbaum
- Lydia Potechina as Mathilde Buxbaum
- Truus Van Aalten as Elsa Bucbaum, die Tochter
- Hans Junkermann as Baron von Gillingen
- Max Hansen as Sekretär Conrad Weber
- Julius Falkenstein as Apotheker Paschke
- Fritz Kampers
- Adolf E. Licho
- Albert Paulig

== Bibliography ==
- Bock, Hans-Michael; Bergfelder, Tim, eds. (2009). The Concise Cinegraph: Encyclopaedia of German Cinema. New York: Berghahn Books. ISBN 978-1-57181-655-9.
- Bock, Hans-Michael & Töteberg, Michael . Das Ufa-Buch. Zweitausendeins, 1992.
