= Ágnes Esterházy =

Hungarian actress (1891–1956)

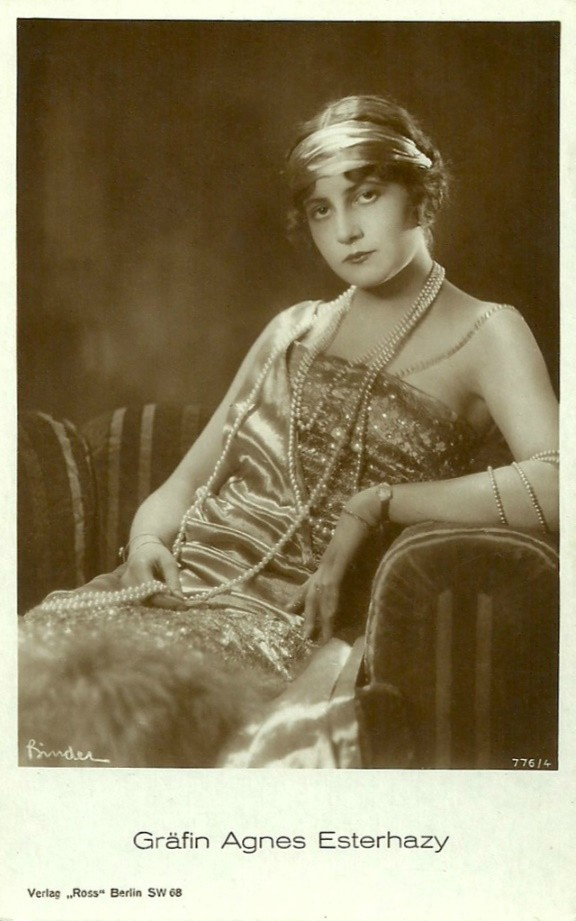
- Born: Ágnes Jósika de Branyitska; 15 January 1891; Kolozsvár, Austria-Hungary (present-day Cluj-Napoca, Romania)
- Died: 4 April 1956 (aged 65); Munich, West Germany
- Other names: Gräfin Agnes Esterhazy; Agnes von Esterhazy
- Occupation: Actress
- Years active: 1918–1943
- Spouse: Freiherr Conrad von Eybesfeld marriage 1923/ Divorced 1924 marriage Fritz Schulz (actor)

Ágnes Esterházy (born Ágnes Jósika de Branyitska, 15 January 1891 – 4 April 1956) was a Hungarian film actress who worked mainly in Austria and Germany. She appeared in 32 films between 1918 and 1943.

== Biography ==
Ágnes Esterházy was born on 15 January 1891, the daughter of Count Jósika von Branyitska and Countess Ágnes Esterházy.

She moved to Budapest, where Esterházy took acting lessons from Ilka Pálmay and worked for Városi Színház, the local theater. Esterházy made her film debut in Palika (1918), followed by Lila test, sárga sapka (1918), and A szerelem mindent legyöz (1921).In 1923, after receiving an offer from Sascha-Film, she left to Vienna, where she starred in Young Medardus (1923). She married Freiherrn Heinz Conrad von Eybesfeld in 1923 and divorced in 1924. She was married to the actor Fritz Schulz In Berlin, she acted in Nanon (1924) with Harry Liedtke and Hanni Weisse, and Two People (1924) opposite Olaf Fjord.

Esterházy appeared in silent classics such as Joyless Street (1925), starring Asta Nielsen and a pre-Hollywood fame Greta Garbo, and The Student of Prague (1926), starring Conrad Veidt.

Although Esterházy was known for playing supporting roles throughout her career, she did play as the lead in films such as The Beggar Student (1927) and Chance the Idol (1927), both with Harry Liedtke.

Under the direction of Karl Grune, she acted in the historical drama Spy of Madame Pompadour (1928) with Liane Haid.

The arrival of sound film ended Esterházy's career. Her final film appearance was in Gabriele Dambrone (1943), which credited her as Agnes von Esterhazy.

Shortly after the Anschluss, Esterházy's husband, actor Fritz Schulz was arrested for "racial reasons" and presumably detained in the Rossauer Lände police prison in Vienna. It was only through Esterházy's efforts that Schulz was released in late May or early June 1938.

Ágnes Esterházy died on 4 April 1956 at the age of 65.

== Selected filmography ==
- Young Medardus (1923)
- Nanon (1924)
- Two People (1924)
- The Voice of the Heart (1924)
- The Flight in the Night (1926)
- The Student of Prague (1926)
- The Wooing of Eve (1926)
- Wrath of the Seas (1926)
- Two and a Lady (1926)
- The Beggar Student (1927)
- Chance the Idol (1927)
- The Transformation of Dr. Bessel (1927)
- Spy of Madame Pompadour (1928)
- His Majesty's Lieutenant (1929)
- Father Radetzky (1929)
- The Man Without Love (1929)
- Love and Champagne (1930)
- Gabriele Dambrone (1943)
