= The Rose of Stamboul (1953 film) =

1953 film directed by Karl Anton

- German film poster
- German: Die Rose von Stambul
- Directed by: Karl Anton
- Written by: Joachim Wedekind; Alfred Grünwald; Walter Forster; Julius Brammer
- Based on: The Rose of Stamboul by Leo Fall
- Starring: Inge Egger; Albert Lieven; Grethe Weiser; Hans Richter
- Cinematography: Karl Löb; Fritz Arno Wagner
- Edited by: Martha Dübber
- Music by: Leo Fall
- Production company: Central-Europa Film
- Distributed by: Prisma
- Release date: 7 May 1953
- Running time: 108 minutes
- Country: West Germany
- Language: German

The Rose of Stamboul (German: Die Rose von Stambul) is a 1953 West German musical film directed by Karl Anton and starring Inge Egger, Albert Lieven and Grethe Weiser. It was shot at the Tempelhof Studios in West Berlin and on location in Istanbul. The film's sets were designed by the art director Erich Kettelhut. It is based on Leo Fall's 1916 operetta of the same name.

== Synopsis ==
A senior Ottoman official wishes his niece Kondja to return from Vienna to Constantinople and marry a promising young diplomat. She is very reluctant as she has fallen in love with a composer, who is in fact the same man.

== Cast ==
- Inge Egger as Kondja Gül
- Albert Lieven as Achmed Bey
- Grethe Weiser as Madame Desirée
- Hans Richter as Fridolin Müller
- Oskar Sima as Eduard Effendi
- Ingeborg Körner as Midilli Hanum
- Gunther Philipp as Marcel Lery
- Ethel Reschke as Madame Lery
- Otto Matthies as Fridolin Müller
- Kurt Vespermann as civil registrant
- Franz-Otto Krüger as head waiter
- Paul Hörbiger as Mehemed Pascha
- Laya Raki as dancer
- Ursula Ackermann as female singer
- Rasma Ducat as female singer
- Herbert Ernst Groh as male singer
- Kurt Reimann as male singer
- Gisela Deege as dancer
- Gert Reinholm as dancer
- Werner Stock
- Victor Janson

== See also ==
- The Rose of Stamboul (1919)
