= The Rose of Stamboul (1919 film) =

1919 film

- Scene from a film
- German: Die Rose von Stambul
- Directed by: Felix Basch; Arthur Wellin
- Written by: Julius Brammer; Alfred Grünwald
- Based on: The Rose of Stamboul by Leo Fall
- Produced by: Rudolf Dworsky
- Starring: Fritzi Massary; Gustav Botz; Ernst Pittschau
- Cinematography: Ernest Plhak
- Music by: Leo Fall; Felix Günther
- Production company: Amboß-Film Dworsky
- Release date: 12 September 1919
- Country: Germany
- Languages: Silent; German intertitles

The Rose of Stamboul (German: Die Rose von Stambul) is a 1919 German silent comedy film directed by Felix Basch and Arthur Wellin and starring Fritzi Massary, Gustav Botz, and Ernst Pittschau. It is based on the 1916 operetta The Rose of Stamboul.

The film's sets were designed by the art director Ernst Stern.

== Cast ==
- Fritzi Massary as Tochter von Pascha Kondja Gül
- Felix Basch as Achmed Bei / André Lery
- Gustav Botz as Minister Kemal Pascha
- Ernst Pittschau as Baron Rangen
- Franz Groß as dance master

== See also ==
- The Rose of Stamboul (1953 film)

== Bibliography ==
- Traubner, Richard (2003). Operetta: A Theatrical History. New York: Routledge. ISBN 978-0-415-96641-2.
