= Elza Temary =

German actress

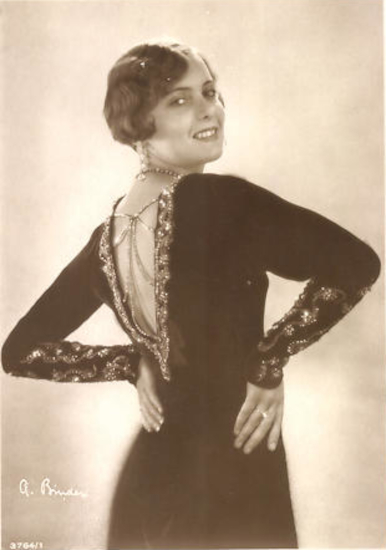
- by Alexander Binder, circa 1929
- Born: 12 February 1905; Austro-Hungarian Empire
- Died: 16 February 1968 (aged 63); Tucson, Arizona, United States
- Other names: Elza Chancellor, Elza K. Splane
- Occupation: Actress
- Years active: 1926–1932

Elza Temary [Elsa Temary] (12 February 1905 – 16 February 1968) was a Hungarian film actress.

== Personal life ==
Elza Temary was born Elza Klecker in Timișoara, Austria-Hungary.

After her active film career centered in Berlin, Germany which seems to have ended abruptly as Hitler took power, Elza married wildlife photographer / socialite Philip Chancellor and moved to Montecito, California, next to Santa Barbara. This is shown on the marriage notice at a London church. However, it was announced to the press that she was "Elza Tennair".

As Elza Chancellor, she was then occasionally in the press as a socialite and as Philip's wife. The Chancellors later moved to Los Angeles and in 1937 to Beverly Hills.

In 1937–38, Elza's husband, Philip was a witness in a trial as a British man, an alleged Nazi, was allegedly attempting to extort money from Philip, and use that money to allegedly fund the assassination of 24 prominent Hollywood Jews. The accused man was allowed to quickly leave the country and return to England.

After World War II, the Chancellors divorced and Elza later married a Mr. Splane and relocated to Tucson, Arizona.

== Selected filmography ==
- The Clever Fox (1926)
- Watch on the Rhine (1926)
- A Sister of Six (1926)
- Superfluous People (1926)
- Our Daily Bread (1926)
- The Mistress of the Governor (1927)
- The Girl with the Five Zeros (1927)
- The Beggar of Cologne Cathedral (1927)
- Chance the Idol (1927)
- The Case of Prosecutor M (1928)
- Adam and Eve (1928)
- Dangers of the Engagement Period (1930)
- Busy Girls (1930)
- Helene Willfüer, Student of Chemistry (1930)
- A Crafty Youth (1931)
- Rasputin, Demon with Women (1932)
- Under False Flag (1932)
- Chauffeur Antoinette (1932)
