= Hannerl and Her Lovers (1936 film) =

1936 film

- Directed by: Werner Hochbaum
- Written by: Rudolf Hans Bartsch (novel); Paul Knepler; Johann von Vásáry
- Starring: Olly von Flint; Albrecht Schoenhals; Hans Moser
- Cinematography: Károly Kurzmayer; Theodore J. Pahle
- Edited by: Else Baum
- Music by: Anton Profes; Bruno Uher
- Production company: Favorit Film
- Distributed by: Süddeutsche Commerz Film
- Release date: 10 November 1936
- Running time: 86 minutes
- Country: Austria
- Language: German

Hannerl and Her Lovers (German: Hannerl und ihre Liebhaber) is a 1936 Austrian comedy film directed by Werner Hochbaum and starring Olly von Flint, Albrecht Schoenhals and Hans Moser. It was based on a novel that had previously been adapted as a 1921 silent film of the same title.

It was made at the Rosenhügel Studios in Vienna. The film's sets were designed by Emil Stepanek and Julius von Borsody.

== Cast ==
- Olly von Flint as Hannerl
- Albrecht Schoenhals as Van den Born
- Hans Moser as Hafer, Hannerl's uncle
- Jane Tilden as Mizzi
- Rudolf Carl as Stiebitz
- Hans Holt as Vigilati
- Olga Chekhova as Frau von Stahl
- Anton Pointner as Robulja
- Ernst Pröckl as Wendtmeyer
- Anny Burg
- Karl Ehmann
- Richard Eybner
- Camilla Gerzhofer
- Mizzi Griebl
- Helene Lauterböck
- Fritz Müller
- Hanns Obonya
- Otto Storm

== Cast ==
- Love Me and the World Is Mine (1928)

== Bibliography ==
- Bock, Hans-Michael & Bergfelder, Tim. The Concise Cinegraph: Encyclopaedia of German Cinema. Berghahn Books, 2009.
