= Hannerl and Her Lovers (1921 film) =

1921 film

- German: Hannerl und ihre Liebhaber
- Directed by: Felix Basch
- Written by: Rudolf Hans Bartsch (novel); Max Jungk; Julius Urgiß
- Starring: Gretl Basch; Felix Basch
- Cinematography: Willy Gaebel
- Production company: Frankfurter Film
- Distributed by: UFA
- Release date: 4 February 1921
- Country: Germany
- Language: Silent German intertitles

Hannerl and Her Lovers (German: Hannerl und ihre Liebhaber) is a 1921 German silent comedy film directed by Felix Basch. It was remade as a 1936 Austrian sound film of the same title.

== Cast ==
- Gretl Basch as Hannerl Thule
- Felix Basch as Jan Robulja
- Ernst Deutsch as Priester
- Rosa Valetti as Wahrsagerin
- Arnold Korff as Von den Busch
- Karl Beckersachs
- Irmgard Bern
- Wilhelm Diegelmann
- Ilka Grüning
- Karl Platen
- Hermann Thimig
