= Exzellenz Unterrock =

1920 film

- Directed by: Edgar Klitsch
- Screenplay by: Adolf Paul
- Based on: Exzellenz Unterrock by Adolf Paul
- Starring: Marion Regler; Ellen Petz; Jürgen Fehling; Alexander Ekert
- Production company: Gong-Film GmbH
- Release date: 18 March 1921 (Berlin)
- Country: Germany

Exzellenz Unterrock (Her Excellency in Petticoats) is a 1920 German silent comedy film, based on the novel of the same title by Adolf Paul. Its cast included Marion Regler as the Chevalier d'Eon, Alexander Ekert as George II of Great Britain, Ellen Petz as Madame de Pompadour and Jürgen Fehling as Louis XV. It was one of a number of films produced in the Weimar Republic featuring women in "trouser roles".
