= Madness (1919 film) =

1919 film directed by Conrad Veidt

- Directed by: Conrad Veidt
- Written by: Hermann Fellner; Margarete Lindau-Schulz; Kurt Muenzer (novel)
- Produced by: Conrad Veidt
- Starring: Conrad Veidt; Reinhold Schünzel; Grit Hegesa; Gussy Holl
- Cinematography: Carl Hoffmann
- Production company: Veidtfilme
- Release date: 15 October 1919
- Country: Germany
- Languages: Silent; German intertitles

Madness (German: Wahnsinn) is a 1919 German silent horror film directed by Conrad Veidt and starring Veidt, Reinhold Schünzel and Grit Hegesa. The film's art direction was by Willi Herrmann.

After becoming a successful actor, Veidt formed his own production company called Veidtfilme and decided to try his hand at directing movies. Madness was one of two films directed by Veidt during his career, the other being the 1920 Die Nacht auf Goldenhall. Both films are lost today. The films had little impact at the box office. After 1920, Veidt returned exclusively to acting.

The screenplay of Madness was adapted from an obscure novel written by Kurt Muenzer.

== Plot ==
A wealthy banker (Veidt) is given a key to a lost trunk by a Gypsy, who tells him that the trunk's contents will lead him either to happiness or death. He becomes obsessed with finding the trunk, and his vain search leads him to a mental breakdown.

== Cast ==
- Conrad Veidt as Bankier Lorenzen
- Reinhold Schünzel as Jörges
- Grit Hegesa as Marion Cavello
- Gussy Holl as Mädchen aus dem Althändler Laden

== Bibliography ==
- Hutchings, Peter. The A to Z of Horror Cinema. Scarecrow Press, 2009.
