= The Merry-Go-Round (film) =

1920 film

- Directed by: Richard Oswald
- Written by: Richard Oswald
- Based on: Reigen; 1897 play by Arthur Schnitzler
- Produced by: Richard Oswald
- Starring: Asta Nielsen; Conrad Veidt; Eduard von Winterstein
- Cinematography: Axel Graatkjær; Carl Hoffmann
- Production companies: Decla-Bioscop; Richard-Oswald-Produktion; Wüst-Film
- Release date: 27 February 1920
- Country: Germany
- Languages: Silent; German intertitles

The Merry-Go-Round (German: Der Reigen) is a 1920 German silent film directed by Richard Oswald and starring Asta Nielsen, Conrad Veidt and Eduard von Winterstein. It was adapted from the 1897 play, La Ronde by Arthur Schnitzler.

The film's sets were designed by the art director Hans Dreier.

== Plot ==
The film tells the story of Elena, a woman with a dubious past, who marries a shop keeper, Albert. When her former pimp Peter shows up, her life is ruined. She shoots him and poisons herself.

== Cast ==
- Asta Nielsen as Elena
- Conrad Veidt as Peter Karvan
- Eduard von Winterstein as Albert Peters
- Irmgard Bern as Frau Peters
- Theodor Loos as Fritz Peters
- Loni Nest
- Willi Schaeffers
- Ilse von Tasso-Lind as Mutter
- Hugo Döblin
- Willy Karin

== Bibliography ==
- Grange, William (2008). Cultural Chronicle of the Weimar Republic. Scarecrow Press. ISBN 978-0810859678.
