= Erna Morena =

German actress

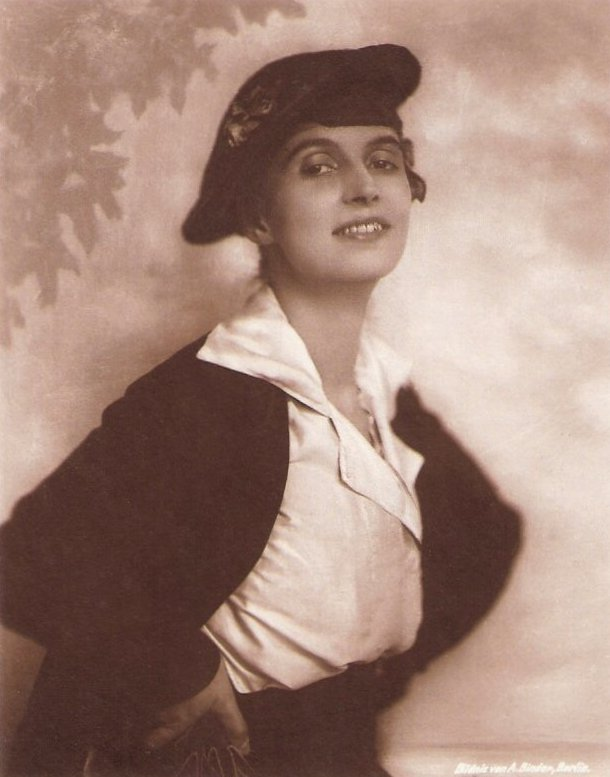
- Photo by Alexander Binder, c. 1925
- Born: Ernestine Maria Fuchs; 24 April 1885; Wörth am Main, German Empire
- Died: 20 July 1962 (aged 77); Munich, West Germany
- Occupations: Actress, producer, screenwriter
- Years active: 1910–1951
- Spouse: Wilhelm Herzog (m. 1915; div. 1921)
- Children: 1

Erna Morena (born Ernestine Maria Fuchs; 24 April 1885 – 20 July 1962) was a German film actress, film producer, and screenwriter of the silent era. She appeared in 104 films between 1913 and 1951.

== Biography ==
Ernestine Maria Fuchs was born into the middle-class family of Eugenie Fuchs (née. Seyler, 1862–1951) and Friedrich Fuchs (1859–1895) on 24 April 1885. She had a younger brother, Friedrich Fuchs (1890–1948), who became a Brentano researcher.

Fuchs went to Munich at age 17 to attend the school of applied arts. She later spent half a year in Paris before moving to Berlin in 1909, where she worked as a nurse.

She took lessons at the drama school of the German Theater in Berlin, and was hired by Max Reinhardt in 1910 as an actress. The following year she worked there in small roles, and began using the stage name Erna Morena.

She made her film debut in 1913 in The Sphinx by Eugen Illés for the newly founded film production company Literaria Film by Alfred Duskes. Her salary there was 500 marks per month, or about 2,016 euros.

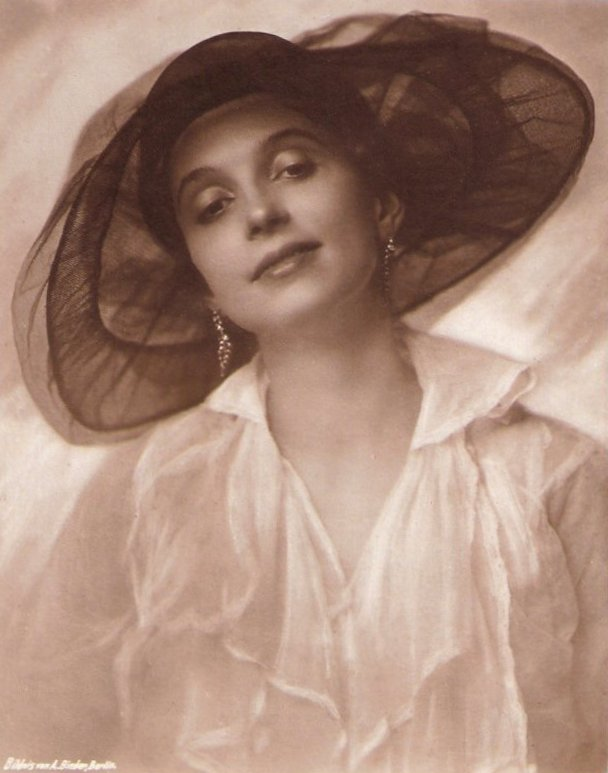
Erna Morena photographed by Alexander Binder, 1925

Morena worked under well-known directors such as Paul Leni, Richard Oswald, Robert Wiene, F. W. Murnau, and Georg Wilhelm Pabst, and acted alongside notable actors such as Conrad Veidt, Emil Jannings, Reinhold Schünzel, and Werner Krauss.

Morena also tried to be a producer: in 1918 she founded Erna Morena Film GmbH in Berlin, supported by a few friends as partners, with whom she produced the silent films Colomba (1918) and Die 999. Nacht (1920).

From 1915 to 1921 Erna Morena was married to the writer Wilhelm Herzog. The couple had one child, daughter Eva-Maria Herzog (1915–2007).

Morena played the role of the wife of the Konsistorialrat in the Nazi propaganda film Jud Süß. Her final film appearance was in Immortal Beloved (1951).

Morena died on 20 July 1962 and was buried next to her mother at the Winthirfriedhof in Munich-Neuhausen. Morena's daughter, Eva-Maria, was later buried with them upon her death in 2007.

== Selected filmography ==
- Frau Eva (1916)
- Lulu (1917)
- The Ring of Giuditta Foscari (1917)
- Colomba (1918)
- Diary of a Lost Woman (1918)
- The Skull of Pharaoh's Daughter (1920)
- Figures of the Night (1920)
- Algol (1920)
- Kurfürstendamm (1920)
- The Love Affairs of Hector Dalmore (1921)
- You Are the Life (1921)
- The Maharaja's Favourite Wife (1921)
- The Indian Tomb (1921)
- Journey Into the Night (1921)
- The Conspiracy in Genoa (1921)
- The Earl of Essex (1922)
- De bruut (1922)
- Louise de Lavallière (1922)
- Fridericus Rex (1922)
- Gold and Luck (1923)
- The Great Industrialist (1923)
- William Tell (1923)
- Mountain of Destiny (1924)
- Mother and Child (1924)
- Wallenstein (1925)
- Goetz von Berlichingen of the Iron Hand (1925)
- The Iron Bride (1925)
- In the Valleys of the Southern Rhine (1925)
- Bismarck (1925)
- An Artist of Life (1925)
- The Marriage Swindler (1925)
- One Does Not Play with Love (1926)
- The Adventurers (1926)
- The Grey House (1926)
- The Right to Live (1927)
- The Trial of Donald Westhof (1927)
- Bismarck 1862–1898 (1927)
- Grand Hotel (1927)
- Only a Viennese Woman Kisses Like That (1928)
- The Fate of the House of Habsburg (1928)
- Youthful Indiscretion (1929)
- Somnambul (1929)
- Misled Youth (1929)
- The Customs Judge (1929)
- The Love Market (1930)
- Scapa Flow (1930)
- The Song of the Nations (1931)
- Ash Wednesday (1931)
- The First Right of the Child (1932)
- A Night in Paradise (1932)
- The Eleven Schill Officers (1932)
- So Ended a Great Love (1934)
- Between Two Hearts (1934)
- Elisabeth and the Fool (1934)
- Song of Farewell (1934)
- What Am I Without You (1934)
- Farewell Waltz (1934)
- Pygmalion (1935)
- Victoria (1935)
- Between the Parents (1938)
- Jud Süß (1940)
- The Enchanted Princess (1940)
- Immortal Beloved (1951)
