= Das Geheimnis einer Nacht =

1915 film by Franz Hofer

Das Geheimnis einer Nacht (English: The Secret of a Night) is a 1915 German silent drama film by Franz Hofer.

== Plot ==
Carlton, a respected banker, is in the middle of a business meeting at night, when receives an urgent telephone call. All he hears on the other end is a chilling scream. Faring that something terrible has happened to his wife, Carlton rushes home, where he finds his wife is fine. He learns that he was connected to the call through a faulty telephone connection. To get to the bottom of things, Carlton hires detective Brown, who is soon on the trail of a gang of bank robbers.

== Notes ==
This was actress Rita Clermont's debut film.
