= Miss Venus =

1921 film directed by Ludwig Czerny

- Directed by: Ludwig Czerny
- Written by: Ludwig Czerny; Georg Okonkowsky
- Produced by: Ludwig Czerny; Otto Springefeld
- Starring: Ada Svedin; Manny Ziener; Charles Willy Kayser
- Cinematography: Ewald Daub
- Music by: Hans Ailbout; Tilmar Springefeld
- Production company: Noto-Film
- Release date: 16 September 1921
- Country: Germany
- Languages: Silent; German intertitles

Miss Venus is a 1921 German silent film directed by Ludwig Czerny and starring Ada Svedin, Manny Ziener and Charles Willy Kayser.

The film's sets were designed by the art director Robert Neppach.

== Cast ==
- Ada Svedin as Maud Goodin
- Manny Ziener as Thompson
- Charles Willy Kayser as Bobby Parker
- Johanna Ewald as Huckelbery

== Bibliography ==
- Bock, Hans-Michael & Bergfelder, Tim. The Concise CineGraph. Encyclopedia of German Cinema. Berghahn Books, 2009; ISBN 978-1-57181-655-9
