= Man Overboard (film) =

1921 film directed by Karl Grune

- Directed by: Karl Grune
- Written by: Georg Franck; Karl Grune
- Produced by: Hanns Lippmann
- Starring: Grit Hegesa; Erich Kaiser-Titz; Alfred Abel; Guido Herzfeld
- Cinematography: Karl Hasselmann
- Production company: Gloria-Film
- Distributed by: UFA
- Release date: 19 May 1921
- Country: Germany
- Languages: Silent; German intertitles

Man Overboard (German: Mann über Bord) is a 1921 German silent drama film directed by Karl Grune and starring Grit Hegesa, Erich Kaiser-Titz and Alfred Abel. It premiered in Berlin on 19 May 1921.

== Cast ==
- Alfred Abel
- Grit Hegesa
- Erich Kaiser-Titz
- Guido Herzfeld
- Ernst Hofmann
- Loni Nest as Das Kind
- Magda Madeleine
- Vilma von Mayburg
- Max Wogritsch

== Bibliography ==
- Grange, William. Cultural Chronicle of the Weimar Republic. Scarecrow Press, 2008.
