= The Lord of Hohenstein =

1917 film directed by Richard Oswald

- Directed by: Richard Oswald
- Written by: Octave Feuillet (novel Le Roman d'un jeune homme pauvre); Richard Oswald
- Produced by: Richard Oswald
- Starring: Bernd Aldor; Rita Clermont; Lupu Pick
- Cinematography: Max Fassbender
- Production company: Richard-Oswald-Produktion
- Release date: September 1917
- Running time: 72 minutes
- Country: Germany
- Languages: Silent; German intertitles

The Lord of Hohenstein (German: Der Schloßherr von Hohenstein) is a 1917 German silent drama film directed by Richard Oswald and starring Bernd Aldor, Rita Clermont and Lupu Pick.

The film's sets were designed by the art director Manfred Noa.

== Cast ==
- Bernd Aldor as Der junge Graf
- Rita Clermont as Tochter des Schlossherrn
- Lupu Pick as Schlossherr
- Albert Paul
- Reinhold Schünzel
- Ernst Ludwig
- Paula Barra
- Kissa von Sievers

== Bibliography ==
- Bock, Hans-Michael & Bergfelder, Tim. The Concise CineGraph. Encyclopedia of German Cinema. Berghahn Books, 2009.
