= Figures of the Night =

1920 film directed by Richard Oswald

- Directed by: Richard Oswald
- Screenplay by: Richard Oswald
- Based on: Eleagabal Kuperus by Karl Hans Strobl
- Produced by: Richard Oswald
- Starring: Paul Wegener; Reinhold Schünzel; Erna Morena; Conrad Veidt
- Cinematography: Carl Hoffmann
- Production company: Richard-Oswald-Produktion
- Distributed by: Decla-Bioscop
- Release date: 6 January 1920
- Running time: 106 minutes
- Country: Germany
- Languages: Silent; German intertitles

Figures of the Night (German: Nachtgestalten) is a 1920 German silent horror film written, directed and produced by Richard Oswald and starring Paul Wegener, Conrad Veidt, Reinhold Schünzel and Erna Morena. It is based on the novel Eleagabal Kuperus by Karl Hans Strobl. Strobl was the editor of a German horror fiction magazine called Der Orchideengarten, which was said to have been influenced by the works of Edgar Allan Poe. Strobl was an antisemitic and later willingly joined the Nazi Party, which may explain why he has become an obscure literary figure today.

The film's art direction was by Hans Dreier, and Carl Hoffmann handled the cinematography. Hoffmann went on to collaborate with such noted German directors as Fritz Lang and F.W. Murnau. It was filmed at the Babelsberg Studio in Berlin. No print of the film is known to survived, making it a lost film.

== Plot ==
Thomas Bezug, a multi-billionaire and the richest man in the world, is disabled and walks with crutches. He is devoted to his son, who lives in a cage, climbs trees and eats nuts. Bezug's servants include muscular men and men with dwarfism. His secretary is trying to gain control of Bezug's fortune. A dancer leaves him. An unemployed inventor then offers Bezug an invention said to extract oxygen from the air in exchange for the hand of Bezug's daughter, Elisabeth. Bezug intends to use it to blackmail the world and rule over all countries.

The film is of note since it co-starred both Wegener and Veidt in the same movie, both of whom later went on to star in two different film versions of The Student of Prague (1913 and 1926 respectively). Director Richard Oswald later cast Wegener in his 1932 film Uncanny Stories.

== Cast ==
- Paul Wegener as Thomas Bezug
- Reinhold Schünzel as Sekretär
- Erna Morena as Elisabeth, Bezugs Tochter
- Erik Charell as Arnold, Bezugs Sohn, Affe, gorilla
- Conrad Veidt as Clown
- Anita Berber as Tänzerin
- Paul Bildt as Erfinder
- Theodor Loos
- Willi Allen

== Bibliography ==
- Hutchings, Peter. The A to Z of Horror Cinema. Scarecrow Press, 2009.
