= Deceiver of the People =

1921 German silent film by Reinhold Schünzel

- Directed by: Reinhold Schünzel
- Written by: Walter Wassermann
- Starring: Charles Willy Kayser; Rita Clermont; Margarete Schlegel
- Cinematography: Eugen Hrich
- Production company: Berliner Avanti-Film
- Release date: 9 December 1921
- Country: Germany
- Languages: Silent; German intertitles

Deceiver of the People (German: Betrüger des Volkes) is a 1921 German silent film directed by Reinhold Schünzel and starring Charles Willy Kayser, Rita Clermont and Margarete Schlegel.

== Cast ==
- Charles Willy Kayser
- Rita Clermont
- Margarete Schlegel
- Fred Goebel
- Kurt Brenkendorf
- Josef Commer
- Richard Georg
- Adele Hartwig
- Ludwig Rex

== Bibliography ==
- Bock, Hans-Michael & Bergfelder, Tim. The Concise CineGraph. Encyclopedia of German Cinema. Berghahn Books, 2009.
