= Kurfürstendamm (film) =

1920 film directed by Richard Oswald

- The promotional collage for the film Kurfürstendamm features Conrad Veidt, Erna Morena, Asta Nielsen, Henry Tse, and Rudolf Forster.
- Directed by: Richard Oswald
- Written by: Richard Oswald
- Produced by: Richard Oswald
- Starring: Conrad Veidt; Asta Nielsen; Erna Morena
- Cinematography: Axel Graatkjær; Carl Hoffmann
- Music by: Hans May
- Production company: Richard-Oswald-Produktion
- Release date: 30 July 1920
- Running time: 89 minutes
- Country: Germany
- Languages: Silent; German intertitles

Kurfürstendamm is a 1920 German silent drama film directed by Richard Oswald and starring Conrad Veidt, Asta Nielsen, Erna Morena and Henry Sze. It is set on the Kurfürstendamm in central Berlin. It is now considered a lost film.

The film's sets were designed by the art director Hans Dreier. Director Oswald made this film the year after he made Weird Tales (1919), which also had starred Conrad Veidt. Cinematographer Carl Hoffmann went on to lens Der Januskopf (1920) and Dr. Mabuse, the Gambler (1922).

== Plot ==
Satan (Veidt) notices that a lot of souls entering Hell from Berlin have been coming in from the city's Kurfurstendamm district. He goes there and rents an apartment, disguised as a businessman. A doctor named Li (Henry Sze) takes him on a guided tour of the neighborhood's dens of sin. After he is beaten and robbed on the street, the Devil flees back to Hell where he feels much safer.

== Cast ==
- Conrad Veidt as Satan
- Asta Nielsen as Girl Lissy / Mulattin / Filmstar / Koechin Maria
- Erna Morena as Frau von Alady
- Henry Sze as Dr. Li
- Rosa Valetti as Frau Lesser
- Paul Morgan as Fritz
- Rudolf Forster as Ernst Duffer
- Theodor Loos as Raoul Hasenzwing

== Bibliography ==
- Soister, John T. (2002). Conrad Veidt on Screen: A Comprehensive Illustrated Filmography. Jefferson, NC: McFarland. ISBN 978-0-7864-1289-1.
