= Dance of Passions =

1922 film

- Directed by: Charles Willy Kayser
- Production company: Böttcher-Film
- Release date: 1 January 1922
- Country: Germany
- Languages: Silent; German intertitles

Dance of Passions (German:Tanz der Leidenschaft) is a 1922 German silent film directed by Charles Willy Kayser.

== Cast ==
- Rita Clermont as Evelyn
- Charles Willy Kayser as Edward
- Fritz Falkenberg as Inder
- Willy Kaiser-Heyl as Handelsherr
- Carlo Berger
- Trude Singer

== Bibliography ==
- Grange, William. Cultural Chronicle of the Weimar Republic. Scarecrow Press, 2008.
