= Prostitution (1919 film) =

1919 film directed by Richard Oswald

- Directed by: Richard Oswald
- Written by: Richard Oswald; Robert Liebmann
- Produced by: Richard Oswald
- Starring: Conrad Veidt; Reinhold Schünzel; Gussy Holl
- Cinematography: Max Fassbender; Karl Freund
- Production company: Richard-Oswald-Produktion
- Release dates: 19 March 1919 (Part I); 30 August 1919 (Part II)
- Running time: 126 minutes (Part I); 98 minutes (Part II)
- Country: Germany
- Languages: Silent; German intertitles

Prostitution (German: Die Prostitution) is a 1919 German silent drama film directed by Richard Oswald and starring Conrad Veidt, Reinhold Schünzel and Gussy Holl. It was released in two parts: Das gelbe Haus and Die sich verkaufen. It was one of several enlightenment films made during the era by Oswald. The physician Magnus Hirschfeld was an advisor on the production. The first part premiered at the Marmorhaus in Berlin.

== Cast ==
=== Part I ===
- Fritz Beckmann as Klaßen, Agent
- Anita Berber as Lola, dessen Tochter
- Gussy Holl as Hedwig
- Conrad Veidt as Alfred Werner
- Rudolf Klein-Rhoden as Hiller, Hausbesitzer
- Rita Clermont as Vera, Hillers Tochter
- Reinhold Schünzel as Karl Döring
- Ferdinand Bonn as Michalsky
- Marga Köhler as Madame Riedel
- Kissa von Sievers as Die Prostitution
- Preben J. Rist as Diener der Gerechtigkeit
- Emil Lind as alter Herr
- Werner Krauss as Mann
- Ernst Gronau
- Wilhelm Diegelmann

=== Part II ===
- Conrad Veidt
- Reinhold Schünzel
- Gertrude Hoffman
- Eduard von Winterstein
- Ilka Grüning
- Preben J. Rist
- Paul Morgan
- Kissa von Sievers
- Gussy Holl

== Bibliography ==
- Soister, John T. Conrad Veidt on Screen: A Comprehensive Illustrated Filmography. McFarland, 2002.
- Rogowski, Christian. The Many Faces of Weimar Cinema: Rediscovering Germany's Filmic Legacy. Camden House, 2010.
