= The Blonde Geisha =

1923 film directed by Ludwig Czerny

- Directed by: Ludwig Czerny
- Written by: Ludwig Czerny; Georg Okonkowsky
- Produced by: Ludwig Czerny; Otto Springefeld
- Starring: Ferry Sikla; Mizzi Schütz; Ada Svedin
- Cinematography: Willy Hameister
- Music by: Hans Ailbout; Richard Schönian
- Production company: Noto-Film
- Release date: March 1923
- Country: Austria
- Languages: Silent; German intertitles

The Blonde Geisha (German: Die blonde Geisha) is a 1923 Austrian silent film directed by Ludwig Czerny and starring Ferry Sikla, Mizzi Schütz and Ada Svedin.

The film's sets were designed by the art director Robert Neppach.

== Cast ==
- Ferry Sikla as Tobias Snippendale, Großkaufmann
- Mizzi Schütz as Virginy, seine Frau
- Ada Svedin as Mary, deren Tochter
- Charles Willy Kayser as Percival Geshford, Dirigent Willy Kaiser
- Friedrich Berger as Thomas Brown - Snippendales
- Karl Harbacher as Johnny - sein Sohn
- Pawel Markow as Jamagata - ein japanischer Marquis
- Friedel de Fries as Osukisan - seine Geisha

== Bibliography ==
- Alfred Krautz. International directory of cinematographers, set- and costume designers in film, Volume 4. Saur, 1984.
