= The Red Mouse =

1926 film directed by Rudolf Meinert

- Directed by: Rudolf Meinert
- Written by: Emanuel Alfieri
- Produced by: Rudolf Meinert
- Starring: Aud Egede-Nissen; Paul Richter; Charles Willy Kayser
- Cinematography: Ludwig Lippert
- Music by: Willy Schmidt-Gentner
- Production company: International Film-AG
- Distributed by: International Film-AG
- Release date: January 1926
- Country: Germany
- Languages: Silent; German intertitles

The Red Mouse (German: Die rote Maus) is a 1926 German silent film directed by Rudolf Meinert and starring Aud Egede-Nissen, Paul Richter, and Charles Willy Kayser. It premiered at the Marmorhaus in Berlin.

== Cast ==
- Aud Egede-Nissen as Fanny, die rote Maus
- Paul Richter
- Charles Willy Kayser
- Jaro Fürth
- Robert Hartberg
- Max Hochstetter
- Margarete Kupfer
- Maria Lingen
- Paul Morgan
- Ressel Orla
- Fritz Spira
- Aruth Wartan

== Bibliography ==
- Bock, Hans-Michael; Bergfelder, Tim, eds. (2009). The Concise Cinegraph: Encyclopaedia of German Cinema. New York: Berghahn Books. ISBN 978-1-57181-655-9.
