= Colomba (1918 film) =

- Directed by: Arzén von Cserépy
- Written by: Erna Morena; Emil Rameau (story)
- Produced by: Erna Morena
- Starring: Erna Morena; Werner Krauss; Conrad Veidt
- Cinematography: Max Fassbender
- Production company: Erna Morena-Film
- Distributed by: Erna Morena-Film
- Release date: 8 November 1918
- Running time: 81 minutes
- Country: Germany
- Languages: Silent; German intertitles

Colomba is a 1918 German silent drama film directed by Arzén von Cserépy and starring Erna Morena, Werner Krauss and Conrad Veidt. It is now considered a lost film.

The film's sets were designed by the art director Ernst Stern.

== Cast ==
- Erna Morena as Colomba
- Conrad Veidt as Henrik van Rhyn
- Werner Krauss as Gonzales
- Alfred Abel as Juan
- Maria Forescu
- Hilde Garden
- Valeska Gert

== Bibliography ==
- John T. Soister. Conrad Veidt on Screen: A Comprehensive Illustrated Filmography. McFarland, 2002.
