= The Spy (1917 German film) =

- Directed by: Karl Heiland
- Written by: Karl Heiland
- Starring: Ferdinand Bonn; Ellen Richter; Conrad Veidt
- Production company: Frankfurter Film
- Release date: 31 August 1917
- Running time: 90 minutes
- Country: Germany
- Languages: Silent; German intertitles

The Spy (German: Der Spion) is a 1917 German silent war espionage film directed by Karl Heiland and starring Ferdinand Bonn, Ellen Richter and Conrad Veidt. It was made as a propaganda film to support the German war effort during the First World War. It is now considered a lost film.

It was shot around Cologne and Düsseldorf.

== Synopsis ==
An Italian spy enters the German Empire in an attempt to commit sabotage and steal secret documents from a large armaments factory.

== Cast ==
- Ferdinand Bonn as Anzio, der Spion
- Ellen Richter as Gräfin Fonsecca
- Leontine Kühnberg as Else Bohl
- Conrad Veidt as Steinau
- Bruno Lopinski as Besitzer der Rüstungsfabrik

== Bibliography ==
- John T. Soister. Conrad Veidt on Screen: A Comprehensive Illustrated Filmography. McFarland, 2002.
