= Children of Darkness (1921 film) =

1921 film directed by E. A. Dupont

- Soviet poster
- German: Kinder der Finsternis
- Directed by: E. A. Dupont
- Written by: E. A. Dupont; Max Jungk; Julius Urgiß
- Produced by: Hanns Lippmann
- Starring: Grit Hegesa; Hans Mierendorff; Sybil Smolova
- Cinematography: Karl Freund; Helmar Lerski
- Production company: Gloria-Film
- Distributed by: UFA
- Release dates: 30 December 1921 (Part I); 21 January 1922 (Part II)
- Country: Germany
- Languages: Silent; German intertitles

Children of Darkness (German: Kinder der Finsternis) is a German silent drama film directed by E. A. Dupont and starring Grit Hegesa, Hans Mierendorff, and Sybil Smolova. It was released in two separate parts: Der Mann aus Neapel in December 1921 and Kämpfende Welten in January 1922. Both parts premiered at the Ufa-Palast am Zoo.

The film's sets were designed by the art director Paul Leni. It was shot in Berlin and Naples.

== Cast ==
- Grit Hegesa as Lilian Grey
- Hans Mierendorff as Enrico Flori
- Sybil Smolova as Francesca, Enricos Schwester
- Charles Puffy as Werkführer Geone
- Marija Leiko as Maria Geone
- Otto Treßler as Schiffskapitän Pool
- Adele Sandrock
- Friedrich Kühne
- Fritz Schulz
- Bernhard Goetzke
- Margarete Kupfer
- Paul Westermeier
