= Gold and Luck =

1923 film

- Directed by: Adolf Trotz
- Written by: Erich Pabst; Adolf Trotz
- Produced by: A. Hermann Trotz
- Starring: Conrad Veidt; Erna Morena; Eduard von Winterstein
- Cinematography: Paul Holzki; Max Lutze
- Production company: Mercator-Film
- Release date: 6 September 1923
- Country: Germany
- Languages: Silent; German intertitles

Gold and Luck (German: Glanz gegen Glück) is a 1923 German silent film directed by Adolf Trotz and starring Conrad Veidt, Erna Morena and Eduard von Winterstein. An independent production by the Hamburg-based Mercator-Film, it is now considered a lost film.

The film's sets were designed by the art director Robert Neppach.

== Cast ==
- Conrad Veidt as The Count
- Erna Morena as Schöne
- Eduard von Winterstein as Bauer
- Georg John as Wucherer
- Margarete Kupfer as Komödiantin
- Carl Heinz Klubertanz as Arbeiter
- Margot Nemo as Krankenschwester
- Walter Neumann as Gelehrter
- Erich Völker as Pfarrer

== Bibliography ==
- John T. Soister. Conrad Veidt on Screen: A Comprehensive Illustrated Filmography. McFarland, 2002.
