= Sybil Smolova =

Czech-Austrian dancer

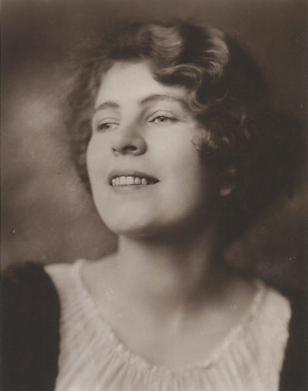
- Born: 17 September 1900; Prague, Austro-Hungarian Empire
- Died: July 6, 1972 (aged 71); Prague, Czechoslovakia
- Other names: Sybil Smolowa; Sybill Smolowa
- Occupation: Actress
- Years active: 1915–1933 (film)

Sybil Smolova was a Czech-Austrian dancer and film actress of the silent era.

== Selected filmography ==
- Werner Krafft (1916)
- Children of Darkness (1921)
- Gott, Mensch und Teufel (1924)
- Anna and Elizabeth (1933)

== Bibliography ==
- Jean Mitry. Histoire du cinéma: 1915-1925. Éditions universitaires, 1995.
