= Treasure of the Aztecs =

1921 film

- Directed by: Karl Heiland
- Written by: Karl Heiland; Bobby E. Lüthge
- Produced by: Karl Heiland
- Starring: Otto Gebühr; Theodor Loos
- Production company: Heinz Karl Heiland-Film
- Distributed by: UFA
- Release date: 30 September 1921
- Country: Germany
- Languages: Silent; German intertitles

Treasure of the Aztecs (German: Der Schatz der Azteken) is a 1921 German silent adventure film directed by Karl Heiland and starring Otto Gebühr and Theodor Loos.

== Cast ==
- Otto Gebühr
- Theodor Loos
- Loo Holl
- Friedrich Kühne

== Bibliography ==
- Hans-Michael Bock & Michael Töteberg. Das Ufa-Buch. Zweitausendeins, 1992.
