= Evening – Night – Morning =

1920 film

- Directed by: F. W. Murnau
- Written by: Rudolf Schneider
- Produced by: Erwin Rosner
- Starring: Bruno Ziener
- Cinematography: Eugen Hamm
- Production company: Helios Film
- Distributed by: Decla-Bioscop
- Release date: 24 September 1920
- Running time: 50 minutes
- Country: Germany
- Languages: Silent; German intertitles

Evening – Night – Morning (German: Abend – Nacht – Morgen) is a 1920 silent German drama film directed by F. W. Murnau. The film is considered to be lost. It was shot at the Weissensee Studios in Berlin. The film's sets were designed by the art director Robert Neppach.

== Plot ==
Maud (Gertrude Welcker) is the lover of Chester (Bruno Ziener), a millionaire who showers her with cash and gifts. Maud funnels some of her cash and jewels to her dissolute brother, Brillburn. Brillburn sees a particularly valuable pearl necklace in a shop window, and tells Maud to ask for it. She does, and Chester buys it for her. Chester tells his friend, the heavily indebted Prince (Carl von Balla), about the necklace.

That night, Prince breaks into Chester's home to steal the necklace. Not knowing where it is, he purposefully breaks a vase. Chester comes down to investigate, and Prince sees where he has hidden the necklace. Prince knocks Chester unconscious, then starts to fake Chester's suicide by hanging. He smokes a cigarette while typing out a suicide note. Just then, Brillburn enters the house to steal the necklace. Realizing he must stash the necklace or be caught, Prince goes into the adjacent coal room and hides the necklace. He removes a large lump of coal to make the pile look normal again.

Meanwhile, Brillburn finds Chester with a noose around his neck. He uses his dagger to cut the noose off, and losing a button from his coat in the process. Brillburn now flees, just as Chester throws the lump of coal out the window. The coal hits Brillburn on the head, knocking him cold.

Maud wakes and finds the house in disarray, preventing Prince from leaving. Det. Ward (Otto Gebühr) is summoned. He finds Brillburn unconscious on the lawn, and immediately suspects he assaulted and robbed Chester. When Det. Ward discovers the butt of Prince's expensive cigarette, he realizes another man was in the house. When questioned, Prince tells contradictory lies about why he was in the house. The lump of coal leads Ward to the stashed necklace. He waits for the robber to reappear and claim his loot, and duly arrests Prince.

== Cast ==
- Bruno Ziener as Chester, Maud's lover
- Gertrude Welcker as Maud
- Conrad Veidt as Brillburn, Maud's brother
- Otto Gebühr as Ward, a detective
- Carl von Balla as Prince, a gambler

== See also ==
- List of lost films
