= Lulu (1917 film) =

1917 film

- Directed by: Alexander Antalffy
- Written by: Frank Wedekind (play)
- Produced by: Paul Davidson
- Starring: Erna Morena; Adolf Klein; Harry Liedtke; Emil Jannings
- Cinematography: Frederik Fuglsang
- Production company: PAGU
- Release date: 1917
- Country: Germany
- Languages: Silent; German intertitles

Lulu is a 1917 German silent film directed by Alexander Antalffy and starring Erna Morena, Adolf Klein and Harry Liedtke. The film was considered "highly provocative" on its release.

The film's art direction was by Kurt Richter.

== Plot ==
The circus dancer Lulu is a thoroughly liberal being. Although she loves her former savior, the clown Alfredo, she begins a relationship with the noble Henri von Reithofen. Henri kills himself, ruined by the horrendous expenses for Lulu.

== Cast ==
- Erna Morena as Lulu
- Adolf Klein as Robert von Waldheim
- Harry Liedtke as Rudolf von Waldheim
- Rolf Brunner as Henri
- Emil Jannings as Alfredo, a clown

== Bibliography ==
- Isenberg, Noah William. Weimar Cinema: An Essential Guide to Classic Films of the Era. Columbia University Press, 2009.
