= Charles Willy Kayser =

German actor

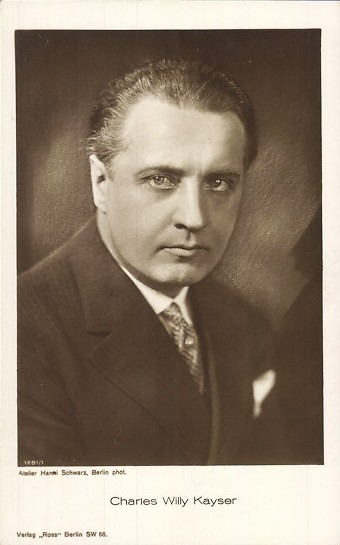
Charles Willy Kayser, ca. 1924

Charles Willy Kayser (28 January 1881 – 10 July 1942) was a German film actor.

He was born in Metz, Lorraine, Germany (now, Moselle, France) and died at the age of 61 in 1942.

== Selected filmography ==
- Anita Jo (1919)
- The Clan (1920)
- Va banque (1920)
- The House of Torment (1921)
- The Black Spider (1921)
- Miss Venus (1921)
- Miss Beryll (1921)
- The Eternal Curse (1921)
- Deceiver of the People (1921)
- Count Festenberg (1922)
- The Marriage of Princess Demidoff (1922)
- Dance of Passions (1922)
- The Golden Net (1922)
- Circus People (1922)
- The Blonde Geisha (1923)
- Slaves of Love (1924)
- Playing with Destiny (1924)
- Spring Awakening (1924)
- The Prince and the Maid (1924)
- Oh Those Glorious Old Student Days (1925)
- War in Peace (1925)
- Love's Joys and Woes (1926)
- The Eleven Schill Officers (1926)
- The Red Mouse (1926)
- Our Emden (1926)
- The Villa in Tiergarten Park (1927)
- The Vice of Humanity (1927)
- On the Banks of the River Weser (1927)
- The Lorelei (1927)
- Did You Fall in Love Along the Beautiful Rhine? (1927)
- Waterloo (1929)
- Masks (1929)
- Everyone Asks for Erika (1931)
- The Song of the Nations (1931)
- Victoria and Her Hussar (1931)
- Cruiser Emden (1932)
- Chauffeur Antoinette (1932)
- Trenck (1932)
- When the Village Music Plays on Sunday Nights (1933)
- The Grey Lady (1937)
- The Beaver Coat (1937)
- Red Orchids (1938)
- The Holm Murder Case (1938)
- The Tiger of Eschnapur (1938)
- Fasching (1939)
- The Girl from Barnhelm (1940)
- The Eternal Spring (1940)
- Enemies (1940)
- Comrades (1941)
- Venus on Trial (1941)
