= Victoria (1935 film) =

- Directed by: Carl Hoffmann
- Written by: Knut Hamsun (novel); Robert A. Stemmle; Frederick Kohner; Rolf Meyer
- Starring: Luise Ullrich; Mathias Wieman; Alfred Abel
- Cinematography: Günther Anders
- Edited by: Walter von Bonhorst
- Music by: Theo Mackeben
- Production company: Minerva Tonfilm
- Distributed by: Tobis Film; Sascha Film (Austria)
- Release date: 27 November 1935
- Running time: 91 minutes
- Country: Germany
- Language: German

Victoria (German: Viktoria) is a 1935 German drama film directed by Carl Hoffmann and starring Luise Ullrich, Mathias Wieman and Alfred Abel. It is an adaptation of Knut Hamsun's Victoria. It was made at the Johannisthal Studios of Tobis Film in Berlin. The film's sets were designed by the art director Kurt Herlth and Werner Schlichting. It was shot on location in Bergen in Norway.

== Main cast ==
- Luise Ullrich as Viktoria
- Mathias Wieman as Johannes
- Alfred Abel as Der Schloßherr
- Erna Morena as Die Schloßherrin
- Helmut Hoffmann as Ditlef
- Theodor Loos as Der Kammerherr
- Maria Seidler as Die Kammerherrin
- Heinz von Cleve as Otto
- Bernhard Goetzke as Der Müller, Vater Johannes'
- Margarete Schön as Die Müllerin, Mutter Johannes'
- Paul Bildt as Professor

== Bibliography ==
- Thomas Elsaesser & Michael Wedel. The BFI companion to German cinema. British Film Institute, 1999.
- Klaus, Ulrich J. Deutsche Tonfilme: Jahrgang 1935. Klaus-Archiv, 1988.
