= Grit Hegesa =

German actress

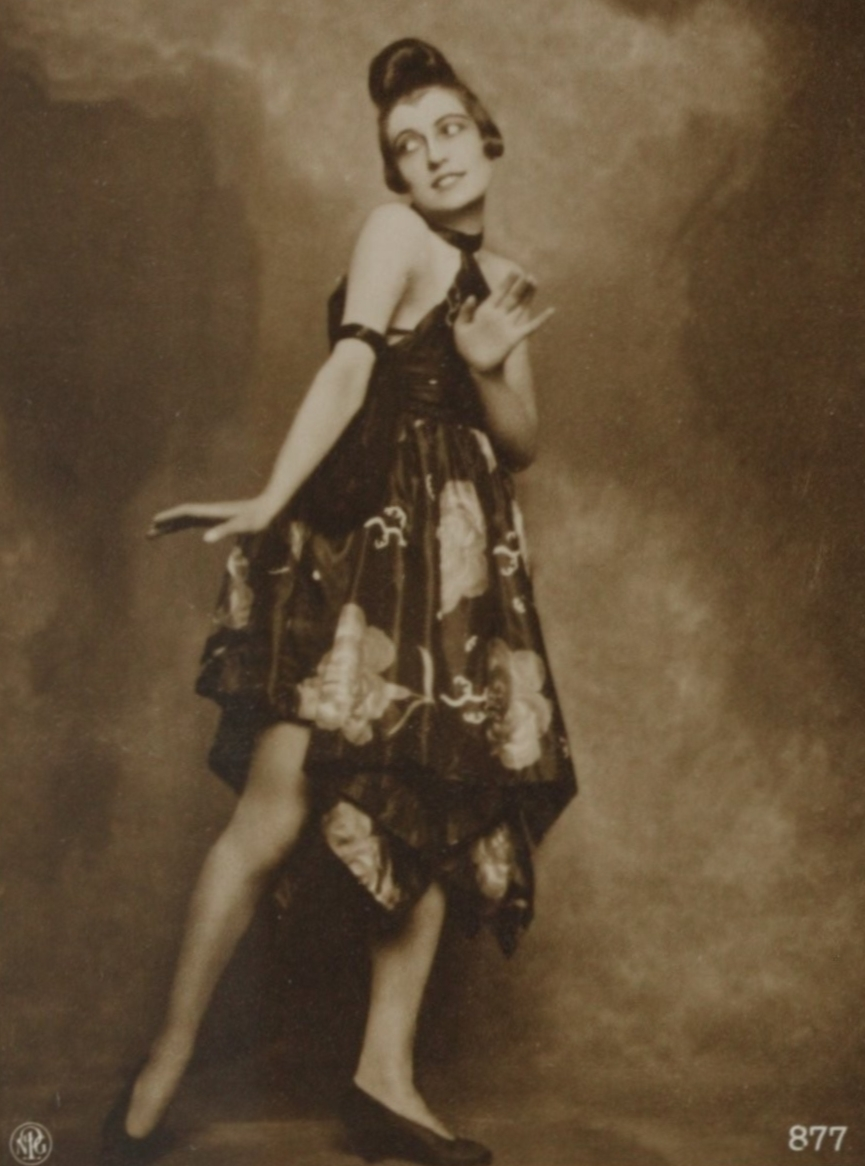
- Born: Caroline Margaretha Schmidt; 23 December 1891; Niederlahnstein, German Empire
- Died: January 17, 1972 (aged 80); Munich, West Germany
- Occupations: Film actor Dancer
- Years active: 1917-1929 (film)

Grit Hegesa (23 December 1891 – 17 January 1972) was a German dancer and silent film actress. She appeared in seventeen films. She was born Caroline Margaretha Schmidt.

== Selected filmography ==
- Madness (1919)
- Whitechapel (1920)
- The White Peacock (1920)
- Man Overboard (1921)
- Night and No Morning (1921)
- Children of Darkness (1921)
- Fräulein Else (1929)

== Bibliography ==
- Prawer, S.S. Between Two Worlds: The Jewish Presence in German and Austrian Film, 1910-1933. Berkeley: University of California Press, 1997. (Section "Grit Hegesa" online)
- Hans Joachim Bodenbach, "Grit Hegesa, Tänzerin und Stummfilmstar aus Niederlahnstein", In: Rhein-Lahn-Kreis Heimatjahrbuch 2002, Bad Ems, pp. 147–153
