= The Vice of Gambling =

1923 film directed by Dimitri Buchowetzki

- Directed by: Dimitri Buchowetzki
- Written by: Dimitri Buchowetzki
- Produced by: Erwin Rosner
- Starring: Alfred Abel; Willy Kaiser-Heyl; Theodor Loos
- Cinematography: Mutz Greenbaum
- Production company: Helios Film
- Release date: 27 August 1923
- Country: Germany
- Languages: Silent; German intertitles

The Vice of Gambling (German: Das Laster des Spiels) is a 1923 German silent film directed by Dimitri Buchowetzki and starring Alfred Abel, Willy Kaiser-Heyl, and Theodor Loos.

The film's sets were designed by the art director Hans Dreier.

== Cast ==
- Alfred Abel
- Willy Kaiser-Heyl
- Theodor Loos
- Sybill Morel

== Bibliography ==
- Bock, Hans-Michael; Bergfelder, Tim, eds. (2009). The Concise Cinegraph: Encyclopaedia of German Cinema. New York: Berghahn Books. ISBN 978-1-57181-655-9.
