= Desire (1921 film) =

1921 film

Desire (Sehnsucht)
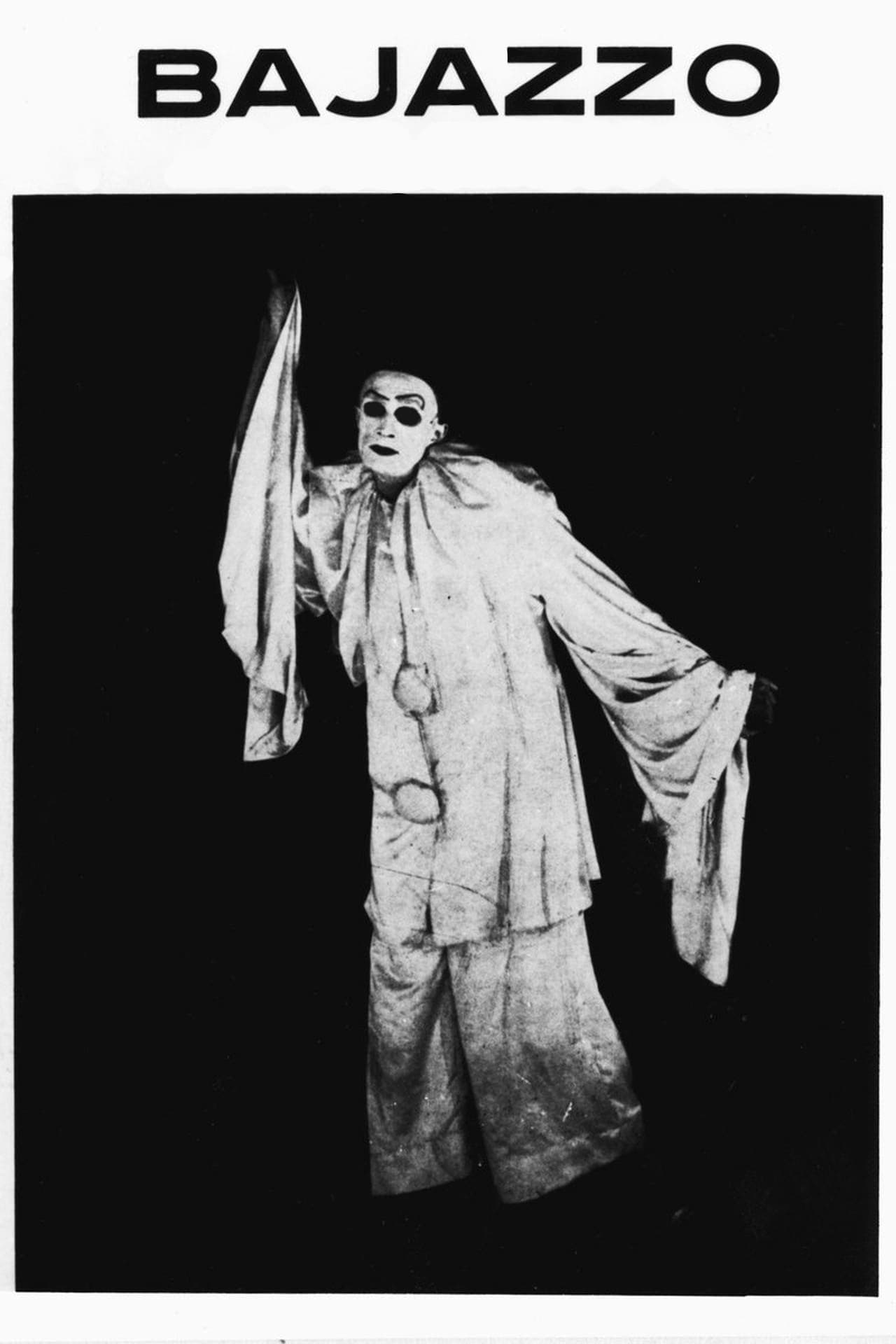
- Poster
- Directed by: F. W. Murnau
- Written by: Carl Heinz Jarosy
- Starring: Conrad Veidt; Gussy Holl
- Cinematography: Carl Hoffmann
- Production company: Mosch-Film
- Distributed by: Lipow Film
- Release date: February 1921
- Running time: 59 minutes
- Country: Weimar Republic
- Languages: Silent film; German intertitles

Desire (German: Sehnsucht) is a 1921 silent film directed by F. W. Murnau and starring Conrad Veidt. It tells the story of a male dancer who falls in love with a grand duchess, only to be arrested, and his subsequent attempt to find the duchess.

As of 2020, it is believed to be a lost film as no prints are known to exist. Robert Neppach worked as the film's art director.

== Plot ==
A young student from Russia (Conrad Veidt) is studying (art or dancing, records of the film are unclear) in Geneva, Switzerland. He wants to go home for a visit, but has no funds. A group of Nihilists need someone to go to Russia for some plot (that plot is not clear, as the film has been lost). The student allows himself to be recruited as their agent, and he goes to Russia.

In Russia, the student meets a young, beautiful Grand Duchess (Gussy Holl), and they fall in love. The student attempts to complete his plot, but is arrested. After some time in prison, he escapes and begins searching for his lost lover. After some time, he discovers she died while he was in prison.

== Cast ==
- Conrad Veidt as Dancer
- Gussy Holl as Grand Duchess
- Eugen Klöpfer
- Margarete Schlegel as Marja
- Paul Graetz
- Helene Gray
- Danny Guertler
- Albert Bennefeld
- Marcela Gremo
- Ellen Bolan
- Gilbert Gooley

== See also ==
- List of lost films
