= Frau Eva =

1916 German silent drama film

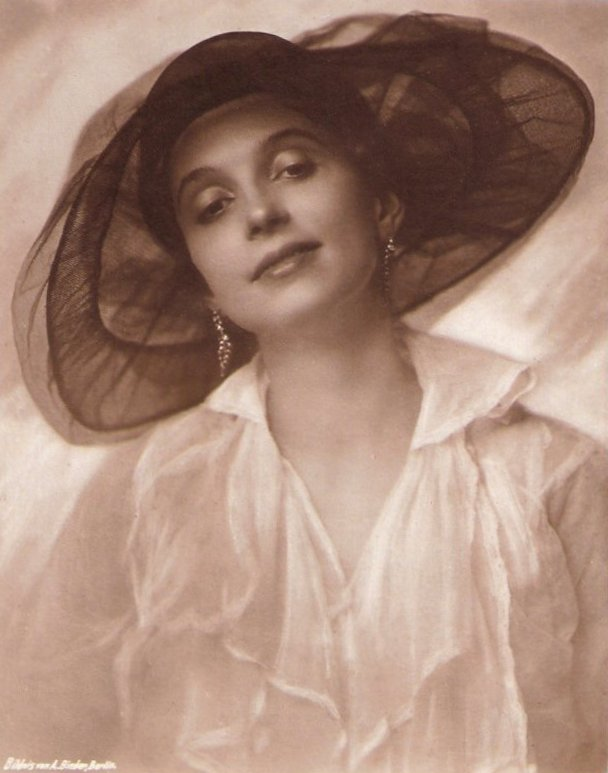
- Erna Morena as Frau Eva
- Directed by: Robert Wiene
- Written by: Alphonse Daudet (novel); Artur Berger; Robert Wiene
- Produced by: Oskar Messter
- Starring: Erna Morena; Emil Jannings; Theodor Loos; Margarete Kupfer
- Cinematography: Karl Freund
- Music by: Giuseppe Becce
- Production company: Messter Film
- Distributed by: Hansa Film
- Release date: February 1916
- Country: Germany
- Languages: Silent; German intertitles

Frau Eva is a 1916 German silent drama film directed by Robert Wiene and starring Erna Morena, Emil Jannings and Theodor Loos. It was based on the 1874 novel Fromont and Risler by Alphonse Daudet. The film was Jannings' first starring role, his previous appearance having been as an extra in Im Schützengraben.

== Plot ==
An ambitious wife spends all of her husband's hard-earned money and then commits suicide out of remorse.

== Cast ==
- Erna Morena - Eva
- Emil Jannings
- Theodor Loos
- Margarete Kupfer
- Alexander Antalffy

== Bibliography ==
- Jung, Uli & Schatzberg, Walter. Beyond Caligari: The Films of Robert Wiene. Berghahn Books, 1999.
