= Robert Neppach =

Austrian art director and film producer

- Born: 2 March 1890; Vienna, Austro-Hungarian Empire
- Died: 18 August 1939 (aged 49); Zurich, Switzerland
- Occupations: Film producer Art director
- Years active: 1919–1937 (film)

Robert Neppach (2 March 1890 – 18 August 1939) was an Austrian architect, film producer and art director. Neppach worked from 1919 in the German film industry. He oversaw the art direction of over 80 films during his career, including F.W. Murnau's Desire (1921) and Richard Oswald's Lucrezia Borgia (1922). Neppach was comparatively unusual among set designers during the era in having university training.

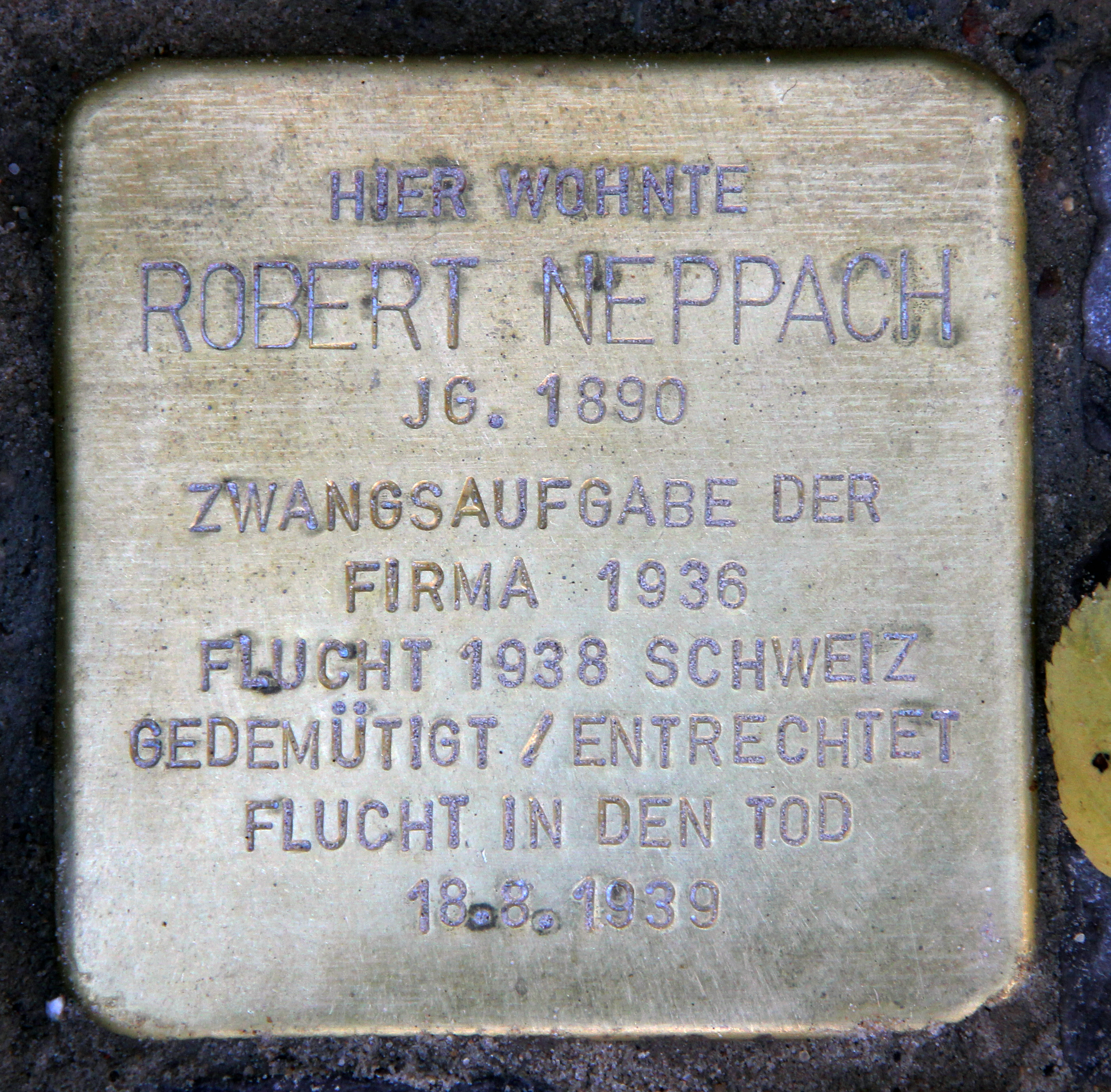
Stolperstein outside Neppach's home at Nachodstraße 22, Berlin

In 1932, he switched to concentrate on film production. In May 1933, his first wife Nelly, a successful tennis player, took her life because of the discrimination and prosecution of Jews in Nazi Germany. He married Grete Walter, daughter of the conductor Bruno Walter in Autumn 1933. With his Jewish wife, life grew increasingly difficult for him under the Nazis. He began to work as an architect again, and the couple emigrated to Switzerland. They lived apart and Neppach's wife, who had an affair with Ezio Pinza filed for divorce. When they met to discuss the matter Neppach first shot his wife and then himself.

== Selected filmography ==
=== Art director ===
- Die Frau im Käfig (1919)
- Die Augen im Walde (1919)
- Comrades (1919)
- Das Glück der Irren (1919)
- Können Gedanken töten?(1920)
- The Night at Goldenhall (1920)
- The Woman Without a Soul (1920)
- Va banque (1920)
- Das Kussverbot (1920)
- The Wandering Image (1920)
- Eternal River (1920)
- Evening – Night – Morning (1920)
- From Morn to Midnight (1920)
- The Rats (1921)
- Desire (1921)
- Miss Venus (1921)
- The Eternal Struggle (1921)
- The Fateful Day (1921)
- The House on the Moon (1921)
- Love at the Wheel (1921)
- The Amazon (1921)
- Hashish, the Paradise of Hell (1921)
- Lucrezia Borgia (1922)
- His Excellency from Madagascar (1922)
- The Stream (1922)
- The Game with Women (1922)
- The Golden Net (1922)
- Gold and Luck (1923)
- Earth Spirit (1923)
- The Blonde Geisha (1923)
- Bob and Mary (1923)
- Bismarck (1925)
- The Director General (1925)
- The Man Who Sold Himself (1925)
- The Painter and His Model (1925)
- Darling, Count the Cash (1926)
- Gretchen Schubert (1926)
- The Master of Death (1926)
- The Son of Hannibal (1926)
- At the Edge of the World (1927)
- Princess Olala (1928)
- The President (1928)
- Parisiennes (1928)
- The Abduction of the Sabine Women (1928)
- Love's Masquerade (1928)
- Vienna, City of My Dreams (1928)
- The Woman One Longs For (1929)
- The Hero of Every Girl's Dream (1929)
- Father and Son (1929)
- The Green Monocle (1929)
- The Merry Widower (1929)
- His Best Friend (1929)
- Men Without Work (1929)
- My Daughter's Tutor (1929)
- Katharina Knie (1929)
- The Song Is Ended (1930)
- People in the Fire (1930)
- Two Hearts in Waltz Time (1930)
- Him or Me (1930)
- A Gentleman for Hire (1930)
- Delicatessen (1930)
- The Adventurer of Tunis (1931)
- Grock (1931)
- Everyone Asks for Erika (1931)
- Panic in Chicago (1931)
- The Street Song (1931)
- Weekend in Paradise (1931)
- The Company's in Love (1932)

=== Producer ===
- The Heath Is Green (1932)
- The First Right of the Child (1932)
- Dream of the Rhine (1933)
- Little Man, What Now? (1933)
- Punks Arrives from America (1935)
- Pillars of Society (1935)
- Doctor Engel (1936)
- Kater Lampe (1936)
- Hilde Petersen postlagernd (1936)

=== Director ===
- Love and the First Railway (1934)

== Bibliography ==
- Weniger, Kay: „Es wird im Leben dir mehr genommen als gegeben ...“. Lexikon der aus Deutschland und Österreich emigrierten Filmschaffenden 1933 bis 1945. Eine Gesamtübersicht. ACABUS Verlag, Hamburg 2011, ISBN 978-3-86282-049-8, p. 364.
- Bergfelder, Tim, Harris, Sue & Street, Sarah. Film Architecture and the Transnational Imagination: Set Design in 1930s European Cinema. Amsterdam University Press, 2007.
- Eisner, Lotte H. The Haunted Screen: Expressionism in the German Cinema and the Influence of Max Reinhardt. University of California Press, 2008.
