= Theodor Loos =

German actor (1883–1954)

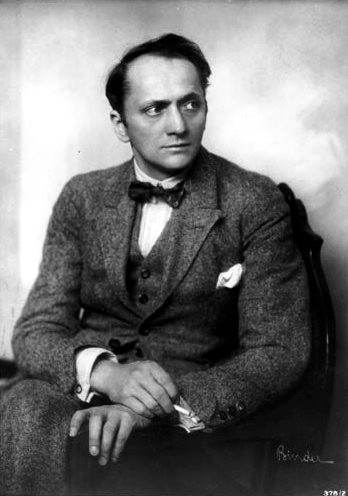
- Theodor Loos, c. 1920.
- Born: Theodor August Konrad Loos; 18 May 1883; Zwingenberg, Grand Duchy of Hesse, German Empire
- Died: 27 June 1954 (aged 71); Stuttgart, Baden-Württemberg, West Germany
- Occupation: Actor
- Years active: 1916–1954

Theodor August Konrad Loos (18 May 1883 – 27 June 1954) was a German actor.

The son of a watchmaker and instruments manufacturer, he left secondary school prematurely and worked for three years at an export firm for music instruments in Leipzig, and after that for his uncle, an art dealer in Berlin. He decided though to become an actor.

His theater engagements led him to Leipzig, Danzig and Frankfurt am Main, then to Berlin where he acted from 1912 to 1945 at different theaters. In the 1930s he could be seen performing in classic theater, on over 400 occasions in Peer Gynt alone.

From 1913 he performed in more than 170 feature films, initially silent films. He remains perhaps best-known for his numerous roles in the films of Fritz Lang. During the Third Reich Loos was a member of the Advisory Council (Präsidialrat) of the president of the Reichsfilmkammer.

After the end of the war, Loos returned to the theater. From August 1949 he was a member of the Staatstheater Stuttgart. His two sons both died in the Second World War.

== Selected filmography ==
- Das goldene Bett (1913)
- Die Eisbraut (1913)
- Im Schützengraben (1913)
- Das Hochstapler-Trio (1914)
- Das Haus ohne Tür (1914)
- Thora West (1915)
- Maria Niemand und ihre zwölf Väter (1915)
- Doch die Liebe fand einen Weg (1915)
- Der geheimnisvolle Wanderer (1915)
- Frau Eva (1916)
- Abseits vom Glück (1916) – Tonio
- Homunculus (1916–1917, part 1–5) – Sven Friedland
- Friedrich Werders Sendung (1916) – Father / Son
- Die Richterin von Solvigsholm (1916)
- Die grüne Phiole (1916)
- Das Wunder der Madonna (1916) – Bildhauer
- Das Haus der Leidenschaften (1916)
- Das letzte Spiel (1917) – Prince / Actor
- Christa Hartungen (1917) – Reginald Dickens
- Die Sündenkette (1917)
- Das Gewissen des Andern (1917)
- Das Buch des Lasters (1917) – Horst von Franken
- Frau Eva (1917)
- ...und führe uns nicht in Versuchung (1917) – Laienbruder Franziskus
- Die schwarze Loo (1917)
- Der geigende Tod (1917) – Jord
- Das Licht in der Nacht (1917) – Percy Wiggins
- Let There Be Light (1917)
- Robin Morris (1918) – Robin Morris
- Es werde Licht! (1918, part 2, 3) – Professor Wolfgang Sandow/ Hans
- Precious Stones (1918, Short) – Pieter Swandam
- Die Singende Hand (1918) – Leonid Heller
- Der Letzte Gang (1919) – Bildhauer Hell
- Treu der Jugend (1919) – Paul Günther
- Stiefkinder des Glücks (1919) – Hans von Holm
- Spiele eines Milliardärs (1919)
- Nach dem Gesetz (1919) – Artzt Albert Holm
- Die Toten kehren wieder – Enoch Arden (1919) – Enoch Arden
- Die Launen eines Milliardärs (1919)
- Das Lied der Nornen (1919) – Eldar Asselder
- Figures of the Night (1920)
- Die Nacht der Prüfung (1920)
- The Merry-Go-Round (1920) – Fritz Peters
- Die Frau ohne Dienstag (1920) – Poet
- Der Menschheit Anwalt (1920) – Mönch – Novice Severin
- Kurfürstendamm (1920) – Raoul Hasenzwing
- Christian Wahnschaffe (1920–1921, part 1, 2) – Amadeus Voß
- Helmsman Holk (1920) – Jacon Siebensee
- Sehnende Liebe (1920)
- Im Banne der Suggestion (1920)
- Die Spielerin (1920)
- Die Geheimnisse von New York (1920)
- Das Wüstengrab (1920)
- Dämmernde Nächte (1920) – Sverre
- Die Geschwister Barelli (1921)
- The House in Dragon Street (1921) – Funke, Lias Bräutigam
- Der zeugende Tod (1921) – Sylvester Sender, Maler
- The Solemn Oath (1921) – Count Horst
- Betrogene Betrüger (1921)
- Die kleine Dagmar (1921) – Maler Hennecke
- Treasure of the Aztecs (1921)
- Lady Hamilton (1921) – George Romney
- Die Schuldige (1921) – Pastor Behrens
- Der rätselhafte Tod (1921)
- Schuld und Sühne (1922)
- Othello (1922) – Cassio
- Hannele's Journey to Heaven (1922) – Lehrer Gottwald
- Youth (1922) – Kapellan Schigorski
- Macht der Versuchung (1922)
- It Illuminates, My Dear (1922) – Count Biron
- Der Kampf ums Ich (1922)
- Das blinde Glück (1922)
- Friedrich Schiller (1923) – Friedrich Schiller
- The Vice of Gambling (1923)
- Das Kabinett des Dr. Segato (1923)
- Die Nibelungen (1924) – King Gunther
- Debit and Credit (1924) – Freiherr von Rothensattel
- Claire (1924)
- Aufstieg der kleinen Lilian (1925)
- What the Stones Tell (1925)
- Our Heavenly Bodies (1925)
- Goetz von Berlichingen of the Iron Hand (1925) – Franz von Sickingen
- Manon Lescaut (1926) – Tiberge
- Women of Passion (1926) – Mr. von Golitzki
- The Violet Eater (1926) – Officer Eckhoff
- Sword and Shield (1926) – Mr. von Golitzki
- Das Lebenslied (1926)
- Metropolis (1927) – Josaphat / Joseph
- Liebeshandel (1927)
- The Impostor (1927) – Prof. Gehrsdorf
- Prinz Louis Ferdinand (1927) – Ernst Moritz Arndt
- Lord of the Night (1927) – Dr. Lanz
- The Weavers (1927) – Bäcker
- Queen Louise (1927–1928, part 1, 2) – Count Hardenberg
- Bigamie (1927) – Lawyer
- Petronella (1927) – Pfarrer Imboden
- Luther (1928) – Melanchthon
- Spies (1928) – Handelsminister (uncredited)
- Sensations-Prozess (1928)
- The Schorrsiegel Affair (1928) – Mr. van der Wal
- Cry for Help (1928)
- Homecoming (1928)
- Anastasia, the False Czar's Daughter (1928) – Grand Duke Michael
- Diana (1929)
- The Night of Terror (1929) – Jegorow
- § 173 St.G.B. Blutschande (1929) – Pastor
- Atlantik (1929) – Pastor Wagner
- Napoleon at Saint Helena (1929) – Capt. Pionkowski
- Ludwig II, King of Bavaria (1929) – Dr. von Gudden
- The Great Longing (1930) – Regisseur Hall
- Boycott (1930) – Dr.Hermann
- The Flute Concert of Sanssouci (1930) – Menzel
- Two People (1930) – Prior
- 1914 (1931) – Paléologue
- Ariane (1931) – Dr. Hans Adameit
- The Case of Colonel Redl (1931) – General Alfred Redl
- I Go Out and You Stay Here (1931) – Konstantin von Haller
- Vertauschte Gesichter (1931) – Peter van Diemen
- M (1931) – Inspector Groeber
- In the Employ of the Secret Service (1931) – Dubbin
- The Other Side (1931) – Lieutenant Osborne
- Yorck (1931) – Roder
- Holzapfel Knows Everything (1932) – Konsul van Doeren
- Under False Flag (1932) – Rakowski
- Rasputin, Demon with Women (1932) – Pope
- A Shot at Dawn (1932) – Bachmann
- The Eleven Schill Officers (1932) – Officer Hans Küffer
- Eight Girls in a Boat (1932) – Baumeister Engelhardt
- The Heath Is Green (1932) – Lüder Lüdersen
- Death Over Shanghai (1932) – James Biggers
- Trenck (1932) – Frederick II
- Marshal Forwards (1932) – King Friedrich Wilhelm III of Prussia
- Secret of the Blue Room (1932) – Robert von Hellberg
- Sacred Waters (1932) – Landowner
- The Invisible Front (1933) – Henrik Thomsen
- Was wissen denn Männer (1933)
- Die blonde Christl (1933) – Benekdikt Oberbucher
- Spies at Work (1933) – Davila
- The Peak Scaler (1933) – Man in the hotel
- The Testament of Dr. Mabuse (1933) – Dr. Kramm
- Ways to a Good Marriage (1933) – Dr. von Bergen
- A Certain Mr. Gran (1933)
- The Judas of Tyrol (1933) – Commissioner
- Höllentempo (1933) – Mr. von Dermor
- William Tell (1934) – Werner Stauffacher
- Elisabeth and the Fool (1934) – Thomas
- The Girlfriend of a Big Man (1934) – Dr. Nordegg
- A Woman With Power of Attorney (1934) – Holsten
- Hanneles Himmelfahrt (1934) – Lehrer Gottwald
- The Sporck Battalion (1934) – Oberförster Rüdiger
- The Old and the Young King (1935) – Von Rochow
- Joan of Arc (1935) – Dunois
- Stradivari (1935) – Lazarettkommandant
- The Green Domino (1935) – Mr. von Falck
- The Girl from the Marsh Croft (1935) – Richter
- Victoria (1935) – Chambellan
- The Student of Prague (1935) – Dr. Carpis
- Henker, Frauen und Soldaten (1935)
- The Higher Command (1935) – Meneckes Mitarbeiter
- The Adventurer of Paris (1936) – Sir Henry Vinston
- Schlußakkord (1936) – Professor Obereit
- The Hour of Temptation (1936) – Professor Rüdiger
- The Traitor (1936) – Dr. Auer
- White Slaves (1937) – Governor
- The Ruler (1937) – Pastor Immoos
- The Glass Ball (1937) – Dr. Sylten
- The Mystery of Betty Bonn (1938) – Prosecutor Trevor
- Monika (1938) – Professor Waldeck
- The Muzzle (1938) – Prosecutor General
- Comrades at Sea (1938) – Admiral Brackhusen
- Secret Code LB 17 (1938) – Police Prefect
- Shadows Over St. Pauli (1938) – John Carstens
- Parkstrasse 13 (1939) – Dr. Elken
- Robert Koch (1939) – Dr. Georg Gaffky
- Roman eines Arztes (1939) – Steffen
- Jud Süß (1940) – Franz Joseph Freiherr von Remchingen
- Counterfeiters (1940) – Professor Bassi
- Kora Terry (1940)
- Alarm (1941) – Rentner Ophagen
- Heimaterde (1941)
- The Thing About Styx (1942) – Lenski
- Rembrandt (1942) – Jan Six
- Andreas Schlüter (1942) – Frederick III.
- Die Entlassung (1942) – Kaiser Wilhelm I.
- Titanic (1943) – Privy Councillor Bergmann (uncredited)
- Journey into the Past (1943) – Dr. Fritz Elmers
- Gabriele Dambrone (1943) – Dr. Christopher
- Philharmonic (1944) – Herbert Hartwig
- Shiva und die Galgenblume (1945) – Commissioner Pattberg
- Der Fall Molander (1945)
- The Millionaire (1947) – Schreyegg
- The Murder Trial of Doctor Jordan (1949)
- Stars Over Colombo (1953) – Religious
- The Prisoner of the Maharaja (1954) – Religious
- Roses from the South (1954) – Minister (final film role)
