= Gussy Holl =

German actress (1888–1966)

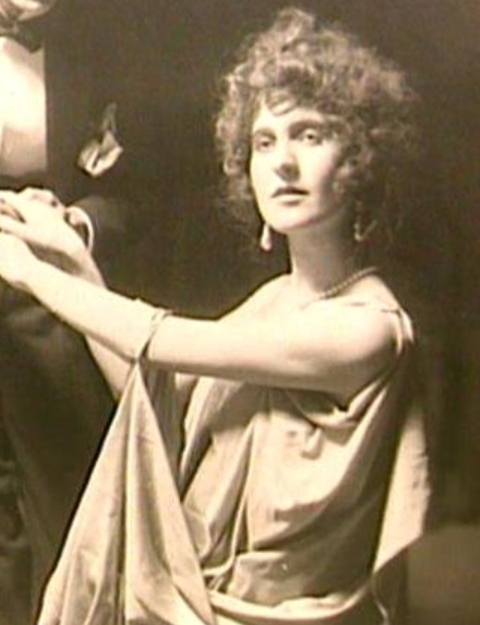
- Holl in Desire, 1921
- Born: Auguste Marie Christine Holl; 22 February 1888; Frankfurt am Main, Germany
- Died: 16 July 1966 (aged 78); Salzburg, Austria
- Other name: Auguste Marie Christine Veidt
- Years active: 1913–1921 (film)
- Spouses: Conrad Veidt (m. 1918; div. 1922) Emil Jannings (m. 1923; died 1950)
- Children: 1

Auguste Marie Christine Holl (22 February 1888 – 16 July 1966) was a German actress and singer. Holl was briefly a silent film star during the early Weimar Republic, appearing in productions such as F. W. Murnau's Desire (1921). As of 2021, only one of her films survives.

== Biography ==
Auguste Marie Christine Holl was born on 22 February 1888 in Frankfurt am Main to Georg Holl and Marie Christine Holl. She had a brother named Georg.

Holl was a performer at Schall und Rauch, a cabaret in Berlin that had been founded by Max Reinhardt in 1901. Nicknamed the silver-blonde elegant witch, she sang and acted. She inspired multiple songs by Walter Mehring and Kurt Tucholsky, including "The Blonde Lady Sings" and "Petronella", a parody of the Berlin trend for nudity on stage, and a dig at strip clubs. Tucholsky wrote of Holl, "Frankfurt has produced two great men: Goethe and Gussy Holl ... She can do anything: hate and love, stroke and beat, sing and speak – there is no tone that is not part of her lyre." and, "Unlike any other German artist, this rare and glorious woman is qualified and destined to be the great political singer. I won't even mention her tremendous art of parody and her ability to flit over the most daring things with a gracious leap – we are only interested in the artist who has more to say to a hall full of politically thinking people than ten journalists could." In addition to being the number one cabaret star in the Weimar Republic, she was also a successful impersonator in New York.

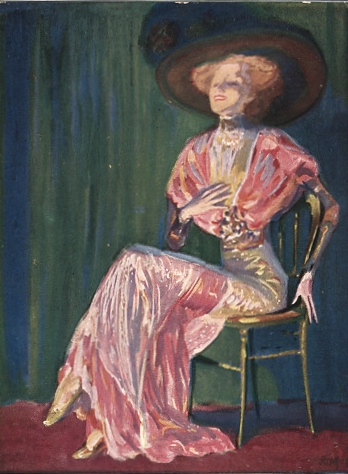
Portrait of Gussy Holl by Paul Rieth, c. 1918

Holl made her film debut in the 1913 short The Sky Monster, also called America to Europe in an Airship or Kidnapped in Midair. The film was released in America by Universal in 1914. She did not appear in another film until 1919, when she starred in Richard Oswald's enlightenment film Prostitution alongside her husband, Conrad Veidt, and Reinhold Schünzel. She next appeared in Madness (1919), followed by The Night at Goldenhall (1920), both of which were directed by and starred Veidt. Film-Kurier wrote of Holl's performance in Madness, "Gussy Holl should give up [film] acting. It is pitiful to watch this artist – who is peerless in her own sphere – at a task which she cannot master despite her best efforts." Holl said to Lotte Eisner of the film, "The film was not only called Madness, but it was madness as well, and I can't remember anything about the story."

Holl's final screen appearance was in Desire (1921).

Holl was married twice; her first marriage was to actor Conrad Veidt. Their large wedding took place on 10 June 1918. They separated in 1919, but attempted to reconcile multiple times. The two divorced in 1922, and Holl later told Françoise Rosay, "I excused a lot of his failings and whims because I loved him. But one day he did something to me that I couldn’t forgive. I was singing that evening at the cabaret. I left him home and he told me: 'I invited a few friends; we'll dine while we wait for you.' And it just so happened I had received a new dress from Paris. That evening, after work, I arrived home and what do I see? All these gentlemen dressed as women. And Conrad had put on my Paris dress. At this point, I divorced!"

Holl married Emil Jannings on 28 July 1923, and remained with him until his death in 1950. Neither marriage produced children, although Holl was stepmother to Jannings' daughter Ruth-Maria. Holl had a daughter of her own called "Boubie"; the father was allegedly a close relative of Wilhelm II.

Holl died on 16 July 1966 in Salzburg.

== Filmography ==
- The Sky Monster (1913)
- Prostitution (1919) *Lost film
- Madness (1919) *Lost film
- The Night at Goldenhall (1920) *Lost film
- People in Ecstasy (1921) *Lost film
- Desire (1921) *Lost film

== Bibliography ==
- Eisner, Lotte H. F. W. Murnau. University of California Press, 1973.
