= People in Ecstasy =

1921 film

- Directed by: Julius Geisendörfer
- Written by: Artur Landsberger
- Starring: Conrad Veidt
- Cinematography: Ernst Vachenauer
- Production company: Internationale Film
- Distributed by: Doktram-Film
- Release date: 6 January 1921
- Country: Germany
- Languages: Silent; German intertitles

People in Ecstasy (German: Menschen im Rausch) is a 1921 German silent film directed by Julius Geisendörfer and starring Conrad Veidt.

== Cast ==
- Conrad Veidt as Professor Munk, Komponist
- Grete Berger as Maria, seine Frau
- Fritz Alberti as Feld, Operndirektor
- Robert Garrison as Hamburger, Theateragent
- Julius Geisendörfer as Anton, ein Zuhälter
- Gussy Holl
- Atti Ottendörfer
- Aenne Ullstein
- Heinz Ullstein
- Klara von Mühlen

== Bibliography ==
- John T. Soister. Conrad Veidt on Screen: A Comprehensive Illustrated Filmography. McFarland, 2002.
