= Gretchen Schubert =

1926 film directed by Karl Moos

- Directed by: Karl Moos
- Written by: F. Ladewig
- Produced by: Ludwig Czerny
- Cinematography: Willy Großstück
- Production company: Noto-Film
- Distributed by: Noto-Film
- Release date: 11 February 1926
- Country: Germany
- Languages: Silent; German intertitles

Gretchen Schubert is a 1926 German silent film directed by Karl Moos.

The film's sets were designed by the art directors Robert Neppach and Bernhard Schwidewski

== Cast ==
In alphabetical order

- Ruth Beyer
- Ines Decastro
- Wilhelm Diegelmann
- Hermann Picha
- Erich Poremski
- Lydia von Rodenberg
- Max Willenz

== Bibliography ==
- Claus Tieber & Anna Katharina Windisch. The Sounds of Silent Films: New Perspectives on History, Theory and Practice. Palgrave Macmillan, 2014.
