= The Prince and the Maid =

1924 film directed by Ludwig Czerny

- Directed by: Ludwig Czerny
- Written by: Otto Sprinzel; O.E. Witte
- Produced by: Ludwig Czerny; Otto Springefeld
- Starring: Ada Svedin; Charles Willy Kayser; Emil Stammer
- Cinematography: Emil Schünemann
- Music by: Richard Schönian
- Production company: Noto-Film
- Distributed by: Noto-Film; Gaumont British Distributors (UK)
- Release date: 14 November 1924
- Country: Germany
- Languages: Silent; German intertitles

The Prince and the Maid (German: Das Mädel von Pontecuculi) is a 1924 German silent film directed by Ludwig Czerny and starring Ada Svedin, Charles Willy Kayser and Emil Stammer.

The film's sets were designed by the art director Fritz Willi Krohn.

== Cast ==
- Ada Svedin as Pipsi, Tochter des Bürgermeisters
- Charles Willy Kayser as Carlo XVII., Fürst von Ponteredo / Octav d'Olbert
- Emil Stammer as Nicodemus Carnero, Bürgermeister von Pontecuculi
- Hermann Böttcher as Graf Dodo Caramba Formanoli, Hofmarschall
- Ellen Isenta as Innozencia Primarose, Schauspielerin
- Rudi Oehler as Bonaventura Baldrian, Komiker

== Bibliography ==
- Alfred Krautz. International directory of cinematographers, set- and costume designers in film, Volume 4. Saur, 1984.
