= Ada Svedin =

German actress (1900–1975)

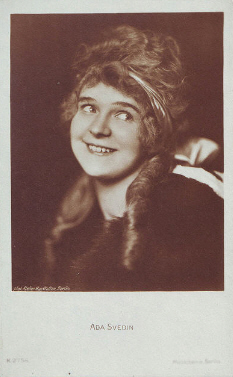
- Svedin c. 1920
- Born: Hildegard Adelaide Edelgunde Kommnick; 2 January 1900; Berlin, German Empire
- Died: 10 July 1975 (aged 75); West Berlin, West Germany
- Occupation: Actress
- Years active: 1918–1924 (film)
- Spouse: Ludwig Czerny (divorced)

Ada Svedin (born Hildegard Adelaide Edelgunde Kommnick; 2 January 1900 – 10 July 1975) was a German stage and film actress. She was married to director Ludwig Czerny.

== Selected filmography ==
- Miss Venus (1921)
- The Blonde Geisha (1923)
- The Prince and the Maid (1924)

== Bibliography ==
- Ken Wlaschin. The Silent Cinema in Song, 1896-1929: An Illustrated History and Catalog of Songs Inspired by the Movies and Stars, with a List of Recordings. McFarland & Company, 2009; ISBN 0786438045, ISBN 9780786438044
