= Karl Heiland =

German filmmaker (1876–1932)

- Born: 10 July 1876; Düsseldorf, German Empire
- Died: 10 October 1932 (aged 56); Berlin, Germany
- Other name: Heinz Karl Heiland
- Occupations: Writer, Producer, Director
- Years active: 1912–1926 (film)

Karl Heiland (1876 – 1932) was a German screenwriter, film producer and director of the silent era.

== Selected filmography ==
- The Spy (1917)
- Treasure of the Aztecs (1921)
- The White Geisha (1926)

== Bibliography ==
- John T. Soister. Conrad Veidt on Screen: A Comprehensive Illustrated Filmography. McFarland, 2002.
