= Hans Dreier =

German art director

- Born: August 21, 1885; Bremen, Germany
- Died: October 24, 1966 (aged 81); Bernardsville, New Jersey, United States
- Occupation: Art director
- Years active: 1919-1951

Hans Dreier (August 21, 1885 – October 24, 1966) was a German motion picture art director. He was Paramount Pictures' supervising art director from 1927 until his retirement in 1950, when he was succeeded by Hal Pereira.

Hans Dreier was born in Bremen, Germany in 1885. After studying architecture in Munich, Germany, Dreier worked as imperial supervising architect of the German Cameroon. During World War I, he served in the German Lancers.

He began his career in German films in 1919 as an assistant designer at UFA Studios. At the urging of German director Ernst Lubitsch, Dreier relocated to Hollywood in 1923 to work for Paramount. His first Hollywood film was Forbidden Paradise, directed by Lubitsch and starring Pola Negri. Dreier worked as Paramount's supervising art director from 1927 until his retirement in 1950.

He made contributions to nearly 500 films during his career, including many films directed by Josef von Sternberg and Ernst Lubitsch, as well as the film It's a Gift (1934) starring W. C. Fields. He was nominated for Academy Awards for his art direction on 23 occasions. He won Academy Awards for Best Art Direction (Color) for Frenchman's Creek (1944) and Samson and Delilah (1950). He also won the award for Art Direction (Black and White) for Sunset Boulevard (1950).

== Selected filmography ==
- The Devil and the Madonna (1919)
- Figures of the Night (1920)
- Mary Magdalene (1920)
- Napoleon and the Little Washerwoman (1920)
- Kurfürstendamm (1920)
- Lady Godiva (1921)
- The Riddle of the Sphinx (1921)
- The Adventuress of Monte Carlo (1921)
- The Last Witness (1921)
- Fridericus Rex (1922)
- The Vice of Gambling (1923)
- La Boheme (1923)
- The Great Unknown (1924)
- Forbidden Paradise (1924, art director)
- Underworld (1927, set design)
- The Docks of New York (1928)
- The Last Command (1928)
- The Patriot (1928) (Oscar nominee)
- Morocco (1930) (Oscar nominee)
- The Love Parade (1930) (Oscar nominee)
- The Vagabond King (1930) (Oscar nominee)
- A Farewell to Arms (1932) (Oscar nominee)
- One Hour with You (1932)
- Trouble in Paradise (1932)
- Shanghai Express (1932)
- Cleopatra (1934)
- The Lives of a Bengal Lancer (1935) (Oscar nominee)
- If I Were King (1938) (Oscar nominee)
- Arise, My Love (1940) (Oscar nominee)
- North West Mounted Police (1940) (Oscar nominee)
- The Lady Eve (1941)
- Holiday Inn (1942, art director with Roland Anderson)
- Road to Morocco (1942)
- Take a Letter, Darling (1942) (Oscar nominee)
- Five Graves to Cairo (1943) (Oscar nominee)
- For Whom the Bell Tolls (1943) (Oscar nominee)
- Double Indemnity (1944, art director with Hal Pereira)
- Going My Way (1944)
- Frenchman's Creek (1944, art director with Ernst Fegte) (Oscar winner)
- Kitty (1945) (Oscar nominee)
- The Lost Weekend (1945, art director with Ted Hedrick)
- Love Letters (1945) (Oscar nominee)
- A Foreign Affair (1948)
- Samson and Delilah (1950, art director with Walter Tyler) (Oscar winner)
- Sunset Boulevard (1950, art director with John Meehan) (Oscar winner)
- A Place in the Sun (1951)

== See also ==
- Art Directors Guild Hall of Fame
- List of German-speaking Academy Award winners and nominees
