= Conrad Veidt =

German and British actor (1893–1943)

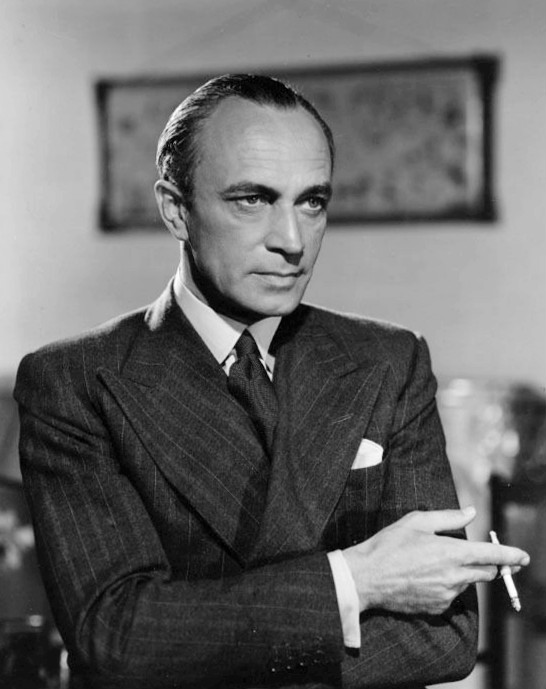
- Veidt in 1941
- Born: Hans Walter Conrad Veidt; 22 January 1893; Berlin, German Empire
- Died: 3 April 1943 (aged 50); Los Angeles, California, US
- Resting place: Golders Green Crematorium, London, England
- Citizenship: Germany (until 1939); UK (from 1939)
- Occupation: Actor
- Years active: 1913–1943
- Spouses: Gussy Holl (m. 1918; div. 1922) Felizitas Radke (m. 1923; div. 1932) Flora Ilona Barta "Lilli" Prager (m. 1933)
- Children: 1

Signature
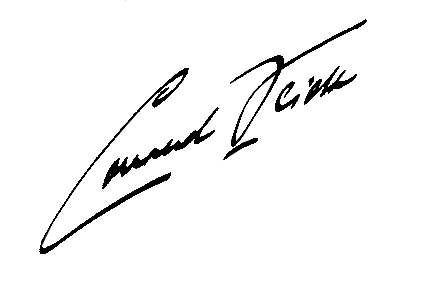

Hans Walter Conrad Veidt (/faɪt/ FYTE, German: [ˈkɔnʁaːt ˈfaɪt]; 22 January 1893 – 3 April 1943) was a German and British character actor. He attracted early attention for his roles in the films Different from the Others (1919), The Cabinet of Dr. Caligari (1920), and The Man Who Laughs (1928). After a successful career in German silent films, where he was one of the best-paid stars of UFA, Veidt and his new Jewish wife Ilona Prager left Germany in 1933 after the Nazis came to power. The couple settled in Britain, where he became a British subject in 1939. Veidt subsequently appeared in many British films, including The Thief of Bagdad (1940). After emigrating to the United States around 1941, he was cast as Major Strasser in Casablanca (1942), his last film role to be released during his lifetime.

== Early life ==
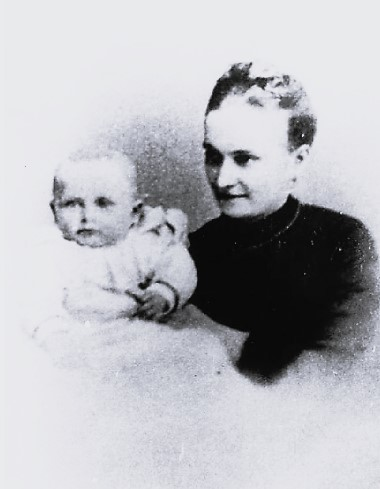
Conrad Veidt with his mother Amalie, 1893

Hans Walter Conrad Veidt was born on 22 January 1893 in his parents' home at Tieckstraße 39 in Berlin to Amalie Marie (née Gohtz) and Philipp Heinrich Veidt, a former military man turned civil servant. Veidt would later recall, "Like many fathers, he was affectionately autocratic in his home life, strict, idealistic. He was almost fanatically conservative." By contrast, Amalie was sensitive and nurturing. Veidt was nicknamed "Connie", also spelled "Conny", by his family and friends. His family was Lutheran, and Veidt was baptized on 26 March 1893. He was later confirmed in a ceremony at the Protestant Evangelical Church in Alt-Schöneberg, Berlin, on 5 March 1908. Veidt's only sibling, an older brother named Karl, died in 1900 of scarlet fever at the age of 9. The family spent their summers in Potsdam.

Two years after Karl's death, Veidt's father fell ill and required heart surgery. Knowing that the family could not afford to pay the lofty fee that accompanied the surgery, the doctor charged only what the family could comfortably pay. Impressed by the surgeon's skill and kindness, Veidt vowed to "model my life on the man that saved my father's life" and he wished to become a surgeon. His hopes for a medical career were thwarted, though, when, in 1912, he graduated without a diploma and ranked 13th out of 13 pupils and became discouraged over the amount of study necessary for him to qualify for medical school.

A new career path for Veidt opened up in 1911 during a school Christmas play in which he delivered a long prologue before the curtain rose. The play was badly received, and the audience was heard to mutter, "Too bad the others didn't do as well as Veidt."

With the money he raised from odd jobs and the allowance his mother gave him, Veidt began attending Berlin's many theatres. He stood outside of the Deutsches Theater after every performance, waiting for the actors and hoping to be mistaken for one. In the late summer of 1912 he met a theatre porter who introduced him to actor Albert Blumenreich, who agreed to give Veidt acting lessons for six marks. He took 10 lessons before auditioning for Max Reinhardt, reciting Goethe's Faust. During Veidt's audition, Reinhardt looked out of the window the entire time. He offered Veidt a contract as an extra for one season's work, from September 1913 to August 1914 with a pay of 50 marks a month. During this time, he played bit parts as spear carriers and soldiers. His mother attended almost every performance. His contract with the Deutsches Theater was renewed for a second season, but by this time World War I had begun, and on 28 December 1914, Veidt enlisted in the Imperial German Army.

In 1915, he was sent to the Eastern Front as a non-commissioned officer and took part in the Battle of Warsaw. He contracted jaundice and pneumonia, and had to be evacuated to a hospital on the Baltic Sea. While recuperating, he received a letter from his girlfriend Lucie Mannheim, telling him that she had found work at the Front Theatre in Libau.

Intrigued, Veidt applied for the theatre as well. As his condition had not improved, the army allowed him to join the theatre so that he could entertain the troops. While performing at the theatre, his relationship with Mannheim ended. In late 1916, he was re-examined by the Army and deemed unfit for service; he was given a full discharge on 10 January 1917. Veidt returned to Berlin where he was readmitted to the Deutsches Theater. There, he played a small part as a priest that got him his first rave review, the reviewer hoping that "God would keep Veidt from the films" or "God save him from the cinema!"

== Career ==
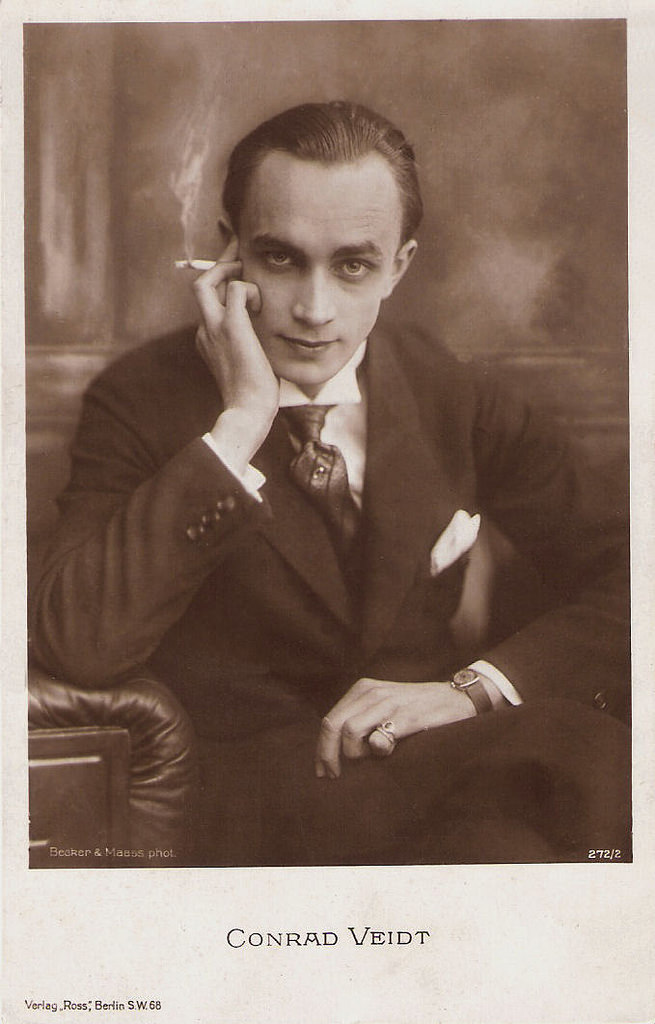
Veidt c. 1922

From 1917 until his death, Veidt appeared in more than 100 films. One of his earliest performances was as the murderous somnambulist Cesare in director Robert Wiene's The Cabinet of Dr. Caligari (1920), a classic of German Expressionist cinema, with Werner Krauss and Lil Dagover. His starring role in The Man Who Laughs (1928), as a disfigured young outcast servant whose face is cut into a permanent grin, provided the (visual) inspiration for the iconic Batman villain the Joker. Veidt starred in other silent horror films such as The Hands of Orlac (1924), also directed by Robert Wiene, The Student of Prague (1926) and Waxworks (1924), in which he played Ivan the Terrible. Veidt also appeared in Magnus Hirschfeld's film Anders als die Andern (Different from the Others, 1919), one of the earliest films to sympathetically portray homosexuality, although the characters in it do not end up happily. He had a leading role in Germany's first talking picture, Das Land ohne Frauen (Land Without Women, 1929).

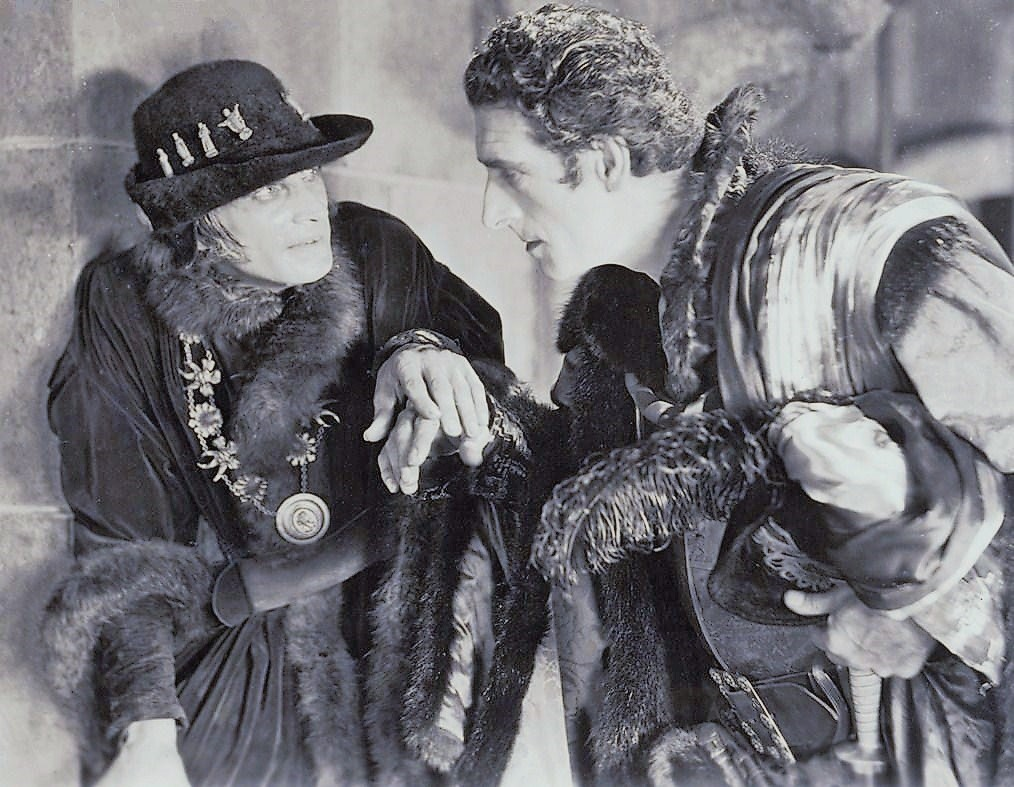
Conrad Veidt (left) and Lawson Butt in The Beloved Rogue (1927)

He moved to Hollywood in the late 1920s and made a few films there, but the advent of talking pictures and his difficulty with speaking English led him to return to Germany. During this period, he lent his expertise to tutoring aspiring performers, one of whom was future American character actress Lisa Golm.

== Emigration ==
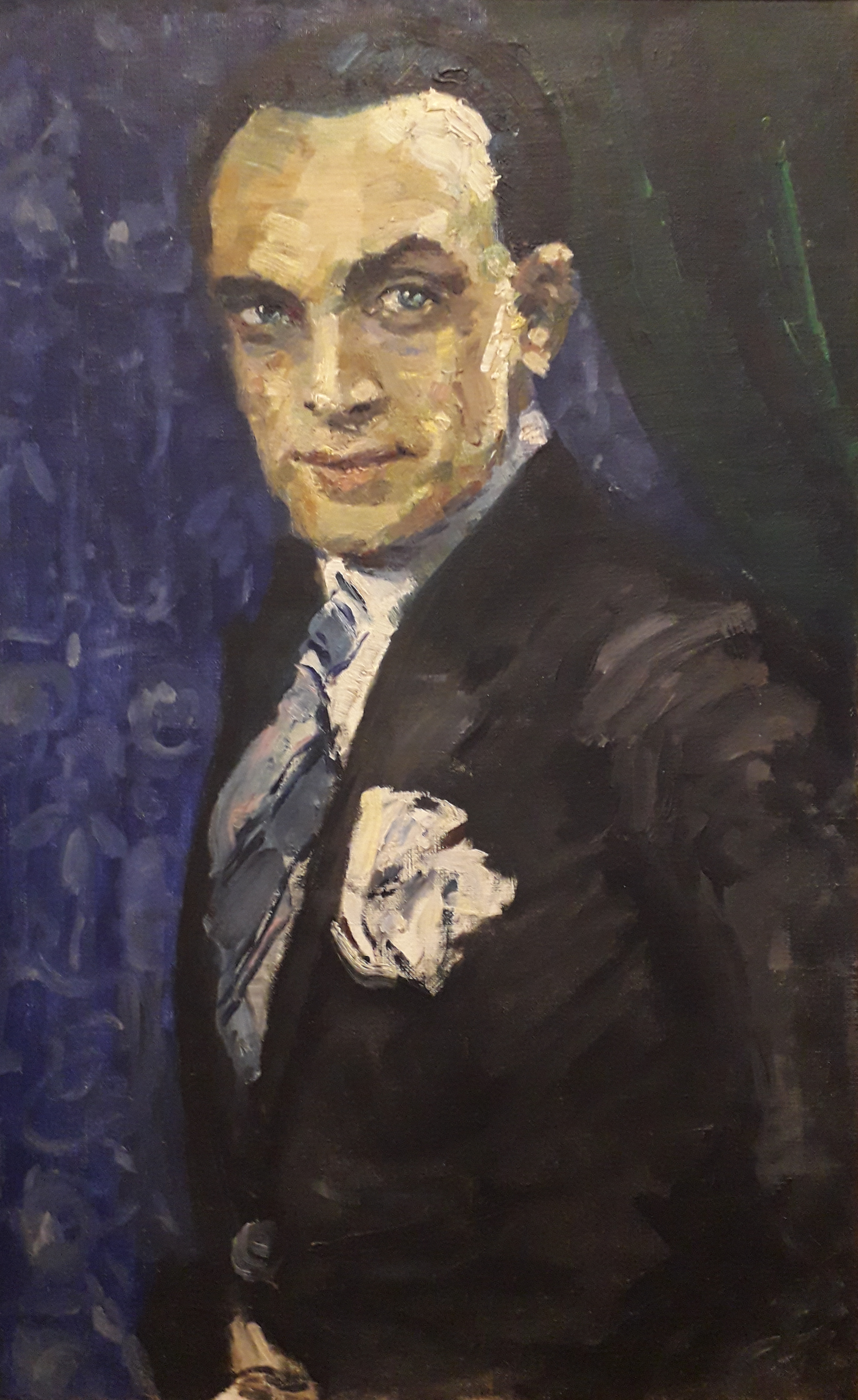
Portrait of Conrad Veidt by Milena Pavlović-Barili

Veidt opposed the Nazi regime and later contributed funds for the relief of Britons during the German Blitz bombings. Soon after the Nazi Party took power in Germany, by March 1933, Joseph Goebbels was purging the film industry of political opponents and Jews. In April 1933, a week after Veidt's marriage to Flora Ilona Barta Prager, a Jewish woman, also known as "Lilli" or "Lily", the couple emigrated to Britain before any action could be taken against either of them.

Goebbels had imposed a "racial questionnaire" in which everyone employed in the German film industry had to declare their "race" to continue to work. When Veidt was filling in the questionnaire, he answered the question about his Rasse (race) by writing Jude (Jew). Veidt was not Jewish, but his wife was, and Veidt would neither renounce the woman he loved nor collaborate with the regime as many others did.

Veidt was opposed to antisemitism and showed solidarity with the German Jewish community, who were being stripped of their rights as German citizens in the spring of 1933. Veidt had been informed that if he divorced and declared support for the new regime, he could continue to act in Germany. Several other leading actors unsympathetic to the Nazis before 1933 switched allegiances. In answering the questionnaire by stating he was a Jew, Veidt rendered himself unemployable in Germany, but stated this sacrifice was worth it as there was nothing in the world that would compel him to break with his wife.

Goebbels remarked that he would never act in Germany again. He was put under house arrest on Goebbels' orders after he voiced his wishes to act in the British film Jew Süss. Only after a diplomatic intervention on the part of the British government was he allowed to leave. The German newspaper Völkischer Beobachter wrote on this in 1933 that "It is known that the Jewish film production in England produced two coarse, sensational films for purposes of Jewish propaganda: the film Wandering Jew and a second film - Jud Süss. [...] Conrad Veidt plays leading roles in both. [...] Conrad Veidt was paid for this betrayal of his country – by the praise of the Jewish public. As such, he no longer possesses enough human dignity that even one single person should utter a word of praise for him."

Conrad Veidt in The Spy in Black (1939)

After arriving in Britain, Veidt improved his English and starred in the original anti-Nazi versions of The Wandering Jew (1933) and Jew Süss (1934). The latter film was directed by the exiled German-born director Lothar Mendes and produced by Michael Balcon for Gaumont-British. He naturalised as a British subject on 25 February 1939. By this point multi-lingual, Veidt made films both in French with expatriate French directors and in English, including three of his best-known roles for British director Michael Powell in The Spy in Black (1939), Contraband (1940) and The Thief of Bagdad (1940).

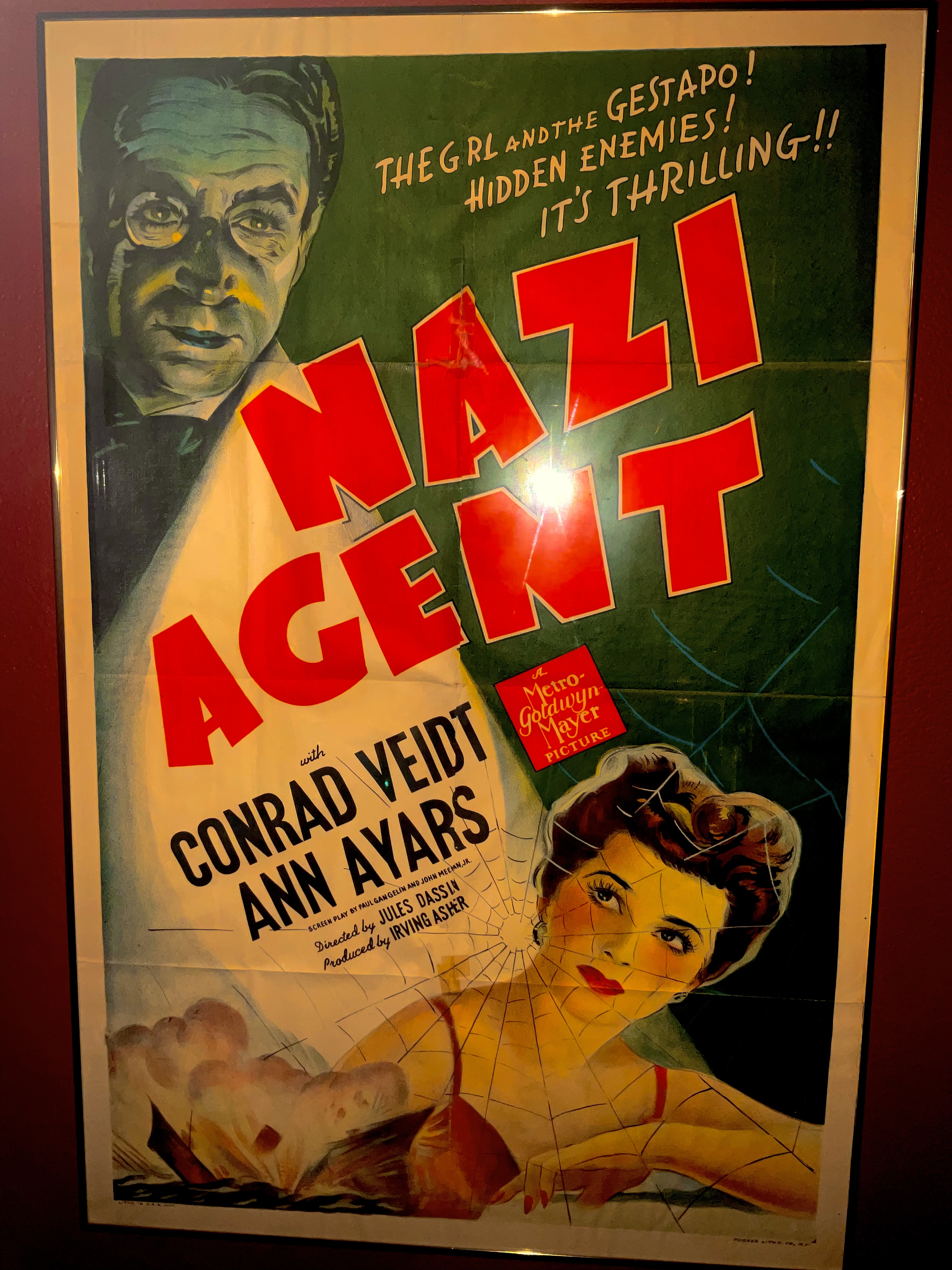
Nazi Agent (1942) lobby poster

=== Later career in the US ===
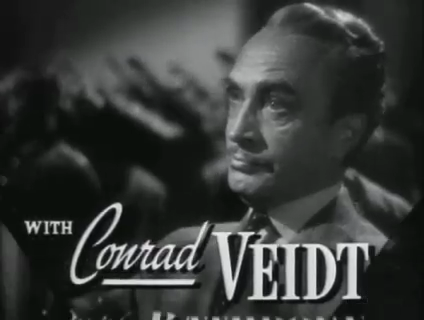
Veidt in Above Suspicion (1943), his final film role

By 1941, he and Lilli had settled in Hollywood to assist the British war effort by making American films that might persuade the then-neutral and still isolationist United States to join the war against the Nazis, who at that time controlled all of continental Europe and were bombing the United Kingdom. Before leaving the UK, the Veidts gave a large portion of their life savings to the British government to help finance the war effort, and then provided an American home for an English child for the duration of the war.

He starred in a few films, such as George Cukor's A Woman's Face (1941), where he received billing under Joan Crawford, and Nazi Agent (1942), in which he had a dual role as both an aristocratic German Nazi spy and the man's twin brother, an anti-Nazi American. His best-known Hollywood role was as the sinister Major Heinrich Strasser in Casablanca (1942), a film which began pre-production before the United States entered World War II. Commenting about this well-received role, Veidt noted that it was an ironical twist of fate that he was praised "for portraying the kind of character who had forced him to leave his homeland".

Ivan J. Rado, the nephew of Lilli Prager, commented:

The fact that he wanted to leave Hollywood had nothing to do with anything but his disgust at the parts offered him, which was [sic] mainly Nazis. In Above Suspicion, he is at some rally, and when at the end everyone goes "Heil", he just very casually half lifts his right hand, more in a wave than a salute, and with an ironic smile on his face, which to me, embodies his feelings. ... The fact that he left Germany ... was his disgust at what was happening that made him move to London with Lily.

=== Marriages ===
==== Gussy Holl ====
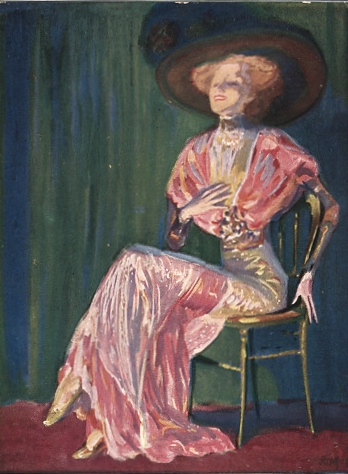
Portrait of Gussy Holl by Paul Rieth, c. 1918

On 10 June 1918, Veidt married Gussy Holl, a cabaret entertainer. They had first met at a party in March 1918, and Conrad described her to friends as "very lovely, tall, dignified and somewhat aloof". They separated in 1919 but attempted to reconcile multiple times. Holl and Veidt divorced in 1922.

Veidt said of Holl, "She was as perfect as any wife could be. But I had not learnt how to be a proper husband," and "I was elated by my success in my work, but shattered over my mother's death, and miserable about the way my marriage seemed to be foundering. And one day when my wife was away, I walked out of the house, and out of her life, trying to escape from something I could put no name to." Holl later told Françoise Rosay, "I excused a lot of his failings and whims because I loved him. But one day he did something to me that I couldn't forgive. I was singing that evening at the cabaret. I left him home and he told me: 'I invited a few friends; we'll dine while we wait for you.' And it just so happened I had received a new dress from Paris. That evening, after work, I arrived home and what do I see? All these gentlemen dressed as women. And Conrad had put on my Paris dress. At this point, I divorced!"

==== Felizitas Radke ====
Veidt's second wife, Anna Maria "Felizitas" Radke, was from an aristocratic Austrian family. They met at a party in December 1922 or at a Charleston dance competition in 1923. Radke divorced her husband for him, and they married on 18 April 1923. Their daughter, Vera Viola Maria, nicknamed "Kiki" and also known as "Viola", was born on 10 August 1925. Conrad was not present at her birth due to being in Italy working on The Fiddler of Florence, but took the first train to Berlin and wept as he met mother and child at the hospital; he was so hysterical from joy they had to sedate him and keep him in the hospital overnight.

Emil Jannings was Viola's godfather and Elisabeth Bergner was her godmother. She was named after one of Bergner's signature characters, Shakespeare's Viola. The birth of his daughter helped Veidt move on from the death of his mother, who had died of a heart condition in January 1922.

From September 1926 to 1929 Veidt lived with his wife and daughter in a Spanish-style house in Beverly Hills. He enjoyed relaxing and playing with his daughter in their home, and enjoyed the company of the immigrant community, including F. W. Murnau, Carl Laemmle, and Greta Garbo, as well as the American Gary Cooper. The family returned to Germany in 1929, and moved several times afterwards, including a temporary relocation to Vienna, Austria, while Veidt participated in a theatrical tour of the continent.

Radke and Veidt divorced in 1932, with Radke saying the frequent relocations and the separations necessitated by Veidt's acting schedule frayed their marriage. Radke at first granted custody of their daughter to Veidt, but after further consideration he decided that their daughter needed the full-time parent. Conrad received generous visitation rights, and Viola called her summer vacations with her father "The Happy Times". She stayed with him three or four months of the year until the outbreak of World War II. Viola died on 2 February 2004 in New Orleans, Louisiana, aged 78.

==== Lilli Prager ====
The last woman Veidt married was Flora Ilona Barta Prager, a Hungarian Jew also known as "Lilli" or "Lily", in Berlin 24 March 1933. They remained together until his death. The two had met at a club in Berlin.

Veidt said of Lilli in an October 1934 interview with The Sunday Dispatch,

Lilli was the woman I had been seeking all my life. For her I was the man. In Lilli I found the miracle of a woman who had all to give that I sought, the perfect crystallisation in one lovely human being, of all my years of searching. Lilli had the mother complex too. But in the reverse ratio to mine. In her, the mother instinct was so powerful that she poured it out, indiscriminately almost, on everyone she knew. She mothers her own mother. Meeting Lilli was like coming home to an enchanted place one had always dreamed of, but never thought to reach. For her it was the same. Our marriage is not only flawless, it is a complete and logical union, as inevitable as daybreak after night, as harmonious and right as the words that exactly fit the music. My search is finished. The picture in my mind of my mother is of a woman great and holy. But it is a picture clear and distinct, a deep and humble memory of a woman no one could replace; but now it is not blurred by the complex which before had harassed my mind.

Veidt and Lilli moved from London to Los Angeles, arriving on 13 June 1940. They resided at 617 North Camden Drive in Beverly Hills.

=== Wartime efforts ===
Even after leaving England, Veidt was concerned over the plight of children cooped up in London air raid shelters, and he decided to try to cheer up their holiday. Through his lawyers in London, Veidt donated enough money to purchase 2,000 one-pound tins of candy, 2,000 large packets of chocolate, and 1,000 wrapped envelopes containing presents of British currency. The gifts went to children of needy families in various air raid shelters in the London area during Christmas 1940. The air raid shelter marshal wrote back to Veidt thanking him for the gifts. Noting Veidt's unusual kindness, he stated in his letter to him, "It is significant to note that, as far as is known to me, you are the only member of the Theatrical Profession who had the thought to send Christmas presents to the London children."

Veidt smuggled his parents-in-law from Austria to neutral Switzerland, and in 1935 he managed to get the Nazi government to let his ex-wife Radke and their daughter move to Switzerland. He also offered to help Felizitas' mother, Frau Radke, of whom he was fond, leave Germany. However, she declined. A proud, strong-willed woman who was attached to her home country, she declared that "no damned little Austrian Nazi corporal" was going to make her leave her home. She reportedly survived the war, but none of the Veidts ever saw her again.

=== Sexuality ===
Veidt was possibly bisexual. During his youthful career in the more liberal Weimar Republic cabaret-era he was part of the avant-garde, experimental artists' lifestyle, including cross-dressing.

Rado, while having a family interest, commented with insights consistent with the record available:

... there are a few facts that I would like to share with everyone interested.

Aside from his work, which was also his life, there is little to know about Conny; he was an intensely private man who loved his home and his friends, but did not carouse in public nor was prey to scandalous behavior.

In his work, he was intense and generous, the consummate professional. ...

Early on he saw what was happening in Germany, and moved to London, where he did some important work in movies. He was not a political person, and was certainly not to be caught out on religious themes. The fact that his wife was Jewish meant nothing to him; they loved each other and loved being together. He was always honest, totally straight forward and kind.

Shirley Conway, in her 1993 Retrospektive, also comments, consistent with other reports of the man being somewhat different from the screen image, that "Veidt surprised and delighted everyone with his modesty and ineffable charm."

He showed fondness and respect for women. In a 1941 interview he said,

There are two different kinds of men. There are the men men, what do you call them, the man's man, who likes men around, who prefers to talk with men, who says the female can never be impersonal, who takes the female lightly, as playthings. I do not see a man like that in my mirror. Perhaps, it is because I think the female and the male attract better than two men, that I prefer to talk with females. I do. I find it quite as stimulating and distinctly more comfortable. I have a theory about this – it all goes back to the mother complex. In every woman, the man who looks may find – his mother. The primary source of all his comfort. I think also that females have become too important just to play with. When men say the female cannot discuss impersonally, that is no longer so. When it is said that females cannot be geniuses, that is no longer so, either. The female is different from the male. Because she was born to be a mother. There is no doubt about that. But that does not mean that, in some cases, she is not also born a genius. Not all males are geniuses either. And among females today there are some very fine actresses, very fine; fine doctors, lawyers, even scientists and industrialists. I see no fault in any female when she wears slacks, smokes (unless it is on the street, one thing, the only thing, which I don't like), when she drives a car ... when men say things like "I bet it is a woman driving" if something is wrong with the car ahead – no, no. These are old, worn out prejudices, they do not belong in today.

== Death and legacy ==
In the 1930s, Veidt learned that he had the same heart condition which had killed his mother. It was aggravated by his chain smoking, and Veidt took nitroglycerin tablets. He died of a heart attack on 3 April 1943 while playing golf at the Riviera Country Club in Los Angeles with singer Arthur Fields and his personal physician.

The Conrad Veidt Society (CVS) was formed in 1990 to commemorate his 1993 centennial of birth and then to find a final home for the Veidt ashes, which Lily Veidt's nephew Ivan Rado had given to the society's founder James H. Rathlesberger along with Veidt family papers and memorabilia. An earlier German-based Conrad Veidt Society had become inactive some years before the US-based society began. The CVS motto "Courage Integrity Humanity" honored qualities the legendary film star exemplified while claiming to be "only an actor".

CVS supported 1993 retrospectives at the Internationale Filmfestspiele in Berlin, La Cinematheque Francaise in Paris, the Goethe Institute and British Film Institute's National Film Theatre in London, the Museum of Modern Art in New York, as well as the Gay Museum in Berlin. CVS donated most of the Veidt materials to the University of California's Berkeley Art Museum and Pacific Film Archive. Among its efforts was a 650 Deutschmark/$450 contribution to the Stiftung Deutsche Kinemathek as seed money for SDK's Homage to Conrad Veidt film series held during the 1993 Berlin International Film Festival.

Two Veidt scrapbooks, his monogrammed silver cigarette case and gold Dunhill lighter went to the Margaret Herrick Library, Center for Motion Picture Study, Academy of Motion Picture Arts and Sciences. Film, video and audio mix from a short film entitled "Conny" that Rado produced using memorabilia inherited from Lily was donated to the University of Southern California Max Kade Institute and UCLA Film & Television Archive. The PFA in Berkeley has a VHS tape of the film, as does the Max Kade Institute and the Ayn Rand Institute.

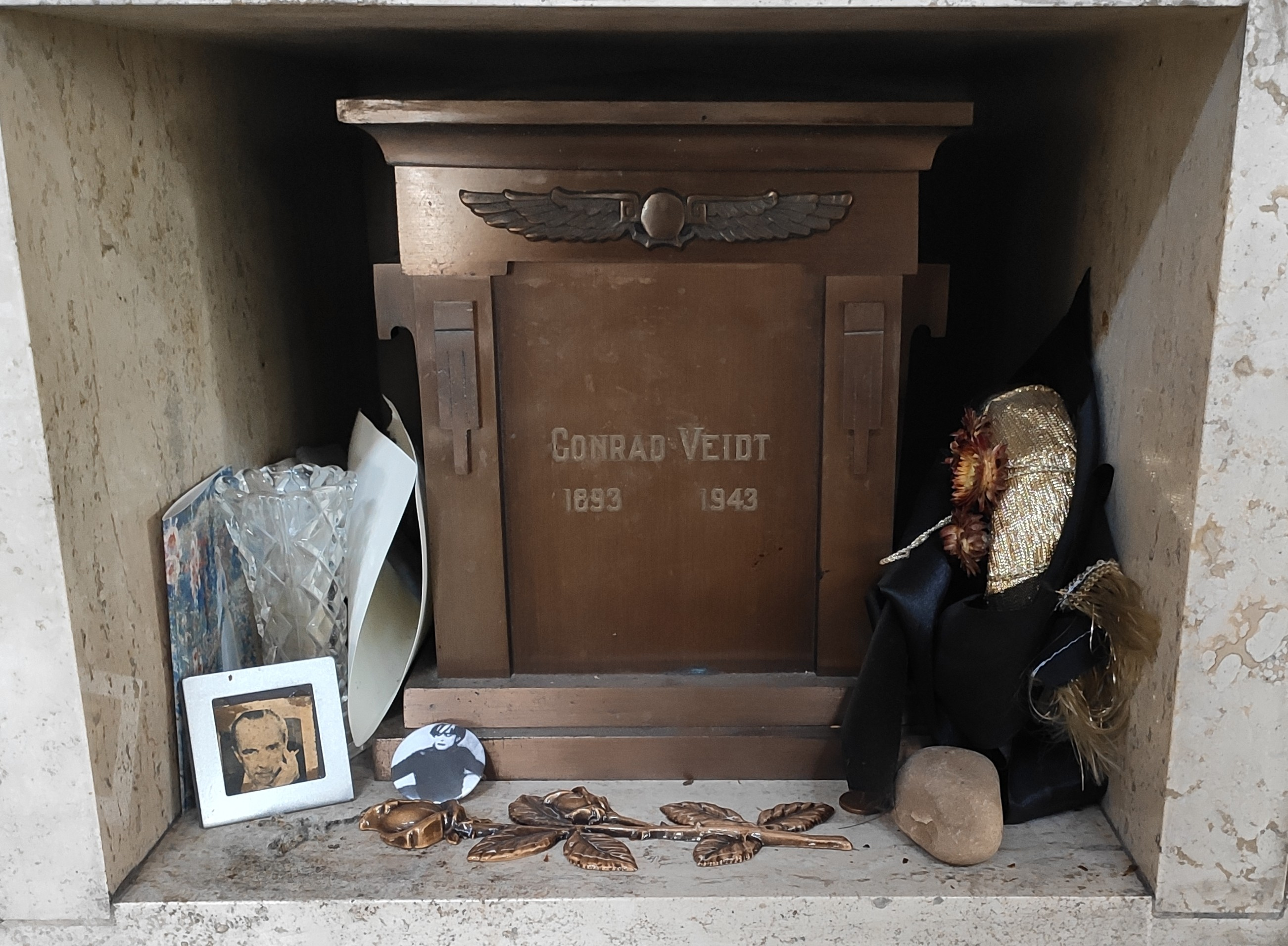
Urn with Veidt's ashes at Golders Green Crematorium

CVS reached out to German film officials who wished to receive the Veidt ashes but hesitated to act following controversies surrounding similar honors for Marlene Dietrich. After efforts stalled to take the Veidt ashes to Berlin, CVS raised funds for interment at Golders Green, close to where the Veidts had lived in London. Londoner Vivienne Phillips was instrumental in arranging this. On 3 April 1998, on the 55th anniversary of his passing, Veidt's ashes, mixed in the original urn with those of his wife Lilli, were placed in a niche of the columbarium at the Golders Green Crematorium in north London. The ceremony drew attendees from two continents and was broadcast by BBC Radio 4.

== Complete filmography ==
Year	Title	Role	Notes
1917	The Path of Death	Rolf	Filmed in late 1916, Veidt's screen debut Lost film
1917	Let There Be Light	Herr Kramer	The film had four parts which premiered throughout 1917 to 1918. Lost film
1917	When the Dead Speak	Richard von Worth	Lost film
1917	Fear	Indian Priest	Print exists at the Swedish Film Institute
1917	The Spy	Steinau	Lost film
1918	The Mystery of Bangalore	Dinja	Lost film
1918	The Mexican		Lost film
1918	The House of Three Girls	Baron Schober	Lost film
1918	Diary of a Lost Woman	Dr. Julius	Lost film
1918	Jettchen Gebert's Story	Doctor Friedrich Köstling	Lost film
1918	Colomba	Henrik van Rhyn	Lost film
1918	The Story of Dida Ibsen	Erik Norrensen	Print exists at the George Eastman House
1918	Henriette Jacoby	Doctor Friedrich Köstling	Lost film
1918	Victim of Society	Prosecutor Chrysander	Lost film
1918	Not of the Woman Born	Satan	Lost film
1919	Opium	Dr. Richard Armstrong Jr.	Print survives at the Century Guild archive
1919	Nocturne of Love	Frederic Chopin	Lost film
1919	The Japanese Woman	The Secretary	Lost film
1919	Prostitution (2 parts)	Alfred Werner	Lost film
1919	Around the World in Eighty Days	Phileas Fogg	This film exists in the Archiv Filmkunde Paul Sauerlaender
1919	Peer Gynt (2 parts)	Strange Passenger	Lost film
1919	Different from the Others	Paul Körner	Restored version of the film exists
1919	The Ocarina	Jaap	Lost film
1919	Prince Cuckoo	Karl Kraker	Lost film
1919	Madness	Bankier Lorenzen	Veidt's directorial debut Lost film
1919	Eerie Tales	Death (framing story) / The stranger (ep.1) / The assassin (ep.2) / Traveller (ep.3) / Club president (ep.4) / Husband (ep.5)	Original negative is lost, but a restored version of the film exists
1920	The Count of Cagliostro	The Minister	Lost film
1920	Figures of the Night	Clown	Lost film
1920	Satan	Lucifer / Hermit / Gubetta / Grodski	Lost film
1920	The Cabinet of Dr. Caligari	Cesare	
1920	The Merry-Go-Round	Petre Karvan	
1920	Patience	Sir Percy Parker	Lost film
1920	The Night at Goldenhall	Lord Reginald Golden / Harald Golden	Directed by Veidt; Lost film
1920	The Eyes of the World	Johannes Kay, Julianne's Lover	Lost film
1920	Temperamental Artist	Arpad Czaslo	
1920	Kurfürstendamm	Satan	Lost film
1920	Der Januskopf	Dr. Warren / Mr. O'Connor	Lost film
1920	Moriturus	Wilmos	Lost film
1920	The Clan		
1920	Evening – Night – Morning	Brilburn – Maud's brother	Lost film
1920	Manolescu's Memoirs	Manolescu	Lost film
1920-1921	Christian Wahnschaffe (2 parts)	Christian Wahnschaffe	Incomplete, Opening act does not survive but the remainder of the film was restored in 2018
1921	People in Ecstasy	Professor Munk	Lost film
1921	The Secret of Bombay	Dichter Tossi	
1921	Journey into the Night	The Painter	
1921	Love and Passion	Jalenko, the Gypsy	Lost film
1921	The Love Affairs of Hector Dalmore	Hektor Dalmore	Print exists at the Cinémathèque royale de Belgique
1921	Desire	Ivan – a young Russian dancer	Lost film
1921	Country Roads and the Big City	Raphael, der Geiger	Print exists at the Cinémathèque royale de Belgique
1921	Lady Hamilton	Lord Nelson	Copy exists in a Russian film archive
1921	The Indian Tomb (2 parts)	Maharajah of Bengal Ayan III / Prince of Eschnapur	
1921	The Passion of Inge Krafft	Hendryck Overland	
1922	Lucrezia Borgia	Cesare Borgia	
1923	Paganini	Niccolò Paganini	Lost film
1923	William Tell	Hermann Gessler	
1923	Gold and Luck	The Count	Lost film
1923	Bride of Vengeance	Cesare Borgia	Lost film
1924	Carlos and Elisabeth	Don Carlos	
1924	The Hands of Orlac	Paul Orlac	
1924	Waxworks	Ivan the Terrible	
1924	Husbands or Lovers	Der Liebhaber, ein Dichter	
1925	Count Kostia	Count Kostia	Lost film
1925	Love is Blind	Dr. Lamare	Lost film
1925	Destiny	Count L. M. Vranna	Lost film
1925	Ingmar's Inheritance	Hellgum	
1926	The Fiddler of Florence	Renées Vater	
1926	The Brothers Schellenberg	Wenzel Schellenberg / Michael Schellenberg	
1926	Should We Be Silent?	Paul Hartwig, Maler	Incomplete film, exists in fragmentary form
1926	The Woman's Crusade	Prosecutor	
1926	The Student of Prague	Balduin, a student	
1926	The Flight in the Night	Heinrich IV	
1927	The Beloved Rogue	King Louis XI	
1927	A Man's Past	Paul La Roche	Lost film
1928	The Man Who Laughs	Gwynplaine / Lord Clancharlie	
1929	Gesetze der Liebe		
1929	Land Without Women	Dick Ashton, telegrapher	Veidt's talkie debut Lost film
1929	The Last Performance	Erik the Great	Incomplete film Filmed and released in New York in 1927, exists but 10 minutes are missing
1930	The Last Company	Hauptmann Burk	
1930	Menschen im Käfig (People in the Cage)	Kingsley	Lost film
1930	The Great Longing	Himself	
1931	The Man Who Murdered	Marquis de Sévigné	
1931	The Night of Decision	General Gregori Platoff	Lost film
1931	The Other Side	Hauptmann Stanhope	Incomplete film, exists but 10 minutes are possibly missing
1932	Rasputin, Demon with Women	Grigori Rasputin	
1932	The Congress Dances	Prince Metternich	
1932	The Black Hussar	Rittmeister Hansgeorg von Hochberg	
1932	Rome Express	Zurta	
1933	The Empress and I	Marquis de Pontignac	
1933	F.P.1	Maj. Ellissen	
1933	I Was a Spy	Commandant Oberaertz	
1933	The Wandering Jew	Matathias	
1934	William Tell	Gessler (both German- and English-language versions)	
1934	Jew Süss	Josef Süss Oppenheimer	
1934	Bella Donna	Mahmoud Baroudi	
1935	The Passing of the Third Floor Back	The Stranger	
1935	King of the Damned	Convict 83	
1937	Dark Journey	Baron Karl Von Marwitz	
1937	Under the Red Robe	Gil de Berault	
1938	Storm Over Asia	Erich Keith	
1938	The Chess Player	Baron Kempelen	
1939	The Spy in Black	Captain Hardt	
1940	Contraband	Capt. Andersen	
1940	The Thief of Bagdad	Jaffar	
1940	Escape	General Kurt von Kolb	Won an NBR Award for Best Acting
1941	A Woman's Face	Torsten Barring	
1941	Whistling in the Dark	Joseph Jones	
1941	The Men in Her Life	Stanislas Rosing	
1942	All Through the Night	Ebbing	
1942	Nazi Agent	Otto Becker / Baron Hugo Von Detner	
1942	Casablanca	Major Heinrich Strasser	
1943	Above Suspicion	Hassert Seidel	Released posthumously
