= Rita Clermont =

German actress

- Born: Maria Juliane Forstner; 4 March 1894; Regensburg, German Empire
- Died: 6 December 1969 (aged 75); Munich, West Germany
- Occupation: Actress
- Years active: 1915–1924 (film)

Rita Clermont (4 March 1894 – December 6, 1969) was a German film actress of the silent era.

== Selected filmography ==
- The Uncanny House (1916)
- The Lord of Hohenstein (1917)
- Nocturne of Love (1919)
- Prostitution (1919)
- Deceiver of the People (1921)
- Dance of Passions (1922)
- Irene of Gold (1923)
- Maud Rockefeller's Bet (1924)

== Bibliography ==
- Grange, William (2008). Cultural Chronicle of the Weimar Republic. Lanham, MD: Scarecrow Press. ISBN 978-0-8108-5967-8.
