= Ludwig Czerny =

German film director and film producer

- Born: 24 June 1885; Belgrade, Serbia
- Died: 10 September 1941 (aged 56); Berlin, Nazi Germany
- Occupations: Producer, director, writer, technician
- Years active: 1916-1934 (film)
- Spouse(s): Martha Auguste Klara Müller; Ada Svedin

Ludwig Czerny (24 June 1885 – 10 September 1941) was a German technician, film producer and film director. As a technician he specialized in developing sound systems for performing silent film and later to post-synchronize sound films. He was married to the actress Ada Svedin.

== Biography ==
Czerny grew up in Vienna, where he attended elementary school, middle school and secondary school. Shortly after the turn of the century, he took acting lessons from actor Hermann Romany at the Vienna Theater School. Czerny began his artistic career at Theater an der Wien, his first engagement was in 1906 at the Innsbruck city theater. The following year he switched to the Carl Schultze Theater as a choir singer. In 1910 Czerny went on an opera and operetta tour to South America with an ensemble, where he also directed. The following year he was appointed director (under the direction of Felix Basch) to the Vienna Operetta Ensemble. Czerny already felt connected to music theater - an interest that was to lead to his cinematic work years later.

In 1919, he co-developed the NotoFilm system for adding sound to a film (also called Czerny-Springefeld method ). In the system sheet music was copied into part of a film image, which was to serve as a score for the conductor and orchestra present in a cinema theater. During the music passages, the conductor was able to direct the melody from the images of the notes running at the bottom of the picture; Singers in the hall tried to perform their arias on the screen in sync with the actors' lip movements. Despite the considerable effort, these films turned out to be technically poor and, moreover, quite unsuccessful. After the public and critic flop Das Mädel von Pontecuculi , film critic Robert Volz called the work premiered in November 1924 a "freak of this film operetta", the pioneer of this film genre completely withdrew from the directing business. After the singing film Gretchen Schubert , which was shot in 1925, failed in every respect, NotoFilm ceased production entirely.

With the beginning of the sound film era, Czerny returned to the film and tried again, without any real success, to run his own production company Czerny-Prod. GmbH as a film producer. He concentrated on documentaries about (north German) country and people. As early as 1934, after the completion of his only sound feature film (the boy's story Die Gange vom Hoheneck), the Nazis, who had come to power the year before, forced all production activities to cease. Czerny died during an air raid on 1941 when he tried to help a woman carry her stroller down to the air-raid shelter.

== Filmography ==
- Die Beichte einer Verurteilten (1915)
- Entführt (1915)
- Das goldene Match (1916)
- Sondis Kleine (1916)
- Lillis erste Liebe (1916)
- Lottes erste Liebe (1916)
- Die goldene Brücke (1917)
- Alfreds Techtelmechtel (1919)
- Der Glücksschmied (1919)
- Das Menuett (also production) (1919)
- Das Kussverbot (1920) (also screenplay)
- Miss Venus (1921)
- Jenseits des Stromes (1922)
- The Blonde Geisha (1923) (also screenplay)
- The Prince and the Maid (1924)
- Gretchen Schubert (1926)
- Buch und Mensch (1931)
- Im Teufelsmoor (1932)
- Heidehochzeit (1932)
- Eine Stadt ruft die Welt (1933)
- Ein glücklicher Vormittag (1933)
- Die Bande vom Hoheneck (1934)

== Bibliography ==
- Bock, Hans-Michael & Bergfelder, Tim. The Concise CineGraph. Encyclopedia of German Cinema. Berghahn Books, 2009; ISBN 978-1-57181-655-9
