= The Night at Goldenhall =

1920 film directed by Conrad Veidt

- Directed by: Conrad Veidt
- Written by: Hermann Fellner; Margarete Lindau-Schulz
- Produced by: Conrad Veidt; Richard Oswald
- Starring: Conrad Veidt; Gussy Holl; Heinrich Peer
- Cinematography: Karl Freund
- Production company: Conrad Veidt-Film
- Release date: 16 April 1920
- Running time: 1,808 meters; 1,700 meters after censorship.
- Country: Germany
- Languages: Silent; German intertitles

The Night at Goldenhall (German: Die Nacht auf Goldenhall) is a 1920 German silent film directed by and starring Conrad Veidt. It is now considered a lost film.

Following the death of Lord Reginald Golden, his nephew Harald Golden, who had previously been disinherited due to his dissolute lifestyle, returns to inherit the title and the Goldenhall estate. A few weeks later, Baron von Lehden, an old friend of Reginald’s, arrives at the castle accompanied by his daughter, Ellen. The Baron is astonished to learn that Reginald had allegedly committed suicide and that Harald, whom he believed to be in America is now at Goldenhall.

Tormented by remorse, Harald confesses the truth to Ellen. He had returned from America to reconcile with his uncle, but Reginald had rejected him. That night, Harald entered his uncle's bedroom and pleaded for forgiveness, threatening to take his own life if Reginald refused. During a struggle for the pistol, the weapon accidentally discharged, killing Reginald.

To cover up the incident, Harald staged the death as a suicide and forged his uncle's will, substituting his own name for that of Ellen, the rightful heir. However, after confessing his actions, Harald repents and restores everything to Ellen. He asks for her forgiveness and declares his love. Ellen agrees to reclaim the inheritance and ultimately consents to marry him as well.

The film premiered on April 16, 1920, with a length of 1,808 meters, but subsequent censorship cut the film to 1,770 meters.

The film's sets were designed by the art director Robert Neppach.

== Cast ==
- Conrad Veidt as Lord Reginald Golden / Harald Golden
- Gussy Holl as Ellen Lehden
- Esther Hagan as Rajah
- Heinrich Peer as Baron Lehden

== Bibliography ==
- John T. Soister. Conrad Veidt on Screen: A Comprehensive Illustrated Filmography. McFarland, 2002.
