= Danton's Death =

Drama by Georg Büchner

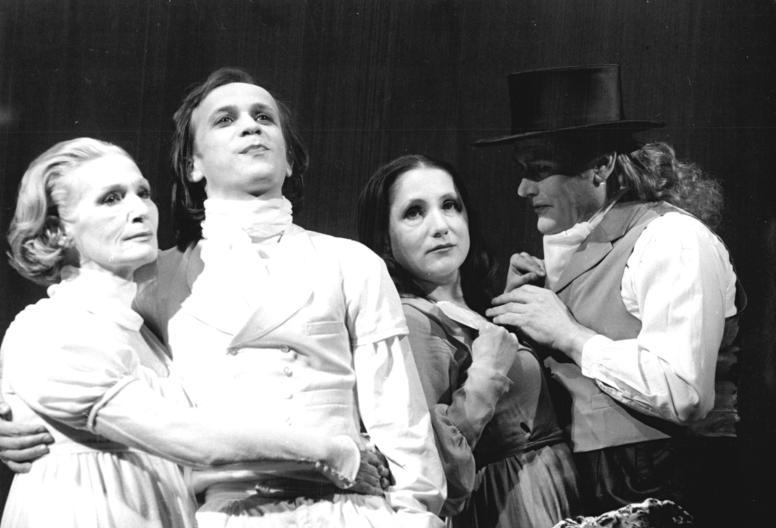
- 1981 Berlin production of Dantons Tod
- Original title: Dantons Tod
- Original language: German
- Written by: Georg Büchner
- Characters: Danton; Legendre; Lacroix; Camille Desmoulins; Hérault-Séchelles; Philippeau; Fabre d'Églantine; Mercier; Thomas Paine; Robespierre; St. Just; Barère; Collot d'Herbois; Billaud-Varenne; Chaumette; Dillon; Fouquier-Tinville; Amar; Voulland; Herman; Dumas; Julie; Lucile; Paris; Simon; Simon's Wife
- First publication: 1835
- Subject: French Revolution, Reign of Terror
- Genre: historical drama
- Setting: Paris, 24 March–5 April 1794

Premiere
- Date: 5 January 1902
- Place: Belle-Alliance-Theater, Berlin

Danton's Death (Dantons Tod) was the first play written by Georg Büchner, set during the French Revolution.

== History ==
Büchner was in constant fear of being arrested while writing Dantons Tod. It only reached print in 1835 after being heavily cut and having the politics softened by sexual innuendo. Research for the play started in late 1834 and he completed a first version of the complete script in five weeks from mid-January to mid-February 1835. The same year saw a version published by Karl Gutzkow in the Literatur-Blatt of Eduard Duller's Phönix. Frühlings-Zeitung für Deutschland and a book-version in Johann David Sauerländer's Phönix-Verlag, including both the original and Duller's version and giving them the subtitle Dramatic Scenes from France's reign of terror to appease the censor. This makes it the only one of Büchner's plays to be published in his lifetime, albeit in a heavily censored version.

For a long time, no theatre dared stage the play; it did not receive its premiere until 1902, long after Büchner's death. This occurred on 5 January, at the Belle-Alliance-Theater in Berlin, in a production by the Vereins Neue Freie Volksbühne.

== Analysis ==
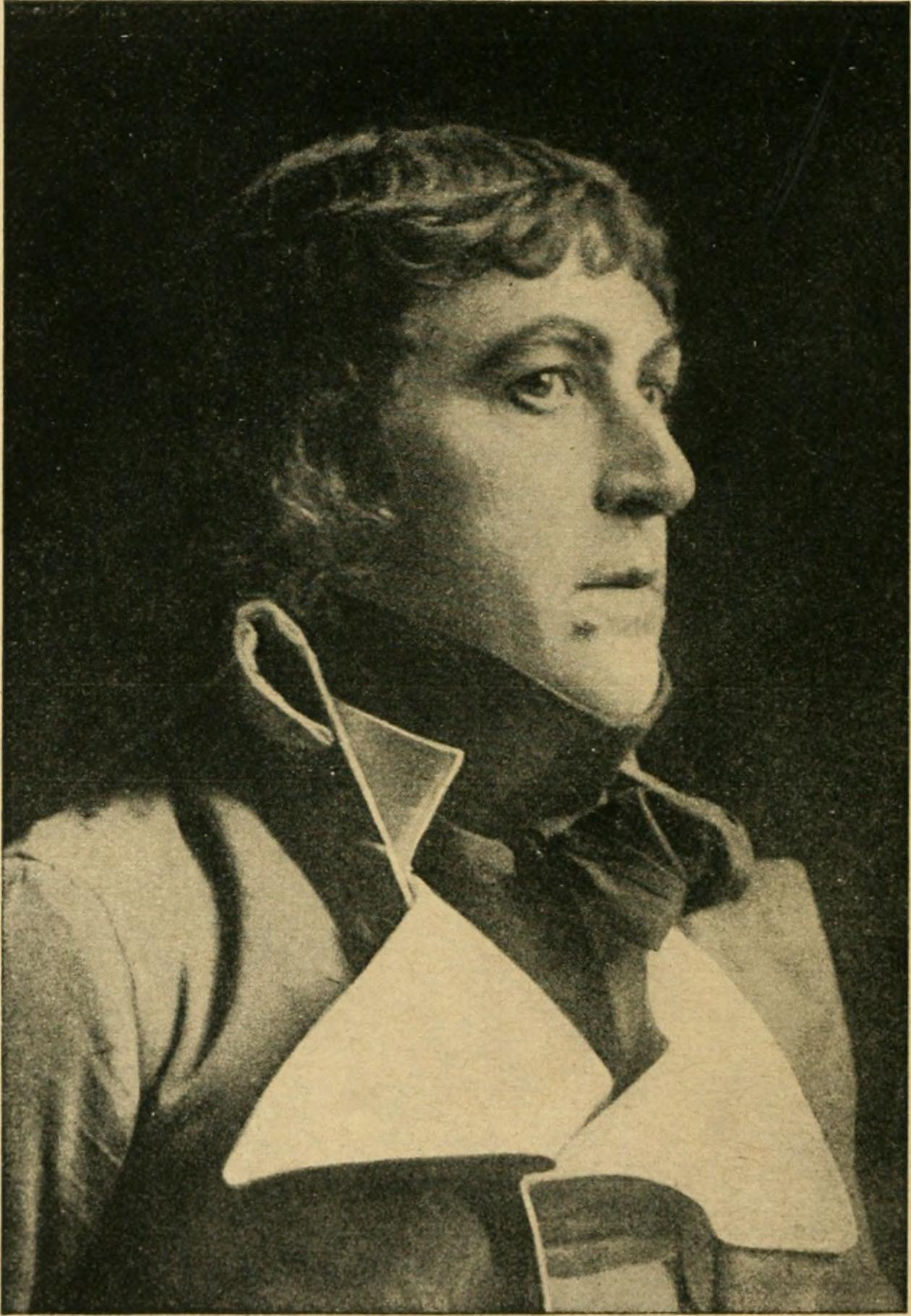
Werner Krauß in 'Dantons Tod'

Its use of numerous historical sources and extensive quotations from original political speeches meant that the play was seen in the 20th century as the precursor to documentary theatre. Until 1979 no one had explored the themes and inner connections within Büchner's work between Eros and Violence systematically – that year saw Reinhold Grimm treat it in text und kritik, Georg Büchner, and it was continued in the present Georg Büchner Jahrbuch 11 (2005–2008).

== Plot summary ==
The play follows the story of Georges Danton, a leader of the French Revolution, during the lull between the first and second terrors. Georges Danton created the office of the Revolutionary Tribunal as a strong arm for the Revolutionary Government. With this, to be accused of anything real or imagined was to be condemned to death without trial, proofs, evidence or witnesses. Within months he knew this power was a terrible mistake and fought to have it ended. Robespierre stopped him and used the Tribunal to have Danton and all opposition killed, consolidate his power and slaughter uncounted thousands of French men, women, and children. Ultimately he followed Danton to the guillotine. Witnesses describe Danton as dying bravely comforting other innocents executed with him.

=== Second act ===
Danton's friends press him to fight or flee Robespierre's supporters, but Danton does not see any need to do so and does not believe that the French National Convention will dare to act against him. Danton confides the guilt he feels for the September Massacres in his wife Julie. Danton is imprisoned and led before the National Assembly, which is divided – it feels it has no choice but to acquit him. However, Robespierre and Saint-Just reverse its opinion.

=== Third act ===
The prisoners discuss the existence of God and life, and an attempt to prove that God does not exist fails. Danton's supporters are transferred to the Conciergerie. During this time the revolutionary tribunal arranges for its jury to be made up of honest and faithful men. Danton appears confidently before the tribunal, impressing the public with his willingness for justice to be done. Seeing the hearers' sympathy for Danton, the court is adjourned. The tribunal's members invent a plot to change the public's mind. At the tribunal's second sitting, the people stop supporting Danton, due to his lifestyle. Danton's liberal programme is revealed as unacceptable to the masses.

=== Fourth act ===
Danton and his supporters are condemned to death. Danton and his friend Camille Desmoulins exchange thoughts on life and death. Danton's wife Julie, who has pledged to be loyal to him beyond death, poisons herself at their home. The people show themselves to be curious and ironic on Danton's way to the scaffold. When Lucile Desmoulins sees her husband Camille mount the scaffold, she goes mad and resolves to die too, crying "Long live the king!" and thus guaranteeing her own death sentence.

== Characters ==
=== Georges Danton ===
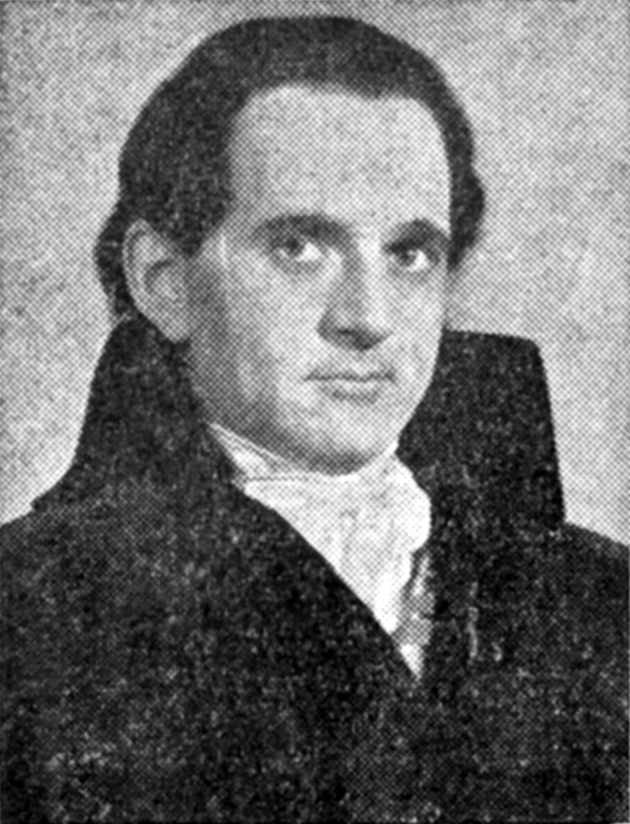
Martin Gabel as Danton in the Mercury Theatre's Broadway production of Danton's Death (1938)

He is portrayed as a man, at his ease, with innate hedonism, with respect for the recent successes of the Revolution but doubts as to its other objectives. The atmosphere around Danton is marked by wine, gaming and easy women. This is contrary to the realities of the revolution, characterised by poverty, begging, drunkenness and prostitution (1.5). Danton was once poor and owes his current wealth to a gift from the Duke of Orleans, who tried to bribe his way to the French throne and gave Danton a gift as part of this attempt (S. 74, Z. 1–13).

Danton is also portrayed as a hero who stands up against Robespierre's unnecessary killings (Einfach Deutsch; S. 73, Z. 9–12): You want bread and he throws out heads. You thirst and he leads you to the guillotine to lick up the blood. He even takes his premature death as inevitable, with a death wish: Life is evidently a burden to me, please take it away from me, I long to be there to take it off (S. 60, Z. 13–14). Danton has a strong bond of love to his wife Julie, without whom he will not die.

=== Maximilien Robespierre ===
He is shown as recognising the plight of the people, who admire him as "virtuous" and "the incorruptible". Even he is not always virtuous, as is already visible at the start of the play in his conversation with Danton. Robespierre is accused of killing people in order to distract from the ongoing famine. He is presented both as a man with a social conscience and as one who moves against Danton to convince the people of their own power. Other revolutionaries describe Robespierre's policy as that of a terrorist.

=== Others ===
- Louis Legendre, Camille Desmoulins, Marie-Jean Hérault de Séchelles, Lacroix, Philippeau – Dantonist deputies in the National Convention
- St Just, Bertrand Barère, Jean-Marie Collot d'Herbois – members of the Committee of Public Safety
- Julie – Danton's wife
- Lucile Desmoulins – Camille Desmoulins's wife
- Paris – Danton's friend
- Marion – a prostitute

== Adaptations ==
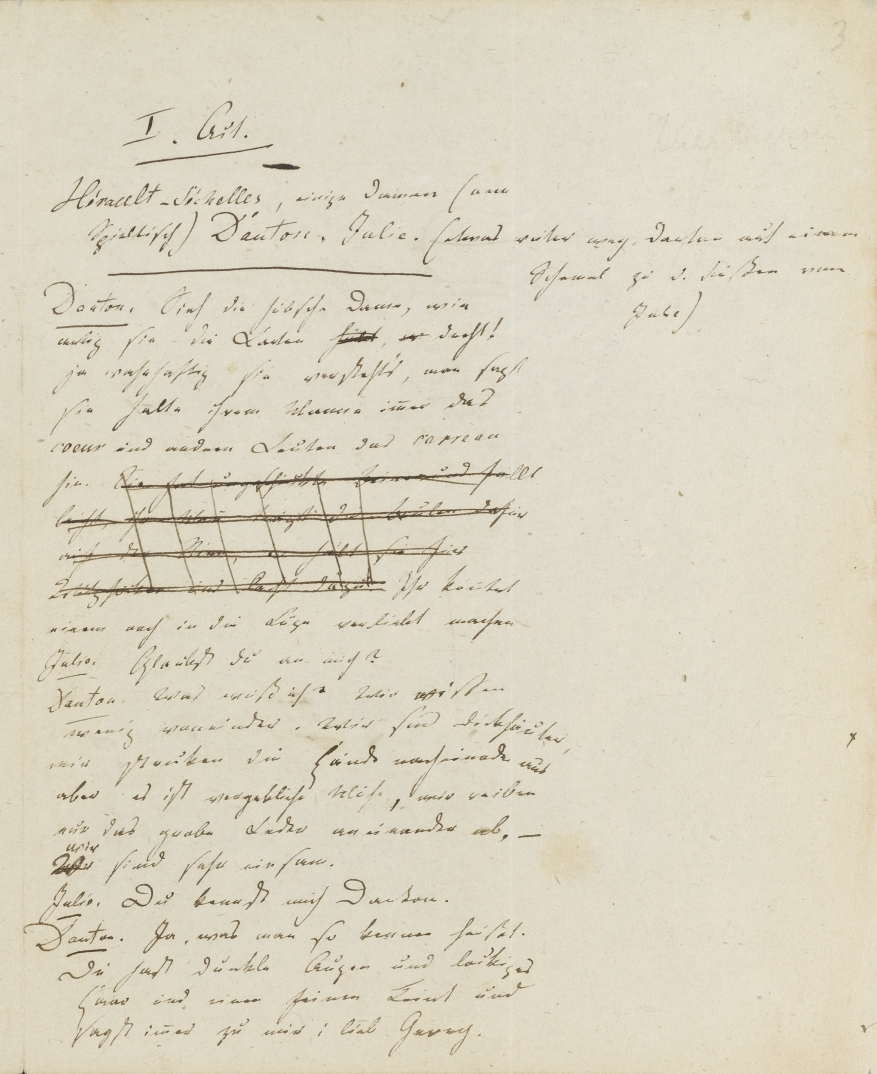
Büchner's manuscript of "Danton's Death", Act 1, Scene 1.

- It was the basis for the 1921 German silent film Danton directed by Dimitri Buchowetzki and starring Emil Jannings as Danton.
- It was adapted as an opera by Gottfried von Einem, in a work also titled Dantons Tod and premiered in 1947 at the Salzburg Festival. New Sussex Opera gave the British premiere at the Brighton Festival in 1997.
- It was "freely adapted" (incorporating some material from Büchner's Woyzeck) for a BBC Play of the Month in 1978 by Stuart Griffiths and director Alan Clarke, with Norman Rodway as Danton and Ian Richardson as Robespierre.
- It was adapted by the English playwright Howard Brenton in 1982 as Danton's Death, using a translation by Brenton's wife, Jane Fry.
- In March 1987 the Rude Mechanicals staged a new translation and adaptation by Peter Christian and Margarete Forsyth at the Young Vic Studio.
- In 2010, Brenton created a new version of the play for a revival at the Royal National Theatre, directed by Michael Grandage and starring Toby Stephens as Danton.
- On 13 February 2011, BBC Radio 3 premiered a radio adaptation by Simon Scardifield, with Joseph Millson as Danton and Khalid Abdalla as Robespierre, directed by Jessica Dromgoole.

== Editions ==
- Büchner, Georg (1835). Dantons Tod. Dramatische Bilder aus Frankreichs Schreckenherrschaft. Frankfurt/Main: J. D. Sauerländer.
- Georg Büchner: Schriften und Briefe. Dokumente. Hrsg. v. Henri Poschmann unter Mitarb. v. Rosemarie Poschmann. Bd. 1. Bibliothek Deutscher Klassiker. Bd 84. Deutscher Klassiker Verlag, Frankfurt am Main 1992, S.11–90. ISBN 3-618-60090-9
- Georg Büchner: Sämtliche Werke und Schriften. Bd. 3 in 4 Teilbänden. Danton's Tod. Marburger Ausgabe. Hrsg. v. Burghard Dedner und Thomas Michael Mayer. Wissenschaftliche Buchgesellschaft, Darmstadt 2000. ISBN 3-534-14520-8 The standard critical edition.
- Georg Büchner: Werke und Briefe. Münchener Ausgabe. Hrsg. v. Karl Pörnbacher, Gerhard Schaub, Hans-Joachim Simm, Edda Ziegler. 8. Auflage. Hanser, München 2001, S.67–133. ISBN 3-423-12374-5
- Büchner, Georg (2007). Staiger, Ulrich (ed.). Dantons Tod. Ausgabe mit Materialien. Stuttgart: Ernst Klett. ISBN 978-3-12-352435-6. The text is that of Pörnbacher, 1988.
- Büchner, Georg (2018). Kellermann, Ralf (ed.). Dantons Tod. Text und Kontext. Stuttgart: Reclam. ISBN 978-3-15-019037-1. The text is that of the Marburg edition.

== Translations and adaptations ==
- Büchner, Georg (1928). The plays of Georg Büchner. Translated by Dunlop, Geoffrey. New York: Viking.
- Büchner, Georg (1939). Danton's Death: A Play in Four Acts. Translated by Spender, Stephen; Rees, Goronwy. London: Faber.
- Büchner, Georg (1963). Complete Plays and Prose. Translated by Mueller, Carl Richard. New York: Hill & Wang. pp. 1–71.
- Buechner, Georg (1968). Danton's Death. Translated by Maxwell, James. London: Methuen.
- Büchner, Georg (1971). Danton’s Death Leonce and Lena Woyzeck. Translated by Price, Victor. Oxford: Oxford University Press. ISBN 978-0-19-283650-2.
- Büchner, Georg (1971). Danton’s Death. Translated by Schmidt, Henry J. New York: Avon. Also available in Büchner, Georg (1977). The Complete Collected Works. Translated by Schmidt, Henry J. New York: Avon. ISBN 0380018152.
- Büchner, Georg (1982). Danton's Death. Translated by Brenton, Howard. London: Methuen. ISBN 0413512606.
- Büchner, Georg (1982). Danton's Death. Translated by Rappolt, Hedwig. New York: TSL. ISBN 0939858029.
- Büchner, Georg (1993). Complete Plays, Lenz and Other Writings. Translated by Reddick, John. London: Penguin. pp. 1–73. ISBN 9780140445862.
- Büchner, Georg (2005). Danton's Death. Translated by Auletta, Robert. New York: Broadway Play Publishing. ISBN 9780881452716.
- Büchner, Georg (2010). Danton's Death. Translated by Brenton, Howard. London: Methuen. ISBN 9781408132838.
- Büchner, Georg (13 February 2011). "Danton's Death". Drama on 3. BBC. Radio 3. Archived from the original on 23 November 2023. Translated by Simon Scardifield.
- Büchner, Georg (2026). Danton's Death. Translated by Christian, Peter; Forsyth, Margarete.

== Bibliography ==
- Benn, Maurice B (1976). "Danton's Death". The Drama of Revolt. A Critical Study of Georg Büchner. Cambridge: Cambridge University Press. pp. 103–156. ISBN 0521208289.
- Borgards, Roland; Neumeyer, Harald, eds. (2015). Büchner Handbuch. Leben - Werk - Wirkung. Stuttgart, Weimar: Metzler. ISBN 978-3-476-02569-2.
- Buckley, Matthew S. (2006). "Reviving the Revolution: Dantons Tod". Tragedy Walks the Streets. The French Revolution in the Making of Modern Drama. Baltimore: Johns Hopkins University. pp. 120–152. ISBN 0-8018-8434-9.
- Grimm, Reinhold (1985). Love, Lust, and Rebellion New Approaches to Georg Büchner. Madison, London: University of Wisconsin. ISBN 0-299-09860-5.
- Hauser, Ronald (1974). Georg Büchner. Twayne's World Authors. Vol. 300. New York: Twayne. ISBN 0-8057-2183-5.
- Hilton, Julian (1982). Georg Büchner. London: Macmillan. ISBN 0333291093.
- Jacobs, Margaret, ed. (1996). Georg Büchner. Dantons Tod and Woyzeck (4 ed.). Manchester: Manchester University. ISBN 0-7190-4353-0.. German text with Introduction and Notes in English.
- James, Dorothy (1982). Georg Büchner's 'Dantons Tod': A Reappraisal. London: Modern Humanities Research Association. ISBN 0900547774.
- Knapp, Gerhard P. (2000). Georg Büchner (3 ed.). Stuttgart: Metzler. ISBN 3-476-13159-9.
- Reddick, John (1994). Georg Büchner. The Shattered Whole. Oxford: Clarendon. ISBN 0-19-815812-2.
