= Peter the Great (1922 film) =

1922 film directed by Dimitri Buchowetzki

- American poster
- Directed by: Dimitri Buchowetzki
- Written by: Ludwig Metzger-Hollands
- Starring: Emil Jannings; Bernhard Goetzke; Dagny Servaes; Fritz Kortner
- Cinematography: Curt Courant; Willy Hameister
- Production company: Europäische Film-Allianz
- Distributed by: National Film (Germany); Paramount Pictures (US)
- Release date: 2 November 1922
- Running time: 112 minutes
- Country: Germany
- Languages: Silent; German intertitles

Peter the Great (German: Peter der Große) is a 1922 German silent historical film directed by Dimitri Buchowetzki and starring Emil Jannings, Bernhard Goetzke and Dagny Servaes. It depicts the life of the reformist Russian Tsar Peter the Great. It premiered in Berlin on 2 November 1922. It was shot at the EFA Studios in Berlin. The film's sets were designed by the art director Hans Dreier.

Buchowetzki had previously directed Jannings in Danton (1921) and Othello (1922). Jannings later played another Russian Tsar, Paul I, in The Patriot (1928).

== Cast ==
- Emil Jannings as Zar Peter der Große
- Bernhard Goetzke as Minister Menschikoff
- Dagny Servaes as Zarin Katharina I
- Fritz Kortner as Patriarch Adrian
- Walter Janssen as Alexis, Zarewitsch
- Cordy Millowitsch as Zarin Eudoxia
- Alexandra Sorina as Aphrosinia

== Bibliography ==
- Petro, Patrice. Idols of Modernity: Movie Stars of the 1920s. Rutgers University Press, 2010.
