= Lucile Desmoulins =

Diarist of the french revolution, wife of the revolutionary Camille Desmoulins

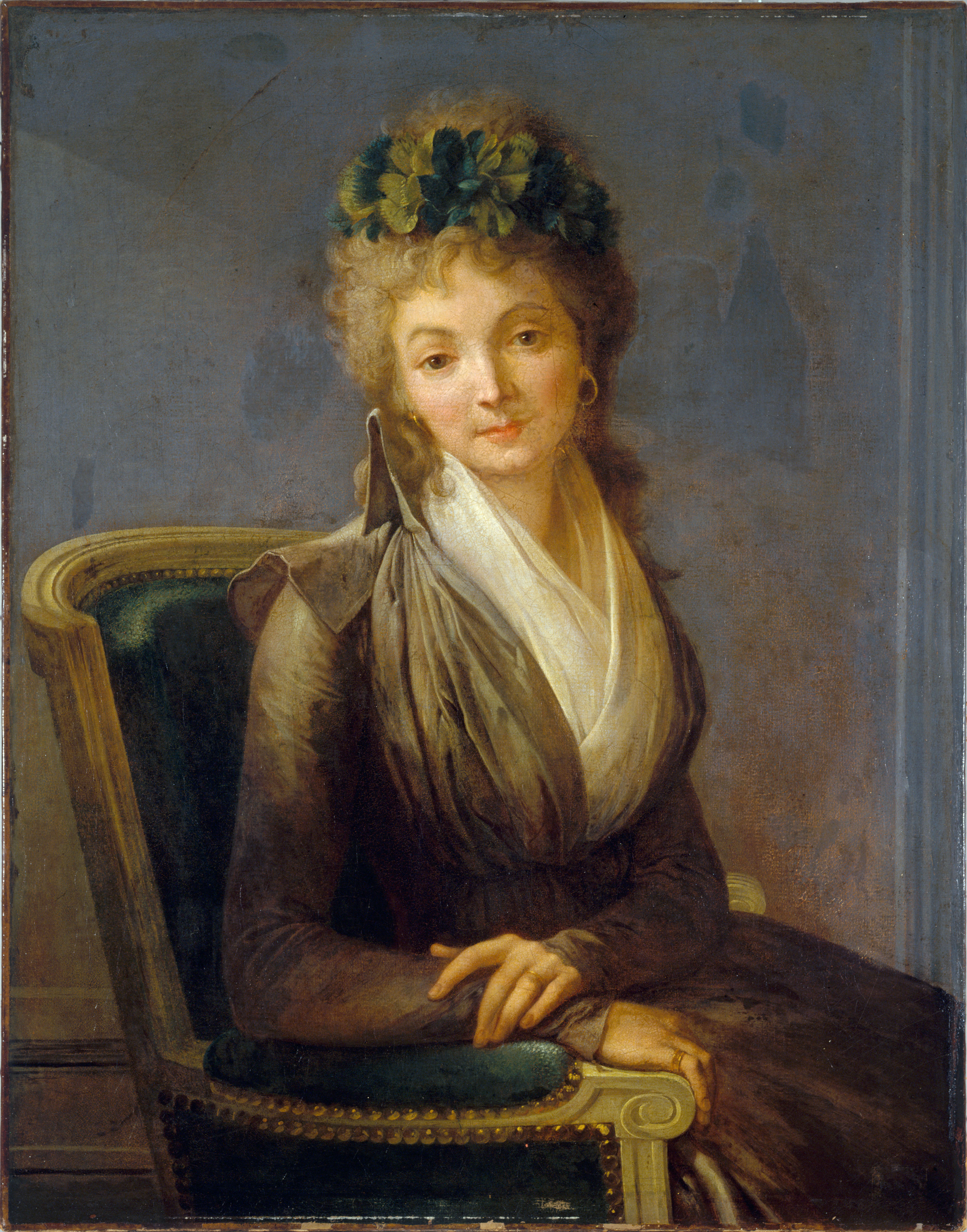
Lucile Desmoulins, portrait by Louis-Léopold Boilly, about 1790

Anne-Lucile-Philippe Desmoulins, born Laridon-Duplessis (18 January 1770 in Paris – 13 April 1794) was a French revolutionary, diarist, and author during the French Revolution. She was married to the revolutionary Camille Desmoulins. She was executed eight days after Camille Desmoulins and Georges Danton, accused of conspiring to free her husband and involvement in counter-revolutionary activities.

== Life and Writings ==
Lucile Duplessis Desmoulins was born in Paris in 1770, the daughter of Claude-Etienne Laridon-Duplessis, an official of the French Treasury, and Anne-Françoise-Marc Bosdeveix (who went by "Annette"). She had one sister, Adèle Duplessis, born in 1774, who some sources have claimed was briefly engaged to Maximilien Robespierre.

Lucile spent her childhood and young adulthood in Paris and on her family's farm in Bourg-la-Reine. She kept several diaries, beginning in 1788. She also authored numerous poems, prose works, and short stories, none of which were published during her lifetime. Though many of her writings have been lost, her diaries from the summers of 1788 and 1789 and from June 1792 to February 1793 have survived.

Lucile’s writings reveal a sharp political awareness and strongly held views. In 1788, she wrote:

What a sad fate it is to be a woman. How much she has to suffer – slavery, tyranny, that is her share. Yet they [masc.] want us to adore them. I believe that they would suffer us to erect altars to them and prostrate ourselves before them with censer in hand, asking them for forgiveness for the evils they make us suffer. To hear them speak, we are celestial beings, nothing is equal to us. Ah! may they deify us less and leave us free!

Lucile was a fervent supporter of the Revolution. In 1789, she wrote of Marie Antoinette: "Fear the example of queens who, like you, do evil: Some have perished in misery, others have borne their heads to the scaffold. This may be the fate that awaits you.” She also wrote a work entitled What I Would Do if I Were in Her Place, in which she envisions being queen and immolating herself on a great pyre. One of Lucile’s short stories, La Volière, tells of a young girl named Cloé who collected nests of baby birds she found in the woods and raised them in an aviary. One day, she returned home to find the aviary had been opened and the birds had escaped and flown away. The story concludes with an interaction between Cloé and her elderly neighbor:

“These ingrates! what had they to desire? I shared with them the bread that was given to me for myself alone. I had them eat out of my hand. How faithfully I went to the garden to gather fruits fallen from the tree for them! I spent whole hours looking for the fresh worms they loved so much for them! [...] During the winter, when the snow covers the fields, where will they seek refuge? They will die of cold and hunger.... If the birdcatcher has not already trapped them to give them to cruel children, or else the inhuman hunter.... O my poor little birds, I pity you! Alas! you will miss me. Cruel parents, it is you who cause us all these evils.”

An elderly shepherdess, her neighbor, had heard the lamentations of young Cloé. Touched by her good heart, she came and said to her, embracing her: “Console yourself, my dear child, do not cry over the fate of your lost birds; all your caresses, all your cares would not have made them happier."

"My good lady, what is it they could have lacked? I might have given it to them."

"Liberty, my dear girl: she is the greatest of blessings. For her, we face the rigors of the seasons, the lime of the birdcatcher, the rifle of the hunter. For her, we forget our benefactress, and that benefactress has no right to call ungrateful those who prefer to her only freedom.”

Lucile’s diaries also reveal a great sadness and sense of alienation. In a diary now lost, she wrote: “I feel that I am born to live far from men. The more I examine them, the more I seek to understand them, the more I see that one should flee from them.” In her work entitled Prière à Dieu, written in 1788, she wrote: “I hate the world. Is this wrong?" An unsent letter to her future husband, written in July 1790, read: "If you love me, run from me; I am a monster."

During the late 1780s, Lucile developed strong feelings for the revolutionary journalist Camille Desmoulins, who was then a good friend of her mother’s. However, she kept these feelings private, both to her parents and to Camille. Lucile’s father repeatedly refused Desmoulins permission to court Lucile. He eventually consented to marriage in late 1790. The couple was married on 29 December 1790, at the Church of Saint Sulpice in Paris. Signatories to their marriage included Jérôme Pétion de Villeneuve, Jacques Pierre Brissot, and Maximilien Robespierre. The Desmoulins' only child, Horace Camille, was born on 6 July 1792.

In one of her journals, Lucile talks about what happened on the Insurrection of 10 August 1792, describing in great detail the events from the perspective of herself, Louise-Félicité de Kéralio, and Gabrielle Danton, as they watched and waited in trepidation at Danton’s apartment.

"9 August 1792. What will become of us? I can endure no more. Camille, oh my poor Camille, what will become of you? Oh God, if it be true that you have existence, save the men who are worthy of you. We want to be free. Oh God, the cost of it! To add to my misery, courage abandons me."

Lucile attended political events frequently. In her diary she described attending the trial and sentencing of Louis XVI in January 1793, repeatedly spending all night at the National Convention and, on one occasion, not going to bed until 8 AM. When the execution of the King was agreed upon, she wrote “Finally we have prevailed.”

Lucile strongly supported Camille Desmoulins in writing Le Vieux Cordelier in the winter of 1793 – 1794, which advocated for freedom of the press, clemency, and a cessation of the Reign of Terror. When General Brune, a friend of the couple, came to dinner and urged Camille to temper his criticisms of the Terror, she stood up for Camille, saying “Let him be, Brune. He must save his country; let him fulfill his mission.” After Camille’s arrest, she wrote a letter to Robespierre, reminding him of his friendship with the family and saying: “Do you believe that the people will gain confidence in you by seeing you immolate your friends? Do you believe that the people will bless one who cares neither for the tears of the widow nor for the death of the orphan? If I were Saint-Just's wife, I would tell him: Camille's cause is your own, it is the cause of all the friends of Robespierre.” After her arrest, Lucile signed her name in the interrogation record as “Femme Camille Desmoulins,” rather than her own name.

On 4 April 1794 Lucile Desmoulins was arrested on charges that she had conspired to free her husband (then imprisoned in the Conciergerie while on trial with Georges-Jacques Danton) and for plotting the ruin of the republic. Camille learned of his young wife’s arrest before he and his fellow victims were taken to the guillotine on the afternoon of 5 April 1794; Camille died knowing that Lucile, too, was likely to be executed. Indeed, Lucile followed him to the guillotine on 13 April 1794, at only 24. Her last letter to her mother reads: "Goodnight, dear Maman. A tear falls from my eyes; it is for you. I am going to sleep in the tranquility of innocence."

Lucile’s father died in 1794. Horace Camille Desmoulins, not yet two years old, was raised by Lucile's mother and sister. He migrated to Haiti in 1817, married, and had four children. Horace died of yellow fever in Jacmel, near the southern coast of Haiti, in 1825. His birth date is stated incorrectly on his grave marker.

== Appreciation ==
Lucile Desmoulins is the heroine of Georg Büchner's play Danton's Death. She appears prominently in A Place of Greater Safety (1993) by Hilary Mantel.

Lucile Desmoulins has been played in movies by:

- Charlotte Ander in Dimitri Buchowetzki's Danton, 1921
- Francine Mussey in Abel Gance's Napoleon, 1927
- Gemma Jones in teleplay Poor Bitos, 1965
- Édith Scob in Claude Barma's La mort de Danton, 1970
- Claude Jade in Jean-Paul Carrères La Passion de Camille et Lucile Desmoulins, 1978
- Angela Winkler in Andrzej Wajda's Danton, 1982
- Marie Bunel in Robert Enrico's La Révolution française, 1989

She is the subject of the fourth movement of composer Kate Soper's piece "Voices from the Killing Jar", 2012.
