= Thou Shalt Not Kill =

"Thou shalt not kill" is one of the Ten Commandments.

Thou Shalt Not Kill may also refer to:

- "Thou Shalt Not Kill" (essay) (1900), an anti-war essay by Leo Tolstoy
- Thou Shalt Not Kill (1913 film) directed by Hal Reid (actor)
- Thou Shalt Not Kill (1923 film), a German silent film
- Thou Shalt Not Kill, a 1939 film directed by John H. Auer
- "Thou Shalt Not Kill", a 1955 poem by Kenneth Rexroth
- Thou Shalt Not Kill (1961 film), a French film directed by Claude Autant-Lara
- Thou Shalt Not Kill, a 1982 American television film starring Gary Graham
- Dekalog: Five, a 1988 film by Krzysztof Kieślowski
- Thou Shalt Not Kill, a 2001 film starring Steven Webb
- "Thou Shalt Not Kill" (Spooks), the premiere episode of British TV series Spooks (2002)
- Thou Shalt Not Kill (TV series), a 2015 Italian television crime drama

== See also ==
- Thou Shalt Not Kill... Except, a 1985 American film
