= Rose Bernd =

Rose Bernd may refer to:

- Rose Bernd (play), a 1903 stage drama by Gerhart Hauptmann
- Rose Bernd (1919 film), a German silent drama film, based on the play
- Rose Bernd (1957 film), a German drama film, based on the play
