= The Sea Battle =

- Directed by: Richard Oswald
- Produced by: Richard Oswald
- Starring: Emil Jannings; Werner Krauss; Conrad Veidt
- Production company: Oswald-Film
- Release date: 1917
- Country: Germany
- Languages: Silent; German intertitles

The Sea Battle (German: Die Seeschlacht) is a 1917 German silent war film directed by Richard Oswald and starring Emil Jannings, Werner Krauss and Conrad Veidt. Comparatively little is known about the production, which is now a lost film.

== Cast ==
- Emil Jannings
- Werner Krauss
- Conrad Veidt

== Bibliography ==
- Jerry C. Allen. Conrad Veidt: from Caligari to Casablanca. Boxwood Press, 1987.
