= Ludwig Hartau =

German actor

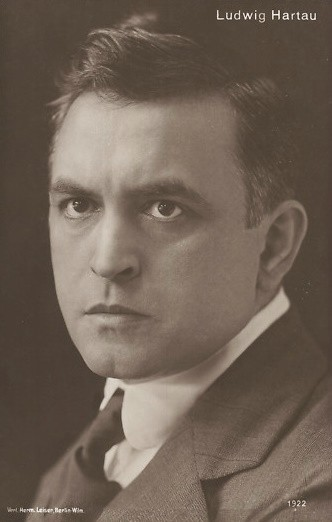
- Hartau ca. 1908
- Born: 17 February 1877; Trachenberg, Province of Silesia, German Empire
- Died: 24 November 1922 (aged 45); Berlin, Germany
- Occupation: Actor
- Years active: 1900–1922

Ludwig Hartau (19 February 1877 – 24 November 1922) was a German actor.

== Selected filmography ==
- The Dancer (1915)
- Hungernde Millionäre (1919)
- Baccarat (1919)
- The Three Dances of Mary Wilford (1920)
- Anna Boleyn (1920)
- Four Around a Woman (1921)
- Marie Antoinette, the Love of a King (1922)
- Maciste and the Silver King's Daughter (1922)
- Napoleon's Daughter (1922)
- Two Worlds (1922)
- Today's Children (1922)
- The Treasure of Gesine Jacobsen (1923)
- The Beautiful Girl (1923)

== Bibliography ==
- Jung, Uli & Schatzberg, Walter. Beyond Caligari: The Films of Robert Wiene. Berghahn Books, 1999.
