= Kate Soper (composer) =

American classical composer

Kate Soper (born 1981) is a composer and vocalist. She was a recent American Academy in Rome fellow and Guggenheim Fellow as well as a 2012–13 fellow of the Radcliffe Institute for Advanced Study. She was a finalist for the 2017 Pulitzer Prize in Music for her chamber opera, Ipsa Dixit.

== Style ==
In addition to composing, Soper performs frequently as a new music soprano in her own works and the works of others, and many of her vocal works were developed with herself in mind as performer. Her compositional style has been deemed "exquisitely quirky" with "seamless commingling of not only lines but of actual instrumentation and fingering with another player."

== Commissions ==
Recent commissions for work as a performer/composer include a 2012 Guggenheim fellowship for a one-act opera with original libretto, Here Be Sirens; a Koussevitsky Commission for a music theatre work performed with Alarm Will Sound; and now is forever for soprano and orchestra from the American Composers Orchestra.

== Wet Ink ==
Since 2006, Soper has served as a co-director and vocalist for Wet Ink, a New York-based new music ensemble founded in 1998 and dedicated to the presentation of programs of new music, with a focus on creating, promoting, and organizing American music. In addition to a New York concert season featuring many of the city's freelancers, Wet Ink performs as a septet consisting of a core group of composer-performers that collaborate in a band-like fashion, writing, improvising, preparing, and touring pieces together over long stretches of time. Alongside fellow composer/directors Alex Mincek (saxophone/founding member), Sam Pluta (electronics), Eric Wubbels (piano), and performers Ian Antonio (percussion), Erin Lesser (founding member, flute), and Josh Modney (violin), Soper frequently tours, performs with, and writes for the Wet Ink Ensemble. Her large-scale monodrama for the group, Voices from the Killing Jar, was released on Carrier Records in 2014.

== Awards and fellowships ==
- Kravis Emerging Composers 2024
- Rome Prize Fellow, 2023–2024
- Radcliffe Institute for Advanced Study Fellow, 2012–2013
- Serge Koussevitzky Foundation Grant, 2012
- John Simon Guggenheim Memorial Foundation Fellow, 2012
- Lili Boulanger Memorial Fund Annual Prize Winner, 2012
- Camargo Foundation Fellow, 2009
- Fromm Music Foundation Fromm Commission, 2008
- Tanglewood Music Center Fellow, 2006.

== List of works ==
=== Vocal ===
- Orpheus Orchestra Opus Onus (soprano and orchestra), 2025
- Now is forever (soprano and orchestra), 2012–2013
- The Crito (soprano and percussion), 2012
- Only the words themselves mean what they say (soprano and flute), 2010–2011
- cipher (soprano and violin), 2011–12
- Nadja (soprano and string quartet), upcoming 2013
- Voices from the Killing Jar (voice, flute, sax/clarinet, piano, violin/trumpet, piano, electronics), 2010–12
- Helen Enfettered (soprano, mezzo-soprano, clarinet, trumpet, piano, violin, viola, cello, contrabass), 2009, a setting of the "e" chapter of Christian Bök's Eunoia.
- Door (voice, flute, saxophone, electric guitar, accordion), 2007
- Songs for Nobody (two sopranos and alto), 2006
- What you think of in the city (baritone, viola, cello), 2002
- Ipsa Dixit (voice, violin, flute, percussion), 2016

=== Instrumental ===
- Entre les Calanques (orchestra; original chamber version with flute, cello, bassoon, two horns, three violins, three violas, two cellos, two contrabasses), 2010
- Nine Rakes (wind orchestra), 2007
- The door in the wall (flute, oboe, two clarinets, bassoon, horn, trumpet, tn, piano, two percussionist, two violins, viola, cello, contrabass), 2011, revised 2012
- What makes it go (flute, oboe, two clarinets, bassoon, horn, trumpet, tn, piano, percussion, two violins, viola, cello, contrabass; original version with three violins, three violas, three cellos, three contrabasses) 2010, original version 2008
- As the Crow Flies (flute, clarinet, two saxophones, horn, trumpet, trombone, electric guitar, accordion, piccolo, violin, viola, cello, contrabass), 2007
- Didcas (brass septet), 2006
- Crosshatch (flute, clarinet, horn, trumpet, trombone, piccolo, violin, viola, cello, contrabass), 2005
- In the Reign of Harad IV (amplified percussion trio), upcoming, 2013
- Wolf (piano four hands and two percussionists), 2010
- The Sleep Side (clarinet, trumpet, piano, and percussion), 2010
- I had a Slow Thought on a Hard Day (alto saxophone and accordion), 2008
- Into that World Inverted (horn and piano), 2006, revised 2010
- Purl (flute and percussion), 2006
- Knock (solo percussion), 2006

=== Theatrical ===
- The Hunt (three voices, ukulele, violin), 2023
- The Romance of the Rose (seven voices, electronics, ensemble), 2021
- IPSA DIXIT (soprano, flute, violin and percussion), 2016
- I Was Here I Was I (voices and chamber ensemble), 2014
- Here be Sirens (three voices, piano), 2014

=== Electronic ===
- Five One-liners (tape), 2003

=== Discography ===
- The Romance of the Rose (as composer/performer/librettist) (Wet Ink, New Focus Recordings, 2024)
- The Hunt (as composer/librettist)(New Focus Recordings, 2024)
- Missing Scenes (as composer/vocalist)(Wet Ink, Carrier Records, 2023)
- The Understanding of All Things (as composer/vocalist/pianist)(Sam Pluta, New Focus Recordings, 2022)
- Ipsa Dixit (as composer/vocalist) (Wet Ink, New World Records, 2018)
- Wet Ink: 20 (as composer/vocalist) (Wet Ink, Carrier Records, 2018)
- Josh Modney: Engage (as composer/vocalist) (New Focus, 2018)
- SaxoVoce (as composer) (Ogni Suono, New Focus, 2018)
- Hushers (as composer) (Quince Contemporary Vocal Ensemble, New Focus, 2017)
- The Garden of Diverging Paths (as composer/soprano) (Mivos Quartet, New Focus, 2016)
- Voices from the Killing Jar (as composer/soprano)(Wet Ink, Carrier Records 2014)
- Texturen (as soprano/vocalist) (Katherina Rosenberger, Hat Art, 2011)
- Tone Builders (as composer) (Yarn/Wire, Carrier Records, 2010)
- Wet Ink (as composer/soprano) (Wet Ink, Carrier Records, 2009)
- the language of (as composer) (quiet design, 2008)
