= Rebel Liesel =

1920 film

- German: Putschliesel
- Directed by: Erich Schönfelder
- Written by: Erich Schönfelder; Tyll Uhl
- Produced by: Paul Davidson
- Starring: Ossi Oswalda
- Cinematography: Willy Gaebel
- Production company: PAGU
- Distributed by: UFA
- Release date: October 1920
- Country: Germany
- Languages: Silent; German intertitles

Rebel Liesel (German: Putschliesel) is a 1920 German silent film directed by Erich Schönfelder and starring Ossi Oswalda. The film's sets were designed by the art director Kurt Richter.

== Cast ==
In alphabetical order

- Josefine Dora as Lore
- Guido Herzfeld
- Victor Janson as village policeman Bullrich
- Bruno Kretschmar as mayor Kraft
- Ossi Oswalda as Liesel
- Albert Paulig
- Charles Puffy as Ammenvermittler Rund
- Julia Serda
- Hermann Thimig as Theodor
