= Marie-Josée Kravis Prize for New Music =

- Awarded for: "a composer for extraordinary artistic endeavor in the field of new music."
- Sponsored by: Henry R. Kravis
- Location: New York City
- Country: United States
- Reward: US$200,000
- First award: 2011
- Website: nyphil.org/kravis

The Marie-Josée Kravis Prize for New Music at the New York Philharmonic is awarded to "a composer for extraordinary artistic endeavor in the field of new music." The prize money is US$200,000. The prize includes also a commission for the New York Philharmonic. The award is given biennially. The orchestra named also Kravis Emerging Composers, who receive a US$50,000 stipend and a commission. A US$10 million gift in 2009 founded the prize. The money was given to the New York Philharmonic by Henry R. Kravis in honor of his wife, Marie-Josée.

== Recipients ==
- 2011 Henri Dutilleux
- 2014 Per Nørgård
- 2016 Louis Andriessen
- 2018 Unsuk Chin
- 2024 Missy Mazzoli
- 2024 David Lang

== Kravis Emerging Composers ==
- 2012 Sean Shepherd
- 2015 Anna Thorvaldsdottir
- 2024 Kate Soper
