= The Golden Crown =

1920 film

- Directed by: Alfred Halm
- Written by: Hans Brennert; Alfred Halm; Olga Wohlbrück (novel)
- Starring: Henny Porten; Paul Hartmann; Hugo Pahlke
- Cinematography: Willy Gaebel
- Music by: Giuseppe Becce
- Production company: Messter Film
- Distributed by: UFA
- Release date: 6 August 1920
- Country: Germany
- Languages: Silent; German intertitles

The Golden Crown (German: Die goldene Krone) is a 1920 German silent film directed by Alfred Halm and starring Henny Porten, Paul Hartmann, and Hugo Pahlke.

The film's sets were designed by the art director Ludwig Kainer.

== Cast ==
- Henny Porten as Marianne
- Paul Hartmann as Herzog Franz Günther
- Hugo Pahlke as Kurt von der Greinz
- Margarete Schön as Prinzessin Elvira
- Gustav Czimeg as Herr von Zollingen
- Albert Patry as Stöven
- Elsa Wagner as Stövens Frau
- Hermann Thimig as Klaus, Stövens Sohn
- Hermann Vallentin as Gustav Lindlieb
- Elise Zachow-Vallentin as Luise Lindliebs Frau
- Lisel Verdier as Zofe

== Bibliography ==
- Alfred Krautz. International directory of cinematographers, set- and costume designers in film, Volume 4. Saur, 1984.
