= Willy Gaebel =

German cinematographer

- Born: 8 February 1879; Graudenz, West Prussia, German Empire
- Died: 1945 (aged 65–66); Berlin, Germany
- Occupation: Cinematographer
- Years active: 1911-1927 (film)

Willy Gaebel (8 February 1879 – 1945) was a German cinematographer active during the silent era. Employed on a number of films at the major studio UFA, he later worked as a still photographer.

== Selected filmography ==
- Her Sport (1919)
- Rose Bernd (1919)
- Ruth's Two Husbands (1919)
- The Living Dead (1919)
- A Drive into the Blue (1919)
- The Three Dances of Mary Wilford (1920)
- Monika Vogelsang (1920)
- Hundemamachen (1920)
- Rebel Liesel (1920)
- The Golden Crown (1920)
- The Lady in Black (1920)
- The Pearl of the Orient (1921)
- The Bull of Olivera (1921)
- The Fateful Day (1921)
- Hannerl and Her Lovers (1921)
- A Blackmailer's Trick (1921)
- Today's Children (1922)
- It Illuminates, My Dear (1922)
- Lumpaci the Vagabond (1922)
- The Weather Station (1923)
- The Pilgrimage of Love (1923)
- The Secret of Brinkenhof (1923)
- Mother and Child (1924)
- Colibri (1924)
- Kaddish (1924)
- The Director General (1925)
- The Heart on the Rhine (1925)
- The Painter and His Model (1925)
- Niniche (1925)
- Vanina (1925)
- False Shame (1926)
- The Master of Death (1926)
- Professor Imhof (1926)
- Fedora (1926)

== Bibliography ==
- Jung, Uli & Schatzberg, Walter. Beyond Caligari: The Films of Robert Wiene. Berghahn Books, 1999.
