= Thou Shalt Not Kill (1923 film) =

1923 film

- Directed by: Fritz Hofbauer
- Written by: M. Koritowska
- Starring: Werner Krauss; Emil Jannings
- Production company: Wiking Film AG
- Release date: 6 August 1923
- Country: Germany
- Languages: Silent; German intertitles

Thou Shalt Not Kill (German: Du sollst nicht töten) is a 1923 German silent film directed by Fritz Hofbauer and starring Werner Krauss and Emil Jannings.

== Cast ==
- Werner Krauss as Prof. Marquardt
- Julia Terry as Dorrit
- Frl. Ferryda as Ellen
- Emil Jannings as Harold Hilbrich
- Fritz Hofbauer as Konrad Hilbrich
- Hermann Thimig as Fritz

== Bibliography ==
- Bock, Hans-Michael & Bergfelder, Tim. The Concise CineGraph. Encyclopedia of German Cinema. Berghahn Books, 2009.
