= Alfred Halm =

Austrian screenwriter and film director

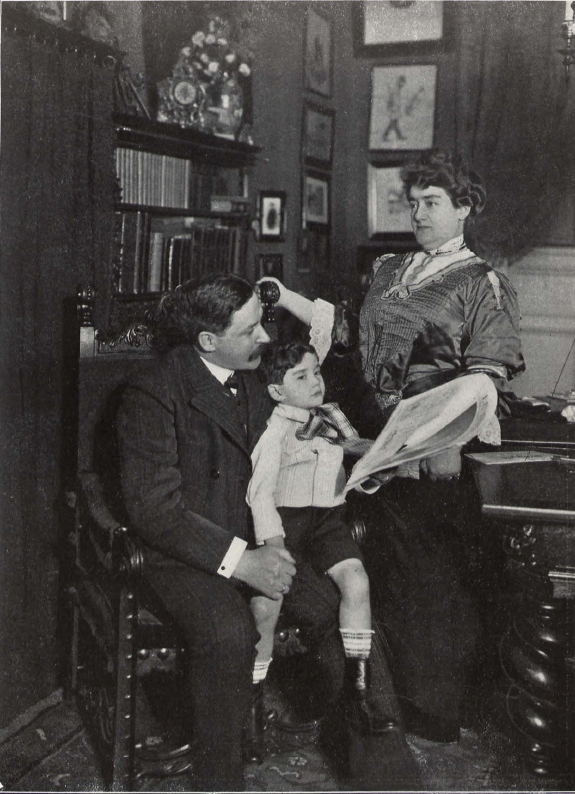
- Alfred Halm and family in 1905, his American-born wife Minnie Landes and son, Harry.
- Born: Alfred Hahn; 9 December 1861; Vienna, Austrian Empire
- Died: 5 February 1951 (aged 89); West Berlin, West Germany
- Other name: H. Fredal
- Occupations: Film director, screenwriter
- Years active: 1914–1933
- Relatives: Harry Halm (son)

Alfred Halm (born Alfred Hahn; 9 December 1861 – 5 February 1951) was an Austrian screenwriter and film director. He was the father of the actor Harry Halm, who being a Jew after the Nazis seized power in 1933, could not take part in further films until World War II ended.

== Selected filmography ==
=== Screenwriter ===
- A Drive into the Blue (1919)
- By Order of Pompadour (1924)
- Love's Finale (1925)
- Her Husband's Wife (1926)
- The Schimeck Family (1926)
- When I Came Back (1926)
- Vienna, How it Cries and Laughs (1926)
- The Bohemian Dancer (1926)
- The White Horse Inn (1926)
- How Do I Marry the Boss? (1927)
- The Most Beautiful Woman in Paris (1928)
- Villa Falconieri (1928)
- Dolly Gets Ahead (1930)
- Cruiser Emden (1932)
- The Emperor's Waltz (1933)
- Happy (1933)

=== Director ===
- The Ring of Giuditta Foscari (1917)
- The Serenyi (1918)
- The Nun and the Harlequin (1918)
- Rose Bernd (1919)
- Pogrom (1919)
- The Peruvian (1919)
- The Gallant King (1920)
- The Golden Crown (1920)
- The Last Kolczaks (1920)
- The Marquise of Armiani (1920)
- The Oath of Peter Hergatz (1921)
- Marquise von Pompadour (1922)
- Friend Ripp (1923)
- The Woman on the Panther (1923)
- The Gypsy Girl at the Alcove (1923)
- The Man on the Comet (1925)

== Bibliography ==
- Kreimeier, Klaus. The UFA Story: A Story of Germany's Greatest Film Company 1918-1945. University of California Press, 1999.
