= Voices from the Killing Jar =

Voices from the Killing Jar is a musical composition by the American composer Kate Soper. Composed in 2010–2012 for the Wet Ink Ensemble and released by Carrier Records on January 1, 2014, this work was written before Soper’s renowned chamber opera Ipsa Dixit, which was a finalist for the 2017 Pulitzer Prize in Music. Voices from the Killing Jar speaks directly to the #MeToo and #NeverAgain movements. The title was inspired by the device "killing jar" that entomologists use to trap and kill insects with minimal damage to their bodies. The composition invites connections between characters both historical and fictional from widely varying cultures and times. The music examines the ways that eight different women are portrayed in storytelling, with characters borrowed from sources as diverse as Shakespeare, Flaubert, F. Scott Fitzgerald and Haruki Murakami.

== Instrumentation ==
Voices from the Killing Jar is a piece for seven performers: voice/clarinet/percussion/piano, flute, saxophone/clarinet, piano, violin/trumpet, percussion, and live electronics. The instrumental parts have the musicians switching out instruments and moving about the stage. The soprano plays the clarinet, piano, and a number of percussion instruments, while a percussionist and electronics add textures.

== Movements ==
The piece is in eight movements. The music depicts a series of female subjects, trapped in their own killing jars: hopeless situations, inescapable fates, impossible fantasies, and other unlucky circumstances.

1. Prelude: May Kasahara
2. Isabel Archer: My Last Duchess
3. Palilalia: Iphegenia
4. Midnight's Tolling: Lucile Duplessis
5. Mad Scene: Emma Bovary
6. Interlude: Asta Solilja
7. The Owl and the Wren: Lady Macduff
8. Her Voice is Full of Money (a deathless song): Daisy Buchanan

The first movement introduces May Kasahara, a character from The Wind-Up Bird Chronicles by the Japanese author Murakami. She describes how her fascination with death and the deterioration of human life influenced her to commit acts of violence and cruelty. The second moment presents Isabel Archer's tragic marriage from Robert Browning's poem My Last Duchess (with Browning himself borrowing from Henry James’ The Portrait of a Lady). In the third movement, triggered by the sacrifice of the daughter Iphigenia, Clytemnestra justifies her rationale for committing murder of her husband. The fourth movement introduces an angry, bloodthirsty prison diary by Lucile Duplessis, who is remembered as the wife of French Revolutionary Camille Desmoulins. The fifth movement, interpolated with Mozart’s Le nozze di Figaro, shows Madame Bovary’s desire to rise above the banality of her life. In the sixth movement, a young girl Asta Solilja from Halldór Laxness's novel Independent People finds beauty and a dream of love while cloud-gazing on her father's harshly isolated sheep farm in 19th century Iceland. The seventh movement depicts a Celtic folk tune sung by Lady Macduff to her son-to-be murdered son, with distorted electronics disrupting her voice. The final movement borrows from F. Scott Fitzgerald's The Great Gatsby. Daisy Buchanan's voice is described by Fitzgerald as "a singing compulsion," "an exhilarating ripple," "a deathless song" and "full of money". The sorrowful song extols her claims to happiness.

== Discography ==
- Album Voices from the Killing Jar (2014), recorded by Kate Soper and the Wet Ink Ensemble, released by Carrier Records

== Reception ==
In 2014, Kurt Gottschalk noted on the multimedia hub I Care if You Listen: "Soper is in some sense lashing out. But the tales she (re)tells tend less toward protest than remorse, making for better – and no less effective – stories." In 2015, Michael Lewanski at the Northwestern New Music Conference (NUNC) describes the piece as "ambitious, striking conception" and "a menace, a prison, an enactment of forces of repression". In 2018, Eric Skelly at the Houston Chronicle stated: "(This is) a score composed in a modernist aesthetic, fueling a disquieting performance that spoke directly to the #MeToo and #NeverAgain movements. Pretty was never the point."
