= Heinrich Lilienfein =

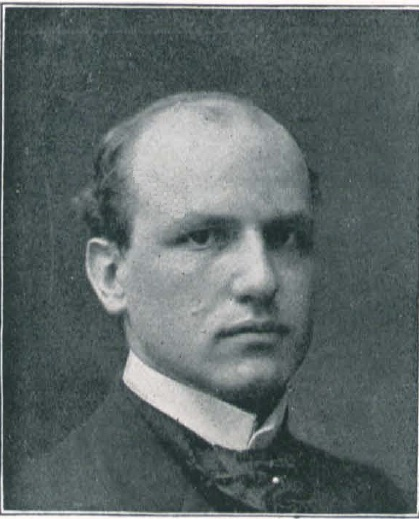
Heinrich Lilienfein (1908)

Heinrich Lilienfein (20 November 1879 in Stuttgart – 20 December 1952 in Weimar) was a German author and playwright.

== Literary works ==
- Der Stier von Olivera, 1910
- Der versunkene Stern, 1914
- Das fressend Feuer, 1932
- Die Stunde Karls XII, 1938
- Besuch aus Holland, 1943
- Licht und Irrlicht, 1943
- Anna Amalia, 1949
- Bettina, 1949
