= List of drama films of the 1920s =

This is a list of drama films of the 1920s.

== 1920 ==
- The $1,000,000 Reward
- Within Our Gates

== 1921 ==
- Four Horsemen of the Apocalypse
- The Kid
- The Sheik

== 1922 ==
- Oliver Twist

== 1923 ==
- Ashes of Vengeance
- Merry-Go-Round
- White Rose
- A Woman of Paris

== 1924 ==
- Dante's Inferno
- Die Nibelungen
- The Enchanted Cottage
- Greed
- Janice Meredith
- The Last Laugh
- The Saga of Gosta Berling
- Strike
- Tess of the d'Urbervilles

== 1925 ==
- Battleship Potemkin
- The Big Parade
- Die freudlose Gasse
- The Gold Rush
- Variété

== 1926 ==
- The General
- Faust
- Metropolis
- Mother
- A Page of Madness
- Sparrows
- Tartuffe
- Torrent

== 1927 ==
- The End of St. Petersburg
- The Fake
- The Jazz Singer
- The King of Kings
- Love of Jeanne Ney
- Madame Pompadour
- Seventh Heaven
- Sunrise: A Song of Two Humans
- The Way of All Flesh

== 1928 ==
- 4 Devils
- The Crowd
- The Last Command
- Lonesome
- The Man Who Laughs
- Oktyabr
- The Passion of Joan of Arc
- The Patriot
- S.O.S.
- Steamboat Bill, Jr.
- Storm Over Asia
- The Trail of '98
- Thérèse Raquin
- The Wedding March
- The Wind
- Zvenigora

== 1929 ==
- Arsenal
- Diary of a Lost Girl
- Disraeli
- Pandora's Box
- Valiant
