= The Bull of Olivera =

1921 film directed by Erich Schönfelder

- German: Der Stier von Olivera
- Directed by: Erich Schönfelder
- Written by: Dimitri Buchowetzki; Erich Schönfelder; Heinrich Lilienfein (play)
- Starring: Emil Jannings
- Cinematography: Willy Gaebel
- Production company: Messter Film
- Distributed by: UFA
- Release date: 28 January 1921
- Country: Germany
- Languages: Silent; German intertitles

The Bull of Olivera (German: Der Stier von Olivera) is a 1921 German silent historical drama film directed by Erich Schönfelder and starring Emil Jannings. It was shot at the Tempelhof Studios in Berlin. The film's art direction was by Kurt Richter. It premiered at the Ufa-Palast am Zoo.

== Cast ==
- Carl Ebert as Juana's fiancé Don Perez
- Emil Jannings as General François Guillaume
- Grete Lönsson as Juanita's maid Aminta
- Harry Nestor
- Albert Paulig as Corporal Poussin
- Karl Platen as De Barrios' servant Lopez
- Hanna Ralph as Donna Juana
- Karl Rückert as Bishop von Olivera
- Fritz Schulz as Don Manuel
- Ernst Stahl-Nachbaur as Lieutenant Herbaut
- Magnus Stifter as Knight Master Marchand
- Hannes Sturm as Marques de Barrios
- Ferdinand von Alten as Priest Antonius
- Desider Zador
- Heinrich Zahdor as Emperor Napoleon
- Max Zilzer
