= Today's Children (film) =

1922 film

- Directed by: Adolf E. Licho
- Written by: Alfred Fekete; Adolf E. Licho
- Starring: Paul Hartmann; Mady Christians; Ludwig Hartau
- Cinematography: Willy Gaebel
- Production company: Messter Film
- Distributed by: UFA
- Release date: 17 February 1922
- Country: Germany
- Languages: Silent; German intertitles

Today's Children (German: Kinder der Zeit) is a 1922 German silent film directed by Adolf E. Licho and starring Paul Hartmann, Mady Christians, and Ludwig Hartau.

== Cast ==
- Paul Hartmann
- Mady Christians
- Ludwig Hartau
- Paul Bildt
- Martha Angerstein-Licho
- Wilhelm Bendow
- Adolf E. Licho
- Georg H. Schnell
- Margarete Schön
- Richard Starnburg
- Hans Sternberg
- Leopold von Ledebur
- Hans Wallemer

== Bibliography ==
- Grange, William (2008). Cultural Chronicle of the Weimar Republic. Lanham, MD: Scarecrow Press. ISBN 978-0-8108-5967-8.
