= The Ring of Giuditta Foscari =

1917 film by Alfred Halm

- Directed by: Alfred Halm
- Written by: Alfred Halm
- Produced by: Paul Davidson
- Starring: Emil Jannings; Harry Liedtke; Erna Morena
- Production company: PAGU
- Release date: 8 October 1917
- Country: Germany
- Languages: Silent; German intertitles

The Ring of Giuditta Foscari (German: Der Ring der Giuditta Foscari) is a 1917 German silent film written and directed by Alfred Halm and starring Emil Jannings, Harry Liedtke, and Erna Morena. It was shot at the Tempelhof Studios in Berlin. The film's sets were designed by the art director Paul Leni.

== Cast ==
- Erna Morena as Giuditta Foscari
- Emil Jannings
- Harry Liedtke

== Bibliography ==
- Bock, Hans-Michael & Bergfelder, Tim. The Concise CineGraph. Encyclopedia of German Cinema. Berghahn Books, 2009.
