= The Three Dances of Mary Wilford =

1920 film directed by Robert Wiene

- Directed by: Robert Wiene
- Written by: Johannes Brandt; Robert Wiene
- Starring: Friedrich Feher; Erika Glässner; Ludwig Hartau
- Cinematography: Willy Gaebel
- Production company: Ungo-Film
- Release date: April 1920
- Country: Germany
- Languages: Silent; German intertitles

The Three Dances of Mary Wilford (German: Die drei Tänze der Mary Wilford) is a 1920 German silent drama film directed by Robert Wiene and starring Friedrich Feher, Erika Glässner and Ludwig Hartau. It is apparently a sequel to Director Léo Lasko's 1919 film, The Sinner (German: Die Sünderin).

== Cast ==
- Friedrich Feher
- Erika Glässner
- Ludwig Hartau
- Reinhold Köstlin
- Hermann Vallentin

== Bibliography ==
- Jung, Uli & Schatzberg, Walter. Beyond Caligari: The Films of Robert Wiene. Berghahn Books, 1999.
