= The Gallant King =

1920 film

- Film poster
- German: Der galante König
- Directed by: Alfred Halm
- Written by: Alfred Halm; Hermann von Schmeling
- Produced by: Leonhard Fanto
- Cinematography: Franz Meinecke; Georg Muschner
- Music by: Vizenz Reisner; Otto Schmid
- Production company: Messter Film
- Distributed by: UFA
- Release date: 5 November 1920
- Country: Germany
- Languages: Silent; German intertitles

The Gallant King (German: Der galante König) is a 1920 German silent historical drama film directed by Alfred Halm. It is based on the life of the eighteenth century monarch Augustus the Strong. His story was later made into a 1936 sound film Augustus the Strong.

== Cast ==
In alphabetical order

- Hendrik Appels as König Karl XII von Schweden
- Rudolf Basil as August der Starke
- Antonia Dietrich as Gräfin Cosel
- Arthur Dietze as Hofnarr
- Hugo Falke as Graf Nördling
- Lise Goetzen as Fatima
- Harry Halm as Moritz von Sachsen
- Ria Jende as Komödiantin Orzelcka
- Dora Kasan as Bürgermädchen Traute Gottschalk
- Charlotte Lier as Gräfin Esterle
- Lothar Mehnert as Mönch
- Alfred Meyer as Hofnarr
- Clara Salbach as Kurfürstin Mutter
- Rudolf Schröder as Staatsminister von Hoym
- Armin Seydelmann as Staatsminister Graf Beichling
- Eva Speyer as Gräfin Königsmark
- Paul Wiecke as König von Rom
- Alexander Wirth as Graf von Reckwitz
