= Tartuffe (1926 film) =

1926 film by F. W. Murnau

Tartuffe Herr Tartüff
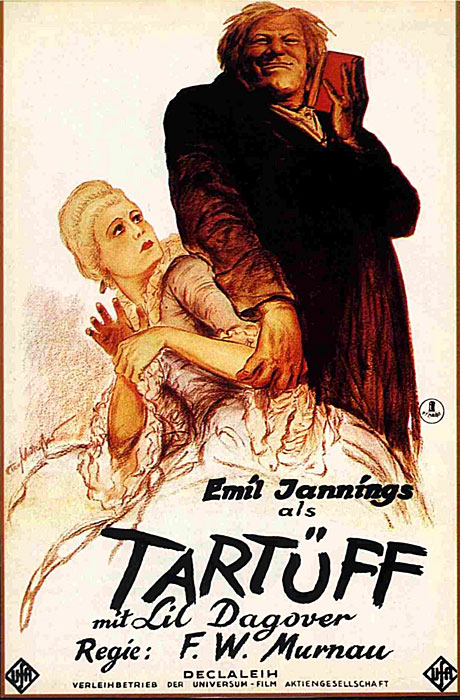
- Film poster
- Directed by: F. W. Murnau
- Written by: Carl Mayer
- Based on: Tartuffe by Molière
- Produced by: Erich Pommer
- Starring: Hermann Picha; Rosa Valetti; Werner Krauss; Lil Dagover; Lucie Höflich; Emil Jannings
- Cinematography: Karl W. Freund
- Music by: Giuseppe Becce
- Distributed by: UFA
- Release dates: 25 January 1926 (Germany); 24 July 1927 (U.S.)
- Running time: 4 reels, c. 65 mins
- Country: Weimar Republic
- Languages: Silent film; German intertitles

Tartuffe (1926) by F. W. Murnau

Tartuffe (German: Tartüff) is a German silent film produced by Erich Pommer for UFA and released in 1926. It was directed by F. W. Murnau, photographed by Karl Freund and written by Carl Mayer from Molière's original play. It was shot at the Tempelhof Studios in Berlin. Set design and costumes were by Robert Herlth and Walter Röhrig.

The film stars Emil Jannings as Tartuffe, Lil Dagover as Elmire and Werner Krauss as Orgon.

Based on the play Tartuffe, the film retains the basic plot, but Murnau and Mayer pared down Molière's play, eliminating most of the secondary characters and concentrating on the triangle of Orgon, Elmire and Tartuffe. They also introduced a framing device, whereby the story of Tartuffe becomes a film-within-a-film, shown by a young actor as a device to warn his grandfather about his unctuous but evil housekeeper.

== Plot ==
A wealthy old man is cared for by his housekeeper. She covets his fortune, and persistently tries to convince him to name her, rather than his grandson, in his will. Through intrigue, she succeeds. To get her hands on the inheritance, she then begins to slowly poison the old man.

The grandson becomes suspicious but cannot get access to his grandfather to warn him. However, it turns out that his choice of acting as a profession is advantageous. He disguises himself as a traveling cinema operator and pulls up in front of his grandfather's house. At first, the housekeeper tries to turn him away, but his charm persuades her to let him hold a screening in the house. The film shown is Tartuffe, a story about a hypocrite and the all-too-easy belief in him. The hypocrite in the film is exposed, and the same fate befalls the housekeeper after the screening: she is thrown out, and grandfather and grandson embrace. According to the film, hypocrites can therefore also be called Tartuffe.

== Cast ==
- Emil Jannings – Herr Tartüff
- Werner Krauss – Herr Orgon
- Lil Dagover – Elmire, Orgon's wife
- Hermann Picha – old councilor
- Rosa Valetti – housekeeper
- André Mattoni – grandson
- Lucie Höflich – Dorine

== Restoration and home video ==
Like all Murnau's surviving films, Tartuffe is licensed by the Friedrich Wilhelm Murnau Foundation, whose tinted restoration is distributed on home video with a piano score by Javier Pérez de Azpeitia. It has been released on DVD in the US (Kino Lorber) and in identical editions in the UK (Eureka/Masters of Cinema), France (mk2), Germany (Universum Film) and Spain (Divisa). The FWMS restoration has also been released on Blu-ray in the UK by Eureka/MoC.

In 2015, a new, longer and more accurate restoration with a full orchestral score was broadcast on Arte television, and as of April 2020 it is available on home video only in the U.S. via Kino Lorber’s Blu-ray reissue.

== Legacy ==
In retrospective reviews, critics commented on the film's mise-en-scene and praised the performances. Several critics noted the rarity of a comedy directed by Murnau, who was famous for the expressionist dramas. Its humorous storyline and happy ending has rendered it a minor work in Murnau's filmography and has led film critic Jonathan Rosenbaum to call it "underrated."

== See also ==
- 1926 in film
- List of comedy films of the 1920s
- List of drama films of the 1920s
- List of UFA films
