= The Brothers Karamazov (1921 film) =

1921 film directed by Carl Froelich

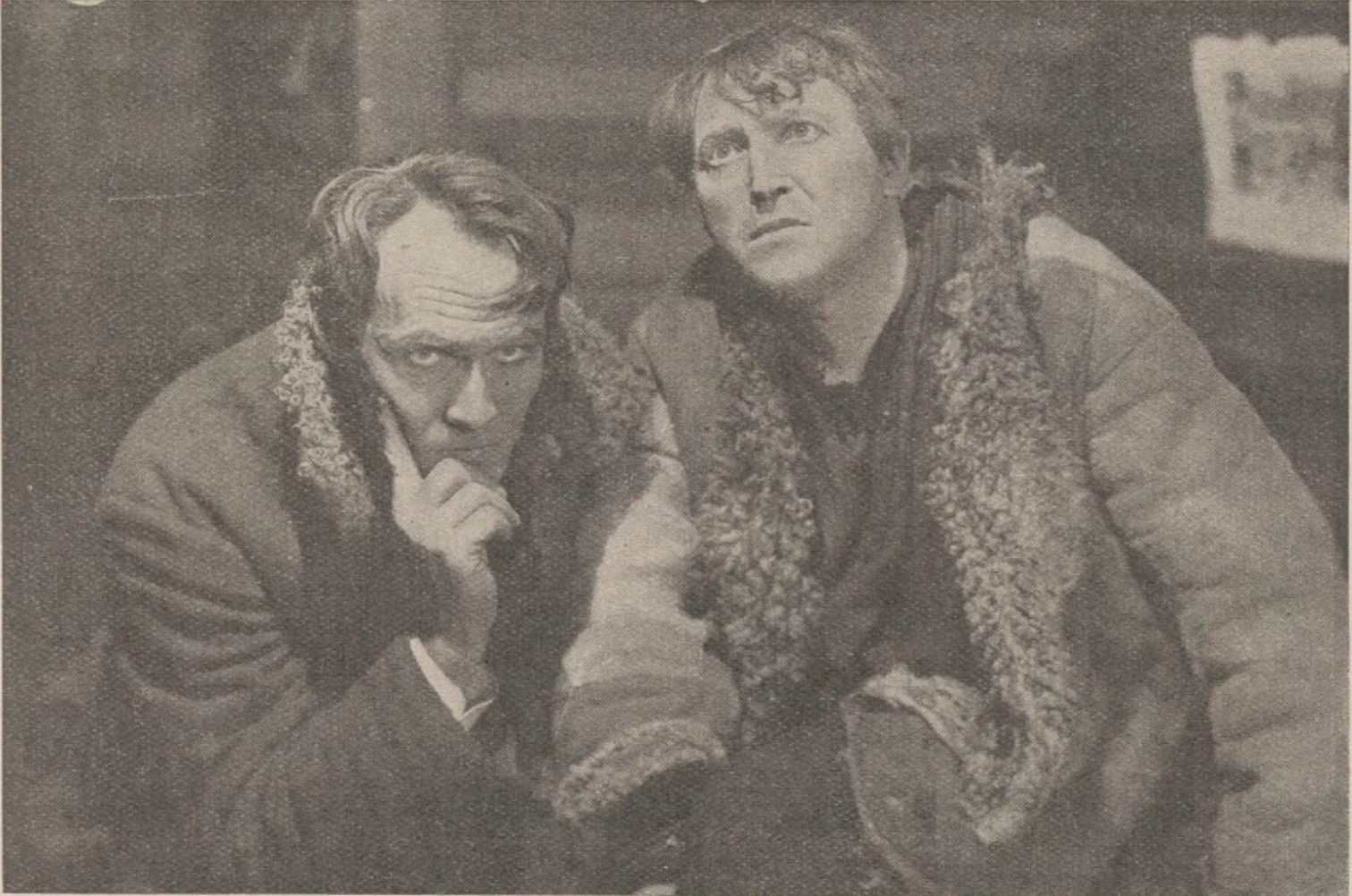
- German: Die Brüder Karamasoff
- Directed by: Carl Froelich; Dimitri Buchowetzki
- Based on: The Brothers Karamazov; 1880 novel by Fyodor Dostoevsky
- Produced by: Paul Ebner; Maxim Galitzenstein
- Starring: Fritz Kortner; Bernhard Goetzke; Emil Jannings; Werner Krauss
- Cinematography: Otto Tober
- Production company: Maxim-Film
- Distributed by: UFA
- Release date: 20 July 1921
- Running time: 70 minutes
- Country: Germany
- Languages: Silent; German intertitles

The Brothers Karamazov (German: Die Brüder Karamasoff) is a 1921 German silent drama film directed by Carl Froelich and an uncredited Dimitri Buchowetzki and starring Fritz Kortner, Bernhard Goetzke, and Emil Jannings. It is an adaptation of the 1880 novel The Brothers Karamazov by Fyodor Dostoevsky.

== Cast ==
- Fritz Kortner as Der alte Karamasoff
- Bernhard Goetzke as Iwan
- Emil Jannings as Dimitri Karamasoff
- Werner Krauss as Smerdjakoff
- Hermann Thimig as Alexej
- Hugo Froelich as Gregori
- Alina Gryficz-Mielewska as Gruschenka
- Hanna Ralph as Katarina
- Rudolf Lettinger as Oberst
- Josefine Dora as Generalin
- Irmgard Bern as Agaffia
- Lili Donecker as Lisawetta
- Paul Kaufmann
- Dolly Eichelberg
- Dimitri Buchowetzki
