= Othello (1922 film) =

1922 film directed by Dimitri Buchowetzki

- Directed by: Dimitri Buchowetzki
- Written by: Dimitri Buchowetzki; Carl Hagen
- Based on: Othello by William Shakespeare
- Starring: Emil Jannings; Werner Krauss; Ica von Lenkeffy; Theodor Loos
- Cinematography: Karl Hasselmann; Friedrich Paulmann
- Production company: Wörner-Filmgesellschaft
- Distributed by: UFA
- Release date: February 1922
- Running time: 79 minutes
- Country: Weimar Republic
- Languages: Silent; German intertitles

Othello is a 1922 German silent historical romantic drama film directed by Dimitri Buchowetzki, and starring Emil Jannings, Werner Krauss and Ica von Lenkeffy. It was based on William Shakespeare's play The Tragedy of Othello, the Moor of Venice, the first of six major film adaptations of the work. It was shot at the Johannisthal Studios in Berlin. The film's sets were designed by the art director Karl Machus.

== Cast ==
- Emil Jannings as Othello
- Werner Krauss as Iago
- Ica von Lenkeffy as Desdemona
- Theodor Loos as Cassio
- Ferdinand von Alten as Rodrigo
- Friedrich Kühne as Brabantio
- Magnus Stifter as Montano
- Lya De Putti as Emilia
- Ludwig Rex

== Home media ==
The film was released on DVD on 19 June 2001.

== Bibliography ==
- Hadfield, Andrew. A Routledge Literary Sourcebook on William Shakespeare's Othello. Routledge, 2003.
- Kreimeier, Klaus. The Ufa Story: A History of Germany's Greatest Film Company, 1918–1945. University of California Press, 1999.
