= Danton (1921 film) =

1921 film directed by Dimitri Buchowetzki

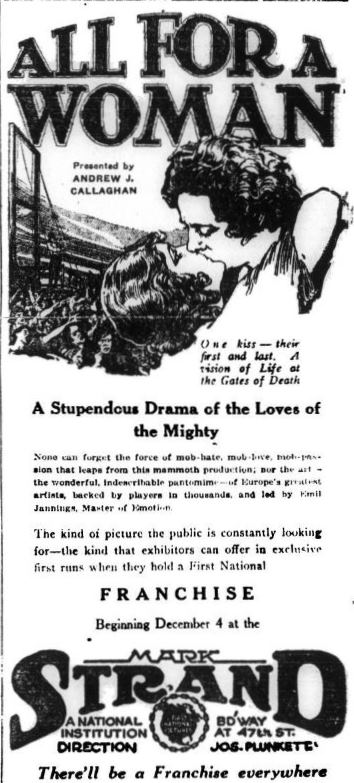
- American advertisement, under its U.S. release title All for a Woman
- Directed by: Dimitri Buchowetzki
- Written by: Johnstone Craig; Carl Mayer; Dimitri Buchowetzki
- Based on: Danton's Death; 1835 play by Georg Büchner
- Produced by: Hilde Woerner
- Starring: Emil Jannings; Werner Krauss; Ossip Runitsch; Ferdinand von Alten
- Cinematography: Arpad Viragh
- Production company: Wörner-Filmgesellschaft
- Distributed by: UFA
- Release date: 4 May 1921
- Running time: 60 minutes
- Country: Germany
- Language: Silent (German intertitles)

Danton is a 1921 German silent historical film directed by Dimitri Buchowetzki and starring Emil Jannings, Werner Krauss and Ossip Runitsch. The film was shot at the Johannisthal Studios in Berlin. It premiered at the Ufa-Palast am Zoo in the city on 4 May 1921. It was based on the 1835 play Danton's Death by Georg Büchner.

== Synopsis ==
At the height of the Reign of Terror, Maximilien Robespierre orchestrates the trial and execution of several of his fellow leading French revolutionaries including Georges Danton.

== Cast ==
- Emil Jannings as Danton
- Werner Krauss as Robespierre
- Ossip Runitsch as Desmoulins
- Ferdinand von Alten as Herault-Séchelles
- Eduard von Winterstein as Gen. Westermann
- Charlotte Ander as Lucile Desmoulins
- Maly Delschaft as Julia
- Hilde Wörner as Babette
- Hugo Döblin as Henriot
- Friedrich Kühne as Fouquier-Tinville
- Robert Scholz as St. Just
- Hans Dreier
- Albert Florath

== Bibliography ==
- Grange, William (2008). Cultural Chronicle of the Weimar Republic. Lanham, MD: Scarecrow Press. ISBN 978-0-8108-5967-8.
