= Dimitri Buchowetzki =

Russian film director

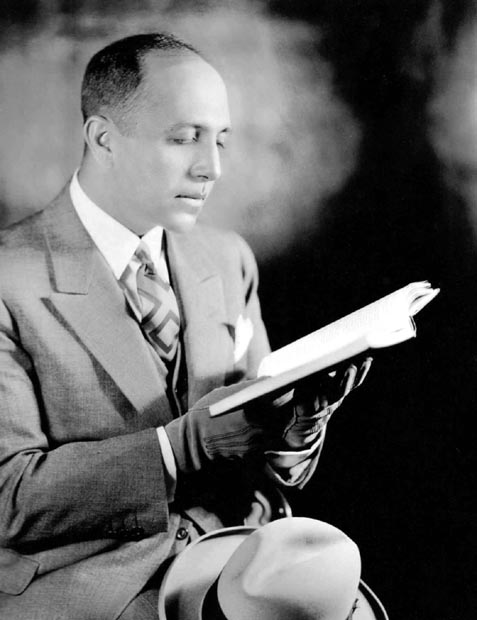
- Born: Dmitry Savelyevych Bukhovecky; 1885; Russian Empire
- Died: 1932 (aged 46–47); Los Angeles, California; United States
- Occupations: Film director Film actor screenwriter
- Years active: 1918 - 1931

Dimitri Buchowetzki (1885–1932), born Dmitry Savelyevych Bukhovecky, was a Russian film director, screenwriter, and actor in Germany, Sweden, United States, United Kingdom, and France.

== Life and career ==
Initially Buchowetzki studied law. Later he starred in a number of silent films, mostly playing antagonistic characters, including Yakov Protazanov’s melodramas Giant of the Spirit (1918) and Maidservant Jenny (1918). He played the hussar officer Minski in Aleksandr Ivanovski’s Pushkin adaptation The Stationmaster (1918) and appeared in the title role of Aleksandr Razumnyi’s pro-Bolshevik film Comrade Abram (1919). In 1919, Buchowetzki immigrated to Germany, via Poland, where he directed his most artistic works: the expressionistic Fedor Dostoevsky adaptation The Brothers Karamazov (1921), the historical drama Danton (1921, based on Georg Büchner’s play), and Othello (1922), all starring Emil Jannings. Bukhovetski also made high-budget period pictures such as Peter the Great (1922). Pola Negri, whom Buchowetzki had directed in the German-made Sappho (1924), invited him to Hollywood, where he directed her in a series of erotic melodramas, including Men (1924), Lily of the Dust (1926), and The Crown of Lies (1926).

Buchowetzki began work at MGM on Love (1927) with Greta Garbo and Ricardo Cortez. However, producer Irving Thalberg was unhappy with the early filming, and replaced Buchowetzki with Edmund Goulding, cinematographer Merritt B. Gerstad with William H. Daniels, and Cortez with John Gilbert.

== Selected filmography ==
Director

- Anita Jo (1919)
- The Last Hour (Germany, 1921)
- The Experiment of Professor Mithrany (Germany, 1921)
- Country Roads and the Big City (Germany 1921)
- Symphony of Death (Germany, 1921)
- Danton (Germany, 1921) with Emil Jannings, Werner Krauss, and Conrad Veidt
- Sappho (Germany, 1921) released by Samuel Goldwyn in the US in 1923 as Mad Love, with Pola Negri
- The Brothers Karamazov (Germany, 1921) co-director; with Emil Jannings
- Peter der Große (Germany, 1922) with Emil Jannings
- Othello (Germany, 1922) with Emil Jannings and Werner Krauss
- The Vice of Gambling (1923, Germany)
- Carousel (Sweden, 1923)
- The Countess of Paris (1923)
- Men (1924) with Pola Negri
- Lily of the Dust (1924) with Pola Negri
- The Swan (1925) with Frances Howard
- Graustark (1925) with Norma Talmadge
- Valencia (1926) with Mae Murray
- The Midnight Sun (1926) with Laura La Plante
- The Crown of Lies (1926) with Pola Negri
- The Indictment (1931) French-language version of Manslaughter (1930)
- The Night of Decision (1931) German-language version of The Virtuous Sin (1930)
- Woman in the Jungle (1931) German-language version of The Letter (1929)
- De Sensatie van de Toekomst (1931) co-director of Dutch version of Paramount film Television
- Magie moderne (1931) co-director with Charles de Rochefort of French version of Television
- Stamboul (UK, 1932), also Spanish-language version El hombre que asesino

Screenwriter

- The Bull of Olivera (1921)
