= Rose Bernd (1919 film) =

1919 film

- Directed by: Alfred Halm
- Written by: Alfred Halm; Gerhart Hauptmann (play)
- Starring: Henny Porten; Emil Jannings; Werner Krauss
- Cinematography: Willy Gaebel
- Music by: Giuseppe Becce
- Production company: Messter Film
- Distributed by: UFA
- Release date: 5 October 1919
- Running time: 70 minutes
- Country: Germany
- Languages: Silent; German intertitles

Rose Bernd is a 1919 German silent drama film directed by Alfred Halm and starring Henny Porten and Emil Jannings. It is based on the play of the same name by Gerhart Hauptmann. Porten won critical acclaim for her role in the film.

== Cast ==
In alphabetical order

- Rudolf Biebrach as Untersuchungsrichter
- Paul Bildt as August Keil
- Ilka Grüning as Frau Flamm
- Emil Jannings as Arthur Streckmann
- Werner Krauss as Der alte Bernd
- Max Maximilian
- Henny Porten as Rose Bernd
- Rigmore Toersleff as Martelli
- Alexander Wirth as Christoph Flamm

== Bibliography ==
- Hans-Michael Bock and Tim Bergfelder. The Concise Cinegraph: An Encyclopedia of German Cinema. Berghahn Books.
