= Emil Jannings =

German actor (1884–1950)

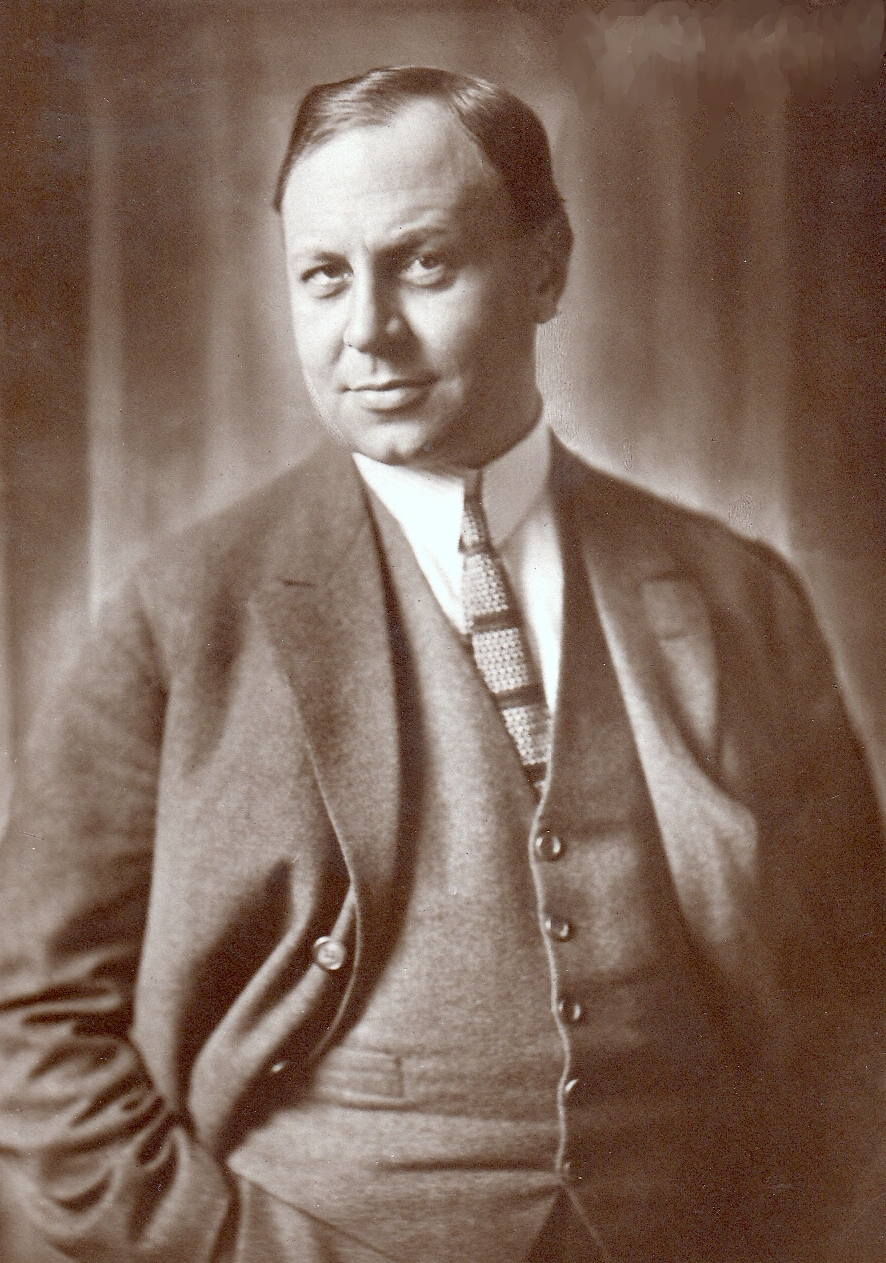
- Jannings c. 1926
- Born: Theodor Friedrich Emil Janenz; 23 July 1884; Rorschach, Switzerland
- Died: 2 January 1950 (aged 65); Strobl, Allied-occupied Austria
- Occupation: Actor
- Years active: 1914–1945
- Spouses: Lucy Höfling (divorced 1919); Hanna Ralph (m. 1919; div. 1921) Lucie Höflich (m. 1921; div. 1921) Gussy Holl (m. 1923)
- Children: 1

Signature
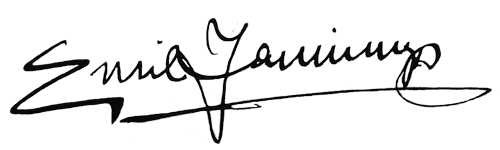

Emil Jannings (born Theodor Friedrich Emil Janenz; 23 July 1884 – 2 January 1950) was a Swiss-born German actor who was popular in Hollywood films in the 1920s. He was the first recipient of the Academy Award for Best Actor for starring in The Last Command and The Way of All Flesh. Jannings remains the only German ever to win in that category.

He is best known for his films with F. W. Murnau and Josef von Sternberg, including 1930's The Blue Angel (Der blaue Engel), with Marlene Dietrich. The Blue Angel was meant as a vehicle for Jannings to secure a place for himself in the new medium of sound film, but he was ultimately overshadowed by Dietrich. Jannings went on to leading roles in State Films (Staatsauftragsfilme) in Nazi Germany.

== Early life ==
Jannings was born in Rorschach, Switzerland, the son of Emil Janenz, an American businessman from St. Louis, and his wife Margarethe (née Schwabe), originally from Germany. Jannings held German citizenship; while he was still young the family moved to Leipzig in the German Empire and further to Görlitz after the early death of his father.

Jannings ran away from school and went to sea. When he returned to Görlitz, his mother finally allowed him to begin a traineeship at the local theatre, starting his stage career. From 1901 onwards he worked with several theatre companies in Bremen, Nuremberg, Leipzig, Königsberg, and Glogau before joining the Deutsches Theater ensemble under director Max Reinhardt in Berlin. Permanently employed from 1915, Jannings met with playwright Karl Vollmöller, fellow actor Ernst Lubitsch, and photographer Frieda Riess, who after World War I, were contributors of Weimar Culture in 1920s Berlin. Jannings' breakthrough was in 1918 with his role as Judge Adam in Kleist's Broken Jug at the Schauspielhaus.

== Career ==
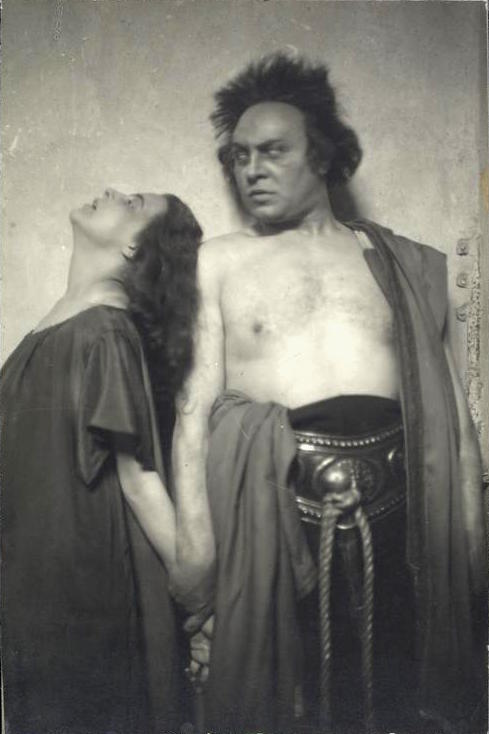
Jannings as Kreon in Hasenclever's Antigone, Großes Schauspielhaus, 1920

Jannings was a theatre actor who went into films but remained dissatisfied with the limited expressive possibilities in the silent era. Having signed with UFA, he starred in Die Augen der Mumie Ma (The Eyes of the Mummy, 1918) and Madame Dubarry (1919), both with Pola Negri opposite him. He also performed in the 1922 film version of Othello and in F. W. Murnau's 1924 film The Last Laugh (Der Letzte Mann), as a proud but aged hotel doorman who is demoted to a washroom attendant. Jannings worked with Murnau on two other films, taking on the title role in Tartuffe (Herr Tartüff, 1925), and as Mephistopheles in Faust (1926).

=== United States ===
His increasing popularity enabled Jannings to sign with Paramount Pictures and eventually follow Negri and Lubitsch to Hollywood. His first American film, The Way of All Flesh, directed by Victor Fleming, now lost, was released in 1927, and in the following year he performed in Josef von Sternberg's The Last Command. In 1929, Jannings won the first Best Actor Oscar for his work in both films. He also made Street of Sin (Mauritz Stiller, 1928).

Jannings was dubbed in Lubitsch's part-talkie The Patriot (1928), although his own voice was restored after Jannings objected. In Europe, he starred opposite Marlene Dietrich in 1930's The Blue Angel, which was filmed simultaneously in English and in German Der blaue Engel. Jannings' thick German accent was difficult to understand, ending his American career.

According to Susan Orlean, author of Rin Tin Tin: The Life and The Legend, Jannings was not actually the winner of the first best actor award, but the runner-up. While researching her book, Orlean thought she discovered that it was in fact Rin Tin Tin, the German Shepherd dog, one of the biggest movie stars of the day, who won the vote. The Academy, however, worried about not being taken seriously if the first Oscar went to a dog, awarded the trophy to the runner-up. However, this claim is otherwise unverified and labelled as untrue by most sources.

In 1960, Jannings was posthumously honored with a star on the Hollywood Walk of Fame at 1630 Vine Street for his contributions to motion pictures.

=== Nazi Germany ===
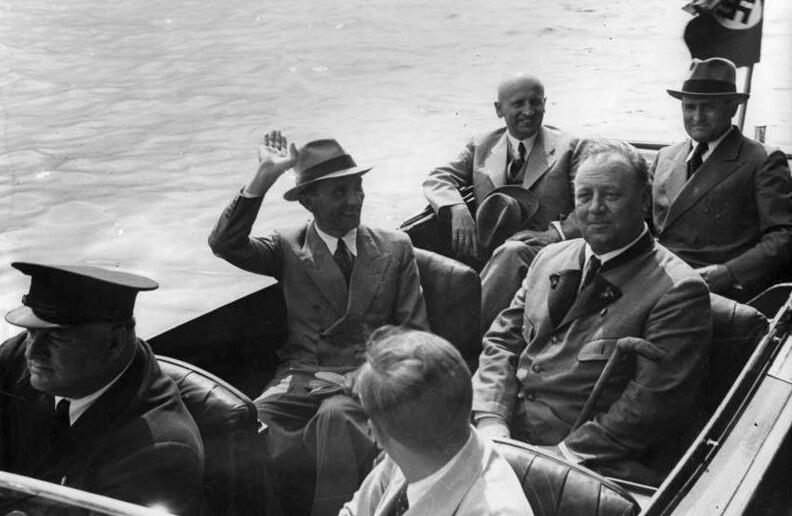
Jannings with Joseph Goebbels on Wolfgangsee, 1938

After the Nazi seizure of power in 1933, Jannings stayed on, prolonging his career by making State Films. He starred in several films promoting Nazism, in particular the Führerprinzip by presenting unyielding historical characters, in Der alte und der junge König (The Old and the Young King, 1934), Der Herrscher (The Ruler, 1937) directed by Veit Harlan, Robert Koch (1939), Ohm Krüger (Uncle Kruger, 1941), and Die Entlassung (The Dismissal, 1942). He also took part in The Broken Jug directed by Gustav Ucicky. For his work in Nazi Cinema, Minister of Propaganda Joseph Goebbels named Jannings an "Artist of the State" (Staatsschauspieler)

The filming of Wo ist Herr Belling? was aborted when troops of the Allied Powers entered Germany in 1945. Jannings reportedly carried his Oscar statuette as proof of his ties to America. His substantial association with Nazi propaganda left him subject to denazification. Other actors resumed their careers, but Jannings never worked as an actor again.

As his former co-star Marlene Dietrich became a US citizen and influential anti-Nazi activist, spending much of the war entertaining troops on the front lines and broadcasting on behalf of the OSS, she particularly loathed Jannings for his Nazi ties, terming her former co-star a "ham".

=== Death ===
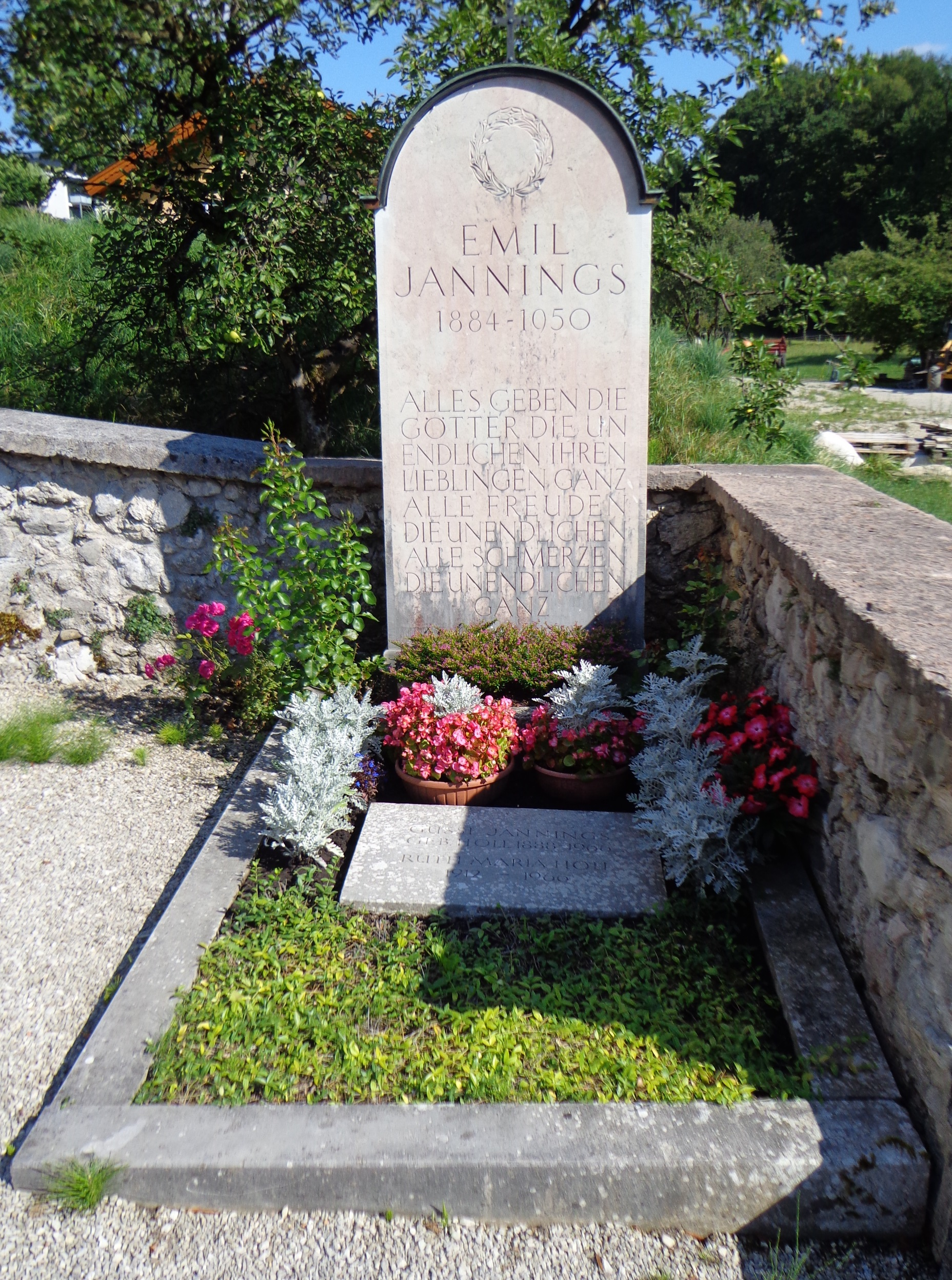
Emil Jannings' grave at St Wolfgang im Salzkammergut

Jannings retired to Strobl near Salzburg, Austria, and became an Austrian citizen in 1947. He died in 1950, aged 65, from liver cancer. He is buried in the St. Wolfgang cemetery. His Best Actor Oscar is displayed at the Berlin Filmmuseum.

== Marriages ==
Jannings was married four times. His first three marriages ended in divorce, his last with his death. His last three marriages were to German stage and film actresses, Hanna Ralph, Lucie Höflich, and Gussy Holl. He had a daughter, Ruth-Maria (born 1920), from his first marriage to Lucy Höflich.

== Cultural depictions ==
- Hilmar Eichhorn portrayed a fictionalized version of Jannings in Inglourious Basterds (2009), directed by Quentin Tarantino. This fictional Jannings dies at the end of the film.
- In 1972's Cabaret, singer Sally Bowles (Liza Minnelli) finds herself at a high-society dinner party; she tries to impress by suggesting that she is friendly with Emil Jannings.
- In Series 1 of the BBC's epic Second World War drama World on Fire (2019) American journalist Nancy Campbell, played by Helen Hunt, accepts an invitation from neighbours in Berlin to see the latest Emil Jannings film, saying: “Well, I love Emil Jannings, and I loved him in The Blue Angel.”

== Filmography ==
Year	Title	Role	Notes
1914	Arme Eva		
1914	Im Schützengraben	Extra	
1914	Passionels Tagebuch		
1916	Aus Mangel an Beweisen	Dr. Langer	
1916	Die Bettlerin von St. Marien	Baron Gelsburg	
1916	Frau Eva		
1916	Im Angesicht des Toten	Paul Werner	
1916	Life Is a Dream	Verführer (the seducer)	a.k.a. Das Leben ein Traum (German original title)
1916	A Night of Horror	Banker	a.k.a. Nächte des Grauens (German original title)
1916	Stein unter Steinen		
1917	Das fidele Gefängnis	Quabbe, the jailer	The Merry Jail (Europe: English title)
1917	When Four Do the Same	Segetoff	a.k.a. Wenn vier dasselbe tun (German original title)
1917	Hoheit Radieschen		
1917	The Marriage of Luise Rohrbach	Wilhelm Rohrbach	a.k.a. Die Ehe der Luise Rohrbach (German original title)
1917	Der Zehnte Pavillon der Zitadelle		
1917	Das Geschäft	S. H. Haßler	
1917	Lulu		
1917	The Ring of Giuditta Foscari		a.k.a. Der Ring der Giuditta Foscari (German original title)
1917	The Sea Battle		a.k.a. Die Seeschlacht (German original title)
1917	Unheilbar		
1918	The Seeds of Life	James Fraenkel, stock exchange broker (Börsenmakler); John Smith, American engineer (amerikanischer Ingenieur)	a.k.a. Keimendes Leben (German original title)
1918	The Eyes of the Mummy	Radu, an Arab	Die Augen der Mumie Ma (German original title)
1918	Fuhrmann Henschel		
1918	Nach zwanzig Jahren	Horst Lundin 'Korn'	
1919	Rose Bernd	Arthur Streckmann	
1919	Madame Dubarry	Louis XV	a.k.a. Passion
1919	Vendetta	Tomasso	
1919	The Daughter of Mehemed	Vaco Juan Riberda, Fabrikbesitzer	a.k.a. Die Tochter des Mehemed (German original title)
1919	The Man of Action	Jan Miller	a.k.a. Der Mann der Tat (German original title)
1920	Colombine	Carlo	a.k.a. Die Braut des Apachen (German original title)
1920	Anna Boleyn	Henry VIII	a.k.a. Deception
1920	The Skull of Pharaoh's Daughter	Osorcon, Pharao of Egypt	a.k.a. Der Schädel der Pharaonentochter (German original title)
1920	Algol	Robert Herne	
1920	The Big Light	Lorenz Ferleitner	a.k.a. Das große Licht (German original title)
1920	Kohlhiesel's Daughters	Peter Xaver	a.k.a. Kohlhiesels Töchter (German original title)
1921	The Rats	Bruno	a.k.a. Die Ratten (German original title)
1921	The Oath of Peter Hergatz		a.k.a. Der Schwur des Peter Hergatz (German original title)
1921	Danton	Georges Danton	a.k.a. All for a Woman
1921	The Bull of Olivera	General François Guillaume	a.k.a. Der Stier von Olivera (German original title)
1921	The Brothers Karamazov	Dimitri Karamasoff	a.k.a. Die Brüder Karamasoff (German original title)
1922	Peter the Great	Peter the Great	a.k.a. Peter der Große (German original title)
1922	Othello	Othello	
1922	The Loves of Pharaoh	Pharao Amenes	a.k.a. Das Weib des Pharao (German original title)
1922	The Countess of Paris	Ombrade	a.k.a. Die Gräfin von Paris (German original title)
1923	All for Money	S. I. Rupp	(USA); a.k.a. Alles für Geld (German original title)
1923	Tragedy of Love	Ombrade	a.k.a. Tragödie der Liebe (German original title)
1924	The Last Laugh	Hotel Porter	(USA); a.k.a. Der letzte Mann (German original title)
1924	Husbands or Lovers	Husband	
1924	Waxworks	Harun al-Rashid	
1924	Quo Vadis	Nero	Extant
1925	Variety	Boss Huller	a.k.a. Jealousy (USA)
1925	Love is Blind	Emil Jannings	
1926	Tartuffe	Tartuffe	
1926	Faust – A German Folktale	Mephisto	Extant
1927	The Way of All Flesh	August Schilling	Academy Award for Best Actor; Lost film
1928	Sins of the Fathers	Wilhelm Spengler	excerpts and clips are preserved of this film. Unconfirmed about the total film
1928	The Patriot	Czar Paul I	Lost film
1928	The Street of Sin	Basher Bill	Lost film
1928	The Last Command	Gen. Dolgorucki / Grand Duke Sergius Alexander	Academy Award for Best Actor; Extant
1929	Betrayal	Poldi Moser	
1930	Darling of the Gods	Albert Winkelmann	a.k.a. Liebling der Götter (German original title)
1930	The Blue Angel	Prof. Immanuel Rath	US title; a.k.a. Der blaue Engel
1932	Storms of Passion	Gustav Bumke	German original title; a.k.a. Stürme der Leidenschaft a.k.a. Tempest
1933	Die Abenteuer des Königs Pausole	King Pausole	a.k.a. The Adventures of King Pausole (English title)
1933	The Merry Monarch	King Pausole	
1934	Der Schwarze Walfisch	Peter Petersen	German original title; a.k.a. The Black Whale (International: English title)
1935	The Old and the Young King	Frederick William I of Prussia	a.k.a. The Making of a King (USA); Der alte und der junge König (German original title)
1936	The Dreamer	Direktor Prof. Niemeyer	a.k.a. Traumulus (German original title)
1937	The Broken Jug	Adam, Dorfrichter	a.k.a. Der zerbrochene Krug (German original title)
1937	The Ruler	Matthias Clausen	a.k.a. Der Herrscher (German original title)
1939	Robert Koch	Robert Koch	
1939	Der Trichter. (Nr. III)		scenes deleted
1941	Ohm Krüger	Paul Kruger	a.k.a. Uncle Kruger (International: English title)
1942	Die Entlassung	Otto von Bismarck	a.k.a. Bismarck's Dismissal (UK)
1943	An Old Heart Becomes Young Again	Fabrikdirektor Hoffmann	Altes Herz wird wieder jung (German original title)
1945	Wo ist Herr Belling?	Firmenchef Eberhard Belling	a.k.a. Where Is Mr. Belling? (English title)

== See also ==
- List of German-speaking Academy Award winners and nominees
- List of actors with Academy Award nominations
