= 1905 in literature =

This article contains information about the literary events and publications of 1905.

== Events ==
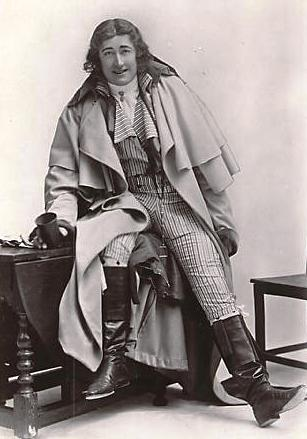
Fred Terry as Sir Percy Blakeney, The Scarlet Pimpernel in the 1905 West End theatre production of The Scarlet Pimpernel

- January – The All-Story Magazine, a pulp magazine, is founded in the United States and published by Frank Munsey.
- January–September – L. Frank Baum's Animal Fairy Tales appear in The Delineator magazine.
- January 5 – Baroness Emma Orczy's play The Scarlet Pimpernel, adapted by Julia Neilson and Fred Terry, who play the leads, makes its London debut at the New Theatre, followed shortly by publication of the novel.
- January 16 – Neil Munro begins publishing his Vital Spark stories in the Glasgow Evening News.
- February – Upton Sinclair's novel The Jungle begins serialization in the American socialist newspaper Appeal to Reason.
- May 10 – The first stage performance in England of Oscar Wilde's tragedy Salome (the original version having been banned in 1892) takes place privately at the New Stage Club of the Bijou Theatre, Victoria Hall, Archer Street, Westbourne Grove, London, with Millicent Murby in the title role, directed by Florence Farr. The author died in 1900.
- July – Beatrix Potter becomes engaged to her editor Norman Warne, but on August 25 he dies unexpectedly of pernicious anemia. Soon after she completes the purchase of a Lake District home, Hill Top.
- July 15 – Popular fictional gentleman thief Arsène Lupin is introduced by Maurice Leblanc in the first of a series of short stories serialized in the French magazine Je sais tout, "The Arrest of Arsène Lupin".
- October 13 – The English actor-manager Sir Henry Irving collapses in his hotel, while playing Thomas Becket on tour in Bradford, dying soon afterwards.
- October 15 – The weekly full-color comic strip Little Nemo in Slumberland, by Winsor McCay, makes its first appearance in the New York Herald.
- December 10 – O. Henry's short story "The Gift of the Magi" first appears as "Gifts of the Magi" in The New York Sunday World.
- December 15 – Pushkin House is founded in Saint Petersburg, Russia, to preserve the heritage of Alexander Pushkin.
- unknown dates
  - The first of many chapters of I Am a Cat (吾輩は猫である) by Natsume Sōseki is published serially in Hototogisu (ホトトギス, Lesser cuckoo). It begins in military style: "I, sir, am a cat, though as yet I have no name...." and explores a family in which the English-teacher husband cannot speak English.
  - The group Noor-Eesti (Young Estonia) is formed to promote Estonian national awakening in language and literature.
  - The National Library of Thailand is created as the Vajirayanana Library for the Capital City in Bangkok, with the merger of the Mandira Dharma Vajirayanana and Buddhasasana Sangaha libraries by royal decree.
  - Belle da Costa Greene, aged 22, is appointed as librarian to J. P. Morgan in New York City.

== New books ==
=== Fiction ===
- Edwin Lester Arnold – Lieut. Gullivar Jones: His Vacation
- Margarete Böhme – Tagebuch einer Verlorenen (Diary of a Lost Girl)
- Rhoda Broughton – A Waif's Progress
- Willa Cather – The Troll Garden
- Mary Boykin Chesnut – A Diary from Dixie
- G. K. Chesterton – The Club of Queer Trades (book publication)
- Marquis de Sade (d. 1814) – The 120 Days of Sodom (Les 120 journées de Sodome, written 1785)
- Catherine Isabella Dodd – A Vagrant Englishwoman
- Arthur Conan Doyle – The Return of Sherlock Holmes (stories collected in book format)
- Lord Dunsany – The Gods of Pegāna
- Antonio Fogazzaro – Il Santo (The Saint)
- E. M. Forster – Where Angels Fear to Tread
- Tom Gallon – Meg the Lady
- Robert Hichens – The Garden of Allah
- W. H. Hudson – A Little Boy Lost
- W. J. Locke – The Morals of Marcus Ordeyne
- Leopoldo Lugones – La Guerra Gaucha (The Gaucho War)
- Heinrich Mann – Professor Unrat
- George Moore – The Lake
- Baroness Orczy
  - The Scarlet Pimpernel
  - The Case of Miss Elliot
  - By the Gods Beloved
- Dorothy Richardson (anonymously) – The Long Day: The Story of a New York Working Girl, As Told by Herself
- Hjalmar Söderberg – Doctor Glas
- Katherine Thurston – The Gambler
- Mark Twain – King Leopold's Soliloquy
- Jules Verne
  - Invasion of the Sea (L'Invasion de la mer)
  - The Lighthouse at the End of the World (Le Phare du bout du monde)
- Elizabeth von Arnim – Princess Priscilla's Fortnight
- Mary Augusta Ward – The Marriage of William Ashe
- H. G. Wells – Kipps
- Edith Wharton – The House of Mirth

=== Children and young people ===
- L. Frank Baum
  - Queen Zixi of Ix
  - The Fate of a Crown (as Schuyler Staunton)
- Angela Brazil – A Terrible Tomboy
- Frances Hodgson Burnett – A Little Princess
- H. E. Marshall – Our Island Story (history)
- Beatrix Potter
  - The Tale of Mrs. Tiggy-Winkle
  - The Tale of the Pie and the Patty-Pan
- Herbert Strang – Kobo: A Story of the Russo-Japanese War
- H. A. Vachell – The Hill
- Carolyn Wells – Patty in the City

=== Drama ===
- David Belasco – The Girl of the Golden West
- Jacinto Benavente – Rosas de otoño (Autumn Roses)
- Clyde Fitch – The Woman in the Case
- Maxim Gorky – Children of the Sun (Дети солнца, Deti solntsa)
- Harley Granville-Barker – The Voysey Inheritance
- Sacha Guitry
  - Le KWTZ
  - Nono
- Alois Jirásek – Lantern
- Rainis – Uguns un nakts (Fire and Night)
- George Bernard Shaw
  - Major Barbara
  - Man and Superman (first staged)
- J. M. Synge – The Well of the Saints
- Alfredo Testoni – Cardinal Lambertini
- Anthony E. Wills
  - All Charley's Fault
  - Liberty Corners

=== Poetry ===
- E. Clerihew Bentley – Biography for Beginners
- Gjergj Fishta – Lahuta e Malcís (The Highland Lute; begins publication)
- Sarojini Naidu – The Golden Threshold
- Rainer Maria Rilke – The Book of Hours (Das Stunden-Buch)
- Violet Teague – Night Fall in the Ti-Tree

=== Non-fiction ===
- Phan Bội Châu – Viet Nam vong quoc su
- G. K. Chesterton – Heretics
- Sigmund Freud – Three Essays on the Theory of Sexuality (Drei Abhandlungen zur Sexualtheorie)
- Afevork Ghevre Jesus – Grammatica della lingua amarica
- Mary Scharlieb – The Mother's Guide to the Health and Care of her Children
- Society of American Foresters – Proceedings of the Society of American Foresters (begins publication)
- University of Nevada – The University of Nevada Catalogue
- Max Weber – The Protestant Ethic and the Spirit of Capitalism (Die protestantische Ethik und der Geist des Kapitalismus)

== Births ==
- January 6 – Idris Davies, Anglo-Welsh poet (died 1953)
- January 21 – Wanda Wasilewska, Polish Soviet novelist and journalist (died 1964)
- January 25 – Margery Sharp, English novelist and children's writer (died 1991)
- January 31
  - Angelina Acuña, Guatemalan poet and author (died 2006)
  - John O'Hara, American writer (died 1970)
- February 2
  - John Davy Hayward, English literary editor and bibliophile (died 1965)
  - Ayn Rand (Alisa Zinov'yevna Rosenbaum), Russian-American novelist, playwright and screenwriter (died 1982)
- February 7 – Paul Nizan, French philosopher and writer (died 1940)
- February 15 (February 2 OS) – Musa Cälil, Soviet Tatar poet and resistance fighter (executed 1944)
- February 26 – Robert Byron, English travel writer (torpedoed 1941)
- March 2 – Geoffrey Grigson, English poet and critic (died 1985)
- March 23 – Joseph Henry Reason, African-American librarian (died 1997)
- April 30 – Leslie Paul, Anglo-Irish novelist (died 1985)
- May 1 – Emmanuel Mounier, French philosopher, journalist and theologian (died 1950)
- May 16 – H. E. Bates, English novelist (died 1974)
- May 20 – Gerrit Achterberg, Dutch poet (died 1962)
- May 24 – Mikhail Sholokhov, Soviet Russian novelist (died 1984)
- June 20 – Lillian Hellman, American dramatist (died 1984)
- June 21
  - Jacques Goddet, French sports journalist (died 2000)
  - Jean-Paul Sartre, French philosopher, novelist and playwright (died 1980)
- July 25
  - Elias Canetti, Bulgarian-born novelist and playwright writing in German (died 1994)
  - Denys Watkins-Pitchford, English children's writer (died 1990)
- August 14 – Ștefan Tita, Romanian polygraph and journalist activist (died 1977)
- September 4 – Mary Renault, British novelist (died 1983)
- September 5 – Arthur Koestler, Hungarian-born English novelist and social philosopher (suicide 1983)
- October 15 – C. P. Snow, English novelist (died 1980)
- October 17 – Lev Nussimbaum, Russian and Azerbaijani novelist (died 1942)
- October 31 – Elizabeth Jenkins, English author (died 2010)
- November 10 – Kurt Eggers, German writer, poet, songwriter and playwright (killed in action 1943)
- November 25 – Samiha Ayverdi, Turkish writer and Sufi mystic (died 1993)
- December 4 – Munro Leaf, American children's author (died 1974)
  - Vasily Grossman, Russian novelist and writer (died 1964)
- December 13 – Ann Barzel, American writer and dance critic (died 2007)
- December 21 – Anthony Powell, English novelist (died 2000)
- December 22 – Kenneth Rexroth, American poet and critic (died 1982)
- December 30 (December 17 OS) – Daniil Kharms, born Daniil Ivánovich Yuvatchov, Russian surrealist, children's writer, absurdist poet, short prose author and dramatist (died 1942)

== Deaths ==
- January 2 – Clara Augusta Jones Trask, American writer and dime novelist (born 1839)
- January 19 – Debendranath Tagore, Hindu philosopher and religious reformer (born 1817)
- January 21 – Clara Harrison Stranahan, American author; founder of Barnard College (born 1831)
- January 28 – Cordelia A. Greene, American physician, reformer, benefactor (born 1831)
- February 15 – Lew Wallace, American novelist and general (born 1827)
- February 26 – Marcel Schwob, French writer (pneumonia, born 1867)
- March 20 – Antonin Proust, French journalist and politician (born 1832)
- March 24 – Jules Verne, French novelist (born 1828)
- April 9 – Sarah Chauncey Woolsey (Susan Coolidge), American children's writer (born 1839)
- April 18 – Juan Valera y Alcalá-Galiano, Spanish realist novelist (born 1824)
- May 23 – Mary Livermore, American journalist and women's rights activist (born 1820)
- July 13 – Lisa Anne Fletcher, American poet, correspondent (born 1844)
- August 14 – Gertrude Bloede (Stuart Sterne), American poet (born 1845)
- August 22 – David Binning Monro, Scottish Homeric scholar (born 1836)
- September 18 – George MacDonald, Scottish poet, writer and minister (born 1824)
- October 3 – José-Maria de Heredia, French poet (born 1842)
- October 6 – Hibbard H. Shedd, American politician and novelist (born 1847)
- October 13 – Sir Henry Irving, English actor (born 1838)
- October 28 – Alphonse Allais, French humorist (born 1854)
- November 30 – Susannah V. Aldrich, American author and hymnwriter (born 1828)
- December 3 – John Bartlett, American lexicographer and publisher (born 1820)
- December 9 – Sir Richard Claverhouse Jebb, Scottish classicist and politician (born 1841)
- December 11 – Paul Meurice, French novelist and playwright (born 1818)
- December 12 – William Sharp, Scottish poet, biographer and novelist (born 1855)
- December 20 – Henry Harland (Sidney Luska), American novelist and editor (tuberculosis, born 1861)
- December 29 – Victor Daley (Creeve Roe), Australian poet (tuberculosis, born 1858)

== Awards ==
- Newdigate Prize: Arthur Robert Reade, "Garibaldi"
- Nobel Prize for Literature: Henryk Sienkiewicz
