= Ethel Colburn Mayne =

Irish writer, journalist and translator

- Born: Ethelind Frances Colburn Mayne; 7 January 1865; Johnstown, County Kilkenny, Ireland
- Died: 30 April 1941 (aged 76); Torquay, Devon, England
- Other names: Frances E. Huntley
- Occupations: Novelist; biographer; literary critic; translator
- Parents: Charlotte Emily Henrietta Sweetman; Charles Edward Bolton Mayne

Ethel Colburn Mayne (7 January 1865 – 30 April 1941) was an Irish novelist, short-story writer, biographer, literary critic, journalist and translator.

== Life ==
She was born in Johnstown in County Kilkenny in 1865, to Charlotte Emily Henrietta Mayne (née Sweetman) and Charles Edward Bolton Mayne. The family was originally from Monaghan. Her father was a member (from 1858) of the Royal Irish Constabulary. Her mother's father Captain William Sweetman was in the 16th Lancers. The family moved to Kinsale in County Cork and then to Cork, where her father was appointed a resident magistrate to the city.

She attended private schools in Ireland.

Mayne's first published work came when in 1895, aged 30, she submitted a short story to the recently established literary periodical The Yellow Book. The editor Henry Harland accepted it, writing her an effusive letter, and the story, "A Pen-and-ink Effect", appeared in July 1895 in Volume 6 of the periodical, under the pen name Frances E. Huntley. In September 1895, her short story "Her Story and His" was published in Chapman's Magazine of Fiction, under the same pen name.

Later that year, in December, Harland invited Mayne to become sub-editor of The Yellow Book (to replace Ella D'Arcy, who had gone to France) and Mayne moved to London on 1 January 1896 to take up the post. Another short story, "Two Stories", appeared in the January 1896 edition of The Yellow Book, again under the Huntley pen name. She was much influenced by Harland, but tensions arose when D'Arcy returned in the spring and set about undermining her position at the periodical, and when Harland refused to intervene, Mayne gave up and returned to Cork.

She continued writing and in 1898 published her first collection of short-stories, The Clearer Vision, this time under her own name. The title derives from a favourite phrase of Harland's, "the clearer vision of the writer". She published her first novel, Jessie Vandeleur in 1902. That year her mother died, and she was left to look after her father and her invalid sister Violet.

In 1905 her father retired, and the family moved to London, residing in Holland Road, Kensington. She published her first translation, anonymously, in 1907: The Diary of a Lost One by the German writer Margarete Böhme, a purported true-life diary of a girl forced into prostitution and a best-selling sensation at the time.

She published her second novel, The Fourth Ship, in 1908, and also published her first French translation, a work of the French historian Jules-Auguste Lair on Louise de La Vallière, mistress of Louis XIV. She would continue publishing translations of French and German works throughout her life.

In 1909 she published her first biographical work, Enchanters of Men, "studies of two dozen sirens from Diane de Poitiers to Adah Isaacs Menken". In 1912, in what became a specialist subject for her, she published a two-volume biography of Byron, which was well-received, and became her best known work. She followed this in 1913 with a literary study of Robert Browning, Browning's Heroines.

Her fourth and last novel, One of Our Grandmothers, was published in 1916.

Mayne was an active all-round journalist, reviewing fiction for The Nation and The Daily News, and writing articles for the Daily Chronicle and The Yorkshire Post. In the 1920s and 1930s she was on the English committee of the Prix Femina, a French literary prize with an all-female panel, and president 1924-25.

She published her sixth and final collection of short stories, Inner Circle, in 1925.

In January 1927 her father died, which meant the loss of his pension, and left the family, which included Violet and a brother-in-law, dependent on her literary income. Now in her sixties, she was granted a small civil list pension in March that year for "services to literature". The family moved from Kensingston to Richmond and then to near-by St. Margarets, in Twickenham, where she continued her literary work, and found recreation in "walking, reading and playing patience".

In 1929 she published The Life and Letters of Anne Isabella, Lady Noel Byron, on Lady Noel Byron, Byron's wife, and continuing her speciality, published a translation of Charles du Bos's Byron et le besoin de la fatalité in 1932.

She was friends with the writers Hugh Walpole, Violet Hunt, and (especially) Mary Butts.

In 1939, aged 74, she published her final work, A Regency Chapter: Lady Bessborough and Her Friendships, a study of the Countess of Bessborough, the mother of Byron's mistress Lady Caroline Lamb. In May that year she was granted a pension by the Royal Literary Fund.

Mayne died on 30 April 1941 at the Trinity Nursing Home in Torquay, Devon.

== Work ==
According to Allan Nevins, her short stories showed "exquisite pains addressed to essentially inconsequential themes". Robert Morss Lovett wrote "Miss Mayne's touch upon reality is delicate, reserved, withdrawing". Stanley Kunitz describes her Encanters of Men biographical study as "vivacious and readable".

== Books ==
=== Novels ===
- Jessie Vandeleur (London: George Allen, 1902) OCLC 38698862
- The Fourth Ship (London: Chapman & Hall, 1908) OCLC 42450206
- Gold Lace: A Study of Girlhood (London: Chapman & Hall, 1913) OLCL 42450082
- One of Our Grandmothers (London: Chapman & Hall, 1916) OCLC 20034610

=== Short stories ===
- "A Pen-and-ink Effect" [as Frances E. Huntley] The Yellow Book Volume VI, (London: John Lane, July 1895)
- "Her Story and His" [as Frances E. Huntley] Chapman's Magazine of Fiction Volume 2, (London: Chapman & Hall, September 1895)
- "Two Stories" [as Frances E. Huntley] The Yellow Book Volume VIII, (London: John Lane, January 1896)
- The Clearer Vision (London: T. Fisher Unwin, 1898) OCLC 300593300
- Things That No One Tells (London: Chapman & Hall, 1910) OCLC 314997294
- Come In (London: Chapman & Hall, 1917) OCLC 5312985

"The Separate Room", "Four Ballrooms", "Lovells Meeting", "The Kingfisher", "Three Rooms", "Forgetfulness", "The Turret-room"

- Blindman (London: Chapman & Hall, 1919) OCLC 5312936
- Nine of Hearts (London: Constable & Co., 1923) OCLC 561696103
- Inner Circle (London: Constable & Co., 1925) OCLC 7038692

"The Latchkey", "The Shirt of Nessus", "Black Magic", "Stripes", "Campaign", "Lavender and Lucinda", "The Picnic", "Still Life", "Dialogue in a Cab", "Franklin's Problem"

=== Biographies & Literary Criticism ===
- Enchanters of Men (1909) OCLC 1015498
- The Romance of Monaco and Its Rulers (London: Hutchinson, 1910) OCLC 3256380
- Byron (London: Methuen, 1912) OCLC 457550037, 2nd Ed. rev. (London: Methuen, 1924) OCLC 623168754
- Browning's Heroines (London: Chatto & Windus, 1913) OCLC 78307556
- The Life and Letters of Anne Isabella, Lady Noel Byron: from unpublished papers in the possession of the late Ralph, Earl of Lovelace (London: Constable & Co., 1929) OCLC 567944026
- A Regency Chapter; Lady Bessborough and Her Friendships (London: Macmillan & Co., 1939) OCLC 424444

=== Translations ===
- The Diary of a Lost One [anonymously] - Margarete Böhme [from the German Tagebuch einer Verlorenen : von einer Toten (Berlin: Fontane, 1905)] (London: Sisley, 1907) OCLC 5505472
- Louise de La Vallière and the Early Life of Louis XIV : from unpublished documents - Jules-Auguste Lair [from the French Louise de la Vallière et la jeunesse de Louis XIV. d'après des documents inédits (Paris: Plon, 1881)] (London: Hutchinson, 1908) OCLC 2935392
- Casanova and His Time - Edouard Maynial [from the French Casanove et son temps (Paris: Mercure de France, 1910)] (London: Chapman & Hall, 1911) OCLC 1373691
- The Lessons of Raoul Pugno. Chopin. With a biography of Chopin by M. Michel Delines - Raoul Pugno, Michel Delines (Михаил Осипович Ашкинази) [from the French Les Leçons écrites de Raoul Pugno. Chopin. Avec une biographie de Chopin par M. Michel Delines (Paris, 1910)] (London: Boosey & Co., 1911) OCLC 504007323
- My Friendship with Prince Hohenlohe - Baroness Alexandrine von Hedemann, ed. Denise Petit [from the German Ein Blatt der Liebe : Chlodwig Fürst zu Hohenlohe-Schillingsfürst und seine Freundin Alex (Berlin-Charlottenburg: Est-Est, 1911)] (London: Eveleigh Nash, 1912) OCLC 8935643
- The Department Store : A Novel of Today - Margarete Böhme [from the German W.A.G.M.U.S. (Berlin: F. Fontane & Co., 1911)] (New York & London: D. Appleton, 1912) OCLC 4927945
- Letters of Fyodor Michailovitch Dostoevsky to His Family and Friends - Fyodor Dostoyevsky [from the German translation by Alexander Eliasberg (Munich, 1914)] (London: Chatto & Windus, 1914) OCLC 3592364
- Madame de Pompadour : A Study in Temperament - Marcelle Tinayre [from the French Madame de Pompadour (Paris: Flammarion, 1924)] (London & New York: G. P. Putnam's Sons, 1925) 3834211
- Wilhelm Hohenzollern, The Last of the Kaisers - Emil Ludwig [from the German Wilhelm der Zweite (Berlin: Rowohlt, 1925)] (New York: G. P. Putnam's Sons, 1926) (London edition 1927 entitled Kaiser Wilhelm II) OCLC 317627714
- Goethe : The History of a Man, 1749-1832 - Emil Ludwig [from the German Goethe : Geschichte eines Menschen (Stuttgart: J. G. Cotta, 1920) (abridged version)] (London & New York: G. P. Putnam's Sons, 1928) OCLC 223202472
- Selected poems of Carl Spitteler - Carl Spitteler [from the German, with James Fullarton Muirhead] (London & New York: G. P. Putnam's Sons, 1928) OCLC 716163064
- Philip Eulenburg : The Kaiser's Friend - Johannes Haller [from the German Aus dem Leben des Fürsten Philipp zu Eulenburg-Hertefeld (Berlin: Gebr. Paetel, 1924)] (New York: A. A. Knopf, 1930) OCLC 390701 ISBN 9780836956511
- The Forest Ship : A Book of the Amazon - Richard Arnold Bermann [from the German Das Urwaldschiff : ein Buch vom Amazonenstrom (Berlin: Volksverband der Bücherfreunde, 1927)] (London & New York: Putnam, 1930) OCLC 26320404
- Three Titans - Emil Ludwig [from the German "Michelangelo" and "Rembrandts Schicksal" and from the essay on Beethoven in "Kunst und Schicksal."] (New York & London: G. P. Putnam's Sons, 1930) OCLC 407891
- Byron and the Need of Fatality - Charles du Bos [from the French Byron et le besoin de la fatalité (Paris: Au Sans Pareil, 1929)] (London & New York: G. P. Putnam's Sons, 1932) OCLC 635984
