= The Great Gay Road =

The Great Gay Road may refer to:

- The Great Gay Road (novel), a 1910 novel by Tom Gallon
- The Great Gay Road (1920 film), a silent film adaptation
- The Great Gay Road (1931 film), a sound film adaptation
