= Meg the Lady =

Meg the Lady may refer to:

- Meg the Lady (novel), a 1905 novel by the British writer Tom Gallon
- Meg the Lady (film), a 1916 British film directed by Maurice Elvey
