= Diary of a Lost Woman =

1918 film directed by Richard Oswald

- German release poster
- Directed by: Richard Oswald
- Written by: Richard Oswald
- Based on: Tagebuch einer Verlorenen {novel) by Margarete Böhme
- Produced by: Richard Oswald
- Starring: Erna Morena; Reinhold Schünzel; Werner Krauss
- Cinematography: Max Fassbender
- Production company: Richard-Oswald-Produktion
- Release date: 29 October 1918
- Running time: 94 minutes
- Country: Germany
- Languages: Silent; German intertitles

Diary of a Lost Woman (German: Das Tagebuch einer Verlorenen) is a 1918 German silent drama film directed by Richard Oswald and starring Erna Morena, Reinhold Schünzel, and Werner Krauss. The rising star Conrad Veidt also appeared. It is now considered a lost film. It was remade at the end of the silent era as Diary of a Lost Girl by Georg Wilhelm Pabst.

Due to the film's over theme of prostitution it had major censorship issues which delayed its release for several months and led to a number of cuts.

The film's sets were designed by the art director August Rinaldi.

== Cast ==
- Erna Morena as Thymian
- Reinhold Schünzel as Graf Kasimir Osdorff
- Werner Krauss as Meinert
- Paul Rehkopf as Geoteball
- Conrad Veidt as Dr. Julius
- Max Laurence as Der alte Graf
- Ilse Wejrmann as Elisabeth Woyens
- Marga Köhler as Lene Peters
- Marie von Buelow as Frau Kindermann
- Clementine Plessner as Tante Frieda

== Bibliography ==
- Kreimeier, Klaus. The Ufa Story: A History of Germany's Greatest Film Company, 1918-1945. University of California Press, 1999.
- Soister, John T. Conrad Veidt on Screen: A Comprehensive Illustrated Filmography. McFarland, 2002.
