= The Story of Dida Ibsen =

1918 film directed by Richard Oswald

- Directed by: Richard Oswald
- Written by: Richard Oswald
- Produced by: Richard Oswald
- Starring: Anita Berber; Conrad Veidt; Werner Krauss; Emil Lind
- Cinematography: Max Fassbender
- Production company: Richard-Oswald-Produktion
- Release date: 12 December 1918
- Country: Germany
- Languages: Silent; German intertitles

The Story of Dida Ibsen (German: Dida Ibsens Geschichte) is a 1918 German silent drama film directed by Richard Oswald and starring Anita Berber, Conrad Veidt and Werner Krauss. It is an adaptation of Margarete Böhme's 1907 novel of the same title, a sequel to her best-known work The Diary of a Lost Girl. It was one of a series of enlightenment films made by Oswald during the period.

== Cast ==
- Anita Berber as Dida Ibsen
- Conrad Veidt as Erik Norrensen
- Werner Krauss as Philipp Galen
- Emil Lind as Vater Ibsen
- Clementine Plessner as Frau Ibsen
- Ernst Pittschau as Eken Kornils
- Eugen Rex as Lude Schnack
- Ilse von Tasso-Lind as Dame
- Maria Forescu as Dienerin
- Loni Nest as Didas Tochter

== Bibliography ==
- Prawer, S.S. Between Two Worlds: The Jewish Presence in German and Austrian Film, 1910-1933. Berghahn Books, 2005.
- Woodford, Charlotte & Schofield, Benedict. The German Bestseller in the Late Nineteenth Century. Camden House, 2012.
