= Diary of a Lost Girl =

1929 film by Georg Wilhelm Pabst

- Directed by: G. W. Pabst
- Screenplay by: Rudolf Leonhard
- Based on: Tagebuch einer Verlorenen by Margarete Böhme
- Produced by: G. W. Pabst
- Starring: Louise Brooks; Fritz Rasp; André Roanne; Josef Rovenský; Franziska Kinz
- Cinematography: Sepp Allgeier
- Production company: Hom-Film AG; Pabst-Film GmbH
- Release dates: 12 September 1929 (Vienna); 15 October 1929 (Berlin)
- Running time: 110 minutes
- Country: Germany
- Language: Silent film

Diary of a Lost Girl (German: Tagebuch einer Verlorenen) is a 1929 German silent film directed by G. W. Pabst and starring American silent star Louise Brooks. The film was shot in black and white, and diverse versions of the film ranged from 79 minutes to 116 minutes in length. This was Brooks' second and last film with Pabst, and like their previous collaboration, Pandora's Box, many film historians consider it to be a classic. It is based on the controversial and bestselling 1905 novel of the same name by Margarete Böhme. The novel had been previously adapted by Richard Oswald as Diary of a Lost Woman.

== Plot ==
Diary of a Lost Girl (1929)

Thymian Henning, the innocent, naive daughter of pharmacist Robert Henning, is puzzled when their housekeeper, Elisabeth, leaves suddenly on the day of Thymian's confirmation. It turns out that her father has made Elisabeth pregnant. Elisabeth's body is brought to the pharmacy later that day, an apparent suicide by drowning, upsetting Thymian.

Robert Henning's assistant, Meinert, promises to explain it all to Thymian later that night but instead rapes her while she is unconscious, and she also becomes pregnant. Though Thymian refuses to name the illegitimate baby's father, her relatives find out by reading her diary and decide that the best solution is for her to marry Meinert. When Thymian refuses because she does not love him, they give the baby to a midwife and send Thymian to a strict reformatory for wayward girls run by a tyrannical woman and her tall, bald assistant.

Meanwhile, Thymian's friend, Count Osdorff, is cast off and left penniless by his rich uncle, also Count Osdorff, after he proves unsuccessful at every school and trade. Thymian begs her friend to persuade her father to take her back, but Thymian's father has married his new housekeeper, Meta, and Meta wants no rivals for his affection. Rebelling against the reformatory's rigid discipline, Thymian and her friend Erika escape with Osdorff's help. When Thymian goes to see her baby, she learns the child has recently died. After wandering the streets despondent, she reunites with Erika who is working in a small upper-class brothel. With no skills, Thymian also becomes a prostitute.

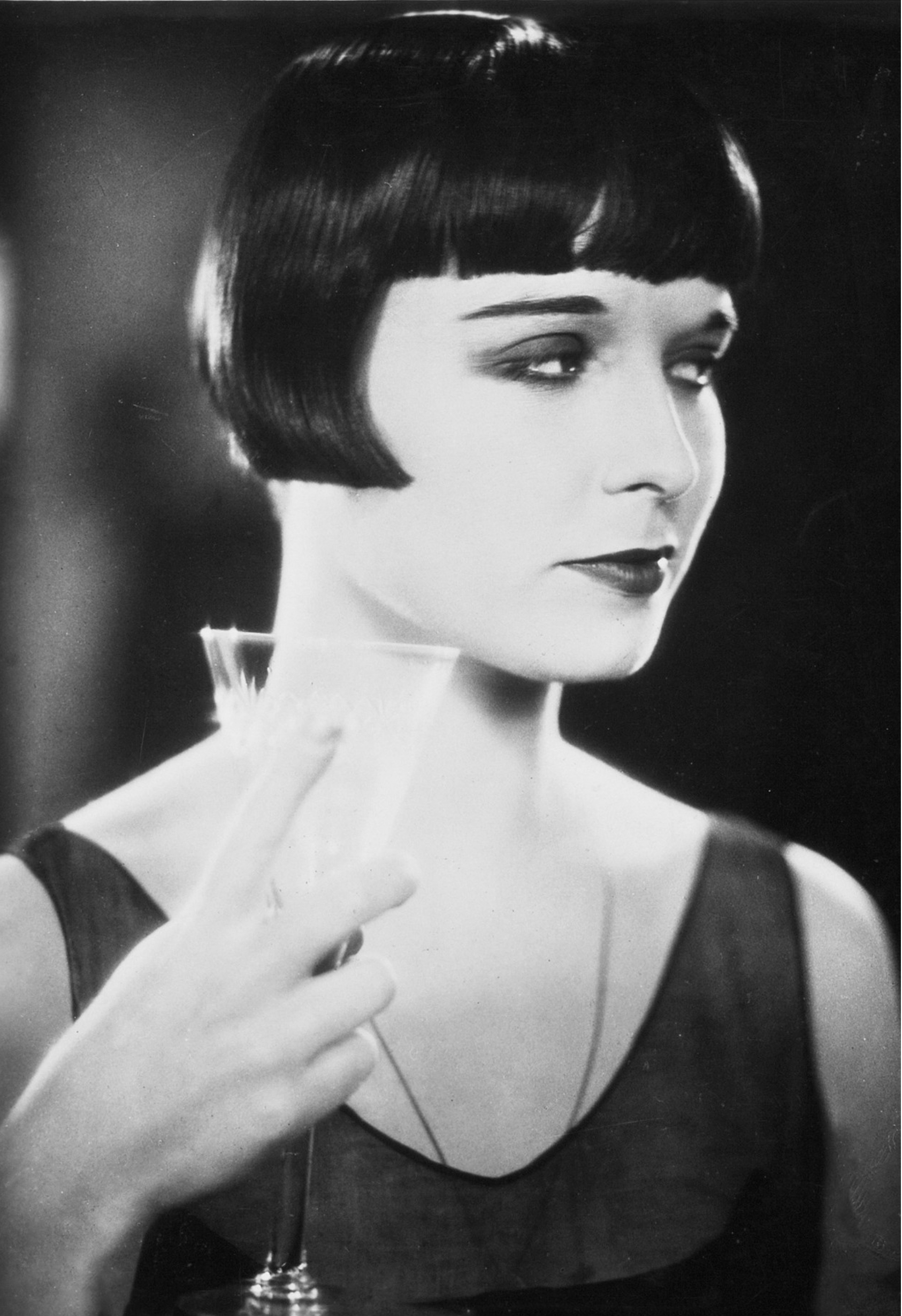
Brooks as Thymian in the brothel scene

By chance, Thymian encounters her father, Meta, and Meinert in a nightclub. Her father is shocked when he realises what she has become, and Meta and Meinert prevent them from speaking by quickly ushering Robert out of the nightclub. Three years later, her father dies. With the expectation of a large inheritance, Thymian decides to start a new life. Her friends at the brothel suggest she obtain a new identity by marrying Osdorff. After thinking about it, he agrees. At the lawyer's office, Meinert buys Thymian's interest in the pharmacy, making her rich. However, when she learns that Meinert is throwing Meta and her two children out on the street, Thymian gives Meta the money so that her young half-sister does not suffer the same fate as her.

Osdorff, who had been counting on the money to rebuild a life for himself, throws himself out of the window to his death when Thymian tells him what she has done. The uncle, grief-stricken, decides to make amends by taking care of Thymian. He introduces her to his cousin as his niece, Countess Osdorff. In a strange twist of fate, Thymian is invited to become a director of the same reformatory where she herself was once held. When Erika, her old friend, is brought before the directors as an "especially difficult case", Thymian denounces the school and takes Erika out of the room. Count Osdorff follows the two women; but before leaving, he pauses, turns back toward his startled cousin and declares: "A little more love and no-one would be lost in this world!"

== Cast ==
- Louise Brooks as Thymian Henning
- Fritz Rasp as Meinert
- Valeska Gert as the matron of the reformatory
- Josef Rovenský as Robert Henning, Thymian's father
- Vera Pawlowa as Aunt Frieda
- Franziska Kinz as Meta, the new housekeeper and later Robert's second wife
- André Roanne as Count Nicolas Osdorff
- Andrews Engelmann as the assistant at the reformatory
- Arnold Korff as the Elder Count Osdorff (uncredited)
- Edith Meinhard as Erika (uncredited)
- Sybille Schmitz as Elisabeth (uncredited)
- Kurt Gerron as Dr. Vitalis (uncredited)

== Release ==
Diary of a Lost Girl premiered in Vienna, Austria on 12 September 1929. It had its German premiere in Berlin on 15 October 1929.

== Reception ==
Roger Ebert included Diary on his list of "Great Movies," calling it "the close of [Louise Brooks'] glory days. It’s not the equal of Pandora’s Box, but her performance is on the same high level. It has a frankness that would largely disappear from mainstream films after the rise of censorship in the early 1930s." In a list of the 100 most important German films, compiled in 1994 by the Association of German Cinémathèques, Diary of a Lost Girl was placed at #63.

== Bibliography ==
- Campbell, Russell (2006). Marked Women: Prostitutes and Prostitution in the Cinema. Madison: University of Wisconsin Press. ISBN 978-0-299-21253-7.
