= Charlotte Mew =

English poet (1869–1928)

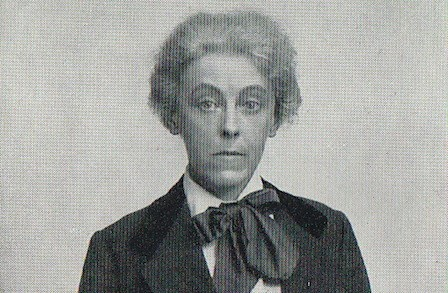
- Born: Charlotte Mary Mew; 15 November 1869; Bloomsbury, London, England
- Died: 24 March 1928 (aged 58); Westminster, England, United Kingdom
- Occupation: Writer
- Notable work: The Farmer's Bride (1916), The Rambling Sailor (1929)

Charlotte Mary Mew (15 November 1869 – 24 March 1928) was an English poet whose work spanned the eras of Victorian poetry and Modernism.

== Early life and education ==
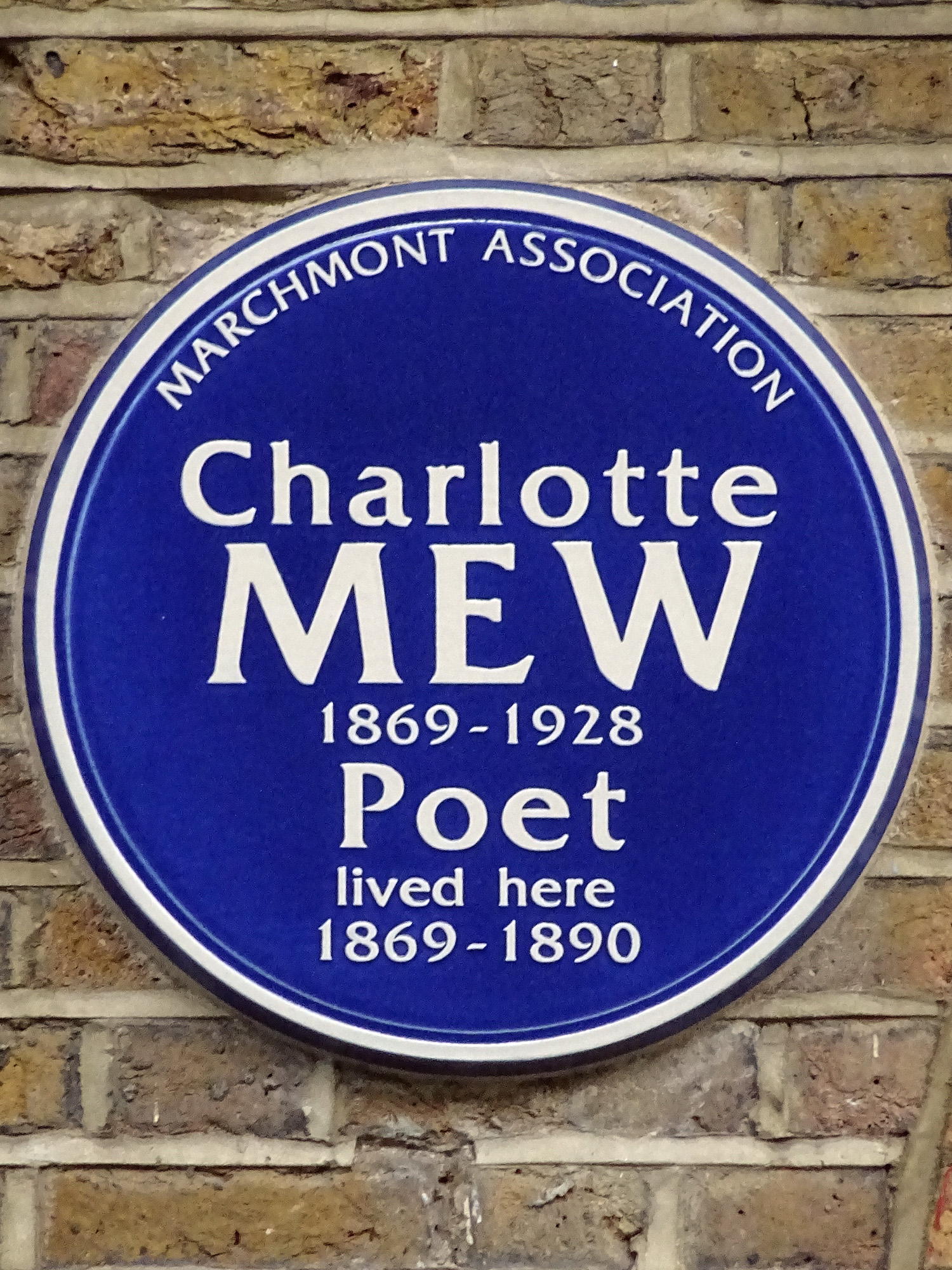
The blue plaque at 30 Doughty Street, where she was born

Mew was born in Bloomsbury, London, daughter of the architect Frederick Mew (1833-1898), who designed Hampstead Town Hall, and Anna Maria Marden (1837-1923), daughter of architect H. E. Kendall, for whom Frederick Mew had previously worked as an assistant. Frederick was the son of an innkeeper on the Isle of Wight. The marriage produced seven children. Charlotte, nicknamed Lotti by her family, attended Gower Street School, where she was greatly influenced by the school's headmistress, Lucy Harrison, and attended lectures at University College London. The family moved to 9, Gordon Street in 1888, living in "genteel near-poverty"; her father died in 1898 without making adequate provision for his family. Two of her siblings suffered from mental illness and were committed to institutions, and three others died in early childhood, leaving Charlotte, her mother, and her sister Anne.

Charlotte and Anne made a pact never to marry for fear of passing mental illness on to their children. Mew was likely a lesbian; according to Penelope Fitzgerald's account in Mew's entry in the Oxford Dictionary of National Biography, after Mew's first short story was published in the Yellow Book journal, "she met and was deeply attracted to its dashing assistant editor, Ella D'Arcy. In 1902 she went to meet Ella in Paris, but the visit was a bitter disappointment. Ten years later she fell in love with the novelist May Sinclair, and apparently chased her into the bedroom, where she was humiliatingly rejected. Her divided nature made these emotional disasters particularly painful because her ladylike side ... totally disapproved of them." One scholar believes that Charlotte was "almost certainly chastely lesbian". However, a more recent biography by the poet Julia Copus questions some of these assumptions about Charlotte Mew. Copus mentions that Mew has "frequently been identified as a lesbian" including by Penelope Fitzgerald. Yet, she adds, there is also a rumour that Mew "conducted an illicit affair with Thomas Hardy". Copus argues that "such hypotheses occur when there is a vacuum surrounding a writer’s private life; we do not like to accept that no evidence can be found – or indeed that there may have been no active love life at all." The matter, Copus continues, is further compounded by the fact that Mew was exceptionally private and omitted even to provide biographical notes for anthologies.

Mew had a strong sense of style: her friend and editor Alida Monro remembers her wearing distinctive red worsted stockings in the winter months, and she insisted on buying her black, button-up boots (in a tiny size 2) from Pinet's bootmakers in Mayfair; items left to different friends in her will (such as a "small three drop diamond pendant" and a "scarlet Chinese embroidered scarf") also suggest a keen interest in fashion. In later years, she often dressed in masculine attire, adopting the appearance of a dandy. Another biography by Julia Copus questions this notion of Charlotte Mew as a dandy, suggesting her attire was not quintessentially "masculine" as has been claimed in the past.

== Writing career ==
In 1894, Mew succeeded in getting a short story published in The Yellow Book. Entitled "Passed," it was inspired by Mew's activities as a volunteer social worker and concerns a distressed woman, suggested to be a prostitute, who leads the narrator to a room where her sister lies dead. The narrator is profoundly shocked by the experience, but flees in the end to her comfortable life. She later sees the woman, accompanied by a man, and this causes the narrator to break down, unable to ignore the social ills around her. Five years followed without any publications, but by the beginning of the 20th century Mew was contributing fiction with some regularity to magazines, including Temple Bar. She apparently wrote very little poetry until the 1910s. Her first collection, The Farmer's Bride, was published in 1916 in chapbook format by the Poetry Bookshop; in the United States this collection was entitled Saturday Market and published in 1921 by Macmillan. It earned her the admiration of Sydney Cockerell and drew respect for her as a poet from writers such as Sara Teasdale, Ezra Pound, and Virginia Woolf.

Her poems are varied: some of them (such as "Madeleine in Church") are passionate discussions of faith and the possibility of belief in God; others are proto-modernist in form and atmosphere ("In Nunhead Cemetery"). She made experimental use of long, prose-like lines, and varieties of enjambment and indentation, which has been praised for its originality. Many of her poems are in the form of dramatic monologues, and she often wrote from the point of view of a male persona ("The Farmer's Bride"). Two concern mental illness – "Ken" and "On the Asylum Road". Many of Mew's poems, including "Ken", "The Farmer's Bride", and "Saturday Market", are about outcast figures, expressing Mew's feelings of alienation from the community in which she lived. Her poem "The Trees Are Down" is a poignant plea for ecological sensitivity and is singled out particularly in the anthology The Green Book of Poetry by Ivo Mosley.

Mew gained the patronage of several literary figures, notably Thomas Hardy, who called her the best woman poet of her day; Virginia Woolf, who said she was "very good and interesting and quite unlike anyone else"; and Siegfried Sassoon. In 1923, she obtained a Civil List pension of £75 per year with the aid of Cockerell, Hardy, John Masefield, and Walter de la Mare. This helped ease her financial difficulties.

== Decline and death ==
Despite the critical success of her work, Mew did not earn enough money to support herself as well as her mother and sister. In 1916, the house they lived in was condemned.

After the death of her sister from cancer in 1927, Mew continued to live at 64, Charlotte Street, Fitzroy Square. She descended into a deep depression and was admitted to the Beaumont Street Nursing Home in Marylebone, where she committed suicide by drinking Lysol, a disinfectant. After Mew's death, her friend Alida Monro (who was married to Harold Monro, publisher of Mew's first book), collected and edited her poetry for publication as The Rambling Sailor, released in 1929.

Mew is buried in the northern part of Hampstead Cemetery in London.
