= The Best American Short Stories of the Century =

2000 short story collection curated by John Updike

- Editor: John Updike and Katrina Kenison
- Language: English
- Series: The Best American Short Stories
- Publisher: Houghton Mifflin Harcourt
- Publication date: April 20, 2000
- Media type: Print (hardback & paperback)
- Pages: 864
- ISBN: 978-0-395-84368-0

The Best American Short Stories of the Century is a volume in The Best American Short Stories series, was curated by John Updike and co-edited by Katrina Kenison. It consists of 55 stories from 1915 to 1998. The volume was published by Houghton Mifflin Harcourt.

== Background ==
The series is considered one of the "best-known annual anthologies of short fiction" and has anthologized more than 2,000 short stories, including works by some of the most famous writers in contemporary American literature, curated by well-known guest editors since 1915.

In particular, the Willa Cather Review wrote that The Best American Short Stories series "became a repository of values" for creative writing programs, college libraries, and literary magazines.

== Critical reception ==
In a starred review, Publishers Weekly stated that "Life on this continent may be brutal, but this extraordinary collection offers up dazzling writing that salves the wounds, as well as stories full of the pleasures of life."

The New York Times stated that "Updike has made some surprising—even striking—selections, and in consequence this collection seems far less predictable than it might have been" and that "Finding wonderful stories that you don't already know is one of this collection's great pleasures."

The Observer noted Updike's curation based not in national themes but rather human sentimentality, stating that "The result is a most interesting mix of good and great, of obscure writers and much-anthologized classics, of literary curios and polished diamonds... In sum, this is a terrific collection that ought to be read by anyone interested in good writing or curious about the 20th-century American social scene."

== Short stories included ==
| Year | Author | Story | Source |
|---|---|---|---|
| 1915 | Benjamin Rosenblatt | "Zelig" | The Bellman |
| 1916 | Mary Lerner | "Little Selves" | The Atlantic Monthly |
| 1917 | Susan Glaspell | "A Jury of Her Peers" | Every Week Magazine |
| 1920 | Sherwood Anderson | "The Other Woman" | The Triumph of the Egg |
| 1922 | Ring Lardner | "The Golden Honeymoon" | Cosmopolitan |
| 1923 | Jean Toomer | "Blood-Burning Moon" | Prairie |
| 1927 | Ernest Hemingway | "The Killers" | Scribner's Magazine |
| 1929 | Willa Cather | "Double Birthday" | The Forum |
| 1929 | Grace Stone Coates | "Wild Plums" | The Frontier |
| 1930 | Katherine Anne Porter | "Theft" | The Gyroscope |
| 1931 | William Faulkner | "That Evening Sun Go Down" | The American Mercury |
| 1931 | Dorothy Parker | "Here We Are" | Cosmopolitan |
| 1933 | F. Scott Fitzgerald | "Crazy Sunday" | The American Mercury |
| 1934 | Alexander Godin | "My Dead Brother Comes to America" | The Windsor Quarterly |
| 1935 | William Saroyan | "Resurrection of a Life" | Story |
| 1938 | Robert Penn Warren | "Christmas Gift" | Virginia Quarterly Review |
| 1939 | Richard Wright | "Bright and Morning Star" | New Masses |
| 1940 | Eudora Welty | "The Hitch-Hikers" | The Southern Review |
| 1943 | Paul Horgan | "The Peach Stone" | The Yale Review |
| 1944 | Vladimir Nabokov | "That in Aleppo Once..." | Atlantic Monthly |
| 1947 | Jean Stafford | "The Interior Castle" | Partisan Review |
| 1948 | Martha Gellhorn | "Miami-New York" | The Atlantic Monthly |
| 1948 | E. B. White | "The Second Tree from the Corner" | The New Yorker |
| 1949 | Elizabeth Bishop | "The Farmer's Children" | Harper's Bazaar |
| 1951 | J. F. Powers | "Death of a Favorite" | The New Yorker |
| 1951 | Tennessee Williams | "The Resemblance Between A Violin Case and a Coffin" | Flair |
| 1955 | John Cheever | "The Country Husband" | The New Yorker |
| 1956 | Flannery O'Connor | "Greenleaf" | The Kenyon Review |
| 1960 | Lawrence Sargent Hall | "The Ledge" | The Hudson Review |
| 1960 | Philip Roth | "Defender of the Faith" | The New Yorker |
| 1962 | Stanley Elkin | "Criers and Kibbitzers, Kibbitzers and Criers" | Perspective |
| 1964 | Bernard Malamud | "The German Refugee" | The Saturday Evening Post |
| 1967 | Joyce Carol Oates | "Where Are You Going, Where Have You Been?" | Epoch |
| 1968 | Mary Ladd Gavell | "The Rotifer" | Psychiatry |
| 1969 | James Alan McPherson | "Gold Coast" | The Atlantic |
| 1970 | Isaac Bashevis Singer | "The Key" | The New Yorker |
| 1973 | Donald Barthelme | "A City of Churches" | The New Yorker |
| 1975 | Rosellen Brown | "How to Win" | The Massachusetts Review |
| 1976 | Alice Adams | "Roses, Rhododendron" | The New Yorker |
| 1978 | Harold Brodkey | "Verona: A Young Woman Speaks" | Esquire |
| 1979 | Saul Bellow | "A Silver Dish" | The New Yorker |
| 1980 | John Updike | "Gesturing" | Playboy |
| 1981 | Cynthia Ozick | "The Shawl" | The New Yorker |
| 1983 | Raymond Carver | "Where I'm Calling From" | The New Yorker |
| 1986 | Ann Beattie | "Janus" | The New Yorker |
| 1987 | Susan Sontag | "The Way We Live Now" | The New Yorker |
| 1987 | Tim O'Brien | "The Things They Carried" | Esquire |
| 1989 | Alice Munro | "Meneseteung" | The New Yorker |
| 1990 | Lorrie Moore | "You're Ugly, Too" | The New Yorker |
| 1993 | Thom Jones | "I Want to Live!" | Harper's Magazine |
| 1994 | Alice Elliott Dark | "In the Gloaming" | The New Yorker |
| 1994 | Carolyn Ferrell | "Proper Library" | Ploughshares |
| 1995 | Gish Jen | "Birthmates" | Ploughshares |
| 1997 | Pam Durban | "Soon" | The Southern Review |
| 1998 | Annie Proulx | "The Half-Skinned Steer" | Close Range: Wyoming Stories |
| 1998 | Pam Houston | "The Best Girlfriend You Never Had" | Other Voices |
