= In Nunhead Cemetery =

"In Nunhead Cemetery" is a poem by Charlotte Mew. It is set in Nunhead Cemetery in south-east London. Opened in 1840, this is one of London's "Magnificent Seven" cemeteries, built as a response to the city's overflowing church graveyards. It is considered the least famous of the seven, possibly owing to difficulties of access, although there is a railway station (Nunhead) nearby, presumably the one referenced in the poem.

== Overview ==
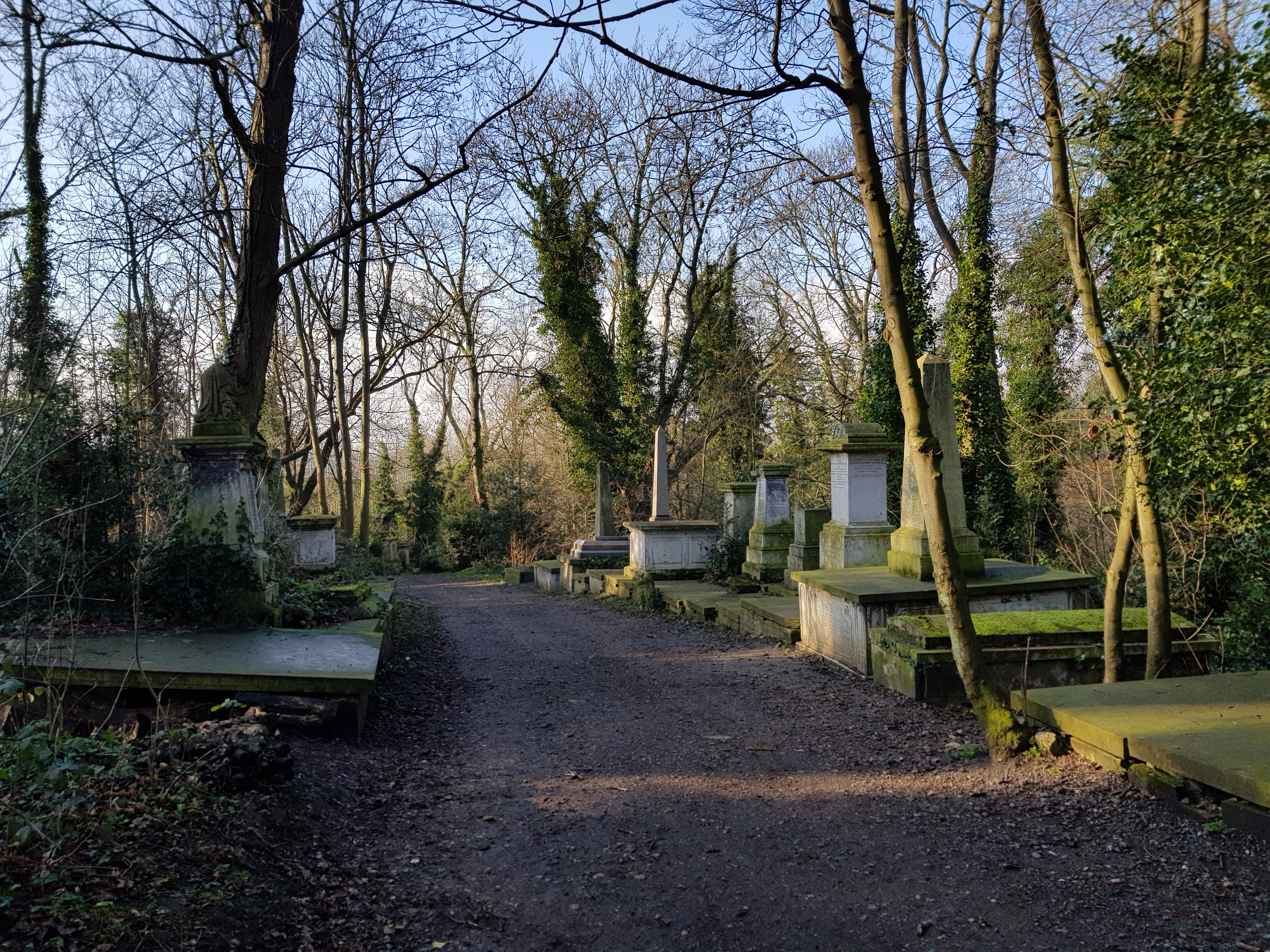
Scene in Nunhead Cemetery

The poem opens with a man standing over his fiancée's grave in the rain after her funeral. Everyone else has gone, but this man will not leave. Flowers were tossed into the grave by loved ones, and the man picks one of these up and muses that there is something terrible about a flower, and about a child, who smiled during the funeral. He then begins to recall memories of his fiancée, starting a week prior to the funeral, suggesting that the death occurred suddenly.

The man remembers her laughing at him as he tried to explain how she had made a better man of him. He briefly tells himself that none of this is real, that he might wake up and find it was all a dream. Then he goes back to thinking about the times they shared, waiting for Spring, most likely when their wedding date was set. He remembers sight-seeing with her, looking at the lion statues in Trafalgar Square, and the seagulls along the river, presumably the Thames. His fiancée seems to have been an adherent of folk beliefs, as she believed the seagulls to be the spirits of sea captains and the square's bronze lion sculptures to be watching over London. There is a legend that the lions will come to life when Big Ben strikes 13 times. This is probably the "bell" to which she refers.

The man returns to the present as he recalls how they missed their wedding day by a month. He begins to imagine what their honeymoon would have been like, musing that she had never kissed him back. He remembers how he let her go and now would do anything, no matter how damning, to have her back. He remembers being a little boy at Christmas time, how happy he was and how he used to pray for God to keep him safe at night, but now he is afraid and he has decided to stay with his fiancée in the graveyard, so she can help him sleep. He doesn't want to go home without her as he would be lonely. But here, in the graveyard, there are plenty of souls, including hers, to keep him company. So he stays there, imagining all of the people lying under their tombstones covered with flowers, and imagines that if they were all dug up again, they would not be dead.

== Analysis ==
The rhyme scheme of the poem starts off with a fairly regular ABAB and changes with the 5th verse, which is also where the narrator's tone changes as he tries to deny that any of this is really happening. The pattern returns once he calms down again, though only briefly. It seems to vary wildly when he reminiscences about his lost lover.

The poem moves through the stages of grief, and ends with the speaker unable to leave the cemetery. This suggests that he has not come to acceptance yet. There does not seem to be a lot of information about how the poem was interpreted, but many consider it an exploration into the topics of death, loss of faith/madness, and social alienation.
