= The Farmer's Bride =

1916 poetry collection by Charlotte Mew

- Cover of 1921 edition
- Author: Charlotte Mew
- Language: English
- Genre: Poetry collection
- Publisher: Poetry Bookshop
- Publication date: 1916
- Media type: Print

The Farmer's Bride is a poetry collection by Charlotte Mew, first published in 1916 under the imprint of Harold Monro's Poetry Bookshop. An expanded collection of the same name, with eleven additional poems, appeared in 1921. This was published in the US under the title Saturday Market.

The title poem in the collection, "The Farmer's Bride", had initially appeared in The Nation in 1912. The poem is a poignant lament by an inarticulate farmer about his love for his young wife and her inability to respond to him either physically or emotionally.

== The Farmer's Bride ==
Three Summers since I chose a maid,
Too young maybe – but more's to do
At harvest-time than bide and woo.
When us was wed she turned afraid
Of love and me and all things human;
Like the shut of a winter's day
Her smile went out, and 'twasn't a woman –
More like a little frightened fay.
One night, in the Fall, she runned away.

'Out 'mong the sheep, her be,' they said,
Should properly have been abed;
But sure enough she wasn't there
Lying awake with her wide brown stare.
So over seven-acre field and up-along across the down
We chased her, flying like a hare
Before our lanterns. To Church-Town
All in a shiver and a scare
We caught her, fetched her home at last
And turned the key upon her, fast.

She does the work about the house
As well as most, but like the mouse:
Happy enough to chat and play
With birds and rabbits as such as they,
So long as men-folk keep away.
'Not near, not near!' her eyes beseech
When one of us comes within reach.
The women say that beasts in stall
Look round like children at her call
I've hardly heard her speak at all

Shy as a leveret, swift as he,
Straight and slight as a young larch tree,
Sweet as the first wild violets, she,
To her wild self. But what to me?

The short days shorten and the oaks are brown,
The blue smoke rises to the low grey sky,
One leaf in the still air falls slowly down,
A magpie's spotted feathers lie
On the black earth spread white with rime,
The berries redden up to Christmas-time.
What's Christmas-time without there be
Some other in the house than we!

She sleeps up in the attic there
Alone, poor maid. 'Tis but a stair
Betwixt us. Oh! my God! the down,
The soft young down of her; the brown,
The brown of her – her eyes, her hair, her hair!

== Analysis ==
"The Farmer’s Bride" was a groundbreaking piece of work that shed light on Charlotte Mew's literary expertise and unique style of writing. Mew's life, which she kept very private, was full of tumultuous sorrow, loss, and upheaval from a very young age. As the oldest daughter of seven children she watched as several of her siblings were institutionalized, suffered from mental illness, and eventually committed suicide.
