= The Cruise of the Make-Believes =

1918 film by George Melford

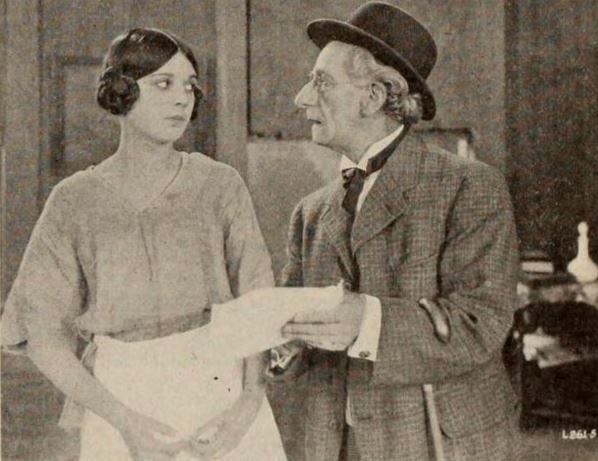
- Still with Lee and Aitken
- Directed by: George Melford
- Written by: Edith Kennedy (scenario)
- Based on: The Cruise of the Make-Believes by Tom Gallon
- Produced by: Adolph Zukor; Jesse Lasky
- Starring: Lila Lee; Harrison Ford
- Cinematography: Paul Perry
- Production company: Famous Players–Lasky Corporation
- Distributed by: Paramount Pictures
- Release date: September 1, 1918
- Running time: 5 reels
- Country: United States
- Language: Silent (English intertitles)

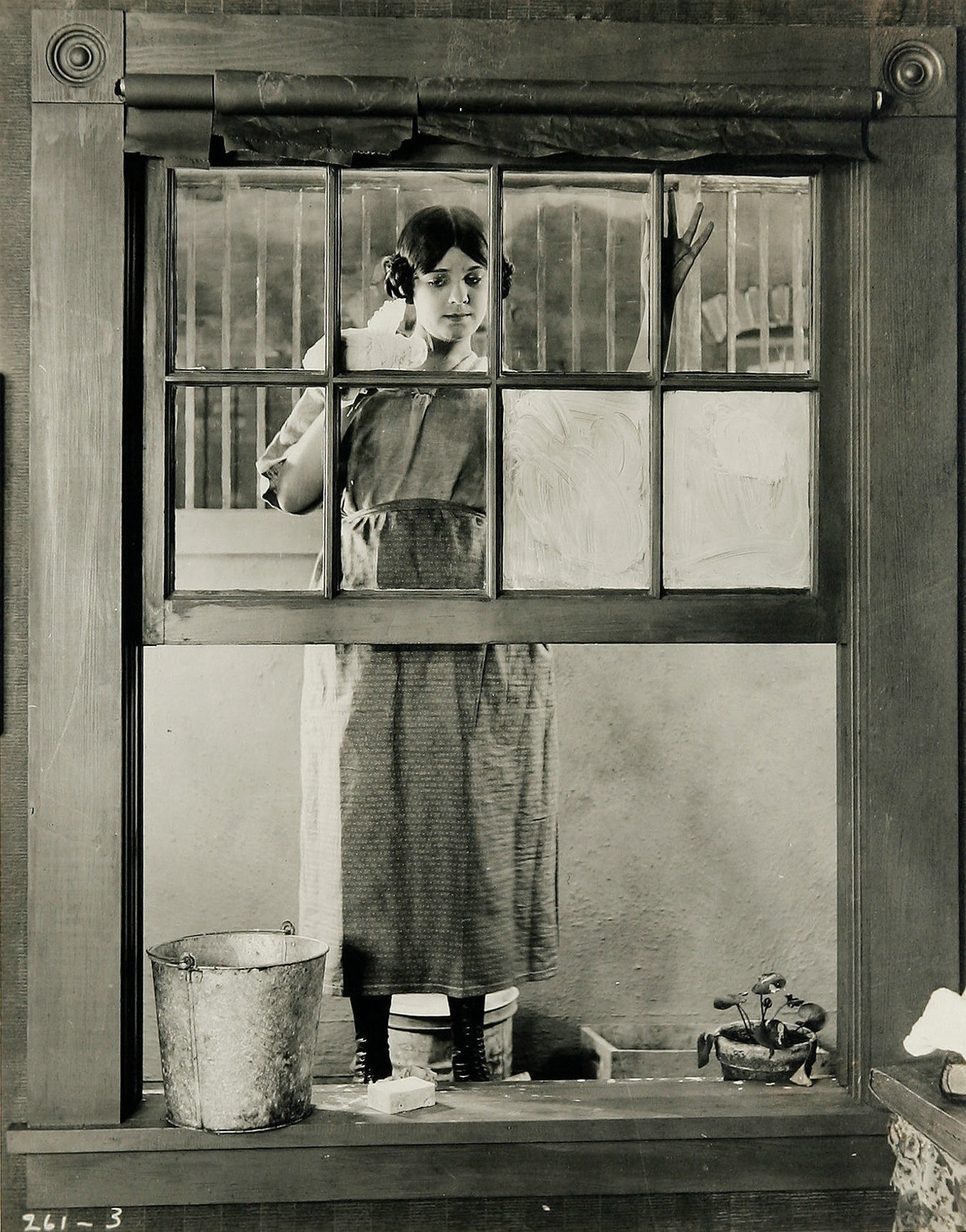
Scene from The Cruise of the Make-Believes featuring Lila Lee

The Cruise of the Make-Believes is a 1918 American silent drama film starring Lila Lee in her first motion picture. It was directed by George Melford and is based on a 1907 novel of the same name by Tom Gallon. Famous Players–Lasky produced and Paramount Pictures released.

The film was released at the height of the 1918 flu pandemic.

== Plot ==
As described in a film magazine, Bessie Meggison lives in the slums with her drunken father Daniel Meggison and presides over a boarding house. Gilbert Byfield, a wealthy youth who is writing a book, lives nearby in a cheap room. He becomes acquainted with Bessie and together they sail on many imaginary voyages on an improvised yacht in her back yard. Gilbert gives her father permission to take Bessie to his estate in the country for a month's vacation. Daniel Meggison invites his slum friends and drinks to his heart's content while Bessie entertains dozens of urchins. Gilbert returns and learns that Meggison has told Bessie that the estate belongs to him. Gilbert is also confronted by his fiancé, and Bessie realizes that all of her family wealth is a sham. Heartbroken, she returns to her slum home. Gilbert finds her on the make believe ship and promises her that her dream of riches will come true.

== Cast ==
- Lila Lee as Bessie Meggison
- Harrison Ford as Gilbert Byfield
- Raymond Hackett as Daniel Meggison
- William Brunton as Aubrey Meggison
- J. Parks Jones as Jordan Tant (credited as Park Jones)
- Spottiswoode Aitken as Simon Quarle
- Bud Duncan as Uncle Ed
- Eunice Murdock Moore as Aunt Julia (credited as Eunice Moore)
- Mayme Kelso as Mrs. Ewart Crane (credited as Maym Kelso)
- Nina Byron as Enid Crane
- William McLaughlin as Saloon Proprietor
- Jane Wolfe as Byfield's Landlady (credited as Jane Wolff)
- John McKinnon as Butler of Dream Valley

== Preservation ==
With no prints of The Cruise of the Make-Believes located in any film archives, it is a lost film.

== See also ==
- The Truth About Spring (1965), a similar-themed movie from the 1960s about coming of age
