= The Yellow Book =

1894–1897 British literary periodical

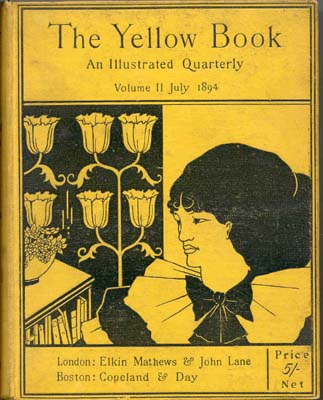
- The cover of vol. 11 illustrated by Aubrey Beardsley, July 1894
- Frequency: Quarterly
- Publisher: The Bodley Head
- Country: United Kingdom of Great Britain and Ireland
- Based in: London
- Language: English

The Yellow Book was a British quarterly literary periodical that was published in London from 1894 to 1897. It was published at The Bodley Head Publishing House by Elkin Mathews and John Lane, and later by John Lane alone, and edited by the American Henry Harland. The periodical was priced at 5 shillings (£0.25, equivalent to £28 in 2025) and its name contributed to the decade of its operation being referred to as the "Yellow Nineties".

== Significance ==
The Yellow Book was a leading journal of the British 1890s; to some degree associated with aestheticism and decadence, the magazine contained a wide range of literary and artistic genres, poetry, short stories, essays, book illustrations, portraits, and reproductions of paintings. Aubrey Beardsley was its first art editor, and he has been credited with the idea of the yellow cover, with its association with illicit French fiction of the period. He obtained works by such artists as Charles Conder, William Rothenstein, John Singer Sargent, Walter Sickert, and Philip Wilson Steer. The literary content was no less distinguished; authors who contributed were: Max Beerbohm, Arnold Bennett, "Baron Corvo", Ernest Dowson, George Gissing, Sir Edmund Gosse, Henry James, Richard Le Gallienne, Charlotte Mew, Arthur Symons, Arthur Waugh, H. G. Wells, William Butler Yeats and Frank Swettenham.

Though Oscar Wilde never published anything within its pages, the journal was linked to him because Beardsley had illustrated his Salomé, and because he was on friendly terms with many of its contributors. The magazine is also alluded to across his literature. In Wilde's The Picture of Dorian Gray (1891), a major corrupting influence on Dorian is "the yellow book" which Lord Henry sends over to amuse him after the suicide of his first love. In The Picture of Dorian Gray, the "yellow book" is understood by critics to be À rebours by Joris-Karl Huysmans, a representative work of Parisian decadence that heavily influenced British aesthetes like Beardsley. Such books in Paris were wrapped in yellow paper to alert the reader to their lascivious content. It is not clear, however, whether Dorian Gray is a direct source for the title of the journal.

A covert allusion to the "Yellow Book" can also be found in Wilde's drama, An Ideal Husband (1895). The character Mrs Cheveley states that she has "never read a Blue Book. I prefer books … in yellow colours." This remark also appears to contrast the statistical and informational blue books almanacs with the artistic and literary "yellow" books of the 1890s. Considering the later date of this drama's debut, 1895, than that of The Picture of Dorian Gray, it can be inferred that it is perhaps more likely that Mrs Cheveley's own allusion is to the actual "Yellow Book" magazine, as its publication began in 1894.

There were reports that Wilde was carrying a copy of the "Yellow Book" when he was arrested, at the Cadogan Hotel, in 1895. This report may or may not be correct, though Wilde cannot have been carrying a copy of Pierre Louÿs’s racy, yellow-bound novel Aphrodite, as has also been suggested, because this book was not published until 1896.

Soon after Wilde was arrested Beardsley was dismissed as the periodical's art editor; his post taken over by the publisher, John Lane, assisted by another artist, Patten Wilson. Although critics have contended that the quality of its contents declined after Beardsley left and that The Yellow Book became a vehicle for promoting the work of Lane's authors, a remarkably high standard in both art and literature was maintained until the periodical ceased publication in early 1897. A notable feature was the inclusion of work by women writers and illustrators, among them Ella D'Arcy and Ethel Colburn Mayne (both also served as Harland's subeditors), George Egerton, Charlotte Mew, Rosamund Marriott Watson, Ada Leverson, Ethel Reed and the sisters Netta Syrett, Mabel Syrett and Nellie Syrett.

Perhaps indicative of The Yellow Book's past significance in literary circles of its day is a reference to it in a fictional piece thirty-three years after it ceased publication. American author Willa Cather noted its presence in the personal library of one of her characters in the short story, "Double Birthday", noting that it had lost its "power to seduce and stimulate".

The Yellow Book differed from other periodicals in that it was issued clothbound, made a strict distinction between the literary and art contents (only in one or two instances were these connected), did not include serial fiction, and contained no advertisements except publishers' lists.

== Initial reception ==
The Yellow Book's brilliant colour immediately associated the periodical with illicit French novels – an anticipation, many thought, of the scurrilous content inside. The article 'A Defence of Cosmetics' by Max Beerbohm appeared in the first volume, causing something of a sensation and establishing his reputation. Yet generally The Yellow Book's first list of contributors bespoke a non-radical, typically conservative collection of authors: Edmund Gosse, Walter Crane, Frederick Leighton, and Henry James among others.

Upon its publication, Oscar Wilde dismissed The Yellow Book as "not yellow at all". In The Romantic '90s, Richard Le Gallienne, a poet identified with the New Literature of the Decadence, described The Yellow Book as the following: "The Yellow Book was certainly novel, even striking, but except for the drawings and decorations by Beardsley, which, seen thus for the first time, not unnaturally affected most people as at once startling, repellent, and fascinating, it is hard to realize why it should have seemed so shocking. But the public is an instinctive creature, not half so stupid as is usually taken for granted. It evidently scented something queer and rather alarming about the strange new quarterly, and thus it almost immediately regarded it as symbolic of new movements which it only partially represented".

== Influence of Aubrey Beardsley ==
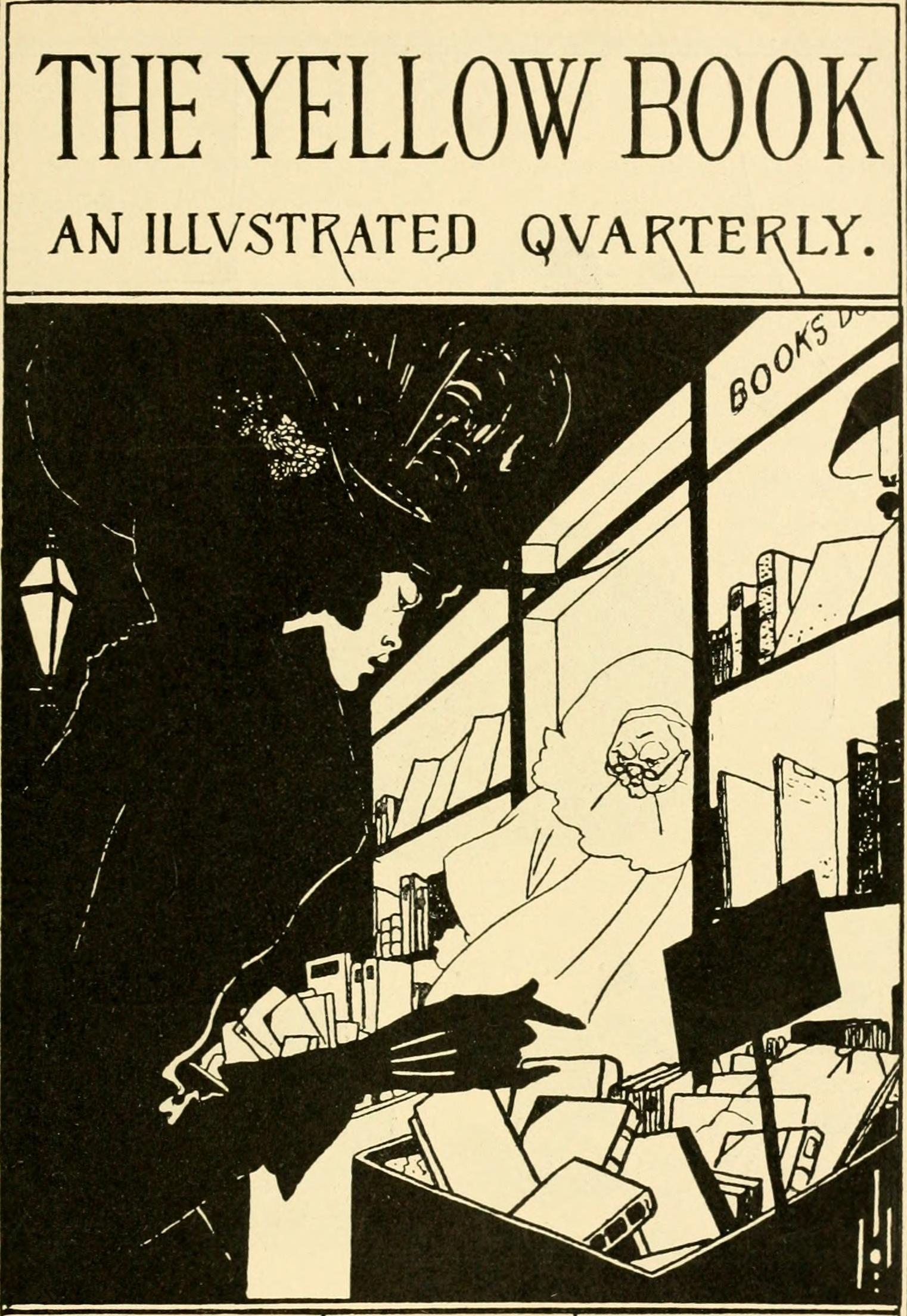
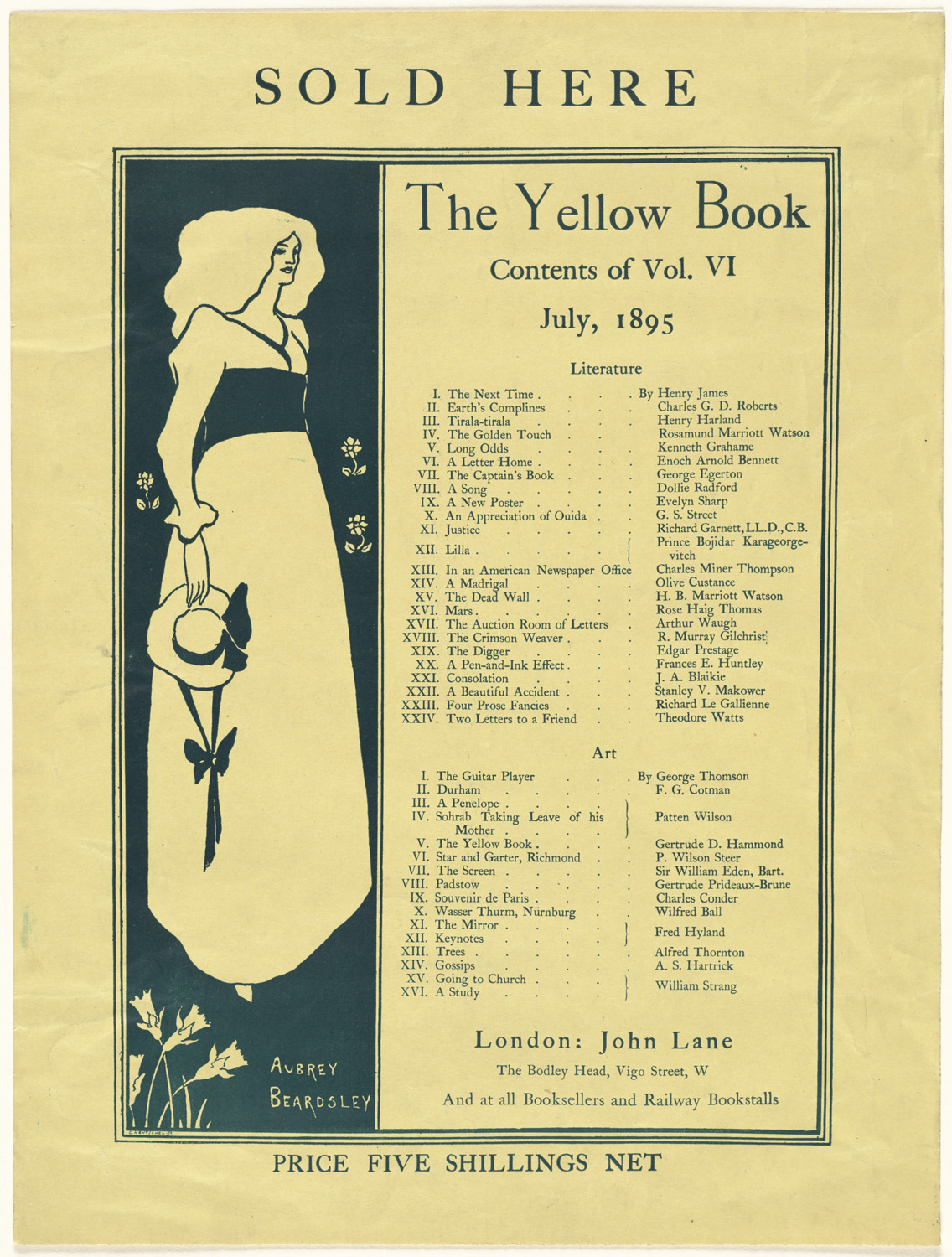
Left: Aubrey Beardsley's decadence-inspired advertisement for the April 15th issue in 1894, otherwise known as Volume I.
Right: his advertisement for the July issue in 1895, otherwise known as Volume VI, after he was forced to quit.
Click on either to enlarge.

The Yellow Book owed much of its reputation to Aubrey Beardsley, who, despite John Lane's remonstrations, repeatedly attempted to shock public opinion. Lane painstakingly perused Beardsley's drawings before each publication, as Beardsley was known for hiding inappropriate details in his work. Throughout Beardsley's contribution to The Yellow Book, the two were caught in a game of hide-and-seek. Lane's scrutiny of Beardsley's drawings suggests that he wished The Yellow Book to be a publication only slightly associated with the Decadence's shocking aesthetic. Indeed, Lane continually emphasized that he desired the work to be suitable reading material for any audience.

However, Beardsley openly mocked the Victorian artistic ideal, which he considered to be prudish and hypocritical. Beardsley's artwork was perhaps the most controversial aspect of The Yellow Book; his style was thought to be highly unnatural and grotesque, and he was openly caricatured in contemporary periodicals.

In response, Beardsley cleverly published two drawings stylistically divergent to his own under the names Phillip Broughton and Albert Foschter in The Yellow Book's third volume. While Saturday Review termed Broughton's piece "a drawing of merit" and Foschter's "a clever study", they decried the drawings under Beardsley's own name, deeming them "as freakish as ever".

Beardsley's contribution transformed The Yellow Book into a periodical associated with the more decadent attitudes of the fin-de-siecle. It was the decision of both Beardsley and Henry Harland to design the book in accordance with the French novel. This decision was the key factor in causing Beardsley's removal from the periodical. The media reported the yellow book which Oscar Wilde carried to his trial to be The Yellow Book itself. Sally Ledger writes in "Wilde Women and The Yellow Book: The Sexual Politics of Aestheticism and Decadence", "[A]s far as the newspapers were concerned, Wilde was accompanied to his trial by The Yellow Book, and such media reports cemented in the cultural imagination of the 1890s an association between The Yellow Book, aestheticism and Decadence and, after April and May 1895, homosexuality". Due to Beardsley's associations with Wilde through his illustrations of Salome, poetry contributor William Watson demanded he be fired as art editor. With this internal and (after Bodley Head's premises were set upon by a mob who vandalised the building) external pressure, publishers removed all traces of the artist in the quarterly after Volume V, though an advertisement exists for Volume VI exhibiting his work.

According to Stanley Weintraub, "The color of The Yellow Book was an appropriate reflection of the 'Yellow Nineties', a decade in which Victorianism was giving way among the fashionable to Regency attitudes and French influences; For yellow was not only the decor of the notorious and dandified pre-Victorian Regency, but also of the allegedly wicked and decadent French novel". If The Yellow Book was not as "daring" as its prospectus advertised, it was still a part of the vanguard of cultural debate which typified the main struggles of the "Yellow Nineties". Its variegated array of contributors associated The Yellow Book with the "impressionism, feminism, naturalism, dandyism, symbolism and classicism [which] all participate[d] in the politics of decadence in the nineties". Sabine Doran writes (in her The Culture of Yellow, or, The Visual Politics of Late Modernity) that "from the moment of its conception, The Yellow Book presents itself as having a close relationship with the culture of scandal; it is, in fact, one of the progenitors of this culture."

== Art separate from text ==
The Yellow Book has been credited as "... commercially the most ambitious and typographically the most important of the 1890s periodicals. [It] gave the fullest expression to the double resistance of graphic artists against literature, and Art against commerce, the double struggle symbolized by the paired words on the contents-pages of the Yellow Books: Letterpress and Pictures, Literature and Art."

The Yellow Book's contents-pages diverged from Victorian ideas concerning art, where "[t]exts prescribed pictures and not the other way round". In the Illustration of Books: A Manual for the Use of Students, Joseph Pennell explains that "an illustration really is a work of art ... which is explanatory". Interviewed before the appearance of The Yellow Book's first publication, Harland and Beardsley rejected the idea that the function of artwork was merely explanatory: "There is to be no connection whatever [between the text and illustrations]. [They] will be quite separate". The equilibrium which The Yellow Book poses between art and text is emphasized by the separate title pages before each individual work whether literary or pictorial. The use of title pages announces the piece before the viewer's eye is allowed to glimpse it, separating the work from the other contributions and presenting each individual work as both serious and independent from the whole.

== Page layout ==
The Yellow Book's mise-en-page differed dramatically from contemporary Victorian periodicals: "... its asymmetrically placed titles, lavish margins, abundance of white space, and relatively square page declare The Yellow Book's specific and substantial debt to Whistler". The copious amount of blank space utilized by The Yellow Book brought the magazine simplicity and elegance, stylistically overshadowing the "anaesthetic clutter of the typical Victorian page". The use of white space is positive rather than negative, simultaneously drawing the reader's eye to the blank page as an aesthetic and essentially created object. The first issue of The Yellow Book's prospectus introduces it "as a book in form, a book in substance; a book beautiful to see and convenient to handle; a book with style, a book with finish; a book that every book-lover will love at first sight; a book that will make book-lovers of many who are now indifferent to books".

The decision to print The Yellow Book in Caslon-old face further signified the ties which The Yellow Book held to the Revivalists. Caslon-old face, "an eighteenth-century revival of a seventeenth-century typographical style" became "the type-face of deliberate and principled reaction or anachronism". A type-face generally reserved for devotional and ecclesiastical work, its use in the pages of The Yellow Book at once identified it with the "Religion of Beauty". The use of catch-words on every page enhanced The Yellow Book's link to the obsolescent. Both antiquated and obtrusive, the catch-phrase interrupts the cognitive process of reading: “making-transparent ... the physical sign which constitutes the act of reading; and in doing this, catch-words participate in the ‘pictorialization’ of typography”. By interrupting readers through the very use of irrelevant text, catch-words lend the printed word a solidity of form which is otherwise ignored.

The cover for the final edition of the Yellow Book (published in April 1897) was designed by Mabel Syrett.

== Mentions in literature ==
The Yellow Book is mentioned in W. Somerset Maugham's Of Human Bondage (1915):

They told him about Cronshaw.

"Have you ever read any of his work?"
"No", said Philip.
"It came out in The Yellow Book."

They looked upon him, as painters often do writers, with contempt because he was a layman, with tolerance because he practised an art, and with awe because he used a medium in which themselves felt ill-at-ease.

Maugham also wrote critically about it in his semi-autobiographical work, The Summing Up (1938), commenting "If one takes the trouble to look through the volumes of The Yellow Book, which at that time seemed the last thing in sophisticated intelligence, it is startling to discover how thoroughly bad the majority of its contributors were. For all their parade these writers were no more than an eddy in a backwater and it is unlikely that the history of English literature will give them more than a passing glance."

The Yellow Book is also mentioned in Evelyn Waugh's Put Out More Flags (1942):

It was his misfortune to be respected as a writer by almost everyone except those with whom he most consorted. Poppet and her friends looked on him as a survival from the Yellow Book.

The Yellow Book was parodied in Robert Hichens's 1894 novel The Green Carnation as The Yellow Disaster which contains a drawing by Aubrey Beardsley of the Archbishop of Canterbury sitting in a wheelbarrow consisting of just three lines to form the image. Lord Reginald Hastings (a fictional portrayal of Lord Alfred Douglas) makes the following remark, "What exquisite simplicity!"

In the library of the protagonist of Willa Cather's short story, "Double Birthday" (1929):

There was a complete file of the Yellow Book, for instance; who could extract sweet poison from those volumes now?

John Betjeman's poem "The arrest of Oscar Wilde at the Cadogan Hotel" (1937) describes Wilde as saying:

So you've brought me the latest Yellow Book:
And Buchan has got in it now:
Approval of what is approved of
Is as false as a well-kept vow.

In An Ideal Husband (1895) by Oscar Wilde, Mrs Cheveley (a rather immoral character) says:

I have never read a Blue Book. I prefer books... in a yellow cover.

The book sent by Lord Henry to Dorian Gray in Wilde's novel (widely thought to be Joris-Karl Huysmans' À rebours), which contributes considerably to his descent into corruption, is also described as being

... bound in yellow paper, the cover slightly torn and the edges soiled.

In Max Beerbohm's 1916 short story "Enoch Soames," the narrator (a light caricature of Beerbohm's college self) plumes himself on being chosen to contribute to The Yellow Book: "But ah! hadn't both John Lane and Aubrey Beardsley suggested that I should write an essay for the great new venture that was afoot––"The Yellow Book"?"

== See also ==
- The Hobby Horse
- The Savoy
