= The Long Day =

1905 novel by Dorothy Richardson

The Long Day: The Story of a New York Working Girl, As Told by Herself
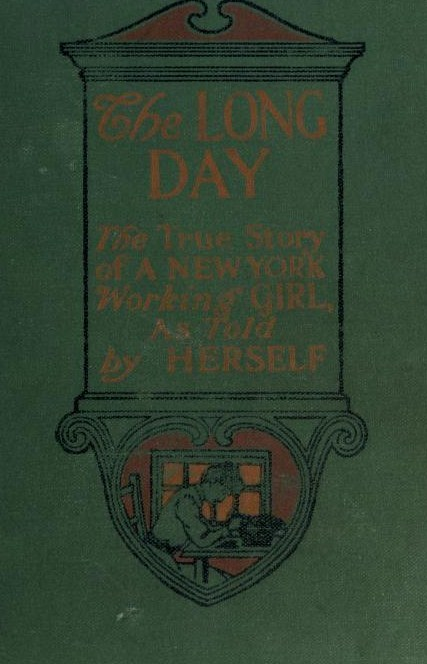
- Author: Dorothy Richardson
- Language: English
- Set in: New York City
- Publisher: Century Company
- Publication date: 1905
- Publication place: United States
- Media type: Print
- Pages: 309
- OCLC: 974131628

The Long Day: The Story of a New York Working Girl, As Told by Herself is a novel by Dorothy Richardson. The book was originally published anonymously in 1905 by Century Company in New York. Dorothy Richardson, who was a middle-class woman born in 1882, was not the same Dorothy Richardson who wrote stream-of-consciousness novels in Great Britain.

== Background ==
The Long Day: The Story of a New York Working Girl, As Told by Herself is a book about the life of a working-class girl. a former teacher in a small town, but who is now alone in New York City, living day-to-day on a few dollars. She lives from boarding house to boarding house, experiencing harsh rules, starvation, and the death of a friend. Furthermore, she works in a number of different positions, including box-making, flower/feather making, sewing, and finally, a shaker. Throughout this time, she learns what it is like to live on a few dollars a week, working twelve-hour shifts with horrible conditions and few breaks. Ultimately, she is able to earn a respectable living as a typewriter.

At the time the book was released, Richardson remained anonymous. "Her book presents itself as the product of an anonymous worker. She never names herself to the reader as a middle-class person venturing into a different world to study it" (Pittenger 26).

== New edition ==
The novel was republished in 1990 by University of Virginia Press (The Long Day: The Story of a New York Working Girl. With an introduction by Cindy Sondik Aron), though this edition is now out of print. The book is split into 16 chapters, with an introduction written by Cindy Sondik Aron. In this introduction, Aron discusses how the protagonist "found working women to be the victims, not of an economic system that limited women’s job opportunities and extracted the most labor for the least pay, but of cultural limitations imposed by their class and of intellectual and physical limitations that allegedly stemmed from their sex". This republication is 344 pages in length.
