= The Great Gay Road (1931 film) =

1931 film

- Directed by: Sinclair Hill
- Written by: Leslie Howard Gordon
- Based on: The Great Gay Road by Tom Gallon
- Produced by: Sinclair Hill
- Starring: Stewart Rome; Frank Stanmore; Kate Cutler
- Cinematography: Desmond Dickinson
- Music by: Horace Shepherd
- Production company: Stoll Pictures
- Distributed by: Butcher's Film Service
- Release date: 21 October 1931
- Running time: 88 minutes
- Country: United Kingdom
- Language: English

The Great Gay Road is a 1931 British drama film directed by Sinclair Hill and starring Stewart Rome, Frank Stanmore and Kate Cutler. It was adapted by Leslie Howard Gordon from the 1910 novel The Great Gay Road by Tom Gallon, which had previously been made into the silent film The Great Gay Road in 1920.

== Preservation status ==
The British Film Institute National Archive holds a collection of ephemera and stills but no film or video materials.

== Plot ==
"Guv'nor" and Crook Perkins are two tramps who stumble across a mansion where a lamp is burning at the door, to welcome Tim, the missing son of Sir Crispen, who left twenty years before. Guv'nor announces himself as the missing son and is accepted as Tim, with Perkins becoming his manservant. "Tim" falls in love with the real Tim's cousin Nancy, but on finding she is already engaged, takes back to the road and joins a circus. Nancy finds him and persuades him to return home, where he meets Sir Crispin's visitor Colonel Trigg, who says that he is not Tim but a Sergeant Kite, who was in his regiment during the war. Tim admits this, and returns again to the road. Perkins later learns that he really is the missing Tim, having enlisted under a false name.

== Cast ==
- Stewart Rome as "Gov'nor" / Hilary Kite
- Frank Stanmore as Crook Perkins
- Kate Cutler as Aunt Jessie
- Arthur Hardy as Sir Crispen
- Pat Paterson as Nancy
- Billy Milton as Rodney
- Hugh E. Wright as Backus
- Frederick Lloyd as Colonel Trigg
- Ethel Warwick as Lizzie
- Wally Patch as Joe
- Petra Charpentier as Laura
- Alf Cordery as Big Jim
- Aubrey Fitzgerald as waiter
- Charles Paton as innkeeper
- Bruce Winston as man in the car

== Production ==
The film was made by Stoll Pictures at Cricklewood Studios. Location filming took place around Tunbridge Wells.

== Reception ==
Film Weekly wrote: "Good average entertainment. ... Apart from Stewart Rome, who is excellent, Pat Patersen does very well as the girl. Arthur Hardy is impressive as a rich grouch with a secret sorrow, and Frank Stanmore supplies conventional broad comedy as a hardened vagabond."

The Daily Film Renter wrote: "Tom Gallon's story is popular, if ingenuous, stuff, and Sinclair Hill has given it very effective screen treatment here, with adequate development of the pictorial side, a clever use of the camera, and a skilful development of humorous side issues. The story, of rather obvious sentimentality, is redeemed by its 'bohemian' background, and Stewart Rome acts very well. The romantic appeal, the pleasing atmosphere, and the humour of the situations and dialogue make it a thoroughly sound popular booking."

Picturegoer wrote: "While not a wholly satisfying interpretation of Gallon's story, there is quite a lot that is entertaining and pleasing in this picture. The English countryside is a welcome setting and the circus life has its amusing side. Stewart Rome's acting has a certain charm, even if it is a little stilted, while that other old favourite, Frank Stanmore, provides good comedy relief, although he is inclined at times to over-emphasise his humour."
