= The Great Gay Road (novel) =

1910 novel by Tom Gallon

- Author: Tom Gallon
- Language: English
- Publication date: 1910

The Great Gay Road is a 1910 novel by British writer Tom Gallon. It inspired the 1918 play The Call of the Road by Mrs George Norman.

The novel has twice been adapted into films: A 1920 silent version The Great Gay Road and a 1931 sound film The Great Gay Road.

== Bibliography ==
- Nicoll, Alardyce. English Drama, 1900-1930: The Beginnings of the Modern Period. Part I. Cambridge University Press, 1973.
