= The Great Gay Road (1920 film) =

1920 film

- Directed by: Norman MacDonald
- Based on: Novel The Great Gay Road by Tom Gallon
- Starring: Stewart Rome, Pauline Johnson, John Stuart
- Release date: 1920
- Country: United Kingdom
- Language: Silent film (English intertitles)

The Great Gay Road is a 1920 British silent drama film directed by Norman MacDonald and starring Stewart Rome, Pauline Johnson and John Stuart. It was an adaptation of a 1910 novel The Great Gay Road by Tom Gallon which was later made as a sound film The Great Gay Road in 1931.

== Cast ==
- Stewart Rome - Hilary Kite
- Pauline Johnson - Nancy
- John Stuart - Rodney Foster
- Ernest Spaulding - Crook Perkins
- A. Bromley Davenport - Sir Crispin Vickrey
- Ralph Forster - Backus
- Helena Lessington - Mother Grogan
