= Ella D'Arcy =

British short story writer (1857–1937)

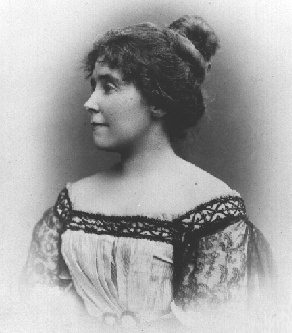
Ella D'Arcy

Ella D'Arcy (Constance Eleanor Mary Byrne D'Arcy) (23 August 1857 – 5 September 1937) was a British short fiction writer in the late 19th and early 20th century.

== Life ==
D'Arcy was born in London to Anthony Byrne Darcey and Sophia Anne Byrne Darcey (née Matthews). One of nine children, she was educated in London, Germany, France and the Channel Islands. Although a student of fine art, D'Arcy abandoned this career, allegedly on the grounds of poor eyesight, in favour of becoming an author.

Living in London, and working as a contributor to, and unofficial editor of, alongside Henry Harland, the Yellow Book, D'Arcy's work is characterised by a psychologically realist style – often attracting comparisons with Henry James – and her determination to engage with themes such as marriage, the family, deception and imitation. Many of her stories also demonstrate the influence of her time in the Channel Islands, most notably "White Magic".

Primarily a writer of short stories, D'Arcy's output is limited. Best known for her short stories in the Yellow Book, recognition of D'Arcy's work grew after the publication of "Irremediable", with The Bookman among others, noting the story as praiseworthy. Alongside her work in the Yellow Book, D'Arcy also published in Argosy, Blackwood's Magazine, and Temple Bar. Her work on the Yellow Book bought her into contact with the publisher John Lane, who initially published her collection of short stories, Monochromes (1895), and went to publish her further works, Modern Instances (1898), and The Bishop’s Dilemma (1898), under the Bodley Head imprint. As well as writing fiction, D'Arcy also translated into English André Maurois's biography of Percy Bysshe Shelley, Ariel (1924).

D'Arcy was notorious for her inability to maintain contact with her friends, exacerbated by her love of travel, often appearing unannounced, earning her the nickname 'Goblin Ella.'

Ella D'Arcy spent much of her life living alone, in relative poverty. Her writing, although demonstrating a real engagement with the changing and challenging artistic styles of the late nineteenth century, was motivated by need. She spent her final years living in Paris, until she returned to London in 1937 and died in a London hospital that year.

== Bibliography ==
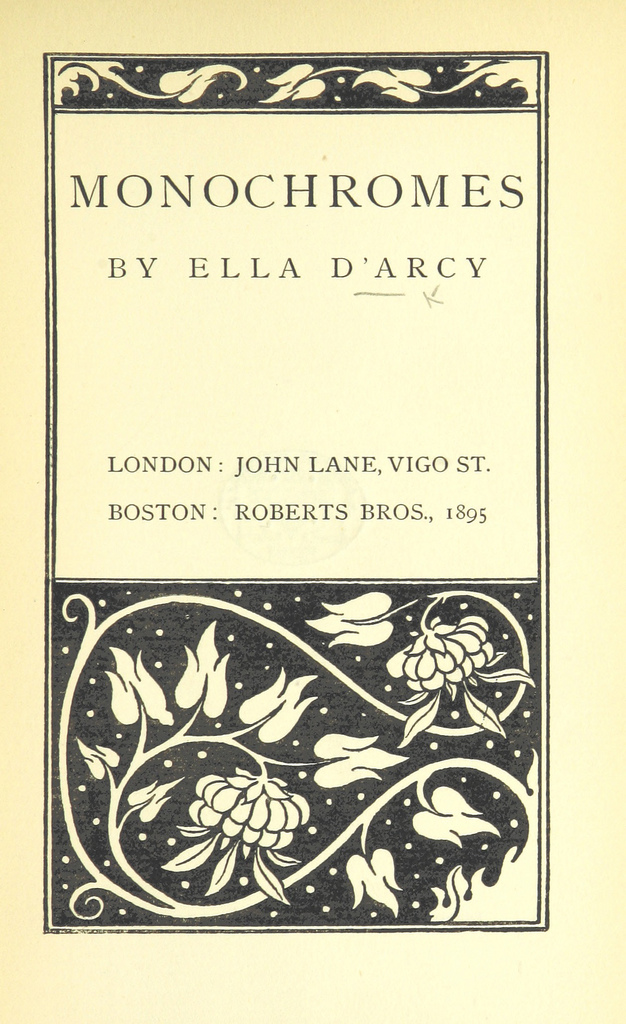

Stories that appeared in The Yellow Book.

- Volume One "Irremediable"
- Volume Two "Poor Cousin Louis"
- Volume Three "White Magic"
- Volume Five "The Pleasure-Pilgrim"
- Volume Eight "An Engagement"
- Volume Ten "Two Stories"
- Volume Eleven "A Marriage"
- Volume Twelve "At Twickenham"
- Volume Thirteen "Sir Julian Garve"

== Other ==
- Monochromes (1895)
- Modern Instances (1898)
- The Bishop's Dilemma (1898)
- Ariel (1924) (trans)
