= Double Birthday =

1929 short story by Willa Cather

- Short story by Willa Cather
- Country: United States
- Language: English
- Genre: Short story

Publication
- Published in: The Forum
- Publication type: Magazine
- Publication date: February 1929

"Double Birthday" is a short story by Willa Cather. It was first published in The Forum in February 1929.

== Plot introduction ==
Albert is organizing a birthday party for his uncle soon.

=== Explanation of the title ===
Although the birthday party is for Uncle Albert, it is also Albert's birthday.

== Plot summary ==
In Pittsburgh, Judge Hammersley runs into Albert, who says it is soon to be his uncle's birthday; the judge says he should come round to his house before, so he can give him some alcohol. Back home, he tells his daughter he has run into him; she goes off to a ball. Meanwhile, the two Alberts are playing classical music and reading decadent literature.

In an analepsis, the reader gets an account of Uncle Albert when he was working as a throat doctor in Allegheny. He once came upon a singer whom he wanted to bring to New York City, since he believed her to be very talented. However, after graduation, she eloped to Chicago, but eventually came back and was fairly successful until she came down with a throat disease, which proved fatal.

Albert goes to Judge Hammersley's to get the alcohol. He is greeted by Margaret, and they talk about the time they spent in Rome when they were younger. Her father gives him two bottles of champagne. Later, Margaret comes to the birthday party and Albert tells her about the last time he saw their former music teacher, Rafael Joseffy, noting that he was sick. Finally, they toast to Lenore, the singer Uncle Albert had brought to success in New York.

== Characters ==
- Judge Hammersley
- Albert Englehardt. He was named after his uncle 'because [I] was born on his twenty-fifth birthday'.
- Uncle Albert, Albert's uncle.
- Judge Merriman
- Margaret Parmenter, Judge Hammersley's daughter.
- Gus Englehardt, Albert's late father.
- Mrs Rudder, Uncle Albert's cleaning-lady.
- Marguerite Thiesinger, a soprano that Uncle Albert brings to fame in New York City.
- Elsa, Mrs's Rudder's granddaughter.
- Carl Abberbock, Elsa's husband.
- Rafael Joseffy, Albert's quondam music teacher.
- Mrs Sterrett

== Allusions to actual history ==
- Albert mentions Prohibition in the United States, under the Eighteenth Amendment to the United States Constitution.
- Uncle Albert's father is said to have been 'a gallant officer in the Civil War'.
- The First World War is mentioned as having divested the youth of all kinds of hope.
- Dictators Napoleon Bonaparte and Benito Mussolini are mentioned.
- Martin Luther is dismissed as 'a vulgarian of the first water'.

== Allusions to other works ==
- Music is alluded to with Robert Schumann's Kreisleriana, Igor Stravinsky, Claude Debussy's Pelléas et Mélisande, Johann Sebastian Bach, Johannes Brahms, Wilhelm Gericke, Manuel Patricio Rodríguez García, Adelina Patti, Pauline García-Viardot, Emma Eames, and Geraldine Farrar. Jazz is also mentioned.
- The Decadent movement is mentioned, with direct references to The Yellow Book, Aubrey Beardsley, Ernest Dowson, Oscar Wilde.
- Other works of literature mentioned are Harriet Beecher Stowe's 1856 novel Dred: A Tale of the Great Dismal Swamp, Heinrich Heine, Friedrich Schiller.
- Painting is mentioned with Raphael. Cubism is also mentioned.
- Mephistopheles is also briefly alluded to.
