= Tom Gallon =

British playwright and novelist (1866–1914)

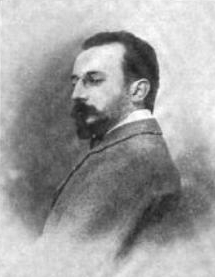
- In The Sketch, 19 December 1900
- Born: Thomas Henry Gallon; 5 December 1866; Bermondsey, London, England
- Died: 4 November 1914 (aged 47); London, England
- Occupation: Writer

Thomas Henry Gallon (5 December 1866 – 4 November 1914) was a British playwright and novelist. He was the brother of author and publicist Nellie Tom-Gallon, who founded the Tom-Gallon Trust Award for beginning writers in memory of her brother.

== Biography ==
Tom Gallon was born in Bermondsey, London, the son of John P. Gallon (an engineer, fitter and turner) and his wife Martha K. Gallon.

Several of Tom Gallon's novels were adapted as films including The Princess of Happy Chance (1916), Meg the Lady (1916), The Cruise of the Make-Believes (1918), The Lackey and the Lady (1919), A Rogue in Love (1922), Boden's Boy (1923), Off the Highway (1925, based on Tatterley), The Great Gay Road (1920, silent) and The Great Gay Road (1931, sound).

He died in London on 4 November 1914.

== Selected works ==
=== Novels ===
- Tatterley (1897)
- The Golden Thread (1904)
- Meg the Lady (1905)
- Jimmy Quixote (1906)
- The Dream And The Woman (1909)
- The Great Gay Road (1910)
- The Touch of A Child (1910)
- The Mystery of Roger Bullock (1910)
- The Rogue's Heiress (1910)
- As He was Born (1911)
- Dead Man's Love (1911)
- By the Name of Miss Smith (1912)
- Levity Hicks (1912)
- Memory Corner (1912)
- Young Eve and Old Adam (1913)
- "It Will Be All Right!" (1914)
- The Man in Motley (1915)
- The Princess of Happy Chance (1915)
- The Diamond Trail (1916)
- The Man Hunt (1916)
- The Lady in the Black Mask (1917)

=== Plays ===
- The Man Who Stole the Castle, by Gallon and Leon M. Lion (Garrick Theatre, 1900)
- Memory's Garden (1902)
- Lady Jane's Christmas Party (Garrick Theatre, 1904)
- Law and Order (Palace Theatre, 1908)
- The Great Gay Road (Court Theatre, 1911)
- Aurora's Captive (Prince of Wales Theatre, 1913)
- All's Fair (Tivoli Musichall, 1913)
- Felix Gets a Month, Gallon and Lion (Haymarket Theatre, 1917)
- Pistols For Two, Gallon and Lion (Coliseum, 1917)
