= Meg the Lady (film) =

- Directed by: Maurice Elvey
- Written by: Tom Gallon (novel)
- Starring: Elisabeth Risdon; Fred Groves; Eric Stuart
- Production company: London Films
- Distributed by: Jury Films
- Release date: January 1916
- Country: United Kingdom
- Languages: Silent; English intertitles

Meg the Lady is a 1916 British silent crime film directed by Maurice Elvey and starring Elisabeth Risdon, Fred Groves and Eric Stuart. The film is based on the 1905 novel of the same name by Tom Gallon.

== Cast ==
- Elisabeth Risdon as Lady Brisby
- Fred Groves as Giles Curwen
- Eric Stuart as Teddy

== Bibliography ==
- Goble, Alan. The Complete Index to Literary Sources in Film. Walter de Gruyter, 1999.
