= The Diary of a Lost Girl =

1905 novel by Margarete Böhme

- 1907 edition

The Diary of a Lost Girl (German: Tagebuch einer Verlorenen) is a book by the German author Margarete Böhme (1867–1939). It purportedly tells the true story of Thymian, a young woman forced by circumstance into a life of prostitution. When first published in 1905, the book was said to be a genuine diary, though speculation quickly arose as to its authorship.

Due in part to its sensational subject matter, the book proved extremely popular. By the end of the 1920s, it had sold more than 1,200,000 copies, ranking it among the bestselling books of its time. One contemporary scholar has called it "[p]erhaps the most notorious and certainly the commercially most successful autobiographical narrative of the early twentieth century".

== Publishing history ==
Böhme's book was first published in 1905 as Tagebuch einer Verlorenen, Von einer Toten (The Diary of a Lost Girl, by One Who is Dead), by F. Fontane & Co., a leading German publisher. More than 30,000 copies were sold within the first four months of publication. Less than two years later, in 1907, a deluxe edition was issued marking more than 100,000 copies in print.

Within a few years, Tagebuch einer Verlorenen was translated into 14 languages. Interest was so great there were even pirated versions in both Poland and the Netherlands. The book remained in print more than 25 years, until it was driven out-of-print by groups seeking to suppress it at the beginning of the Nazi era. Ironically, as a young man, Nazi leader Heinrich Himmler noted in his diary that he had read the book, and claimed that it offered "insight into dreadful human tragedies and makes one look at many a whore with very different eyes."

== Controversy ==
Today, Tagebuch einer Verlorenen is accepted as a work of fiction. However, when it first published, the book was believed to be the actual diary of a young woman. Böhme claimed only to be the editor of the manuscript. Controversy arose over the story revealed in the book. In Tagebuch einer Verlorenen, Thymian turns to a life of prostitution after being seduced by her father's assistant and suffering the scorn of her family and neighbors.

The book's publication and newsworthy sales led to speculation as to its actual author. Readers, critics, and the press were divided. Böhme and her publisher always maintained their account of the origins of the book. Some early editions even depict manuscript pages said to be in Thymian's hand. Belief in its authenticity continued in some quarters for decades.

== Legacy and adaptions ==
In 1907, Böhme published Dida Ibsens Geschichte (The History of Dida Ibsen), a popular sequel to Tagebuch einer Verlorenen. As Böhme states in the book's foreword, Dida Ibsens Geschichte was written in response to the flood of letters she received regarding the earlier book. Some readers had even written to Böhme asking where Thymian was buried.

A five-act stage play based on Tagebuch einer Verlorenen was authored by Wolf von Metzlch-Schilbach. It was published in 1906. Performances of the play were banned in some German cities. In 1906, a parody of Böhme's book was also published. Rudolf Felseck's Tagebuch einer andern Verlorenen, Auch von einer Toten featured a similar title and a look-alike design. In the wake of the success of Tagebuch einer Verlorenen, a number of similarly themed, lower class, women's autobiographies were also published. At least a few of these latter books cited Böhme's work.

Two silent films were made in Germany based on Tagebuch einer Verlorenen. The first, from 1918, was directed by Richard Oswald and was based on his adaption of Böhme's book. It starred Erna Morena as Thymian. In 1929, G.W. Pabst directed the second film version of Tagebuch einer Verlorenen. It starred Louise Brooks as Thymian. In France, a novelization of the 1929 film was also issued. Brooks, in the role of Thymian, appears on the cover of this latter book, which was authored by Rene Wild.

The philosopher and literary critic Walter Benjamin wrote about the book. And the American novelist Henry Miller included The Diary of a Lost One on his list of the books which influenced him the most.

== Critical response ==
Tagebuch einer Verlorenen was widely discussed and written about. Criticism of the time focused on both its controversial story as well as its contested authorship. Many German reviewers praised the book.

Some years later, in his 1946 book From Caligari to Hitler: A Psychological History of the German Film, the critic Siegfried Kracauer commented on the Pabst film and its literary source – "the popularity of which among the philistines of the past generation rested upon the slightly pornographic frankness with which it recounted the private life of some prostitutes from a morally elevated point of view".

In the British Isles, the book was praised by the bestselling man of letters Hall Caine. "It is years since I read anything of the kind that moved me to so much sympathy and admiration. . . . It is difficult for me to believe that a grown man or woman with a straight mind and a clean heart can find anything that is not of good influence in this most moving, most convincing, most poignant story of a great-hearted girl who kept her soul alive amidst all the mire that surrounded her poor body". However, Caine's friend, Dracula author Bram Stoker, was said to have been in favor of banning the book.

In the United States, the book's leading champion was the Anglo-American writer Percival Pollard, who praised it in two of his books of criticism. Pollard stated "The fact that one German critic asserted the impossibility of a woman herself immune from vice having written such a book, is proof that besides truth of matter there was compelling art in Margarete Böhme’s book".

== Translations ==
In England, the book was issued in 1907 as The Diary of a Lost One. It was first advertised as The Diary of a Lost Soul, the title given it by its translator, the Irish author Ethel Colburn Mayne (1865-1941). Because of its subject matter, however, Mayne elected not to have her name appear on the book. (The English and American editions share the same translation.) The authorized Polish edition was translated by the noted writer Felicja Nossig (1855-1939). The unauthorized Dutch translation was by the poet Hillegonda van Uildriks (1863-1921). After having been out-of-print in English for more than 100 years, the book was reissued in the United States as The Diary of a Lost Girl in 2010.

- Dnevnik Jedne Izgubljene (Croatia)
- Dennik padlého dĕvčete (Czechoslovakia)
- Fortabt (Denmark)
- The Diary of a Lost One (England)
- Journal d’une fille perdue (France)
- Yhteiskunnan Hylkäämä (Finland)
- Egy Tévedt Nö Naplója (Hungary)
- Diario di una donna perduta da una morta (Italy)
- Förtappad (Sweden)
- Pamiętnik Kobiety Upadłej (Poland) by Małgorzata Böhme / translated by Felicja Nossig
- Pamiętnik Uwiedzionej (Poland – unauthorized edition) by Małgorzata Böhme
- Eene verloren ziel (The Netherlands)
- Thymian (The Netherlands – unauthorized edition)
- The Diary of a Lost One (United States)
- The Diary of a Lost Girl (United States)
- Днeвникъ Павшей (U.S.S.R)
- דער טאגע־בוך פון א פארלארענע (United States) translated into Yiddish by Leon Kobrin
