= Meg the Lady (novel) =

1905 novel by Tom Gallon

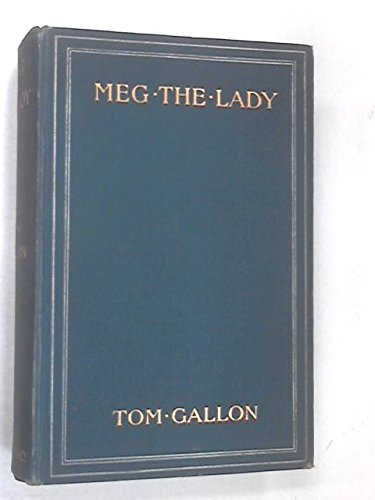
- Author: Tom Gallon
- Language: English
- Genre: Novel
- Publication date: 1905
- Publication place: United Kingdom
- Media type: Print

Meg the Lady is a 1905 melodramatic novel by the British writer Tom Gallon. In 1916 it was adapted into a film of the same title directed by Maurice Elvey.

== Bibliography ==
- Goble, Alan. The Complete Index to Literary Sources in Film. Walter de Gruyter, 1999.
