= Henry Harland =

American novelist (1861–1905)

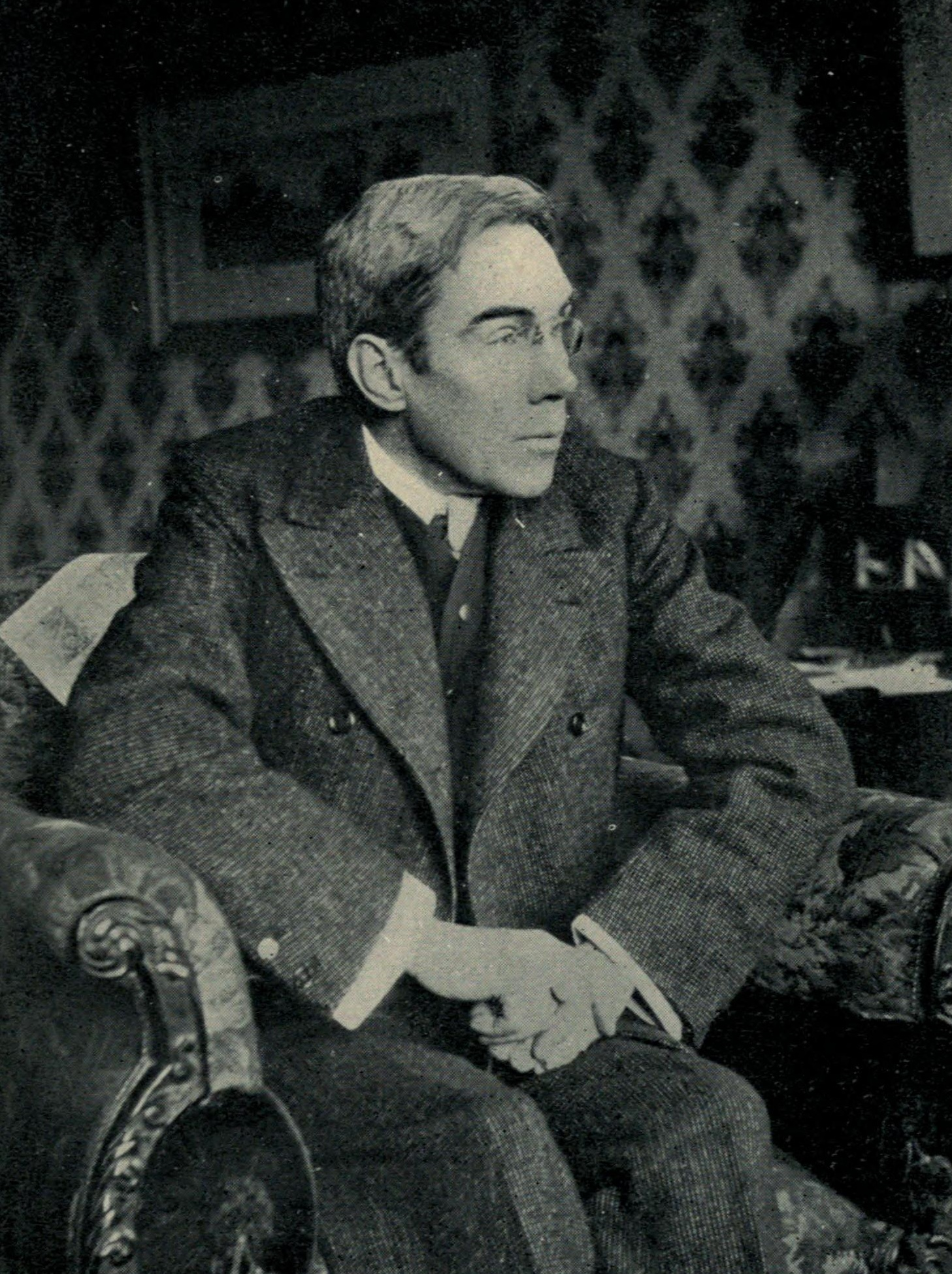
- Born: March 1, 1861; Norwich, Connecticut
- Died: December 20, 1905 (aged 44); Sanremo, Italy
- Occupations: Novelist, editor
- Spouse: Aline Herminie Merriam
- Writing career
- Pen name: Sidney Luska

Henry Harland (March 1, 1861 – December 20, 1905) was an American novelist and editor.

== Biography ==
Harland was born in Norwich, Connecticut, (Note: Harland often claimed to have been born in Saint Petersburg, which is reflected in multiple contemporary reference works such as Who's Who in America, but later scholars have discounted this.) in 1861, the son of Fourierist Thomas Harland, who had been a one-time roommate of editor and author Edmund Clarence Stedman. He was raised in New York and, after the Civil War, the Harlands lived in a German Jewish section of the city.

Harland attended the City College of New York and briefly Harvard Divinity School. In May 1884, he married Aline Herminie Merriam, who shared his artistic interests. His literary career falls into two distinct sections. During the first of these, writing under the pseudonym Sidney Luska, he produced a series of highly sensational novels, written with little regard to literary quality. His novels written under this persona in the 1880s became the first popularly-read books to feature the American Jewish experience, which Harland both celebrated and criticized. Harland's depictions were met with wide criticism from the Jewish community. One review in the Philadelphia-based Jewish Exponent said one of his books was "grossly inartistic" and expressed "condescension" and "vulgar assumption towards Jews". Kaufmann Kohler in The Menorah complained that, in Harland's novels "the Jews, as a class, lack refinement".

But in 1889 Harland moved to London and fell under the influence of the Aesthetic movement. He began writing under his own name and, in 1894, became the founding editor of The Yellow Book. The short story collections of this new period, A Latin-Quarter Courtship (1889), Mademoiselle Miss (1893), Grey Roses (1895), and Comedies and Errors (1898), were praised by critics but had little general popularity. He finally achieved a wide readership with The Cardinal's Snuff-box (1900), which was followed by The Lady Paramount (1901) and My Friend Prospero (1903). Hamlin Garland met him around this time and noted that he had affected a fake English accent. Garland recalled, "his 'extraoinary' English accent was comical. He spoke quite like the caricatured Englishman of our comedy stage. He is completely expatriated now and unpleasantly aggressive in his defense of England and English ways."

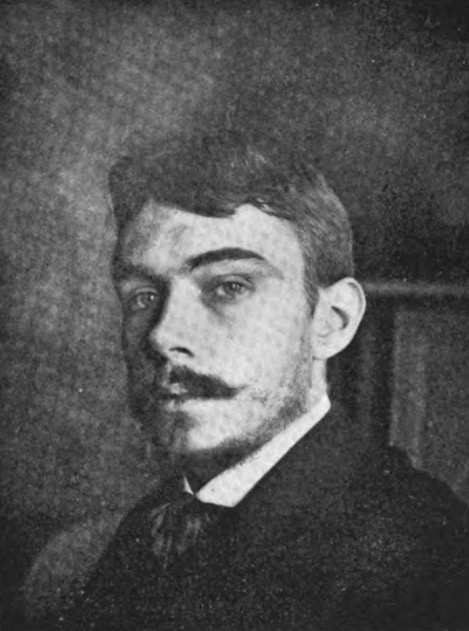
Harland in March 1895 edition of The Bookman (New York City)

Harland's last novel, The Royal End (1909), was incomplete when he died. His wife finished it according to his notes. He died in 1905 at Sanremo, Italy, after a prolonged period of tuberculosis.

After his death, Henry James wrote positively about both Harland and The Yellow Book, though he had previously disparaged both.

== Works ==
- As It Was Written: A Jewish Musician's Story (1885) by Sidney Luska
- Mrs Peixada (1886) by Sidney Luska
- The Yoke Of The Thorah (1887) by Sidney Luska
- My Uncle Florimond (1888) by Sidney Luska (Henry Harland)
- A Latin-Quarter Courtship, and Other Stories (1889) by Sidney Luska (Henry Harland)
- Grandison Mather (1889) by Sidney Luska (Henry Harland)
- Two Women or One? From the Mss. of Dr. Leonard Benary (1890) by Henry Harland (Sidney Luska)
- Two Voices (1890) by Henry Harland (Sidney Luska) Contents: “Dies Irae”, “De Profundis”.
- Fantasy (1890) by Matilde Serao, translated by Henry Harland and Paul Sylvester
- Mea Culpa: A Woman’s Last Word (1891)
- Mademoiselle Miss, and Other Stories (1893)
- The Yellow Book, An Illustrated Quarterly (1894–1897) Harland was literary editor for the entire run of 13 volumes, and contributed a number of (mostly) pseudonymous pieces.
- Grey Roses (1895)
- Comedies and Errors (1898)
- The Cardinal's Snuff-Box (1900)
- The Lady Paramount (1902)
- My Friend Prospero (1903)
- The Royal End: A Romance (1909) Completed by Harland's widow, Aline.
- The Light Sovereign (1917) with Hubert Crackanthorpe

== Notes ==
- The Oxford Companion to American Literature. 6th Edition. Edited by James D. Hart, revised by Phillip W. Leininger. New York & Oxford: Oxford University Press, 1996. p. 271. ISBN 0-19-506548-4.
- Foote, Stephanie. "Ethnic Plotting: Henry Harland and the Jewish Writer." American Literature. March 2003 (75:1): 119–140.
