= Margarete Böhme =

German writer (1867–1939)

- Böhme in 1902
- Born: 8 May 1867; Husum, Prussia (now Germany)
- Died: 23 May 1939 (aged 72); Othmarschen, Germany
- Occupations: novelist, journalist
- Writing career
- Genres: bildungsroman, picaresque

Margarete Böhme (8 May 1867 – 23 May 1939) was, arguably, one of the most widely read German writers of the early 20th century. Böhme authored 40 novels – as well as short stories, autobiographical sketches, and articles. The Diary of a Lost Girl, first published in 1905 as Tagebuch einer Verlorenen, is her best known and bestselling book. By the end of the 1920s, it had sold more than a million copies, ranking it among the bestselling books of its time. One contemporary scholar has called it “Perhaps the most notorious and certainly the commercially most successful autobiographical narrative of the early twentieth century.”

== Early life and work ==
Böhme was born Wilhelmina Margarete Susanna Feddersen in 1867. The future writer grew up in Husum, a small town in Northern Germany. Husum was dubbed “the grey town by the grey sea” by its best known resident, the novelist and poet Theodor Storm. Her mother's aunt was Lena Wies, a storyteller and longtime friend of Storm who furnished the novelist with legends and tales for his later work.

Böhme began writing early. At age 17, she published her first story, “The Secret of the Rose Passage,” in a Hamburg newspaper. She then went on to place her work in weekly magazines, both under her own name and under the pseudonym, Ormanos Sandor. Later, while living in Hamburg and Vienna, Böhme worked as a correspondent for North German and Austrian newspapers.

In 1894, the author married Friedrich Theodor Böhme, a newspaper publisher 20 years her senior. After six years, the marriage ended in divorce. Böhme then moved to Berlin, where she attempted to make her living as an author.

Böhme wrote prolifically. She wrote articles and essays as well as short stories for the newspapers and magazines of the time. Some of her early novels were serialized in periodicals, and others were issued in book form by German publishers. At first, Böhme wrote what would today be termed popular fiction – but as her work matured, she turned to more serious themes.

Beginning in 1903, Böhme wrote six novels in the span of two years. Few of them, however, met with much success. With the publication of Tagebuch einer Verlorenen in 1905, the author's fortunes changed. The book was an overnight success, and Böhme's reputation was secured. Her succeeding books were met with serious consideration, translated into other languages, and widely reviewed. At the time, Böhme's work was favorably compared to that of the French writer Émile Zola. An American literary review, The Bookman, described Böhme as “One of the leading novelists of the younger realistic school in Germany.”

== Tagebuch einer Verlorenen ==
Tagebuch einer Verlorenen was a literary sensation. It purportedly tells the true story of Thymian, a young woman forced by circumstance into a life of prostitution. When it was first published, it was believed to be a genuine diary, and Böhme claimed only to be its editor. The book's publication and subsequent success led to speculation as to its authorship.

Tagebuch einer Verlorenen was translated into 14 languages. There was such demand for the book that there were pirated versions in at least two countries. The book brought about not only a popular sequel, a controversial stage play banned in some German cities, a parody, and two silent films (one in 1918, and one in 1929) - but a score of imitators as well. Lawsuits arose around its publication, and the book, widely discussed, had some small influence on social reform in Germany.

Due in part to its sensational subject matter, as well as its contested nature, the book proved extremely popular. More than 30,000 copies were sold within the first four months of publication. Less than two years later, in 1907, a deluxe edition was issued marking more than 100,000 copies in print. By 1929, more than 1,200,000 copies had been published. The book remained in circulation for more than 25 years, until deliberately being driven out of print at the beginning of the Nazi era.

== Later work ==
Dida Ibsens Geschichte (1907), is a kind of sequel to Tagebuch einer Verlorenen. As Böhme states in the forward, the book was written in response to a flood of letters she received regarding the earlier book. Dida Ibsens Geschichte was made into a film of the same name in 1918.

W.A.G.M.U.S. (1911) is considered by some critics to be Bohme's best work. It is the story of a department store. The novel chronicles the growth of a colossal business which crushes its smaller competitors by systematically underselling them. It was published in America, where one leading review called it “a distinctly remarkable book.”

Much of Böhme's later fiction has a strong social message. Christine Immersen (1913), concerns the harsh working conditions faced by women telephone operators (then just coming onto the scene). Sarah von Lindholm (1914), puts forth progressive ideas on the role of the worker. Kriegsbriefe der Familie Wimmel (1915), written during the early days of the First World War, reflects the realities of that conflict. Rheinzauber (1909), focuses on a family feud which ends after three generations when a child brings its hostile branches together. It gained Böhme one of her few American notices when it was reviewed in The Nation in a round-up of German-language books.

Only two of Böhme's books were translated into English. They are Tagebuch einer Verlorenen, as The Diary of a Lost One in 1907 - and W.A.G.M.U.S., as The Department Store in 1912. Each was first issued in Great Britain and then the United States. The Department Store was also published in Canada. British editions of The Diary of a Lost One and The Department Store are known to have circulated throughout the countries of the British commonwealth. For example, in 1909, the Nelson Evening Mail in New Zealand described The Diary of a Lost One as "one of the saddest of modern books."

Böhme continued to publish throughout the 1910s and 1920s. By 1937, however, her name no longer appeared in annuals devoted to German literature. The author died on May 23, 1939, at the age of 72.

== Selected works ==
Today, almost all of Böhme's books are out of print. In 1988, a facsimile of the deluxe 1907 edition of Tagebuch einer Verlorenen was published in Germany. It was followed in 1995 by a soft cover edition of the book with Louise Brooks (who played the role of Thymian in the 1929 G.W. Pabst film) on the cover. In 2009, a small anthology of Böhme's work was published under the title Margarete Böhme - Einblicke: Eine Annäherung an ihr Werk. And in 2010, the original English language translation of Tagebuch einer Verlorenen was brought back into print as The Diary of a Lost Girl.

- Im Irrlichtschein (1903)
- Zum Gluck (1903)
- Fetisch (1904)
- Abseites vom Wege (1904)
- Wenn der Fruhling kommit (1904)
- Tagebuch einer Verlorenen (1905)
- Des Gesetzes Erfüllung (1905)
- Die grunen Drei (1905)
- Mieze Biedenbachs Erlebnisse (1906)
- Dida Ibsens Geschichte (1907)
- Apostel Dodenscheit (1908)
- Die graue Strasse (1908)
- Rheinzauber (1909)
- W.A.G.M.U.S. (1911)
- Im weissen Kleide (1912)
- Christine Immersen (1913)
- Anna Nissens Traum (1913)
- Sarah von Lindholm (1914)
- Kriegsbriefe der familie Wimmel (1915)
- Siebengestirne (1915)
- Millionenrausch (1919)
- Lukas Weidenstrom (1921)
- Maianne Wendels Leidensgang (1922)
- Frau Ines Firnenwanderung (1922)
- Meine Schuld, meine grosse Schuld (1922)
- Roswitha (1923)
- Narren des glucks (1923)
- Die Heirat der Mieze Biedenbach (1923)
- Anna Nissens Traum (1924)
- Frau Bedfords Tranen (1924)
- Die Maienschneider (1925)
