= Buber-Rosenzweig-Medal =

The Buber-Rosenzweig-Medaille is an annual prize awarded since 1968 by the Deutscher Koordinierungsrat der Gesellschaften für Christlich-Jüdische Zusammenarbeit (DKR; German Coordinating Council of Societies for Christian-Jewish Cooperation) to individuals, initiatives, or institutions, which have actively contributed to Christian–Jewish understanding. Forty-four different societies belong to the DKR. The name of the prize honors the memory of the Austrian-Jewish philosopher, translator, and educator Martin Buber (1878–1965) and the German-Jewish theologian Franz Rosenzweig (1886–1929). In its inaugural year, the prize was granted to both the historian Friedrich Heer (Gottes erste Liebe; God's First Love) and the Protestant theologian Friedrich-Wilhelm Marquardt (Die Entdeckung des Judentums für die christliche Theologie: Israel im Denken Karl Barths; The Discovery of Judaism for Christian Theology: Israel in the Thought of Karl Barth).

== Recipients ==
- 1968 Friedrich Heer, Vienna / Friedrich-Wilhelm Marquardt, Berlin
- 1969 Ernst Simon, Jerusalem
- 1970 Eva Gabriele Reichmann, London / Rabbi Robert Raphael Geis, Düsseldorf
- 1971 Bishop Kurt Scharf, Berlin
- 1972 Monsignor Antonius Cornelis Ramselaar, Utrecht
- 1973 Helmut Gollwitzer, Berlin
- 1974 Hans G. Adler, London
- 1975 Archbishop George Appleton, Jerusalem and Wantage / Abbot Laurentius Klein, Jerusalem
- 1976 Ernst-Ludwig Ehrlich, Basel
- 1977 Friedrich Dürrenmatt
- 1978 Grete Schaeder, Göttingen / Albrecht Goes, Stuttgart
- 1979 Manès Sperber, Paris / James Parkes, Southampton
- 1980 Eugen Kogon, Königstein / Gertrud Luckner, Freiburg im Breisgau
- 1981 Isaac Bashevis Singer, New York
- 1982 Schalom Ben-Chorin, Jerusalem
- 1983 Helene Jacobs, Berlin
- 1984 Siegfried Theodor Arndt, Leipzig / Helmut Eschwege, Dresden
- 1985 Franz Mußner, Passau
- 1986 Heinz Kremers, Duisburg
- 1987 Neve Shalom, Israel
- 1988 Israel Studies Working Group
- 1989 Yehudi Menuhin
- 1990 Charlotte Petersen, Dillenburg
- 1991 Leo Baeck Education Center, Haifa
- 1992 Hildegard Hamm-Brücher, Munich / Annemarie Renger, Bonn
- 1993 Aktion Sühnezeichen Friedensdienste (ASF) (Action Reconciliation/Service For Peace, ARSP)
- 1994 Jakob Petuchowski, Cincinnati) / Clemens Thoma, Lucerne)
- 1995 Richard von Weizsäcker, Berlin
- 1996 Franklin Hamlin Littell, United States / Joseph Walk, Jerusalem
- 1997 Hans Koschnick
- 1998 Leah Rabin
- 1999 Archbishop Henryk Muszyński, Gniezno
- 2000 Johannes Rau
- 2001 Schule ohne Rassismus - Schule mit Courage (School without Racism - School with Courage)
- 2002 Edna Brocke, Essen / Rolf Rendtorff, Karben / Johann Baptist Metz, Münster
- 2003 Joschka Fischer
- 2004 Daniel Barenboim
- 2005 Peter von der Osten-Sacken
- 2006 Leon de Winter and the Show Your Face! Association
- 2007 Esther Schapira and Georg M. Hafner
- 2008 Stef Wertheimer
- 2009 Erich Zenger
- 2010 Daniel Libeskind
- 2011 Navid Kermani
- 2012 Nikolaus Schneider
- 2013 Mirjam Pressler, Landshut / Fritz-Bauer-Institut, Frankfurt a.M.
- 2014 Gyorgy Konrád, Budapest
- 2015 Hanspeter Heinz, Augsburg / Gesprächskreis "Juden und Christen" beim Zentralkomitee der deutschen Katholiken, Bonn
- 2016 Micha Brumlik
- 2017 Konferenz Landeskirchlicher Arbeitskreise Christen und Juden (KLAK)
- 2018 Peter Maffay, Tutzing
- 2019 Kreuzberger Initiative gegen Antisemitismus (KIgA), Berlin, and the Netzwerk für Demokratie und Courage (NDC), Dresden
- 2020 Angela Merkel, Berlin
- 2021 Christian Stückl
- 2022 Peter Fischer (President Eintracht Frankfurt) and Makkabi Deutschland
- 2023 Stiftung Neue Synagoge Berlin – Centrum Judaicum
- 2024 Igor Levit
- 2025 Saba-Nur Cheema and Meron Mendel
- 2026 Christian Rutishauser

== See also ==
- Gesellschaft für Christlich-Jüdische Zusammenarbeit Kassel (Society for Christian-Jewish Cooperation Kassel)
- Authorship of the Bible
- List of religion-related awards
