= Rudi Fehr =

German-American film editor (1911–1999)

- Rudi Fehr with his wife
- Born: Rudolf Alexander Fehr; July 6, 1911; Berlin, Germany
- Died: April 16, 1999 (aged 87); Los Angeles, California
- Occupations: Film editor & executive
- Years active: 1931–1985
- Spouse: Maris Wrixon (m. 1940)
- Children: Kaja Fehr

Rudolf "Rudi" Fehr (July 6, 1911 – April 16, 1999) was a German-born American film editor and studio executive. He had more than thirty credits as an editor of feature films including Key Largo (1946), Dial M for Murder (1954), and Prizzi's Honor (1985). He worked for more than forty years for the Warner Brothers film studio, where he was the Head of Post-production from 1955 through 1976. Fehr was instrumental in establishing the 1967 "sister city" connection between Los Angeles and Berlin, which he had fled in the 1930s.

== Life and career ==
Fehr was born in Berlin, Germany. He aspired to become a diplomat or a musician, but was recruited into the film industry, and edited his first film, Der Schlemihl, in 1931; he was just 20 years old. He then worked for several years with the producer Sam Spiegel, including work in Austria and England. In 1933 he edited the French language film Le Tunnel, which was directed by Curtis Bernhardt. In 1935 he worked on the editing of the Buster Keaton film The Invader.

In 1936, Fehr, who was Jewish, fled the Nazi regime in Germany and moved to United States, travelling first class in April 1936 on the steamship, Washington. He landed a job at the Warner Brothers film studio in Hollywood, where he initially worked to substitute English sound tracks on two films for the original German ones. He soon became an assistant editor to Warren Low. His first Hollywood editing credit was for the film My Love Came Back (1940); the film was directed by Curtis Bernhardt, who had worked with Fehr seven years earlier on Le Tunnel. For the next fifteen years Fehr edited dozens of studio films, including A Stolen Life (directed by Curtis Bernhardt and starring Bette Davis, 1946) and Key Largo (directed by John Huston, starring Humphrey Bogart, and introducing Lauren Bacall, 1948).

In his obituary, Allen Eyles notes two 1946 films as representative of Fehr's work, "Many of his films were routine, but A Stolen Life (1946) had the visual intricacy of Bette Davis playing the dual role of two sisters, initially on screen at the same time, and Humoresque (also 1946) presented John Garfield as an outstanding violinist, dubbed by Isaac Stern. Garfield had to be carefully filmed and edited as he couldn't play a note. He kept his arms behind his back in close-ups while a member of the studio orchestra perched on each side of him, their hands coming into frame to do the fingering and bowing."

Jack L. Warner, the co-founder of the Warner Brothers film studio, had briefly assigned Fehr to production duties in 1952. Fehr then edited two films directed by Alfred Hitchcock, I Confess (1953) and Dial M for Murder (1954). Following Dial M for Murder (1954), Warner appointed Fehr as the Head of Post-production including the editing department. Hitchcock made his next films for Paramount Pictures, where George Tomasini became Hitchcock's principal editor in an important collaboration.

Fehr was Head of Post-production at Warner Bros. until his own retirement in 1976; he had worked for the studio for forty years, and reached its mandatory retirement age of 65. The studio then hired Fehr back, and he went to Europe to supervise foreign-language adaptations of Warner Bros. films in France, Germany, Italy and Spain. In 1980, Fehr became Head of Post-production for American Zoetrope, which was Francis Ford Coppola's production company. In 1981, Fehr was co-editor for Coppola's One from the Heart (1982); it was his first editing credit since 1954. In 1985, he co-edited John Huston's Prizzi's Honor, which was his last film credit.

Fehr taught film editing and post-production at the University of California - Los Angeles and at the California Institute of the Arts in the 1990s.

== Beyond the film industry ==
Fehr was the co-founder (with fellow refugee Ernest Herman) of the Los Angeles-West Berlin Sister City Committee. In 1967 Los Angeles became the first sister city of West Berlin; the connection continued after the 1989 reunification of Germany and of East and West Berlin.

During his long residence in California, Fehr amassed a collection of thousands of music recordings. Selections from his collection were used by Peter Bogdanovich to provide authentic music from the 1930s for the film Paper Moon (1973); one curator wrote that "the soundtrack for Bogdanovich's Paper Moon is nothing more, or less, than one rare Fehr disc after another.

Fehr became an American citizen in February, 1941. He was married to actress Maris Wrixon, whom he had met while they were both working on Million Dollar Baby (1941). They had three daughters. Fehr died of a heart attack in Los Angeles in 1999; Wrixon died less than a year later.

== Honors ==
Fehr, along with his co-editor (and daughter) Kaja Fehr, were nominated for the Academy Award for Best Film Editing for Prizzi's Honor (1985).

In 1983, Fehr was awarded the Grand Medal of Merit by the president of West Germany, which acknowledged Fehr's work in establishing the sister city relationship of West Berlin and Los Angeles. In 1986, he was a member of the jury at the 36th Berlin International Film Festival. Fehr served as a board member of the Motion Picture Editors Guild. In 1990 Fehr received the Order of Merit of Berlin, again recognizing his work on establishing the city partnership with Berlin.

Fehr had been selected as a member of the American Cinema Editors shortly after its founding in 1950, and in 1993 he received the American Cinema Editors Career Achievement Award.

== Selected filmography ==
The director and release year of each film are indicated in parentheses.

- Unsichtbare Gegner (Katscher-1933). Produced by Sam Spiegel. A German and a French language film (Les requins du pétrole) were produced simultaneously; Fehr was also credited as co-editor for the latter. Phillis Fehr is sometimes credited for editing this film, but this appears to be mistaken. She edited no other films, and Rudi Fehr indicated in interviews that he was the co-editor.
- Le Tunnel (Bernhardt-1933). French and German language versions were filmed at the same time. Fehr is credited as the editor only for the French version, although apparently Gottlieb Madl, the editor credited for the German language version Der Tunnel, largely followed Fehr's editing. Fehr's first Hollywood editing credit was with the same director, Curtis Bernhardt.
- Honeymoon for Three (Bacon-1941)
- Desperate Journey (1942)
- Watch on the Rhine (Shumlin-1943). Shumlin, who had directed the play, was new to filmmaking, and Fehr was on the set to guide the camera placements.
- Dial M for Murder (Hitchcock-1954).
