= Crooks in Tails =

Crooks in Tails (German:Gauner im Frack) may refer to:

- Crooks in Tails (1927 film), a silent German film directed by Manfred Noa
- Crooks in Tails (1937 film), a German film directed by Johannes Riemann
