= Eugen Schüfftan =

German cinematographer (1893-1977)

Eugen Schüfftan (21 July 1893 – 6 September 1977) was a German cinematographer.

== Biography ==
Eugen Schüfftan

Schüfftan was born on 21 July 1893 in Breslau, Silesia, German Empire (now Wrocław, Poland). He invented the Schüfftan process, a special effects technique that employed mirrors to insert actors into miniature sets. One of the early uses of the process was for Metropolis (1927), directed by Fritz Lang. The technique was widely used throughout the first half of the 20th century until it was supplanted by the travelling matte and bluescreen techniques.

== Career ==
Schüfftan began his career in Berlin as a painter of Impressionist paintings, then turned to Expressionism and then worked as an architect and decorative painter. The artist came to film via detours. In 1923, his fascination for the camera and camera techniques led him to the mirror animation process, which later became named after him, which became famous in 1924 with Fritz Lang's film epic Die Nibelungen (The Nibelungs) and was used on a large scale for the first time in Metropolis (1927). The arrangement of one or more partially transparent mirrors made it possible to depict miniature models behind actors as huge buildings. Eugen Schüfftan initially became technical director at Deutsche Spiegeltechnik GmbH & Co., but after a few years he handed over his post to the film architect Fritz Maurischat in order to devote himself again to his work as a cameraman.

In 1930, Schüfftan was the cinematographer in charge of the documentary Menschen am Sonntag, directed by Robert Siodmak and Billy Wilder. As a result of the National Socialists' seizure of power, his work was soon massively restricted. Schüfftan emigrated to France, where he filmed with Marcel Carné (A Strange Case and Harbour in the Fog), among others. After the occupation of France, he emigrated to the USA, where he was able to continue his work.

In the film Hitler's Madman (1942/1943), director Sierck wanted him as a cameraman, but Schüfftan did not get a work permit for the USA because the local cameramen's association A.S.C. refused him membership. Therefore, an American photographer named Jack Greenhalgh received credit, while Schüfftan was de facto solely responsible for photographing the film. In technical professions, the American trade unions were anxious to protect the interests of their members, which is why emigrated cameramen such as Schüfftan and Curt Courant found difficulty being employed in film productions.

Schüfftan won the 1962 Academy Award for Best Cinematography, Black-and-White for his work on the film The Hustler.

He died on 6 September 1977 in New York City.

== Selected filmography ==
Year	Film	Director	Notes
1924	Die Nibelungen	Fritz Lang	
1927	Metropolis	Fritz Lang	
1927	Napoléon	Abel Gance	
1930	People on Sunday	Curt Siodmak, Robert Siodmak, Edgar G. Ulmer, Fred Zinnemann	
1930	Farewell	Robert Siodmak	
1930	The Stolen Face	Philipp Lothar Mayring, Erich Schmidt	
1931	The Street Song	Lupu Pick	
1931	The Scoundrel	Eugen Schüfftan, Franz Wenzler	
1931	My Wife, the Impostor	Kurt Gerron	
1931	I'd Rather Have Cod Liver Oil	Max Ophüls	
1932	Coeurs joyeux	Hanns Schwarz, Max de Vaucorbeil	
1932	The Mistress of Atlantis	Georg Wilhelm Pabst	
1932	Gypsies of the Night	Hanns Schwarz	
1932	L'Atlantide	Georg Wilhelm Pabst	
1932	Queen of Atlantis	Georg Wilhelm Pabst	
1932	The Faceless Voice	Leo Mittler	
1933	The Oil Sharks	Rudolf Katscher	
1933	Du haut en bas	Georg Wilhelm Pabst	
1933	Läufer von Marathon	Ewald André Dupont	
1933	Invisible Opponent	Rudolf Katscher	
1934	The Scandal	Marcel L'Herbier	
1934	The Crisis is Over	Robert Siodmak	
1934	Irish Hearts	Brian Desmond Hurst	
1935	The Invader	Adrian Brunel	
1935	Children of the Fog	John Quin and Leopold Jessner	
1935	La Tendre ennemie	Max Ophüls	
1936	The Robber Symphony	Friedrich Feher	
1936	Komedie om geld	Max Ophüls	
1936	María de la O	Francisco Elías	With Carmen Amaya and Pastora Imperio
1937	Bizarre, Bizarre	Marcel Carné	
1937	The Cheat	Marcel L'Herbier	
1937	Yoshiwara	Max Ophüls	
1938	The Novel of Werther	Max Ophüls	
1938	Port of Shadows	Marcel Carné	
1938	Mollenard	Robert Siodmak	
1944	It Happened Tomorrow	René Clair	
1950	The Hunted	Borys Lewin	
1952	The Road to Damascus	Max Glass	
1953	The Venus of Tivoli	Leonard Steckel	
1954	A Parisian in Rome	Erich Kobler	
1955	Ulysses	Mario Camerini	
1958	Head Against the Wall	Georges Franju	
1960	Eyes Without a Face	Georges Franju	
1961	The Hustler	Robert Rossen	
1961	Something Wild	Jack Garfein	
1963	Captain Sindbad	Byron Haskin	
1964	Lilith	Robert Rossen	

== See also ==
- List of German-speaking Academy Award winners and nominees
