= Louis de Wohl =

German–Hungarian writer and astrologer (1903–1961)

- Born: Lajos Theodor Gaspar Adolf Wohl; 24 January 1903; Berlin, German Empire
- Died: 2 June 1961 (aged 58); Lucerne, Switzerland

Louis de Wohl (earlier Ludwig von Wohl, born Lajos Theodor Gaspar Adolf Wohl, 24 January 1903 – 2 June 1961) was a German-born Catholic author.

De Wohl wrote novels which were literary hagiographies of notable Roman Catholic saints and of different periods of the Bible.

His works have been translated into twelve languages, and sold over one million copies worldwide. He also served as an astrologer notable for his work with MI5 in England during World War II.

== Life ==
Wohl was born in Berlin to a poor Catholic family and had a Hungarian father and Austrian mother of Jewish descent. When he was only 17 years old, his mother pushed him into an apprenticeship to a banker from which he was dismissed in 1924, at the age of 21. In 1935, he emigrated to England because of his objections to the Nazi regime. Some sources claim that he there had a wife named Alexandra, who fled to Santiago, Chile, where she claimed to be a Romanian princess and was known as "La Baronessa".

Wohl worked as an astrologer for the British intelligence agency MI5 during World War II. His MI5 file was released in early 2008. He was recruited initially by Sir Charles Hambro, then running the Special Operations Executive, to devise black propaganda for use against Germany, and allegedly as an informant because he was casting horoscopes for people of interest to MI5. In May 1941 he was sent to America to contribute to astrological magazines and newspapers which at the time were using articles by astrologers favourable to Nazi Germany.

In the United States, Wohl published many articles, lectured against Germany, and was interviewed several times by the press. He then returned to England in February 1942 and claimed that he had been promised a commission in the British Army. Sefton Delmer, a notable purveyor of black propaganda, arranged a fake document certifying de Wohl as a Captain in the British Army, and he took to wearing the uniform though he refrained when he realized the position was untenable. His main value to Delmer was his contact with Karl Ernst Krafft, the German astrologer working in Berlin for Dr Goebbels. He assisted Delmer in forging copies of Krafft's magazine Zenit, German, and other astrological magazines dropped over Germany, and 'foretelling' the destruction of U-boats. Delmer nevertheless continued to employ him until the end of the war and considered his contribution valuable.

During the war, Wohl became increasingly religious, and he had a successful postwar career writing novels regarding Roman Catholic Church history and the lives of the saints.

In 1953, Wohl married Ruth Magdalene Lorch, who was a Lady Commander of the Order of the Holy Sepulchre. He himself held the title of Knight Commander of the Order.

Wohl died in Switzerland in 1961, shortly after finishing his final work, Founded on a Rock.

== Writing career ==
He began writing as early as the age of 7. His teachers praised his ability. At the age of 8 he wrote the play "Jesus of Nazareth" because he did not like how Jesus was portrayed by some books he read. Writing as Ludwig von Wohl, he became quite a successful novelist during his youth in Germany, where sixteen of his novels were turned into films. The best known of these was the 1934 comedy classic Die englische Heirat (The English Marriage).

In an audience with Pope Pius XII, he was told to "write about the history and mission of the Church in the World". The Cardinal of Milan, Ildefonso Schuster, said to him after reading some of his writings, "Let your writings be good. For your writings you will one day be judged". From that time, he allegedly believed that he had to write for God, and felt that his earlier novels in the German language were of 'small significance compared to the novels he wrote for the glory of God'.

His novel The Spear brought him international acclaim. Even now Louis de Wohl's books are widely read. His non-fiction work, Founded on a Rock: A History of the Catholic Church is often required reading for RCIA students. He wrote books on St. Benedict, St. Francis of Assisi, Joan of Arc, and Constantine I among many others.

== List of works ==
- Der große Kampf, 1926
- Das indische Wunder – Jack McGills geheime Sendung, 1926
- Der Präsident von Costa Nueva – Der Roman eines Abenteurers, 1927
- Miss Lillebil aus USA, 1928
- Lord Spleen, 1928
- Knockout Europa, 1928
- Punks kommt aus Amerika, 1929
- Er und Sie und sehr viel Schwindel, 1929
- Die verspielte Prinzessin – Ein Filmroman zwischen Berlin, Hollywood und Kairo, 1929
- Um weißes Gift, 1930
- Der Vagabund vom Äquator, 1930
- Das Testament des Cornelius Gulden, 1930
- Die Wohnung, die über Nacht verschwand, 1931
- Die Göttin der tausend Katzen, 1931
- Der Mann, der die Anleihe stahl, 1931
- Der Mann aus der Hölle, 1931
- Peter im Pech, 1932
- Die weiße Frau des Maharadscha, 1932
- Die goldene Wolke, 1932
- Der unsichtbare Reporter, 1932
- Schwarz ist weiß und weiß ist schwarz, 1933
- Kopfsprung ins Leben, 1933
- Das große Erlebnis, 1933
- Panik im Paradies, 1934
- Die Reise nach Pretoria, 1934
- Die englische Heirat, 1934
- Die Deutschen von Tschau-Fu, 1934
- Blutsbrüder, 1934
- Tropenluft, 1935
- Es kommt ein Mann nach Belawan – Ein Roman auf Sumatra, 1935
- Die Türme des Schweigens, 1936
- I Follow my Stars, 1937
- Secret Service of the Sky, 1938
- Common-sense Astrology, 1940
- Strange Daughter, 1946
- The Living Wood (Emperor Constantine and St. Helena), 1947
- Throne of the World (Attila the Hun and Pope Leo I), 1949
- Imperial Renegade (Emperor Julian the Apostate and St. Athanasius), 1950
- The Quiet Light (St. Thomas Aquinas), 1950
- The Restless Flame (St. Augustine of Hippo), 1951
- The Golden Thread (St. Ignatius Loyola), 1952
- The Stars of War & Peace, 1952
- Set All Afire (St. Francis Xavier), 1953
- The Second Conquest, 1954
- The Spear (St. Longinus), 1955
- The Last Crusader (Don Juan of Austria and The Battle of Lepanto), 1956
- Saint Joan: The Girl Soldier (St. Joan of Arc), 1957
- The Glorious Folly (St. Paul the Apostle), 1957
- The Joyful Beggar (St. Francis of Assisi), 1958
- Citadel of God (St. Benedict of Nursia), 1959
- Adam, Eve, and the Ape, 1960
- Founded on a Rock: A History of the Catholic Church, 1961
- Lay Siege to Heaven (St. Catherine of Siena), 1961
- David of Jerusalem (King David), 1963
- Pope Pius XII: Shepherd to the World

== Selected filmography ==
- My Friend Harry, directed by Rudolf Walther-Fein and Max Obal (1928, based on the novel Das indische Wunder)
- The Criminal of the Century, directed by Max Obal (1928, based on the novel Jimmy der Schwerverbrecher)
- The President, directed by Gennaro Righelli (1928, based on the novel Der Präsident von Costa Nueva)
- A Girl with Temperament, directed by Victor Janson (1928, based on the novel Miss Lillebil aus USA)
- Once You Give Away Your Heart, directed by Johannes Guter (1929, based on the novel Der Vagabund vom Äquator)
- Die Jagd nach der Million, directed by Rudolf Walther-Fein and Max Obal (1930, based on the novel Lord Spleen)
- The Testament of Cornelius Gulden, directed by E. W. Emo (1932, based on the novel Das Testament des Cornelius Gulden)
- The Legacy of Pretoria, directed by Johannes Meyer (1934, based on the novel Die Reise nach Pretoria)
- The English Marriage, directed by Reinhold Schünzel (1934, based on the novel Die englische Heirat)
- Punks Arrives from America, directed by Karlheinz Martin (1935, based on the novel Punks kommt aus Amerika)
- The Love of the Maharaja, directed by Arthur Maria Rabenalt (German-language version, 1936, based on the novel Die weiße Frau des Maharadscha)
  - A Woman Between Two Worlds, directed by Goffredo Alessandrini (Italian-language version, 1936, based on the novel Die weiße Frau des Maharadscha)
- Crime Over London, directed by Alfred Zeisler (1936, based on the novel House of a Thousand Windows)
- Francis of Assisi, directed by Michael Curtiz (1961, based on the novel The Joyful Beggar)

=== Screenwriter ===
- The Sweet Girl (dir. Manfred Noa, 1926)
- Crooks in Tails (dir. Manfred Noa, 1927)
- The Eighteen Year Old (dir. Manfred Noa, 1927)
- The Last Company (dir. Curtis Bernhardt, 1930)
- Love's Carnival (dir. Hans Steinhoff, 1930)
- Adventures in the Engadin (dir. Max Obal, 1932)
- The Oil Sharks (French-language version, dir. Rudolph Cartier and Henri Decoin, 1933)
  - Invisible Opponent (German-language version, dir. Rudolph Cartier, 1933)
- Homecoming to Happiness (dir. Carl Boese, 1933)
- Decoy (German-language version, dir. Hans Steinhoff, 1934)
  - The Decoy (French-language version, dir. Roger Le Bon and Hans Steinhoff, 1935)
- Make-Up (dir. Alfred Zeisler, 1937)
- Dein Horoskop – Dein Schicksal? (documentary on astrology, dir. Konrad Lustig, 1956)
