= Esther Schapira =

German journalist and filmmaker (born 1961)

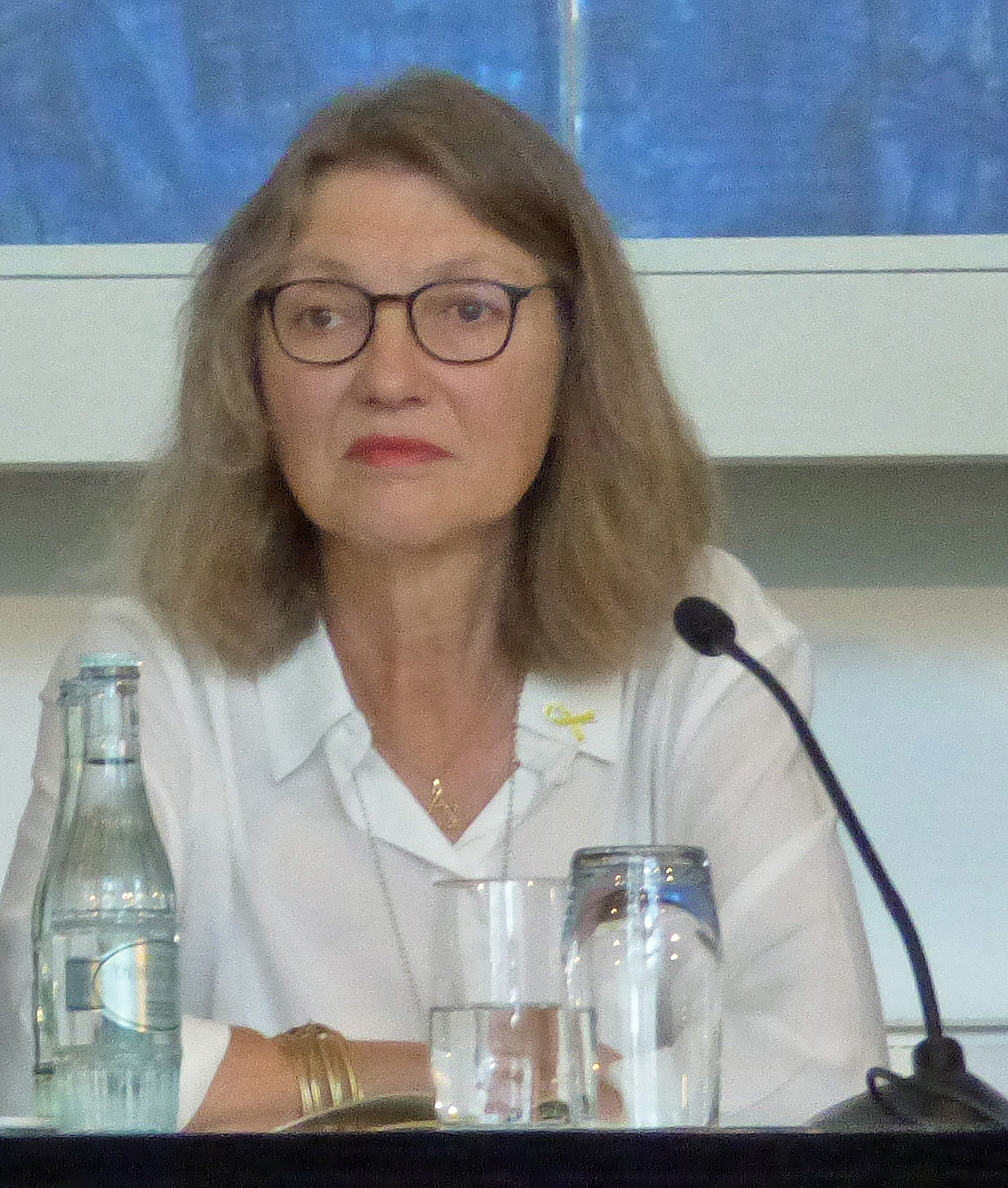
- Born: January 23, 1961 (age 65); Frankfurt, West Germany
- Occupations: Journalist, filmmaker

Esther Schapira (born January 23, 1961, in Frankfurt) is a German journalist and filmmaker, currently politics and society editor at the German public television network, the Hessischer Rundfunk.

Schapira is co-author of The Act of Alois Brunner, and producer of two award-winning documentaries, Drei Kugeln und ein totes Kind ("Three bullets and a dead child") (2002), about the death of Muhammad al-Durrah in Gaza in 2000, and Der Tag, als Theo van Gogh ermordet wurde ("The day Theo van Gogh was murdered") (2007), about the killing in 2004 of Dutch filmmaker, Theo van Gogh. The latter won her and her co-producer, Kamil Taylan, a Prix Europa award. In 2009, she produced a second documentary about the death of al-Durrah, Das Kind, der Tod und die Wahrheit ("The Child, the Death, and the Truth").

== Background ==
Schapira completed her Abitur at the Frankfurt Helmholtzschule in 1982, and went on to study German and English language and literature, as well as theatre, film and television. She has been the politics and society editor at the German public television network, the Hessischer Rundfunk, since 1995.

== Awards ==
Schapira's awards include the Elisabeth-Selbert-Preis (1987), the Radio-, TV- und Neue-Medien-Preis (1995), the German Critics Prize (1996), and the Civis – Europas Medienpreis für Integration prize (2002). She won the first prize twice at the International Festival Law and Society in Moscow, for Drei Kugeln und ein totes Kind and Der Tag, als Theo van Gogh ermordet wurde. In 2007, she won the Buber-Rosenzweig-Medal with Georg M. Hafner, and a commendation during Prix Europa for the Theo van Gogh documentary.

== Books ==
- with Hafner, Georg M. Die Akte Alois Brunner. Campus Sachbuch, Frankfurt 2000. ISBN 978-3-499-61316-6
- with Hafner, Georg M. Israel ist an allem schuld. Warum der Judenstaat so gehasst wird. Eichborn, Köln 2015, ISBN 3-8479-0589-9

=== Articles ===
- Weil ich ein Märtyrer sein will. Begegnung mit einem Terroristen, in: Robertson-von Trotha, Caroline Y. (ed.): Tod und Sterben in der Gegenwartsgesellschaft. Eine interdisziplinäre Auseinandersetzung (= Kulturwissenschaft interdisziplinär/Interdisciplinary Studies on Culture and Society, Vol. 3), Baden-Baden 2008. ISBN 978-3-8329-3171-1
