= The Love and Death of Cornet Christopher Rilke =

Prose poem by Rainer Maria Rilke

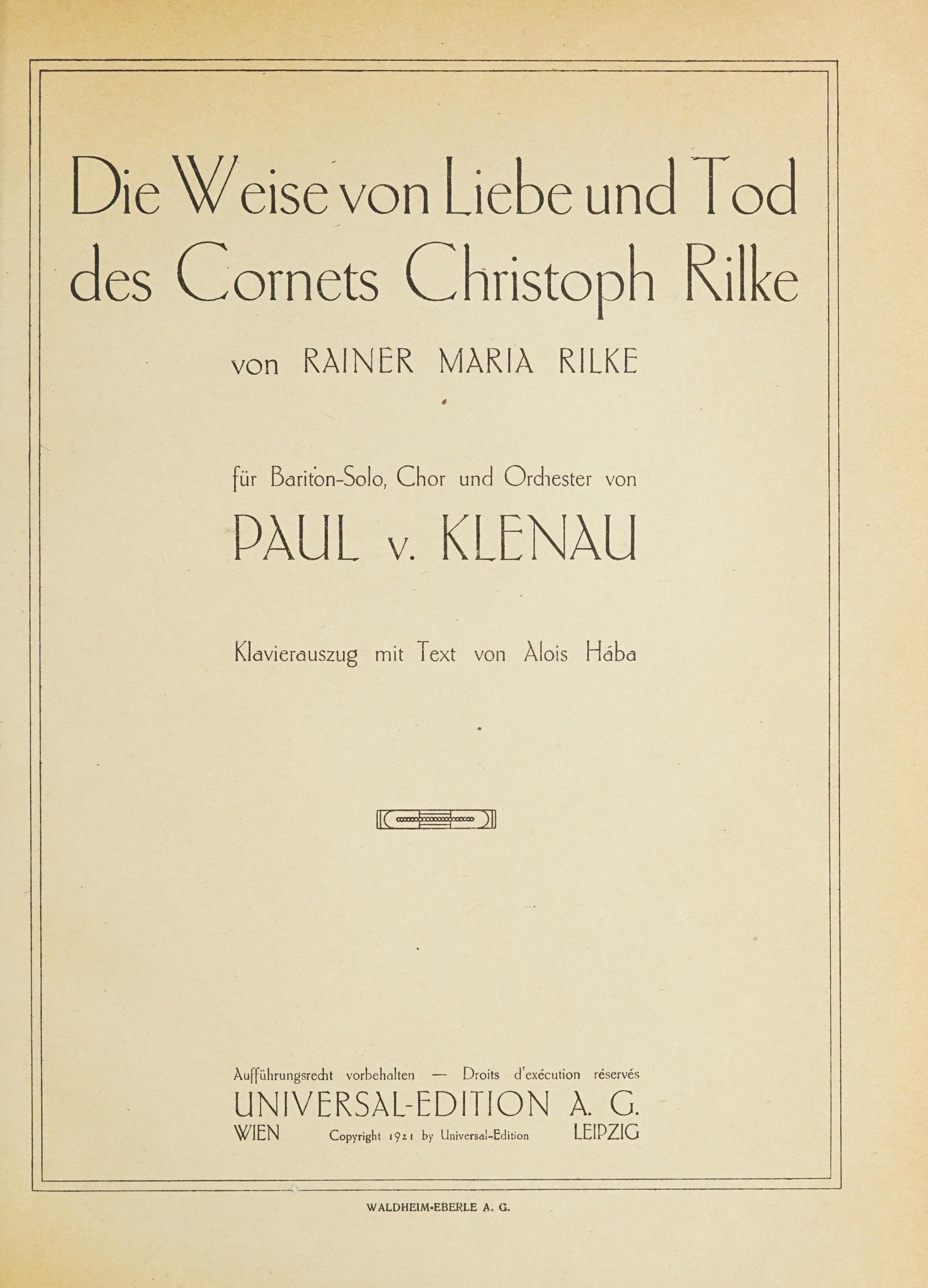
- Title page for Die Weise von Liebe und Tod des Cornets Christoph Rilke (1912)
- Author: Rainer Maria Rilke
- Original title: Die Weise von Liebe und Tod des Cornets Christoph Rilke
- Translator: M. D. Herter Norton
- Language: German
- Genre: Prose poem
- Publisher: Insel Verlag
- Publication date: 1912
- Publication place: Austria-Hungary

The Love and Death of Cornet Christopher Rilke is a prose poem written by Rainer Maria Rilke in 1899, revised in 1906, and published in 1912. Rilke wrote the poem after finding a document in his uncle Jaroslav's papers concerning Christopher Rilke, a man who Rainer's family erroneously believed to be an ancestor and who "died as a cornet in the baron of Pirovano's company of the Imperial Austrian Heyster Regiment of Horse." The poem recounts the adventures of Christopher Rilke, who travels with a company of soldiers and then, after a night in a castle with a lover, fights and dies in a war in Turkey and is mourned by an old woman.

Cornet was a tremendous success for Rilke, selling 5,000 copies in three weeks and leading to another print run of 20,000. The success of Cornet surprised Rilke. He came to believe that it was an inferior work, but it stayed in publication throughout his lifetime. While Rilke and others have questioned its quality, Judith Ryan calls it a "key text for understanding Rilke's professional development.".

== Adaptations ==
In March 1919, Kurt Weill performed a symphonic version of the poem in Berlin.

The 1955 West German film The Cornet is based on the work.

The composer Viktor Ullmann wrote a melodrama based on the work in 1942.

The work was set to music by the Swiss composer Frank Martin in 1943.

The American composer Earl Kim wrote Cornet, for Narrator and Orchestra based on the text in 1983.

The work received its UK premiere as part of the Stefan Zweig Series at London’s Wigmore Hall on May 7th, 1997 with pianist William Howard and narrator Walter van Dyk.

The work was set to music by the American composer Lisa Bielawa premiering March 22, 2006, in Alice Tully Hall at Lincoln Center in New York and recorded one year later by Innova Recordings.
