= Anne Frank House =

Writer's house and museum in Amsterdam

The Anne Frank House
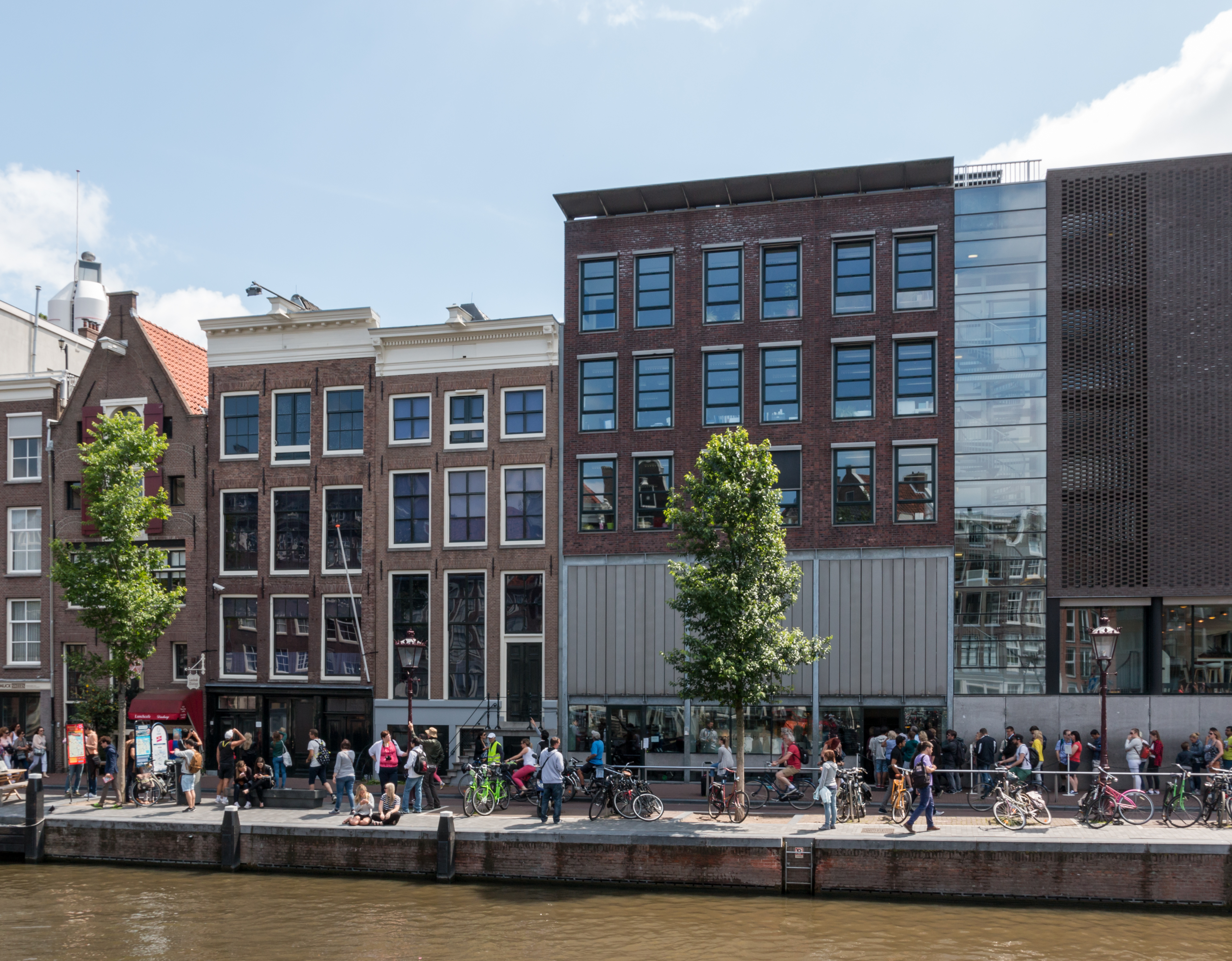
- Canal house and museum entrance in 2015 (has black facade at ground level)

- Location in the city centre of Amsterdam
- Established: 3 May 1960
- Location: Prinsengracht 263-267; Amsterdam, Netherlands
- Coordinates: 52.37525°N 4.88432°E
- Type: Biographical museum Historic house museum
- Visitors: 1,208,327 (2024)
- Founder: Otto Frank
- Director: Ronald Leopold
- Public transit access: Westermarkt; Trams lines: 13, 14, 17; Bus lines: 170, 172, 174
- Website: www.annefrank.org

The Anne Frank House (Dutch: Anne Frank Huis) is a writer's house and biographical museum dedicated to Jewish wartime diarist Anne Frank. The building is located on the Prinsengracht, close to the Westerkerk, in central Amsterdam in the Netherlands.

During World War II, when the Netherlands was occupied by Germany, Anne Frank hid from Nazi persecution with her family and four other people in hidden rooms, in the rear building, of the 17th-century canal house, later known as the Secret Annex (Dutch: Achterhuis). She did not survive the war but her wartime diary was published in 1947. Ten years later, the Anne Frank Foundation was established to protect the property from developers who wanted to demolish the block.

The entire museum, which occupies the three adjacent buildings on the street front of Prinsengracht 263 to 267, opened on 3 May 1960. It preserves the hiding place (the Secret Annex at rear of 263), with the other buildings expanding the permanent exhibition on the life and times of Anne Frank, and has an exhibition space about all forms of persecution and discrimination. In 2017, the museum had 1.27 million visitors and was the third most visited museum in the Netherlands, after the Van Gogh Museum and the Rijksmuseum.

== Building history ==
=== Canal house ===
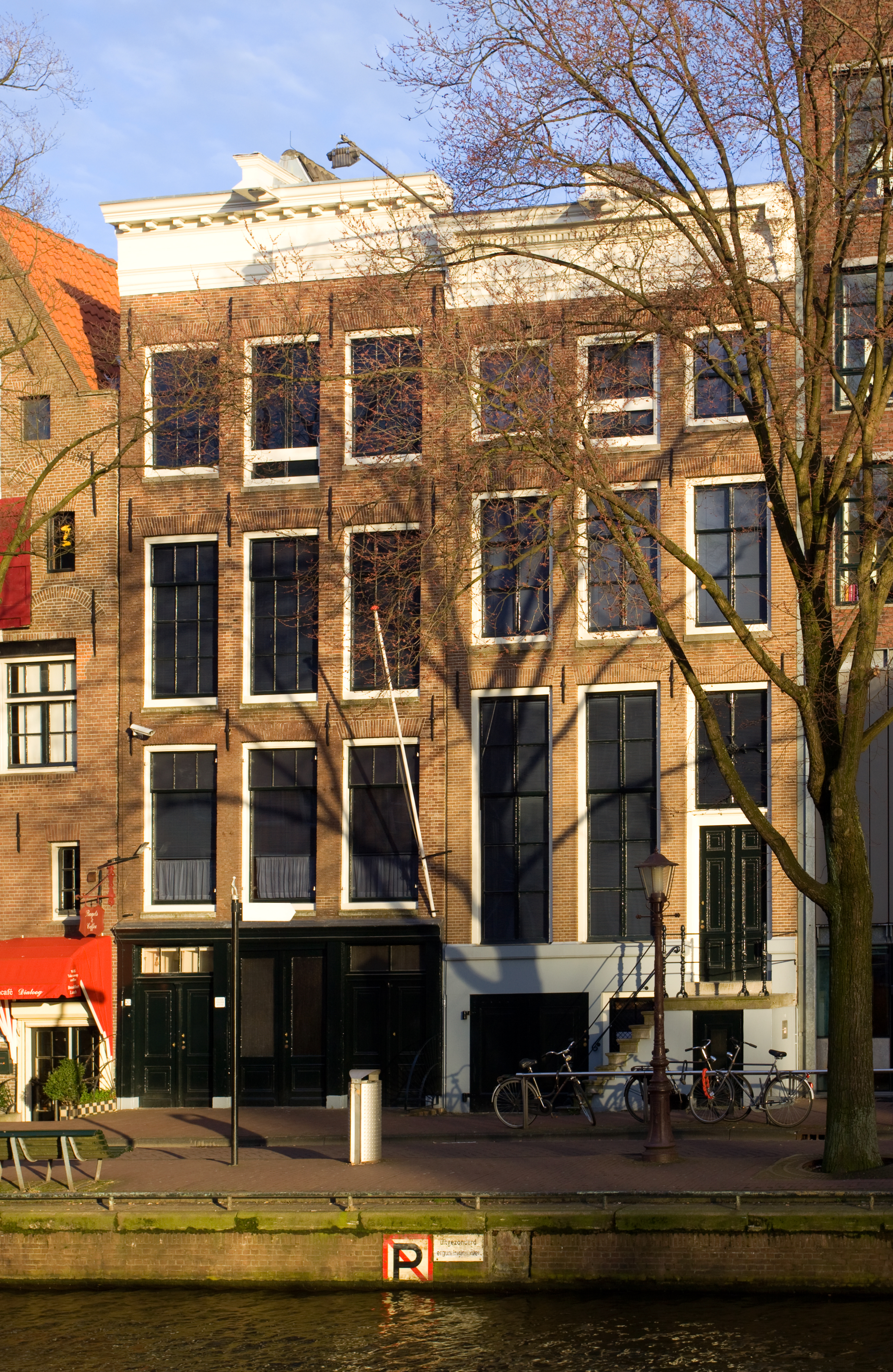
Canal-side façade of the former Opekta building on Prinsengracht canal in 2008. The Secret Annex (Achterhuis) is at the rear in an enclosed courtyard.

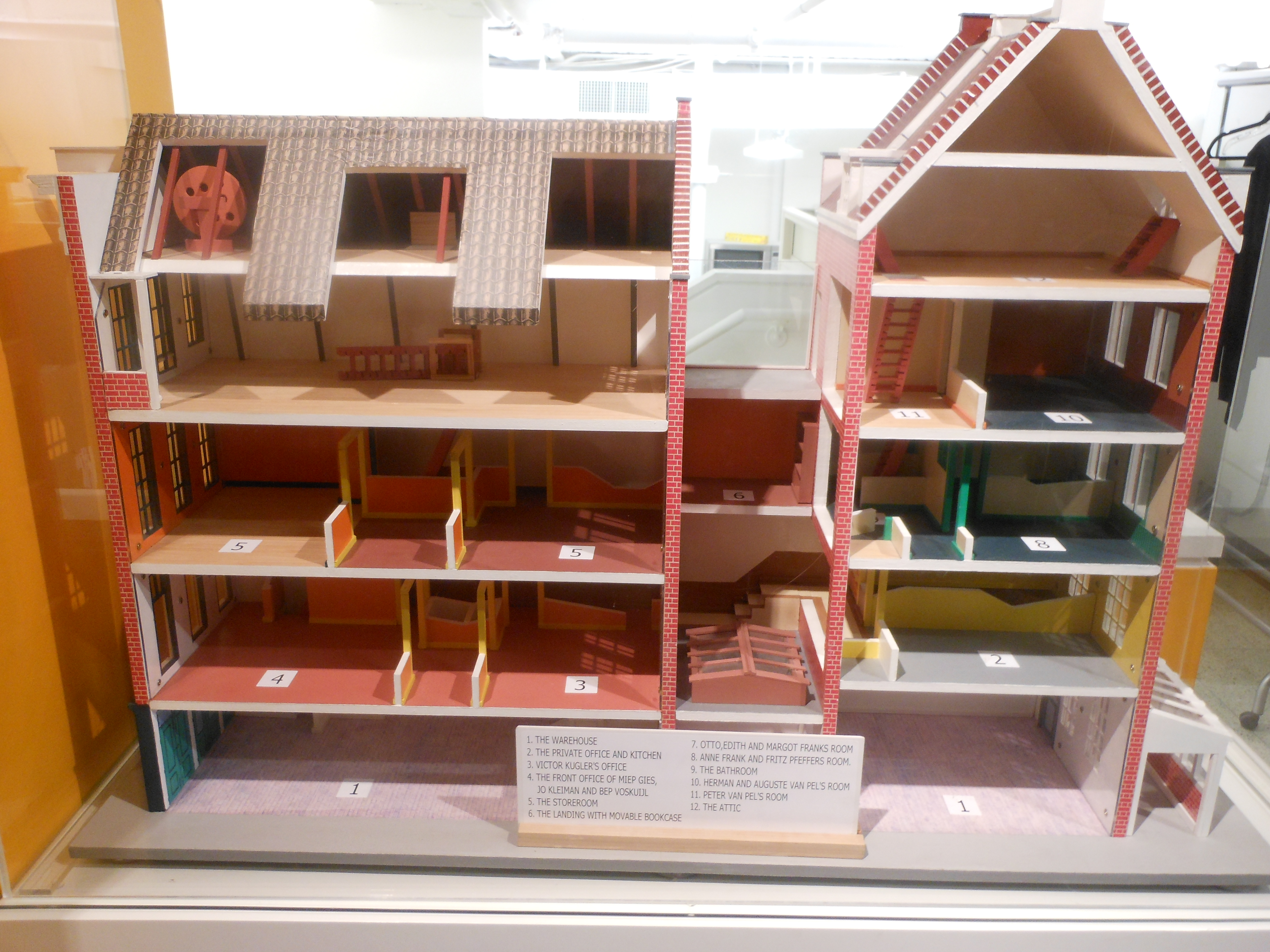
Model of the former Opekta front building (left) and rear building (right) where Anne Frank stayed

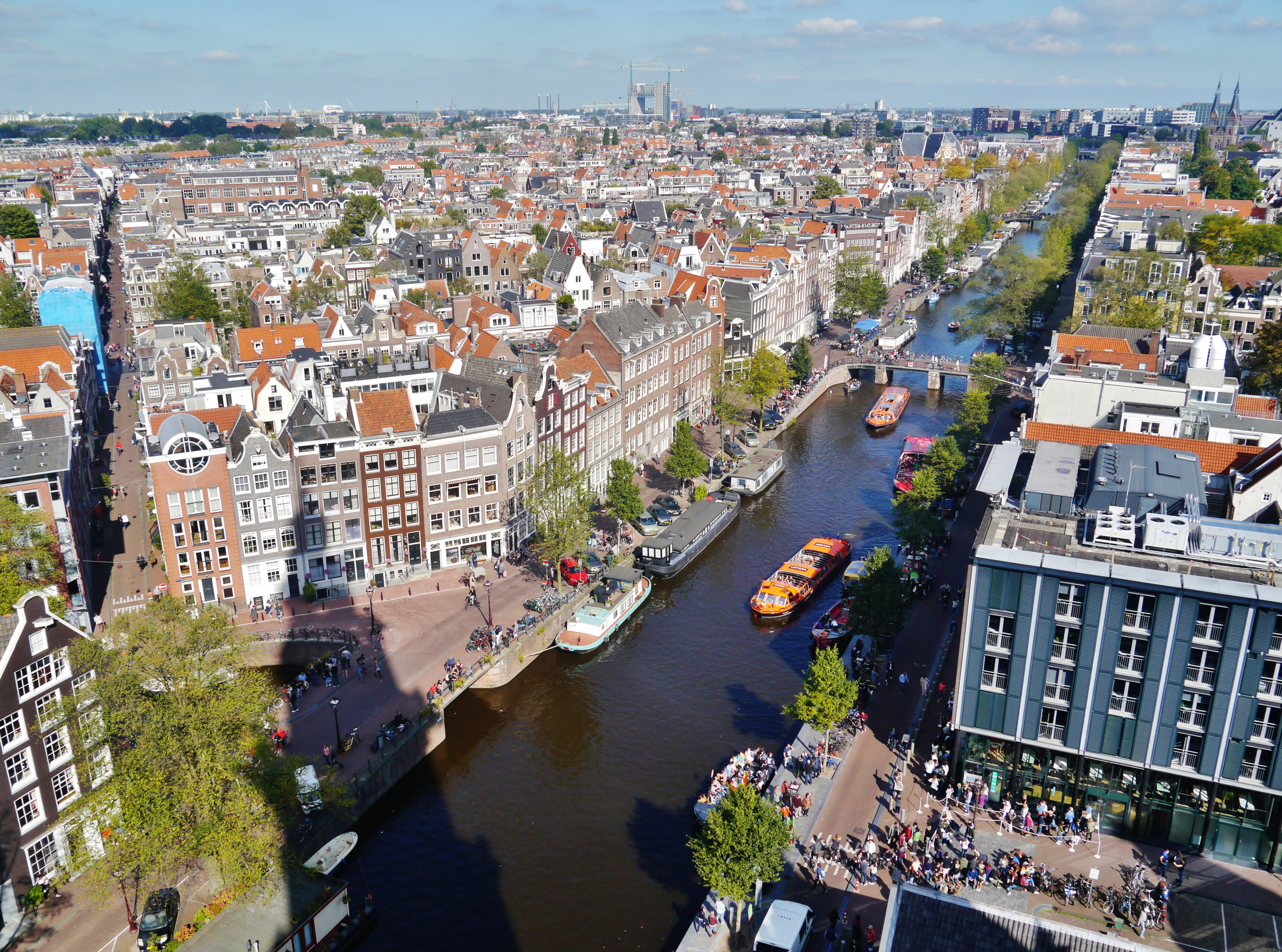
Amsterdam from the Westerkerk w/partial view of the Secret Annex (just up from the dark gray building on near-right corner, just right of block-like square gray roof of 2nd building from corner) with light-tan wall and a single small window

- The Twentieth Century
- Otto Frank at bookcase with Daniel Schorr

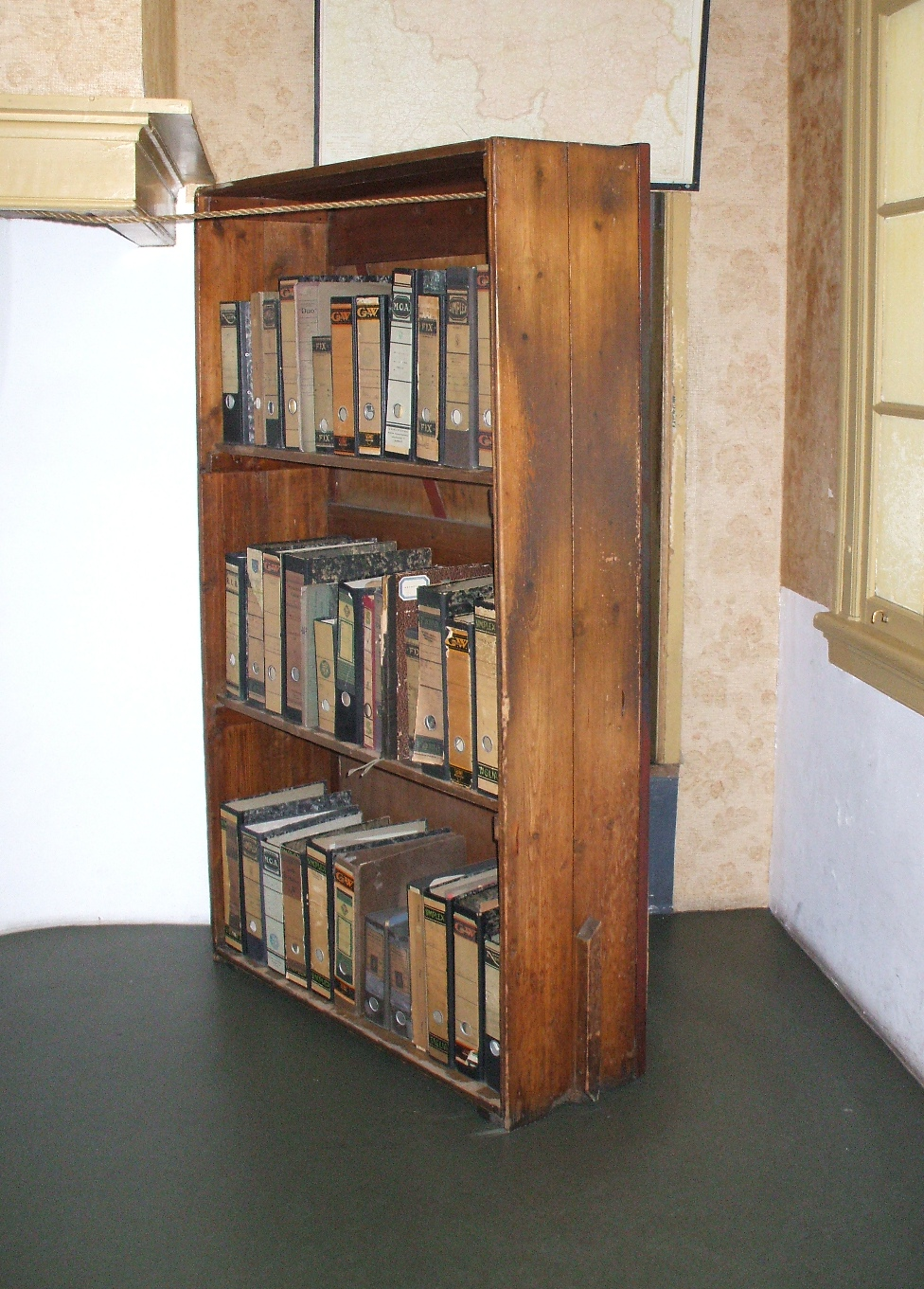
The (reconstructed) movable bookcase that covered the entrance to the annex, built by Bep Voskuijl's father Johannes Voskuijl in 1942

The house – and the one next door at number 265, which was later purchased by the museum – was built by Dirk van Delft in 1635. The canal-side façade dates from a renovation of 1740, when the rear annex was demolished. It was a private residence until the nineteenth century - in 1821, for instance, a Captain Johannes Christiaan van den Bergh, plaats-majoor der tweede klasse (adjutant third class) resided there.

Subsequently, the building became a warehouse, and the front warehouse with its wide stable-like doors was used to house horses. At the start of the 20th century, a manufacturer of household appliances occupied the building, succeeded in 1930 by a producer of piano rolls, who vacated the property by 1939.

=== World War II ===
On 1 December 1940, Anne's father, Otto Frank, moved the offices of the spice and gelling companies he worked for, Opekta and Pectacon, from an address on Singel canal to Prinsengracht 263.

The ground floor consisted of three sections; the front was the goods and dispatch entrance, behind it in the middle section were the spice mills, and at the rear, which was the ground floor of the annex, was the warehouse where the goods were packed for distribution. Directly above the ground floor were the offices of Frank's employees, with Miep Gies, Bep Voskuijl (known in the early version of The Diary of a Young Girl as Elli Vossen) and Johannes Kleiman occupying the front office while Victor Kugler worked in the middle office. The rear office held a large radio that the people in hiding used until 1943, after which the radio was handed in by the employees when the Nazis began confiscating Dutch radios.

The Achterhuis (Dutch for "back house") or Secret Annex – as it was called in The Diary of a Young Girl, an English translation of the diary – is the rear extension of the building. It was concealed from view by houses on all four sides of a quadrangle. Its secluded position made it an ideal hiding place for Otto Frank, his wife Edith, two daughters, Margot and Anne, of whom Anne was the younger, and four other Jews seeking refuge from Nazi persecution. Though the total amount of floor space in the inhabited rooms came to only about 450 square feet (42 m^{2}), Anne Frank wrote in her diary that it was relatively luxurious compared to other hiding places they had heard about. They remained hidden here for two years and one month until they were raided by the Nazi authorities, arrested, and deported to their deaths in concentration and death camps. Of the hidden group, only Otto Frank survived the camps.

After those in hiding were arrested, the hiding place was cleared by order of the arresting officers and all the remaining contents (clothes, furniture, and personal belongings) of the Frank family and their friends were seized and distributed to bombed-out families in Germany. Before the building was cleared, Miep Gies and Bep Voskuijl, who had helped hide the families, returned to the hiding place against the orders of the Dutch police and rescued some personal effects. Amongst the items they retrieved were books and papers that would eventually be compiled into The Diary of Anne Frank.

=== Publication of the diary ===
After Otto Frank returned to Amsterdam in June 1945, he was given Anne's diaries and papers and subsequently compiled the two versions of his daughter's diaries into a book published in Dutch in 1947 under the title Het Achterhuis, which Anne had chosen as the name of a future memoir or novel based on her experiences in hiding. Achterhuis is a Dutch architectural term referring to a back-house (used comparatively with voorhuis meaning front-house). However, when the English translation began production, it was realised that many English-speaking readers might not be familiar with the term and it was decided that a more evocative term (the 'Secret Annexe') would better convey the building's hidden position. Otto Frank's contributions to the diary were such that he is recognized as a co-author.

== Museum history ==
Shortly after the book was published, Otto Frank's employees showed visitors the secret rooms where the families hid. However, by 1955, the clothing manufacturing company, the Berghaus Company, bought the row of houses on Prinsengracht and had plans to demolish for and rebuild for their company's growth. Due to public pushback, the demolition was cancelled. A campaign to save the building and to list it as a protected monument was started by the Dutch paper Het Vrije Volk on November 23, 1955. The building was saved by campaigners who staged a protest outside the building on the day of demolition.

The Anne Frank Foundation was established on May 3, 1957, in leadership of Otto Frank, with the primary aim of collecting enough funds to purchase and restore the building. In October of that year, Berghaus Company donated the building to the foundation as a goodwill gesture. The collected funds were then used to purchase the neighboring 265 Prinsengracht house, shortly before the remaining buildings on the block were pulled down as planned. The restoration of 263 Prinsengracht began and the building was opened as a museum to the public in 1960.

The former hiding place of Anne Frank attracted a huge amount of interest, especially as translations and dramatizations of the diary had made her a figure known throughout the world. Over 9,000 visitors came in the museum's first open year. In a decade, there were twice as many. Over the years, the building required renovations to manage such a large number of visitors, and it closed temporarily for this reason in 1970 and 1999. To accommodate the growing number of visitors, in the late 1980s the City of Amsterdam proposed a new building be constructed on the corner of Prinsengracht and Westermarkt. This building became a part of the larger Anne Frank House complex that was in the process of implementing "The Maintenance and Future of the Anne Frank House" initiative in 1999. This project resulted in the preservation of the annex, front of 263 Prinsengracht, educational and functional purposes of 265 Prinsengracht, and the newly built corner structure that housed the entrance, cashier, cafe, and other amenities.

Throughout the 1999 restructuring process, ideas of a virtual journey of the museum were brought about. The first virtual reality tour was produced as a CD-Rom and consisted of photographs of an interpretation of the furnished house depicting the 1942–1944 years. In 2004, the www.annefrank.org website was published in six different languages to accommodate international audiences. The 2010 50th anniversary of the museum concurred with the production of a 3-D virtual reality, which was introduced at the event. For three important reasons a virtual tour was encouraged. First, for visitors who are unable to travel to Amsterdam they would have access to the exhibits virtually. Second, visitors could better prepare for their visit by visiting the virtual exhibit before attending the physical museum. Last, a virtual reality tour would address the capacity and accessibility problems the museum faced regularly. Additionally, the virtual tour would include parts of the annex that is off limits to the physical visitor.

On display at the museum is the Academy Award that Shelley Winters won, and later donated to the museum, for her performance as Petronella van Daan in the 1959 film The Diary of Anne Frank. The award now sits in a bullet-proof glass case in the museum.

In 1998, the Anne Frank Zentrum in Berlin was opened after the completion of a cooperation agreement with the Anne Frank House.

Canadian singer Justin Bieber made a highly publicized visit to the Anne Frank House in 2013, leaving a message in the guestbook, "Truly inspiring to be able to come here. Anne was a great girl. Hopefully she would have been a belieber." Bieber's message, perceived as self-serving, provoked public outrage. The museum defended Bieber, saying, "He's 19. It's a crazy life he's living, he didn't mean bad ... He was very interested in the story of Anne Frank and stayed for over an hour. We hope that his visit will inspire his fans to learn more about her life and hopefully read the diary."

== Administration ==
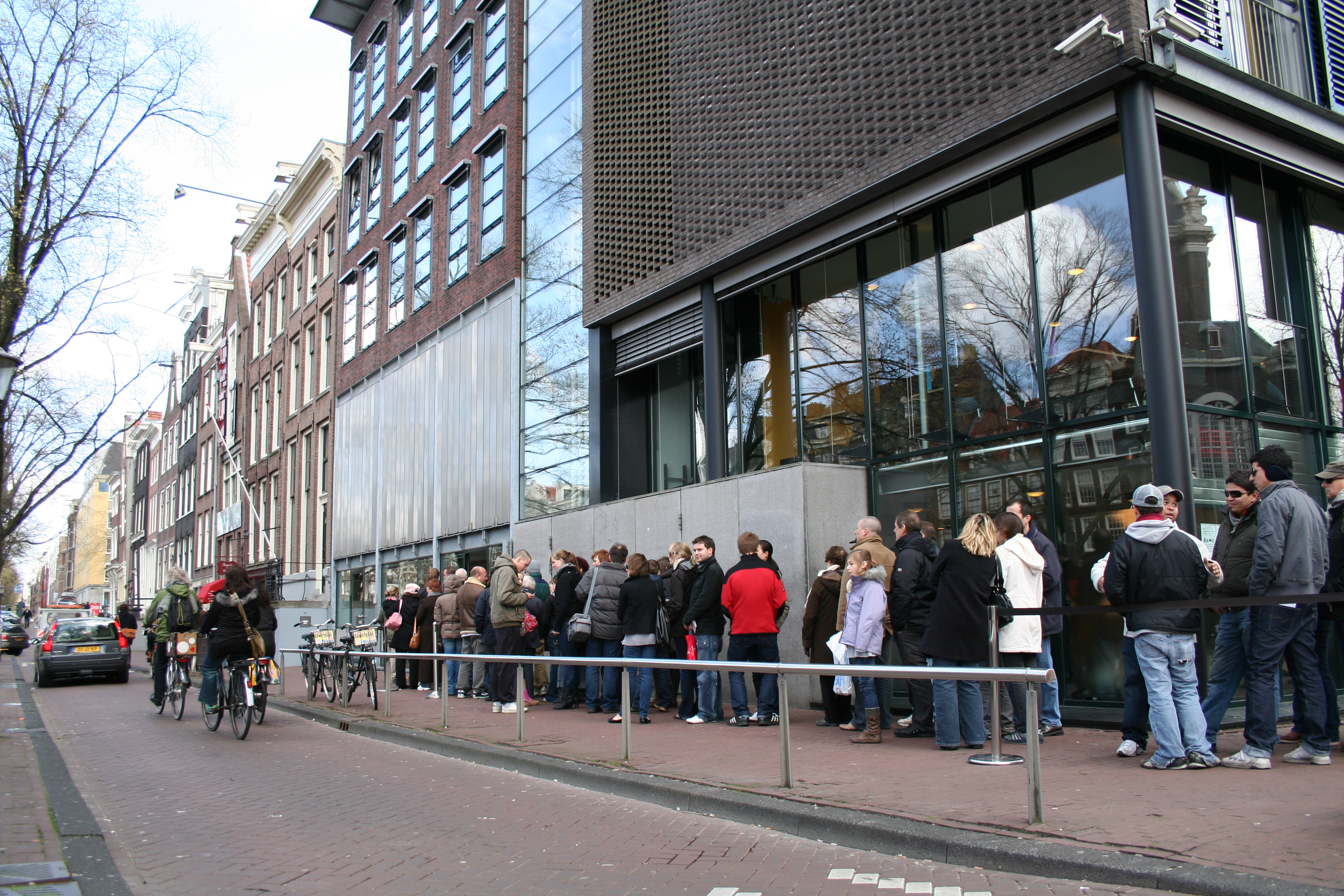
Visitors queueing in front of the museum entrance

Ronald Leopold has been executive director of the museum since 2011 and Garance Reus-Deelder has been managing director since 2012.

The museum had 1.15 million visitors in 2012, 1.20 million visitors in 2013, and 1.23 million visitors in 2014. It had 1.29 million visitors in 2016, with ongoing renovations during 2017 marginally reducing visits to 1.27 million; for 2017, it was the third most visited museum in the Netherlands, after the Van Gogh Museum and the Rijksmuseum. (Note: The linked List of most visited museums in the Netherlands article includes all tourists visiting the Zaanse Schans#Attractions for its second place ranking, counting the entire large area of historic windmills and numerous associated museums as a single entry. For unitary museum complexes, Rijksmuseum is second and Anne Frank House is third. For example, per the available 2017 figures, the Zaans Museum itself only had 142,000 visitors.)

The museum is a member of the Museumvereniging (Museum Association).

== See also ==
- Anne Frank tree
- Anne Frank Educational Centre
- Anne Frank Zentrum
