= Anne Frank Educational Centre =

Educational organisation in Frankfurt/Main

The Anne Frank Educational Centre (German: Bildungsstätte Anne Frank) is an organisation promoting education on antisemitism and racism. It was founded in 1997 and is located in the neighbourhood of Dornbusch, Frankfurt am Main in Germany where Anne Frank was born. The centre is supported by the Anne-Frank-Fonds in Basel. In their work, the Centre uses the biography and the diary of Anne Frank as a tool to promote tolerance and to educate people about the consequences of Nazism, discrimination and racism.

Since the 2010s, the centre has expanded its activities on human rights education and facilitating dialogue between people from different backgrounds, social status and lifestyle.

== History ==
As early as 1950, Anne Frank's father Otto wanted to found an educational centre in Anne's name. However, it took over 40 years for his wish to become reality. In 1994 the "Jugendbegegnungsstätte Anne Frank e.V." society was founded. On 15 June 1997 the Anne Frank Educational Centre was opened, in the former "Haus der Jugend" (Youth Club/Hostel), near to Anne's former home. In 2003 a new multimedia exhibition "Anne Frank: A Girl from Germany" was opened. The exhibition was developed and produced in cooperation with the Anne Frank House (Amsterdam) and the Anne Frank Zentrum (Berlin).

Since 2003, adults and young people have had the opportunity to explore the permanent multimedia exhibition “Anne Frank: A Girl from Germany”, guided by their own interest. Visitors have the opportunity to unravel the individual stories within the broader history of Nazism. Additionally, the centre organises seminars, training courses and projects on related topics.

Since 2010 Meron Mendel has been the director of the Anne Frank Educational Centre. Under his leadership, the centre expanded its activities with a multimedia learning laboratory for young people, two counselling units for victims of right-wing violence, as well as with temporary exhibitions, for example on The Holocaust in comics.

Unlike in its early years, the centre is not only focusing on the history of Anne Frank and The Holocaust. Its new focus is human rights education and facilitating dialogue between people from different backgrounds, social status and lifestyle. The centre offers activities for the general German society, including people with a personal history of immigration, such as Muslims in Germany. Supporting teachers and parents, the centre has published surveys and materials for educational use, for example regarding the Gaza war after 7 October 2023. Further, the local institution has greatly enlarged its staff and budget and become internationally known.

== See also ==
- International Youth Meeting Center in Oświęcim/Auschwitz. An independent youth educational center with related goals.
- International Youth Meeting Centre in Krzyżowa. A second youth meeting center in Poland that is devoted to dialogue and reconciliation between Poland and Germany. The Centre was founded after an historic 1989 meeting of Polish Prime Minister Tadeusz Mazowiecki and the German Federal Chancellor Helmut Kohl.
