= Rudolf Schaad =

- Born: 14 December 1901; Prishib, Taurida Governorate, Russian Empire
- Died: 15 February 1990 (aged 88); Stuttgart, Baden-Württemberg, West Germany
- Occupations: Film Editor, Assistant Director, Film Director
- Years active: 1932 – 1956 (film)

Rudolf Schaad (14 December 1901 – 15 February 1990) was a Russian-born German film editor. He edited the 1933 film Invisible Opponent and its French-language version The Oil Sharks.

== Selected filmography ==
- The Countess of Monte Cristo (1932)
- The Oil Sharks (1933)
- Invisible Opponent (1933)
- Heinz in the Moon (1934)
- Such a Rascal (1934)
- A Mother's Love (1939)
- Late Love (1943)
- The Time with You (1948)
- Wedding Night In Paradise (1950)
- When a Woman Loves (1950)
- Miracles Still Happen (1951)
- Diary of a Married Woman (1953)
- The Cornet (1955)

== Bibliography ==
- Youngkin, Stephen. The Lost One: A Life of Peter Lorre. University Press of Kentucky, 2005.
