= Erwin Scharf (art director) =

Austrian art director (1901–1972)

- Born: 9 February 1901; Vienna, Austro-Hungarian Empire
- Died: 8 February 1972 (aged 70); New York City, United States
- Occupation: Art director
- Years active: 1929–1950 (film)

Erwin Scharf (1901–1972) was an Austrian art director. He worked in the German film industry during the Weimar Era, often collaborating with Robert Neppach on set designs. Because of his Jewish heritage he left Germany following the Nazi takeover in 1933, and spent the next five years working in a variety of European countries. This included the 1937 Carol Reed-directed film Who's Your Lady Friend? in Britain. In 1938 he settled in the United States. His final cinematic work was on the 1950 film Kill or Be Killed.

== Selected filmography ==
- Father and Son (1929)
- Katharina Knie (1929)
- The Green Monocle (1929)
- Him or Me (1930)
- The Song Is Ended (1930)
- Weekend in Paradise (1931)
- Panic in Chicago (1931)
- The Bartered Bride (1932)
- The First Right of the Child (1932)
- The Company's in Love (1932)
- The Pride of Company Three (1932)
- Haunted People (1932)
- Invisible Opponent (1933)
- The Oil Sharks (1933)
- De Big van het Regiment (1935)
- Catherine the Last (1936)
- Who's Your Lady Friend? (1937)
- The Street Singer (1937)
- Witches' Night (1937)
- Career (1938)
- Follies Girl (1943)
- Kill or Be Killed (1950)

== Bibliography ==
- Evans, Peter William. Carol Reed. Manchester University Press, 2019.
