= The Cornet (film) =

1955 film

- Directed by: Walter Reisch
- Written by: Walter Reisch; Rainer Maria Rilke (book)
- Produced by: Emile J. Lustig; Friedrich A. Mainz
- Starring: Götz von Langheim; Anita Björk; Wolfgang Preiss
- Cinematography: Göran Strindberg
- Edited by: Rudolf Schaad
- Music by: Werner Eisbrenner
- Production company: Fama Film
- Distributed by: Allianz Film
- Release date: 16 December 1955
- Running time: 109 minutes
- Country: West Germany
- Language: German

The Cornet (German: Der Cornet. Die Weise von Liebe und Tod) is a 1955 West German historical film war film directed by Walter Reisch and starring Götz von Langheim, Anita Björk and Wolfgang Preiss.

Set during the Great Turkish War, the film is related to the 1912 poem The Love and Death of Cornet Christopher Rilke by Rainer Maria Rilke. It was shot in Eastmancolor. Location filming took place in Würzburg in Bavaria. The film's sets were designed by the art director Wolf Englert.

== Cast ==
- Götz von Langheim as Cornet Christoph von Rilke
- Anita Björk as Gräfin von Zathmar
- Wolfgang Preiss as Freiherr von Pirovano
- Peter van Eyck as Mönchschreiber
- Benno Sterzenbach as Rittmeister Reningen
- Walter Janssen as Arzt
- Claus Clausen as General Graf Spork
- Piet Clausen as Adjutant Spork
- Fritz Rasp as Großwesir
- Eduard Köck as Falkenier
- Karl Friedrich Feudell as Kurier
- Emmy Erb as Obermagd
- Hanne-Lore Morell as Edeldame
- Almut Rothweiler as Edeldame
- Ruth Fischer as Zigeunerin
- Jochen Schröder as Der Deutsche
- Hans-Joachim Post as Der Spucker
- Gisela Free as Magd
- Fritz Friedrichs as Pfarrer
- Willi Hanning as Amtmann
- Friedrich Koch as Richter
- Heinz Püschel as Türkischer Feldwebel
- Walter Clemens as Marquis
- Rolf Kutschera
- Klaus Miedel
- Wolfgang Schmidt-Kessler

== Bibliography ==
- Davidson, John & Hake, Sabine. Framing the Fifties: Cinema in a Divided Germany. Berghahn Books, 2007.
