= Crime Over London =

1936 British film by Alfred Zeisler

- Directed by: Alfred Zeisler
- Written by: Harold French; Norman Alexander
- Based on: House of a Thousand Windows by Ludwig von Wohl
- Produced by: Marcel Hellman
- Starring: Margot Grahame; Paul Cavanagh; David Burns; Basil Sydney
- Cinematography: Victor Arménise
- Edited by: Conrad von Molo
- Music by: Percival Mackey
- Production company: Criterion Film Productions
- Distributed by: United Artists
- Release date: 22 October 1936
- Running time: 84 minutes
- Country: United Kingdom
- Language: English

Crime Over London is a 1936 British crime film directed by Alfred Zeisler and starring Margot Grahame, Paul Cavanagh and David Burns. It was written by Harold French and Norman Alexander based on the novel House of a Thousand Windows by Ludwig von Wohl. It was made at Isleworth Studios, with sets designed by art director Edward Carrick. Distributed by United Artists in Britain, it was later given an American release by Gaumont British. It was also re-issued in Britain in cut form in 1946.

== Plot ==
With the police on their tail, a gang of New York criminals decided to relocate to London where they plan a major robbery on a department store.

== Main cast ==
- Margot Grahame as Pearl, gang moll
- Paul Cavanagh as Inspector Gary
- David Burns as Sniffy
- Joseph Cawthorn as Mr. Sherwood / Reilly
- Basil Sydney as 'Joker' Finnigan
- Rene Ray as Joan
- Bruce Lester as Ronald Martin
- Edmon Ryan as Spider
- John Darrow as Jim
- Danny Green as Klemm
- Googie Withers as Miss Dupres
- Roland Culver as soap salesman
- Torin Thatcher as Mr. Finley

== Reception ==
The Monthly Film Bulletin wrote: "This complicated and involved story lacks the element of surprise, and is long drawn out in its development. The characters are types rather than individuals, and no very great demands are made on the capable cast. Joseph Cawthorne is amusing in the dual role of Sherwood and Riley, and Basil Sydney is a suitably sinister villain. The direction is, on the whole, competent and workmanlike. The settings are mainly of the department store, and are as magnificent and lavish as the most exacting shopper could desire."

Kine Weekly wrote: "An attempt has been made here to plant American gangster stuff in a London setting, but it fails dismally for want of a sane, straightforward story, vital characterisation, and intelligent, showmanlike direction. In fact, so colourless is the entertainment, a cross between a quota quickie and a serial, that it would have all its work cut out to keep youngsters in their seats, let alone adults."
