= Kill or Be Killed (1950 film) =

1950 film

- Theatrical release poster
- Directed by: Max Nosseck
- Screenplay by: Arnold Lippschitz; Max Nosseck; Lawrence L. Goldman
- Produced by: Walter Jurmann
- Starring: Lawrence Tierney; George Coulouris; Marissa O'Brien; Rudolph Anders; Lopes da Silva; Veloso Pires
- Cinematography: J. Roy Hunt
- Edited by: W.L. Bagier
- Music by: Karl Hajos
- Production company: Juno Productions Inc.
- Distributed by: Eagle-Lion Films
- Release date: April 1950
- Running time: 67 minutes
- Country: United States
- Language: English

Kill or Be Killed is a 1950 American crime film directed by Max Nosseck. It was written by Arnold Lippschitz, Max Nosseck and Lawrence L. Goldman and stars Lawrence Tierney, George Coulouris and Marissa O'Brien. It was released in April by Eagle-Lion Films. The sets were designed by art director Erwin Scharf.

== Plot ==
An American engineer suspected of murder near the Amazon River uncovers a blackmail scheme and outwits deadly vipers on the path to an extramarital affair.

== Cast ==
- Lawrence Tierney as Robert Warren
- George Coulouris as Victor Sloma
- Marissa O'Brien as Maria Marek
- Rudolph Anders as Gregory Marek
- Lopes da Silva as Huerta
- Veloso Pires as Damiao
- Leonor Maia as Nina
- João Amaro as Jose
- Licinio Sena as Procopio
- Helga Liné as Dancer
- Mira Lobo as Overseer
