= Raoul Aslan =

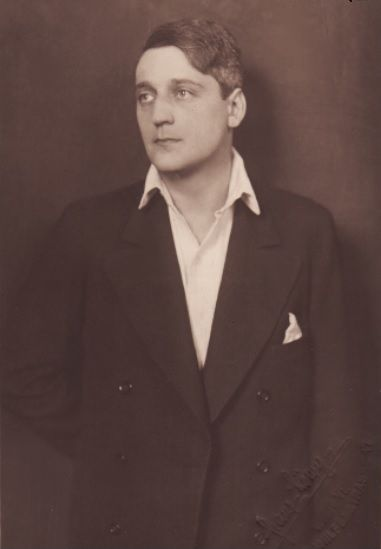
- Born: Tigran Aslanyan; 16 October 1886; Selânik, Ottoman Empire
- Died: 17 June 1958 (aged 71); Seewalchen am Attersee, Austria

Raoul Aslan (Armenian: Ռաուլ Ասլան, born Tigran Aslanyan, Armenian: Տիգրան Ասլանյան; 16 October 1886 – 17 June 1958) was an Austrian theater actor of Greek-Armenian ancestry.

== Life ==
Born in Saloniki, Ottoman Empire (now in Greece), his father was a tobacco merchant and his mother, an Italian emigree. As was customary in high-standing Ottoman families at the time, his mother tongue was French, and, in 1896, he moved to Vienna with his mother to attend high school.

There, he joined the Volkstheater in 1917, and was active at the Burgtheater from 1920 to 1958, where he mainly played classical heroes and complex characters such as Hamlet, Mephisto, Marquis Posa, and Nathan. In 1929 he was the first actor to be awarded the title "Kammerschauspieler", as he regarded as its star actor.

After the Anchluss, he was listed on Joseph Goebbels' Gottbegnadeten list as a crucial representative of National Socialist culture, and thus exempt of all military movilisation. Despite this, he was publicly known to be in opposition to the regime, as well as a homosexual, despite the high level of political prosecution both communities faced at the time.

After the war, served as director of the Burgtheater from 1945 to 1948, and continued acting until his death. From 1934 onwards, he shared an apartment with his partner Tonio Riedl. He died in Seewalchen am Attersee in 1958 and was buried at the Grinzinger cemetery in Vienna.

== Quotes ==
Aslan once said to fellow actor Gustaf Gründgens: "Mr. Gründgens, you're the greatest German actor, I am the greatest German actor. But one thing you should never forget: My family comes from Konstantinopel via Thessaloniki to Vienna. And you, Mr. Gründgens, you are from Düsseldorf."

== Selected filmography ==
- The Other I (1918)
- The Venus (1922)
- The Flute Concert of Sanssouci (1930)
- Yorck (1931)
- The White Demon (1932)
- Narcotics (1932)
- Gently My Songs Entreat (1933)
- Invisible Opponent (1933)
- The Oil Sharks (1933)
- Girls' Dormitory (1936)
- Mirror of Life (1938)
- Mozart (1955)
- Goetz von Berlichingen (1955)
