= Friedrich Heer =

Austrian historian

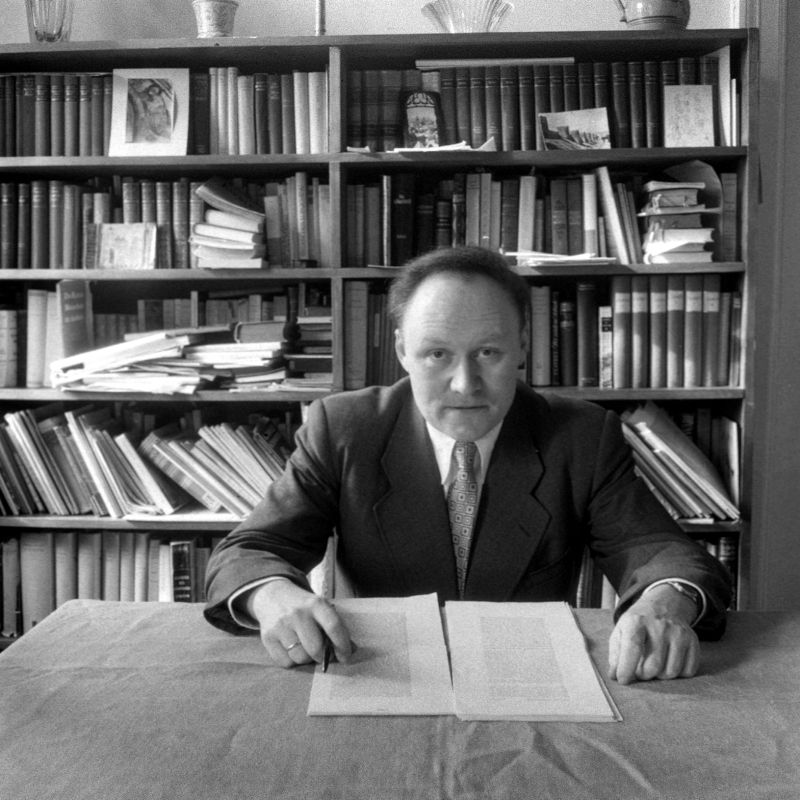
- Friedrich Heer in his apartment in Vienna, Johann-Strauß-Gasse 28.
- Born: April 10, 1916
- Died: September 18, 1983 (aged 67)
- Occupations: cultural historian, writer, journalist
- Awards: Buber-Rosenzweig-Medal
- Website: friedrichheer.com

Friedrich Heer (10 April 1916 – 18 September 1983) was an Austrian cultural historian, writer, journalist, and prominent left-wing Catholic intellectual of the postwar period. He was born and died in Vienna.

== Early life ==
From autumn 1934, he studied history, art history, and German language and literature at the University of Vienna. In 1935, Heer spent time studying in Riga, Königsberg in Prussia, and Berlin, and in 1936 he completed the preparatory course at the Institute for Austrian Historical Research. In 1938, he received a PhD in philosophy with a thesis on the intellectual history of the Middle Ages. Even as a student, he came into conflict with pan-German historians as a staunch opponent of National Socialism.

He was arrested for the first time on 11 March 1938 by the Austrian Nazis. He founded a small Catholic resistance group and sought to amalgamate into one organised band the Christians, communists and trade unionists against the Nazis. As a soldier, he later came into contact with the resistance group "Soldatenrat".

== Career ==
From 1946 to 1961, he was the editor of the weekly magazine Die Furche [The Furrow], and in 1961, he was appointed chief literacy to the Vienna Burgtheater. He taught at the University of Vienna. Most of his books have been translated into several languages.

Heer was a historian of ideas, religion, and culture. As a historian, he was less of a tireless researcher of details in archives and more concerned with providing an interpretive and explanatory, often narrative, overview of specific events, eras, or individuals. Among other things, he devoted himself to the history of the Holy Roman Empire and its relationship to Europe. In his view, Charlemagne was the "father of Europe," whose empire shaped the structures of European history. For him, the 11th and 12th centuries, the era of the Salian and Hohenstaufen dynasties, were the decisive and formative period for the new Europe. The supranational Holy Roman Empire, in conjunction with the Habsburg Empire of Charles V, where "the sun never set," was a Europe of unity in diversity on a small scale. According to Heer, the "driving force of the Western world is its Christian core."

== Later life ==
In 1967, he became the first winner of the Martin Buber-Franz Rosenzweig Medal, awarded by a group of forty-four German societies for Christian and Jewish understanding, for his achievement with God's First Love.

He died in Vienna.

== Decorations and awards ==
- 1949: City of Vienna Prize for Humanities
- 1968: Award of the German Coordinating Council of Societies for Christian-Jewish Cooperation first ever "Buber Rosenzweig Medal" (with the Protestant theologian Friedrich-Wilhelm Marquardt) (Presentation: March 17, 1968)
- 1972: Grand Austrian State Prize (Presentation: 21 December 1972)
- 1976: Medal of the capital Vienna in gold for important journalistic and academic achievements (council decision of 21 May 1976)
- 1977: Austrian Cross of Honour for Science and Art, 1st class (awarded May 4, 1977)
- 1981: Donauland Nonfiction Book Award

== Publications ==
- 1947: Die Stunde des Christen
- 1949: Gespräch der Feinde
- 1949: Aufgang Europas (2 Bände)
- 1950: Der achte Tag (Roman, erschienen unter dem Pseudonym „Hermann Gohde“)
- 1952: Die Tragödie des Heiligen Reiches
- 1953: Europäische Geistesgeschichte
- 1953: Grundlagen der europäischen Demokratie der Neuzeit
- 1960: Die dritte Kraft
- 1961: Mittelalter – von 1100 bis 1350 (The Medieval World: 1100-1350, Weidenfeld & Nicolson, 1962)
- 1964: Europa – Mutter der Revolutionen (The Intellectual History of Europe, Weidenfeld & Nicolson, 1966)
- 1967: Das Heilige Römische Reich (The Holy Roman Empire, Weidenfeld & Nicolson, 1968). Abridged translation reprinted by Phoenix Press, 1995
- 1967: Gottes erste Liebe. Die Juden im Spannungsfeld der Geschichte. ISBN 3-548-34329-5 (God's First Love: Christians and Jews Over Two Thousand Years, Weidenfeld & Nicolson, 1967). Reprinted by Phoenix Press, 1999
- 1968: Der Glaube des Adolf Hitler. Anatomie einer politischen Religiosität. ISBN 3-548-34598-0
- 1974-75: Kindlers Kulturgeschichte des Abendlandes
- 1975: Charlemagne and his World (Weidenfeld & Nicolson, 1975)
- 1978: Warum gibt es kein Geistesleben in Deutschland? ISBN 3-471-17830-6
- 1981: Der König und die Kaiserin (Gegenüberstellung Friedrich II. und Maria Theresia)
- 1981: Der Kampf um die österreichische Identität

== See also ==
- List of Austrian writers
