= Kaja Fehr =

American film editor

- Occupation: Film editor
- Parent: Rudi Fehr (father)

Kaja Fehr is an American film editor. She was nominated for an Academy Award in the category Best Film Editing for the film Prizzi's Honor.

== Selected filmography ==
- Prizzi's Honor (1985; co-nominated with Rudi Fehr)
- Tough Guys (1986)
