= Arrow to the Heart =

- Sunday Night Theatre episode
- Episode no.: Season 3 Episode 29
- Directed by: Rudolph Cartier
- Written by: Rudolph Cartier; Nigel Kneale
- Original air date: 2 July 1952

"Arrow to the Heart" is a British television drama, broadcast live twice by BBC Television in 1952, four days apart, and again in 1956. It was adapted from the 1950 German novel Unruhige Nacht by Albrecht Goes.

It was the first collaboration between director Rudolph Cartier and writer Nigel Kneale, who were both, according to television historian Lez Cooke, "responsible for introducing a completely new dimension to television drama in the early to mid-1950s."

== Plot ==
Based on an incident from Goes's own experiences during World War II, the action of the story takes place over one night on the Eastern Front in Russia in 1943. A German Army pastor has been flown in to oversee the military execution of a convicted deserter. The pastor finds himself sharing a room with an officer who is due to be sent to fight with the German Sixth Army in the Battle of Stalingrad, virtually a death sentence itself. Through studying documentation surrounding the case, the pastor comes to realise that the deserter is in fact innocent, but his execution goes ahead as scheduled in the morning. The officer, however, earns a temporary reprieve as news comes through that the Sixth Army has fallen and the battle for Stalingrad has ended in defeat.

== Production ==
Rudolph Cartier had joined the staff of the BBC drama department earlier in 1952, after previously having worked in the film industry. Arrow to the Heart was his first television production for the BBC.

The Austrian-born Cartier adapted Goes's novel into script form himself, as well as directing the production. The BBC's Head of Drama, Michael Barry, felt that Cartier's English dialogue was not quite right, and assigned Nigel Kneale – a staff writer who had been working at the BBC since the previous year – to improve it, with Cartier's approval. Officially credited for "additional dialogue", this was Kneale's first major television drama credit.

The drama starred Robert Harris, Howard Lang, Esmond Knight, Leonard White and Donald Pleasence, and was transmitted live from 9–10.40pm on the evening of Sunday 20 July 1952. It was performed live for a second time four days later, from 7.25–9.15pm on Thursday 24 July 1952.

Cartier remade the production, working from the original script, four years later. Transmitted on Sunday 22 April 1956, this version was also still transmitted live. Robert Harris reprised his starring role, with Cyril Shaps also appearing. The Times newspaper reviewed the production the day after its broadcast, and gave it a favourable assessment. "Mr. Rudolph Cartier's production, though soliciting the emotions blatantly with Wagner, caught numerous atmospheres by dramatic cutting and economic precision of detail (a terrified filing clerk in the background upsetting a loaded shelf)."

Routine telerecording was rare in 1952, and neither of the two transmissions would have benefited from the practice, which then gave poor visual results; this is partly the reason for the 'live repeat'. No recording of the 1956 production is known to survive either.

== See also ==
- Restless Night (1958)
