= The Oil Sharks =

1933 film

- Directed by: Rudolph Cartier; Henri Decoin
- Written by: Philipp Lothar Mayring; Heinrich Oberländer; Reinhart Steinbicker; Ludwig von Wohl; Henri Decoin
- Produced by: Sam Spiegel
- Starring: Arlette Marchal; Vivian Grey; Gabriel Gabrio; Peter Lorre
- Cinematography: Georg Bruckbauer; Eugen Schüfftan
- Edited by: Rudi Fehr; Rudolf Schaad
- Music by: Rudolph Schwarz
- Production companies: Pan-Film; Robert
- Release date: 14 July 1933
- Running time: 90 minutes
- Country: Germany
- Language: French

The Oil Sharks (French: Les requins du pétrole) is a 1933 German drama film directed by Rudolph Cartier and Henri Decoin and starring Arlette Marchal, Vivian Grey and Gabriel Gabrio. It is the French-language version of Invisible Opponent, made with the same crew but a largely different cast and some alterations to the story line. The sets for both films were designed by the art director Erwin Scharf.

== Cast ==
In alphabetical order

- Raoul Aslan as Delmonde
- Raymond Cordy as Hans Mertens
- Gabriel Gabrio as James Godfrey
- Jean Galland as Pierre Ugron
- Vivian Grey as Eve Ugron
- Peter Lorre as Henry Pless
- Arlette Marchal as Jeannette
- Robert Ozanne as Santos

== Bibliography ==
- Youngkin, Stephen (2005). The Lost One: A Life of Peter Lorre. University Press of Kentucky. ISBN 978-0-8131-7185-2.
