= Saba-Nur Cheema =

German political scientist and writer, born 1987

- Born: 1987 (age 38–39); Frankfurt am Main, Germany
- Citizenship: German
- Education: Johann Wolfgang Goethe-Universität Frankfurt
- Occupations: Political scientist, writer
- Years active: 2014 - present
- Spouse: Meron Mendel
- Website: sabanurcheema.com/home

Saba-Nur Cheema (* 1987) is a German political scientist and writer. Both in public statements and publications, she has commented on antisemitism, Islamophobia, Jewish-Muslim relations and societies marked by international migration. Further, she is an advisor of the German Federal Government on Islamophobia and a columnist on Muslim-Jewish relations in Germany.

== Life and career ==
Cheema is the daughter of Ahmadi Muslim Pakistani parents who came to Germany as refugees. She grew up in Frankfurt am Main and studied political science, history and economics at the Goethe University Frankfurt, where she received her diploma degree.

Cheema started as a lecturer at the Frankfurt University of Applied Sciences in the Department of Social Work. From 2015 to 2021 she was Head of the Education Department at the Anne Frank Educational Centre. There, Cheema developed projects for historical and political education to counter right-wing ideologies, discrimination and antisemitism. Since 2022, she has been a research associate at the Faculty of Educational Sciences of the Goethe University Frankfurt.

During the 2020 Corona pandemic, she and her team implemented a comprehensive program of digital formats for political education. Since 2021, she has been a research assistant in a project at the Faculty of Education at Goethe University. She has been studying how children in kindergarten and primary school respond to social distinctions with regard to physical characteristics such as skin color, cultural, religious or national differences.

In September 2020, Saba-Nur Cheema was appointed as one of several experts by the Federal Minister of the Interior to the Independent Expert Group on Islamophobia, established in response to racist and Islamophobic crimes such as the terrorist Hanau shootings. This group consisted of twelve representatives with scientific and practical experience in order to analyse Islamophobic attitudes and hostility. Along with recommendations for action by politicians, public administration and society the group's report was published by the Interior Ministry in June 2023 under the title Muslimfeindlichkeit – Eine deutsche Bilanz (Islamophobia - Findings from Germany). Following a legal ruling about infringements relating to personal information, the Federal Ministry withdrew this report in March 2024.

In public debates, Cheema has been present with publications and interviews as an expert on her fields of research and practice, on social developments and current events in Germany. She has described her work as an interpretation of the question of how people want to live together in today's societies. Further, she interprets social unease in Germany and elsewhere as a reflex to persons of color and people with a background of migration becoming more visible in society.

In articles and interviews, Cheema said that the Holocaust is not only part of German, but of human history. According to her, current antisemitic tropes that have existed all over the world and in every community are a challenge for all societies. She sees questions about Israel's right to exist, for example, as part of an antisemitic logic.

Even though Islamophobia is directed towards people, who are seen as Muslims, Cheema does not assess all kinds of criticism towards behaviour based on Islamic rules as forms of Islamophobia. Referring to discussions between critics and defenders of Islamic behaviour, she has criticized a rigid insistence of enemies versus defenders of Islam-related positions. Rather, she advocates a “multiple Islam” and prefers open controversy and debate. On 29 January 2024, Chema and Mendel spoke at the Freie Universität Berlin inaugurating the university's lecture series against antisemitism, racism, and anti-Islamic radicalism. After discussing recent German reactions to the conflict between Israel and Palestinians, both speakers called for a "shared commitment to universal empathy; an agreement to recognize both Israel’s right to exist and the Palestinians’ right to have their own state; an explicit rejection of any and all forms of terror and violence."

Cheema is married to Israeli-German educator and writer Meron Mendel. They live in Frankfurt and have two children. Since July 2021, they have been writing the op-ed column Muslimisch-jüdisches Abendbrot (Muslim-Jewish dinner) in the Frankfurter Allgemeine Zeitung. In 2024 the couple were awarded the Federal Cross of Merit by the German president.

== Selected publications ==
=== Books ===
- with Eva Berendsen and Meron Mendel (eds.), Trigger Warnung. Identitätspolitik zwischen Abschottung, Allianzen und Abwehr, Verbrecher Verlag, Berlin 2019, ISBN 978-3-95732-380-4. 2021: Schriftenreihe der Bundeszentrale für politische Bildung, vol. 10756
- with Meron Mendel and Sina Arnold (eds.): Frenemies. Antisemitismus, Rassismus und ihre Kritiker*innen. Verbrecher Verlag, Berlin 2022, ISBN 978-3-95732-538-9.
- Cheema, Saba-Nur; Mendel, Meron (2024). Muslimisch-jüdisches Abendbrot: das Miteinander in Zeiten der Polarisierung (in German). Cologne: Kiepenheuer & Witsch. ISBN 978-3-462-00742-8.

=== Articles ===
- with H. Julia Ekser. “Who Here Is a Real German?” German Muslim Youths, Othering, and Education. In: James A. Banks (ed.): Citizenship Education and Global Migration. Implications for Theory, Research, and Teaching, American Educational Research Association, Washington, DC 2017, ISBN 978-0-935302-63-9, pp. 161–184
- "Gleichzeitigkeiten: Antimuslimischer Rassismus und islamisierter Antisemitismus – Anforderungen an die Bildungsarbeit." In Meron Mendel, Astrid Messerschmidt (ed.): Fragiler Konsens. Antisemitismuskritische Bildung in der Migrationsgesellschaft, Campus Verlag, Frankfurt a. M. 2017, ISBN 978-3-593-50781-1, pp. 61–76
- „Das hat doch nichts mit dem Islam zu tun!“. Muslime im Extremismustheater" In Eva Berendsen, Katharina Rhein, Tom Uhlig (Hrsg.): Extrem unbrauchbar. Über Gleichsetzungen von links und rechts, Verbrecher Verlag, Berlin 2019, ISBN 978-3-95732-408-5, pp. 155–168.
- "Critique, and Critique of the Critique. How the BDS Debate Leads to a Dead End". www.textezurkunst.de. 2020.
- "Antisemitische Narrative in deutsch-islamistischen Milieus". bpb.de (in German). Bundeszentrale für politische Bildung. 2020-01-21.
- "(K)Eine Glaubensfrage. Religiöse Vielfalt im pädagogischen Miteinander." In Karim Fereidooni, Stefan E. Hößl (eds.): Rassismuskritische Bildungsarbeit. Reflexionen zu Theorie und Praxis, Wochenschau Verlag, Frankfurt a. M. 2021, ISBN 978-3-7344-1188-5, pp. 109–118
