= Invisible Opponent =

1933 film

- Directed by: Rudolph Cartier
- Written by: Philipp Lothar Mayring; Heinrich Oberländer; Reinhart Steinbicker; Ludwig von Wohl
- Produced by: Sam Spiegel
- Starring: Gerda Maurus; Paul Hartmann; Oskar Homolka
- Cinematography: Georg Bruckbauer; Eugen Schüfftan
- Edited by: Rudi Fehr; Rudolf Schaad
- Music by: Rudolph Schwarz
- Production companies: Sascha-Verleih; Pan-Film; Robert Müller Filmproduktion
- Distributed by: Märkische Film (Germany)
- Release date: 18 September 1933
- Running time: 87 minutes
- Countries: Austria; Germany
- Language: German

Invisible Opponent (German: Unsichtbare Gegner) is a 1933 German-Austrian drama film directed by Rudolph Cartier and starring Gerda Maurus, Paul Hartmann, and Oskar Homolka. The film's sets were designed by the art director Erwin Scharf. The film was made at the Sievering Studios in Vienna. The critics were not generally impressed with the film, with the Deutsche Allgemeine Zeitung describing it as an "unbelievable and unbelievably awful picture".

A separate French-language version The Oil Sharks was also released.

== Synopsis ==
The plot revolves around an oil swindle in a South American country.

== Cast ==
- Gerda Maurus as Sybil Herford
- Paul Hartmann as Peter Ugron
- Oskar Homolka as James Godfrey
- Peter Lorre as Henry Pless
- Paul Kemp as Hans Mertens
- Raoul Aslan as J. Delmonte
- Leonard Steckel as Santos
- H. Kyser as Sir Thomas
- Eva Schmid-Kayser as Eva Ugron
- Jaro Fürth
- John Mylong
- Otto Schmöle
- Franke
- Maria Holst
- Josef Rehberger
- Wilhelm Stauffen
- Mihail Xantho

== Bibliography ==
- Youngkin, Stephen. The Lost One: A Life of Peter Lorre. University Press of Kentucky, 2005.
