= Anne Frank Zentrum =

Museum in Germany

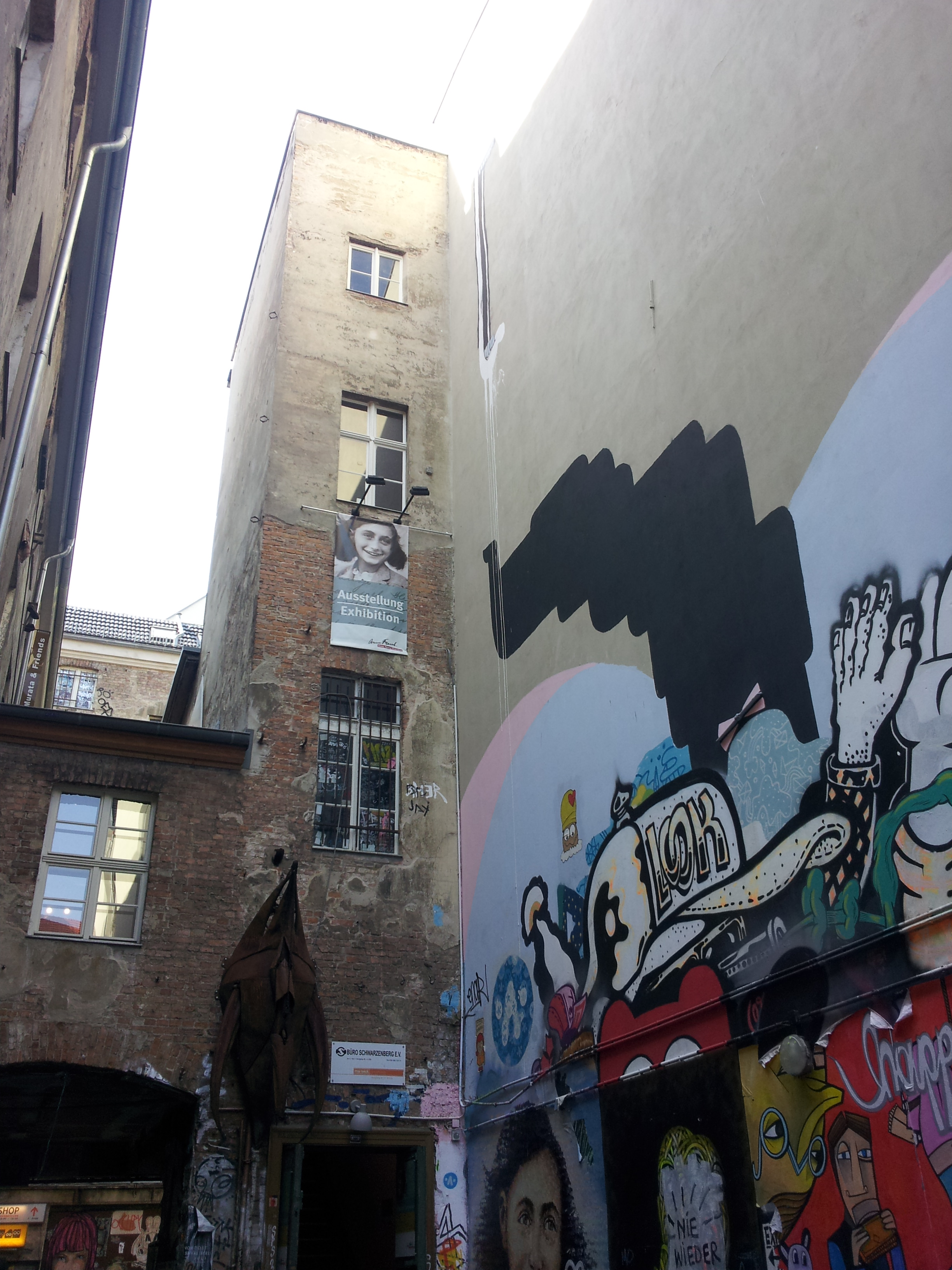
The Anne Frank Centre at Hackesche Höfe, Berlin

Anne Frank Zentrum, Berlin

The Anne Frank Zentrum (Anne Frank Centre), located in Berlin, is a history museum dedicated to Anne Frank and her diary. It contains exhibitions and an array of educational programs. The centre is committed to working against anti-Semitism, prejudice, and any kind of discrimination against people.

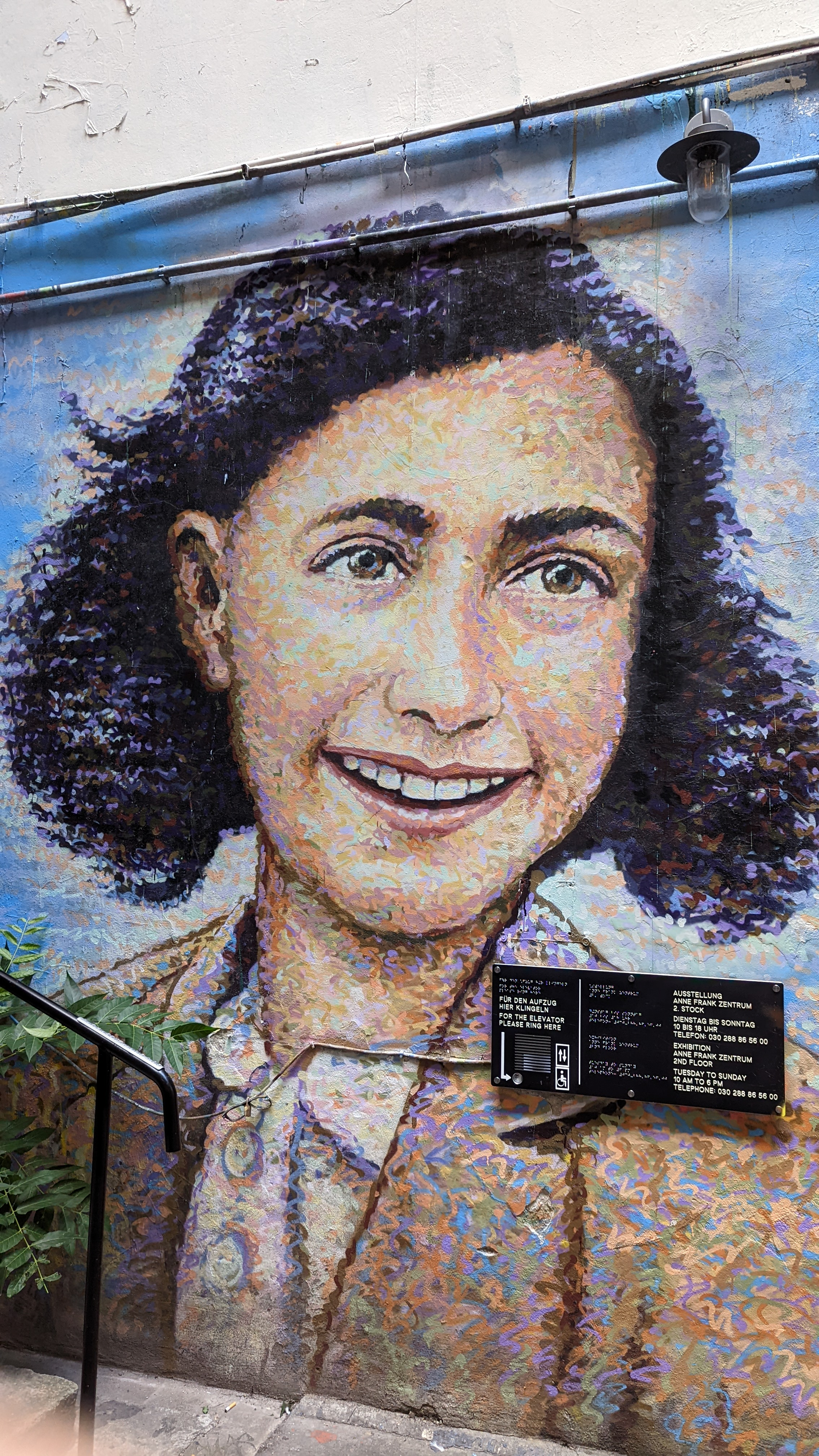
A mural of Anne Frank at the front entrance of the Anne Frank Zentrum.

== History ==
The Anne Frank Zentrum in Berlin was founded in 1994 as a response to the international travelling exhibition "The world of Anne Frank. 1929-1945". This exhibition was shown in six boroughs of the city and marked the 50th anniversary of the liberation from Nazism. To support the coordination of the exhibition and the extensive accompanying programme a Society of Friends was founded.

From this organisation, the Anne Frank Zentrum in Berlin was founded, supported by the existing Anne Frank Centres in Great Britain, acting as guides.

Through a cooperation agreement with the Anne Frank House in Amsterdam, the Anne Frank Zentrum was opened on 12 June 1998. Since September 2002, the Anne Frank Zentrum has been based next to the Hackesche Höfe at 39 Rosenthaler Strasse in Berlin.

== Exhibition in Berlin ==
On 4 November 2006 a new permanent exhibition "Anne Frank. Here & Now" opened, telling the personal life story of Anne Frank and how her tale connects to the world she lived in. The exhibition incorporates modern reflections from Berlin's young people.

== Touring exhibitions ==
Anne Frank Zentrum also invests in touring exhibitions to encourage the examination of history but also of topics such as democracy and human rights on a more national and global level. The centre takes an active role against right wing extremism in Germany.
