= Meron Mendel =

Israeli-German educator and writer, born 1976

- מירון מנדל
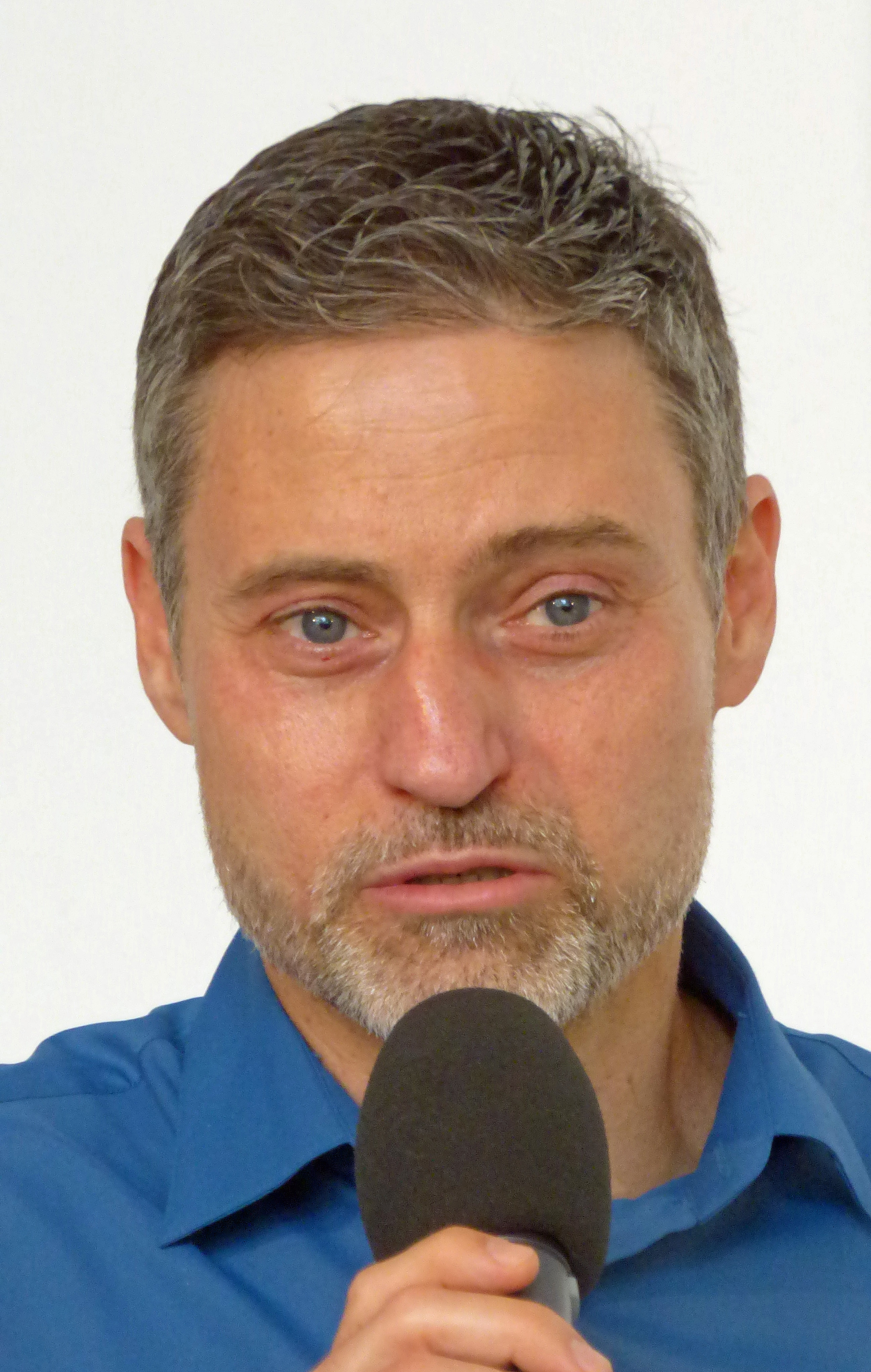
- Mendel in 2024
- Born: 1976 (age 49–50); Ramat Gan, Israel
- Citizenship: Israel, Germany
- Education: M.A. University of Haifa, 2002, PhD Johann Wolfgang Goethe-Universität Frankfurt, 2010
- Occupations: Social scientist, educator, writer
- Years active: 2010 - present
- Employer(s): Anne Frank Educational Centre, Frankfurt; Frankfurt University of Applied Sciences, Frankfurt
- Known for: Scholarship on German-Israeli relations, antisemitism and racism
- Notable work: Über Israel reden. Eine deutsche Debatte. (Talking about Israel. A German debate.)
- Spouse: Saba-Nur Cheema
- Website: meronmendel.de

Meron Mendel (Hebrew: מירון מנדל; born 1976) is an Israeli-German social scientist, professor, educator, writer and director of the Anne Frank Education Centre in Frankfurt/Main. He became known for his public statements in German news media as an expert on German-Israel relations and for his work in educational projects to combat racism and antisemitism.

== Life and career ==
Under his leadership, the centre expanded its activities with a multimedia learning laboratory for young people, two counselling units for victims of right-wing violence, as well as exhibitions, for example on The Holocaust in comics. Further, the local institution has become an internationally active organization.

Since August 2021, Mendel has been professor for transnational social work at the Frankfurt University of Applied Sciences.

Mendel's book publications deal with human rights, international migration and social integration, the culture of remembrance, racism and antisemitism, as well as identity politics and political education. He has also written on these topics for German news media, including Der Spiegel, Süddeutsche Zeitung and Die Zeit. In 2020 and 2021 he wrote a regular column in Die tageszeitung.

Mendel is married to German political scientist and writer Saba-Nur Cheema. They live in Frankfurt and have two children. Since July 2021, they have been writing the op-ed column Muslimisch-jüdisches Abendbrot (Muslim-Jewish dinner) in the Frankfurter Allgemeine Zeitung.

=== Positions in public discussions ===
Mendel repeatedly has participated in controversial public discussions. In 2017 he was involved in protest actions against the presence of right-wing publishing houses at the Frankfurt Book Fair. Especially with regard to antisemitism among young people, his criticism and demands for more efficient education have attracted attention. Commenting on a music award for two German rap musicians, Mendel said "When idols such as Kollegah and Farid Bang rap antisemitic lyrics, it naturally has a special strength and impact on young people." In 2019, Mendel described the decision of the city of Frankfurt not to provide urban venues to the BDS movement as a "strong signal against hatred of Jews and Israel-related antisemitism." Criticizing antisemitism in German cultural life, Mendel denounced a mural depicting negative caricatures of Jewish characters and symbols by an artists' collective from Indonesia at the 2022 art fair documenta fifteen.

In his article for the Süddeutsche Zeitung of 3 April 2024, Mendel commented on public discussions about cultural events in Germany, where cultural organizations had decided to cancel events including either Israeli or Palestinian writers. He denounced boycotts such as the cancellation of a literary prize for Adania Shibli at the Frankfurt Book Fair 2023 as wrong and unacceptable. According to his article, both pro-Palestinian activists protesting against cultural events including Jewish artists as well as authorities trying to silence Palestinian artists are a "threat to the freedom of cultural expression" in Germany.

== Reception ==
In March 2023 Mendel published his book Über Israel reden. Eine deutsche Debatte. (Talking about Israel. A German debate.) It was met with positive critical acclaim in newspaper and online reviews. In a review by the NDR public broadcast his views in the "excited permanent discussion" on the Middle East conflict were judged as "pleasantly differentiated." In 2023, the book was nominated for the German Non-Fiction Prize.

In 2024 Mendel and Cheema were awarded the Federal Cross of Merit by the German president.

== Selected publications ==
- with Bude, Heinz (eds.). Kunst im Streit: Antisemitismus und postkoloniale Debatte auf der documenta fifteen. Campus, Frankfurt 2025, ISBN 978-3-593-51973-9.
- with Saba-Nur Cheema: Muslimisch-jüdisches Abendbrot. Das Miteinander in Zeiten der Polarisierung. Kiepenheuer & Witsch, Cologne 2024, ISBN 978-3-462-00742-8
- as editor: Singularität im Plural. Kolonialismus, Holocaust und der zweite Historikerstreit, Beltz Juventa, Weinheim 2023, ISBN 978-3-7799-7329-4.
- Über Israel reden: Eine deutsche Debatte. Kiepenheuer & Witsch, Cologne 2023, ISBN 978-3-462-00351-2
- with Saba-Nur Cheema, Sina Arnold (eds.): Frenemies. Antisemitismus, Rassismus und ihre Kritiker*innen. Verbrecher Verlag, Berlin 2022, ISBN 978-3-95732-538-9.
- with Eva Berendsen, Saba-Nur Cheema (eds.): Trigger-Warnung: Identitätspolitik zwischen Abwehr, Abschottung und Allianzen. Verbrecher Verlag, Berlin 2019, ISBN 978-3-95732-380-4.
- Mendel, Meron, ed. (2019). Remember. Art competition of the Anne Frank Educational Centre - the first five years (in German and English). Heidelberg, Berlin: Kehrer Verlag. ISBN 978-3-86828-931-2.
- with Astrid Messerschmidt (eds.): Fragiler Konsens. Antisemitismuskritische Bildung in der Migrationsgesellschaft. Campus Verlag, Frankfurt am Main 2017, ISBN 978-3-593-50781-1.
- with Katharina Kunter, Oliver Fassing (eds.): 100 Jahre Leugnung. Der Völkermord an den ArmenierInnen – Beitrag zu einer multiperspektivischen Erinnerungskultur in Deutschland. Aschendorff Verlag, 2017, ISBN 978-3-402-13188-6.
- with Friedman-Sokuler (ed.): Menschenrechte in Erziehung. Ansätze und Arbeitsinstrumente. Bildungsstätte Anne Frank, 2016.
- with Susanne Heyn (eds.): Deutscher Kolonialismus – Ein vergessenes Erbe? Postkolonialität in der rassismuskritischen Bildungsarbeit. Bildungsstätte Anne Frank, 2015.
- Zur Identität jüdischer Jugendlicher in der gegenwärtigen Bundesrepublik Deutschland. PhD thesis, Johann Wolfgang Goethe-Universität Frankfurt a. M., BoD, Norderstedt 2010, ISBN 978-3-9813388-1-2.
