= Albrecht Goes =

German writer and Protestant theologian

Albrecht Goes (22 March 1908 – 23 February 2000) was a German writer and Protestant theologian.

== Life ==
Albrecht Goes was born in 1908 in the Protestant rectory in Langenbeutingen. He spent his childhood there, but his mother died in 1911 and in 1915 he went to live with his grandmother in Berlin-Steglitz. He went to school there until 1919, when he moved to a school in Göppingen. In 1922, he entered the theological seminary in Urach, and from 1922 to 1923 he attended the seminary in Schöntal. His room-mate there was Gerd Gaiser. He passed his university exams and in 1924 entered the advanced seminary in Urach.

In 1926, he read German studies and history in Tübingen, then switched to theology. In 1928, he went to Berlin to continue his theology studies, and there he met and was influenced by Romano Guardini. In 1930 Goes was ordained for the Evangelical Church in Württemberg as a parson in Tuttlingen's main church, and in 1931 became a vicar at the Martinskirche in Stuttgart. In 1933, he began his first rectorate in Unterbalzheim in Illertissen. In the same year he married Elisabeth Schneider, with whom he had three daughters: Christin, Brigitte and Rose. In 1938, he took up a rectorate in Gebersheim (which today is a part of the city of Leonberg).

His involvement with the German army during the Second World War began when he was conscripted in 1940. He was trained as a radio operator and sent to Romania. From 1942 to 1945 he was a clergyman in hospitals and prisons in Russia, Poland, Hungary and Austria. At the same time, his wife was sheltering several Jews from the military. After the war he returned to his ministry in Gebersheim, and he stayed there until he quit the Church in 1953 to become a full-time writer; from then on he preached twice a month. In 1954, he moved back to Stuttgart-Rohr. He campaigned against the rearmament of Germany by, for example, adding his signature to the 'German Manifesto' of the Paul's Church Movement (along with, among others, Gustav Heinemann). In 1958, he was inaugurated into the Berlin Academy of Arts.

Goes's first volumes of poetry were Verse in 1932 and Der Hirte (The Herdsman) in 1934. The story Unruhige Nacht (Restless Night) was published in 1950. The novel Das Brandopfer (The Burnt Offering) examined the Holocaust during the Third Reich from the perspective of an ordinary butcher's wife, who eventually tries to find justice by sacrificing herself. The book, written in simple language, is considered a significant contribution to the dialogue and reconciliation between Jews and Christians in the post-Third Reich era. This was recognised in 1978 when Goes was awarded the Buber-Rosenzweig Medal. Both Unruhige Nacht and Das Brandopfer were turned into films. Unruhige Nacht was translated into English as Arrow to the Heart and adapted for broadcast by BBC Television in the United Kingdom in 1952.

Goes's work is often compared with that of Albrecht Haushofer, Reinhold Schneider, Rudolf Alexander Schröder and Gertrud von Le Fort. His 100th birthday was celebrated with new scholarly books and editions of his works, and an extensive programme of events.

Goes was buried at the Prag Cemetery in Stuttgart on 28 February 2000.

== Works ==
- Verse; Stuttgart 1932
- Der Hirte. Gedichte; Leipzig 1934
- Heimat ist gut. Zehn Gedichte; Hamburg, 1935
- Lob des Lebens. Betrachtungen und Gedichte; Stuttgart, 1936
- Vergebung; 1937
- Der Zaungast; 1938
- Der Nachbar. Gedichte; Berlin, 1940
- Gelöbnis; Nachtwache, Fleckfieberlazarett, Frühling, 1943
- Die guten Gefährten. Begegnungen; 1942
- Die Begegnung. Zehn Gedichte; (Privatdruck), 1944
- Der Weg zum Stall; 1946
- Die Herberge. Gedichte; Berlin, 1947
- Unruhige Nacht; 1950
- Das Brandopfer. Erzählung, 1954
- Der Gastfreund. Prosa und Verse; Berlin (Ost), 1958
- Das Sankt Galler Spiel von der Kindheit Jesu, erneuert; 1959
- Zehn Gedichte; Frankfurt a.M., 1961
- Die Gabe und der Auftrag; Berlin (Ost), 1962
- Aber im Winde das Wort. Prosa und Verse aus zwanzig Jahren; Frankfurt a.M., 1963
- Das Löffelchen; 1965
- Tagwerk. Prosa und Verse; Frankfurt a.M., 1976
- Lichtschatten du. Gedichte aus fünfzig Jahren; Frankfurt a.M., 1978
- Erzählungen, Gedichte, Betrachtungen; Frankfurt a.M., 1986
- Keine Stunde schwindet. Eine Auswahl; Berlin (Ost), 1988
- Mit Mörike und Mozart. Studien aus fünfzig Jahren; 1991
- Dunkle Tür, angelehnt. Gedanken an der Grenze des Lebens; 1997
- Das Erstaunen. Begegnung mit dem Wunderbaren; 1998
- Lebensspur. Gedichte von Albrecht Goes und Aquarelle von Andreas Felger; Präsenz Kunst & Buch, 2007

== Honours ==
- 1958: Willibald Tirkheimer-Medaille for services to culture and literature
- 1959: Federal Cross of Merit awarded by Theodor Heuss
- 1962: Heinrich-Stahl-Preis from the Jewish community of Berlin
- 1972: Guest of Honour at the Villa Massimo in Rome
- 1974: Honorary degree from the Evangelisch Theologische Universität Mainz
- 1977: Order of Merit of Baden-Württemberg
- 1978: Buber-Rosenzweig-Medal (for the novel Das Brandopfer)
- 1979: Professorship awarded by Lothar Späth, the minister-president of Baden-Württemberg
- 1981: Albrecht-Goes-Straße was named after him in Langenbeutingen
- 1983: Citizen's Medal for special services to the city of Stuttgart
- 1991: Otto-Hirsch Medal from the city of Stuttgart
- 1994: Literature Prize from the city of Stuttgart
- 1998: Honours from the cities of Stuttgart and Leonberg, the Protestant Academy of Bad Boll, and the monastery in Schöntal to mark his 90th birthday
- 2000: Albrecht-Goes-Platz was named after him in Stuttgart, and there were celebrations of his life and work in Marbach and Leonberg
- 2001: A memorial stone was placed in front of the house in which he was born in Langenbeutingen, inscribed with lines from his poem Die Schritte (The Steps)
- 2004: Albrecht-Goes-Stube (The Albrecht Goes Room), a small museum, was opened in Langenbeutingen
- Bas-relief of Goes by Hermann Koziol is unveiled in the Place of Remembrance for the Fallen at Bretzfeld cemetery
- 2008: A series of events take place at around twenty locations in Baden-Württemberg and Leipzig to mark Goes's one hundredth birthday
- 2008: Commemorative plaque unveiled in the Protestant diocese of Tübingen
