= Crooks in Tails (1927 film) =

1927 German silent film directed by Manfred Noa

- Directed by: Manfred Noa
- Written by: Joseph Than; Ludwig von Wohl
- Produced by: Manfred Noa
- Starring: Nils Asther; Suzy Vernon; Paul Heidemann
- Cinematography: Ewald Daub
- Production company: Noa-Film
- Distributed by: Süd-Film
- Release date: 4 February 1927
- Country: Germany
- Languages: Silent; German intertitles

Crooks in Tails (German: Gauner im Frack) is a 1927 German silent film directed by Manfred Noa and starring Nils Asther, Suzy Vernon and Paul Heidemann. A sound film with the same title was released in 1937. The film's art direction was by Gustav A. Knauer.

== Cast ==
- Nils Asther as George Valeska
- Suzy Vernon as Susi Holt
- Paul Heidemann as Jean Lampion
- Asta Gundt as Maud Compson
- Oreste Bilancia as Mauds Manager
- Anton Pointner as Graf Lennoy
- Georg H. Schnell as Lennoys Sekretär
- Mary Kid

== Bibliography ==
- Quinlan, David. The Film Lover's Companion: An A to Z Guide to 2,000 Stars and the Movies They Made. Carol Publishing Group, 1997.
