= Rudolph Cartier =

Austrian television director (1904–1994)

- Cartier in 1990, speaking about his career to BBC Two's The Late Show.
- Born: Rudolph Kascer; 17 April 1904; Vienna, Austria-Hungary
- Died: 7 June 1994 (aged 90); London, England
- Education: Vienna Academy of Music and Dramatic Art
- Occupations: Television director, film director, screenwriter, producer

Rudolph Cartier (born Rudolph Kacser; 17 April 1904 – 7 June 1994), credited as Rudolph Katscher prior to 1936, was an Austrian television and film director, screenwriter, and producer. He worked predominantly in British television, exclusively for the BBC, and was best known for his 1950s collaborations with screenwriter Nigel Kneale, most notably the Quatermass serials and their 1954 adaptation of George Orwell's dystopian novel Nineteen Eighty-Four.

After studying architecture and then drama, Cartier began his career as a screenwriter and then film director in Berlin, working for UFA Studios. After a brief spell in the United States he moved to the United Kingdom in 1935. Initially failing to gain a foothold in the British film industry, he did some scripting work for BBC Television in 1939 before the service was suspended at the outbreak of the Second World War. After the war, he occasionally worked for British films before he was again hired by the BBC in 1952. He soon became one of the public service broadcaster's leading directors and went on to produce and direct more than 120 productions in the next 24 years, ending his television career with the play Loyalties in 1976.

Active in both dramatic programming and opera, Cartier won the equivalent of a BAFTA in 1957 for his work in the former, and one of his operatic productions was given an award at the 1962 Salzburg Festival. The British Film Institute's "Screenonline" website describes him as "a true pioneer of television", while the critic Peter Black once wrote that: "Nobody was within a mile of Rudolph Cartier in the trick of making a picture on a TV screen seem as wide and as deep as CinemaScope."

== Early life and career ==
Born in Vienna, Austria-Hungary (now Austria), Cartier initially studied to become an architect, before changing career paths and enrolling to study drama at the Vienna Academy of Music and Dramatic Art. There, he was taught by Max Reinhardt, who proved a major influence on Cartier. Reinhardt thought of a script as being similar to a musical score, which should be interpreted by a director in the same way as a musician interpreting a piece of music—an approach with which Cartier agreed.

Cartier became involved in the film industry in 1929, when he successfully submitted a script to a company based in Berlin, Germany. He then became a staff scriptwriter for UFA Studios, the primary German film company of the era, for which he worked on crime films and thrillers. While at UFA, he worked with noted writers, directors and producers including Ewald André Dupont and Erich Pommer. In 1933 he became a film director, overseeing the thriller Invisible Opponent for producer Sam Spiegel.

The same year as Invisible Opponent was released, the Nazis came to power in Germany, and the Jewish Cartier left the country. Several members of Cartier's family who had remained in Europe, including his mother, were murdered in the Holocaust. Encouraged by a UFA colleague, Billy Wilder, to come to Hollywood, Cartier changed his surname and moved to the United States. However, unlike Wilder, Cartier did not find success in America, and in 1935 he moved again, to the United Kingdom.

In 1939, Cartier first worked for BBC Television when his script Rehearsal for a Drama was produced by the service. He had also worked on another play for the service, The Dead Eye, but due to the outbreak of the Second World War this was stopped at the production stage. Little further is recorded of Cartier's career until after the war, when he began writing storylines for several minor British films. He also worked as a film producer, overseeing a 1951 short film adaptation of the Sherlock Holmes story The Man with the Twisted Lip. Cartier returned for a time to the United States, where he studied production methods in the new medium of television.

In 1952, Michael Barry, with whom Cartier had worked on an aborted project in 1948, became the new Head of Drama at BBC Television and interviewed Cartier for a post as a staff television producer in the drama department, a job which also involved directing. At his interview, Cartier told Barry that he thought his department's output was "dreadful", and that television drama needed "new scripts and a new approach". In a 1990 interview about his career, he told BBC Two's The Late Show that the BBC drama department had "needed me like water in the desert". Barry shared many of Cartier's views on the need to improve television drama, and he hired him for the producer's job.

== BBC television ==
Cartier's first BBC television production was a play entitled Arrow to the Heart, transmitted on the evening of 20 July 1952. It was initially adapted by Cartier from Albrecht Goes' novel Unruhige Nacht, but Barry felt that the dialogue was "too Germanic" and assigned drama department staff scriptwriter Nigel Kneale to edit the script. Arrow to the Heart was the first of many collaborations between the pair, who enjoyed during the next few years a highly productive working relationship, despite profound creative disagreements on occasion. Cartier and Kneale were an important presence in the British television drama of the era and were, according to television historian Lez Cooke, "responsible for introducing a completely new dimension to television drama in the early to mid-1950s".

=== Collaborations with Nigel Kneale ===
A Cartier location shot from Quatermass II (1955), looking down from one of the towers of the Shell Haven oil refinery. Such ambitious location work was new to British television.

Cartier and Kneale's first major production was the six-part serial The Quatermass Experiment, broadcast in the summer of 1953. A science-fiction story, it relates the sending of the first humans into space by Professor Bernard Quatermass and the consequences when an alien presence invades the crew's rocket during its flight and returns to Earth in the body of the one remaining crewmember, having absorbed the consciousnesses and shredded the bodies of the other two. A critical and popular success, The Quatermass Experiment has been described by the British Film Institute's Screenonline website as "one of the most influential series of the 1950s". Cartier's contribution to the serial's success was highlighted in his 1994 obituary in The Times newspaper, which also called the serial "a landmark in British television drama as much for its visual imagination as for its ability to shock and disturb".

The success of The Quatermass Experiment led to two sequels, Quatermass II (1955) and Quatermass and the Pit (1958–59), both produced and directed by Cartier and written by Kneale. Both were successful and critically acclaimed, and Cartier's production work on them became increasingly ambitious. For Quatermass II, he pre-filmed a significant amount of material on location, using 35 mm film, opening the drama out from a confined studio setting with the most ambitious location shooting yet attempted in British television. Cartier, with his previous experience as a film director, particularly enjoyed working on these cinema-style filmed scenes.

The appeal of the Quatermass serials has been attributed by the Museum of Broadcast Communications to the depiction of "A new range of gendered fears about Britain's postwar and post-colonial security. As a result, or perhaps simply because of Kneale and Cartier's effective combination of science fiction and poignant melodrama, audiences were captivated." The Screenonline website suggests that the visual impact of Cartier's interpretation of Kneale's scripts was a major factor in their success, which it attributes to their "originality, mass appeal and dynamism... The Quatermass Experiment became a landmark of science fiction and the cornerstone of the genre on British television."

Aside from the Quatermass serials, Cartier and Kneale collaborated on several one-off dramas, including literary and theatrical adaptations of Wuthering Heights (6 December 1953) and The Moment of Truth (10 March 1955), as well as Kneale's own The Creature (30 January 1955). Of particular note was their collaboration on an adaptation of George Orwell's novel Nineteen Eighty-Four, originally broadcast on 12 December 1954, regarded as Cartier's most famous work. The Times's review the day after its broadcast noted its "vividness... the two minutes' hate was, for instance, a wonderfully riotious orgy of vindictiveness." The production also attracted considerable controversy. There were questions asked in the House of Commons concerning some of the graphic scenes of horror in the play, and the BBC received several telephone calls threatening Cartier's life if the second live performance, scheduled for 16 December, went ahead. The BBC took these threats seriously enough to assign him bodyguards. Cartier appeared live on television himself to defend the production in a studio debate, and eventually the Board of Governors of the BBC voted that the second performance should go ahead as planned. The production had by this time received the backing of the Duke of Edinburgh, who commented during a speech to the Royal Society of Arts that he and the Queen had watched and enjoyed the first performance.

Nineteen Eighty-Four had been a success, but it was also one of the most expensive television dramas ever made in the UK. Cartier often spent large amounts of money on his productions. Earlier in 1954, Michael Barry had heavily criticised him for the money and resources he had expended in an adaptation of Daphne du Maurier's 1938 novel Rebecca. In a memo written after that production's transmission, Barry admonished Cartier for his over-ambitious production:

The performance of Rebecca seems to me to have taken us further into the danger area instead of showing any improvement. I am unable to defend at a time when departmental costs and scene loads are in an acute state the load imposed by Rebecca on Design and Supply and the expenditure upon extras and costumes... the vast area of the hall and the stairway never justified the great expenditure of effort required in building and one is left with a very clear impression of reaching a point where the department must be accused of not knowing what it is doing.

=== Later life and work ===
Despite Barry's concerns, Cartier continued to work successfully in television, and at the 1957 Guild of Television Producers and Directors Awards (later known as the British Academy Television Awards, or BAFTAs) he was the winner of the Drama category. He made a brief return to filmmaking in 1958 when he directed the feature Passionate Summer, but he saw himself primarily as a television director, and it remained his favourite medium. "The essence of television is that you can control the viewer's response to a much greater extent than other media permit," he told The Times in 1958.

Cartier also directed several operas for the BBC, a genre for which he had a great passion. He oversaw adaptations of established operas such as Salome (1957) and Carmen (1962) as well as original productions written especially for television. Tobias and the Angel, written for the BBC by Sir Arthur Bliss and Christopher Hassall and produced by Cartier in 1960, won the Merit Award in the Salzburg Opera Prize at the 1962 Salzburg Festival.

Cartier continued to direct television dramas during the 1960s, although after Barry stepped down as Head of Drama in 1961, he lost much of his creative independence. Barry's successor, Sydney Newman, abolished the BBC's traditional producer-director role and split the responsibilities into separate posts, leaving directors such as Cartier with less control over their productions. Cartier also found himself assigned to direct episodes of regular drama series, as such as Maigret and Z-Cars.

Cartier was still able to direct several notable productions during the decade, including a number which explored the Nazi era in Germany from which he had escaped in 1933. These included the World War II dramas Cross of Iron (1961, dealing with the court martial of a U-boat captain in a British prisoner of war camp) and The July Plot (1964, about the 1944 plot to assassinate Hitler), as well as Firebrand (1967, about the 1933 Reichstag fire, an event Cartier had personally witnessed). He also began, for the first time, to direct pieces which dealt with the Holocaust, such as Doctor Korczak and the Children (Studio 4, 1962), concerning the Warsaw Ghetto orphanage, and The Joel Brand Story (1965, about Adolf Eichmann's 1944 offer to the Allies of the lives of 1 million Jews in exchange for 10,000 trucks). Other significant 1960s productions included adaptations of Anna Karenina (1961, starring Sean Connery and Claire Bloom) and Wuthering Heights (1962, a new version of Kneale's 1953 script, starring Bloom and Keith Michell). Lee Oswald – Assassin (1966) was a drama-documentary telling the story of Lee Harvey Oswald, based on the Warren Commission's findings, while Conversation at Night (1969) saw the first television acting appearance of Alec Guinness.

Cartier's career continued into the 1970s. In 1974, he directed episodes of Fall of Eagles; and his final credit came with the play Loyalties, screened in 1976. By this time, he had worked on more than 120 productions for the BBC. Subsequently, he worked for a time for the BBC's "purchased drama" department, advising on which plays and series might be bought-in from European broadcasters. Throughout his career, Cartier refused to work for commercial television: "I hate the idea of my creative work being constantly interrupted for commercial reasons, " he once commented. "I am an artist, not a salesman."

Cartier was married three times, lastly to Margaret Pepper from 1949 until his death. He had one daughter, Corinne, with Pepper, and another from a previous marriage. Cartier died on 7 June 1994, at the age of 90; his death was overshadowed in the media by that of Dennis Potter, another important figure in the history of British television drama, who died on the same day.

== Legacy ==
Nearly all of Cartier's 1950s television productions were performed live, and the majority of them were not recorded—he once described them as being "gone with the speed of light". Several of those which do survive have been highly regarded by later reviewers. In 2000, the British Film Institute (BFI) compiled a list of the 100 Greatest British Television Programmes of the 20th century. Voted on by a group of industry professionals, the list featured both Nineteen Eighty-Four and Quatermass and the Pit. In the accompanying analysis of each entry to the list, Nineteen Eighty-Four was described as "An early example of the power of television drama... Even now, the torture sequences retain their power to shock and disturb."

Nigel Kneale, scriptwriter of both of the Cartier dramas acclaimed by the BFI, felt that the productions would not have been as successful as they were had they been handled by any other director. "I don't think any of the things I wrote then would have come to anything much in other hands. In his they worked." Television historian Jason Jacobs, a lecturer in film and television studies at the University of Warwick, wrote in 2000 that Kneale and Cartier together created an entirely new, more expansive vision for British television drama in the 1950s.

It was the arrival of Nigel Kneale... and Rudolph Cartier... that challenged the intimate drama directly. Cartier is rightly recognised as a major influence on the visual development of British television drama... Cartier and Kneale had the ambition for their productions to affect a mass audience, and the scope of their attention was not confined to the 'cosy' aesthetics of intimacy. Cartier uses the close-up both to reveal emotions and as a shock device: a more threatening—and perhaps exhilarating—method than was used before. 'Intimacy' is reformulated by Cartier in terms of his power and control over the viewer—no longer a part of the family, but isolated in his home.

Cartier's pioneering use of an increased number of pre-filmed sequences to open out the studio-bound, live television drama productions of the 1950s is also praised by Lez Cooke. "While film inserts were being used in television drama from the early 1950s, Nineteen Eighty-Four represented the most extensive use of them in a TV play up to that time, and signalled Cartier's determination to extend the boundaries of TV drama." Similarly, his Times obituary stated that: "At a time when studio productions were usually as static as the conventional theatre, he was widely respected for a creative contribution to British television drama which gave it a new dimension."

In addition to his 1950s productions, several of Cartier's later works have also been regarded as influential. His 1962 production of Wuthering Heights was praised by Dennis Potter, then a television critic, who wrote in the Daily Herald newspaper that the production "was like a thunderstorm on the flat, dreary plains of the week's television... The howl of the wind against the windows, the muted pain of Claire Bloom as the wretched Cathy, and the hunted misery of Keith Mitchell as Heathcliff, made this a more than adequate offering of a great work." While Screenonline states that Lee Oswald–Assassin (1966) "could be argued [to be] of historical interest only", due to its basis in the flawed Warren Commission report, The Times praised it as being "possibly the first drama-documentary".

Not all of Cartier's work was so well regarded; in particular, his cinematic efforts have not achieved the level of praise of his television work. In the book America's Best, Britain's Finest: A Survey of Mixed Movies, critic John Howard Reid says of Cartier's 1958 film Passionate Summer: "It's hard to believe that... anyone could make such a dull movie. Yet this is precisely what director Rudolph Cartier has done. I've never heard of Mr Cartier before or since but presumably he made this brief foray into films from that synthetic world of ugly close-ups—TV."

Speaking to The Times in 1958, Cartier explained that television was still developing as a medium, and that part of his work was to help create the next generation of those who would produce television drama. "The BBC is producing producers as well as plays. They are feeling their way towards what television drama will one day be, and we are trying to create a generation of writers who study the medium." His 1994 obituary in the same newspaper judged that he had been successful in creating a lasting influence on later producers, describing his 1962 production of the opera Carmen as "an example and inspiration to a younger generation of television producers".

In 1990, the BBC Two arts magazine programme The Late Show produced an edition which featured a retrospective of Cartier's work, including a new interview with the director discussing his career. A revised version of this feature was screened on BBC Two under the title Rudolph Cartier: A Television Pioneer on 1 July 1994, followed by a tribute screening of the surviving telerecording copy of the second performance of Nineteen Eighty-Four.

== Selected filmography ==
=== Screenwriter ===
- The Game of Love (dir. Victor Janson, 1928)
- Tales from the Vienna Woods (dir. Jaap Speyer, 1928)
- Mascots (dir. Felix Basch, 1929) – based on an operetta by Georg Okonkowski and Walter Bromme
- The Smuggler's Bride of Mallorca (dir. Hans Behrendt, 1929)
- Im Prater blühen wieder die Bäume (dir. E. W. Emo, 1929)
- The Tiger Murder Case (dir. Johannes Meyer, 1930)
- The Shot in the Sound Film Studio (dir. Alfred Zeisler, 1930) – based on a novel by Curt Siodmak
- The Copper (dir. Richard Eichberg, 1930)
- Täter gesucht (dir. Carl Heinz Wolff, 1931) – based on a novel by Frank Arnau
- Das gelbe Haus des King-Fu (dir. Karl Grune, 1931) – based on a play by Josef Matthäus Velter
- The Yellow House of Rio (dir. Karl Grune, Robert Péguy, 1931) – based on a play by Josef Matthäus Velter
- Express 13 (dir. Alfred Zeisler, 1931)
- Tropical Nights (dir. Leo Mittler, 1931) – based on Victory by Joseph Conrad
- The Squeaker (dir. Karel Lamač, Martin Frič, 1931) – based on The Squeaker by Edgar Wallace
- Salto Mortale (dir. E. A. Dupont, 1931) – based on a novel by Alfred Machard
- The Paw (dir. Hans Steinhoff, 1931)
  - The Man with the Claw (dir. Nunzio Malasomma, 1931)
- A Shot at Dawn (dir. Alfred Zeisler, 1932) – based on a play by Harry Jenkins
  - Coup de feu à l'aube (dir. Serge de Poligny, 1932) – based on a play by Harry Jenkins
- The Star of Valencia (dir. Serge de Poligny, 1933)
  - The Star of Valencia (dir. Alfred Zeisler, 1933)
- The Man from Morocco (dir. Mutz Greenbaum, 1945)
- Corridor of Mirrors (dir. Terence Young, 1948) – based on a novel by Chris Massie
- The Avenger (dir. Karl Anton, 1960) – based on novel The Avenger by Edgar Wallace

=== Director ===
- Teilnehmer antwortet nicht (co-director: Marc Sorkin, 1932)
- Invisible Opponent (1933)
  - The Oil Sharks (co-director: Henri Decoin, 1933)
- Arrow to the Heart (1952, TV film) – based on the novel Unruhige Nacht by Albrecht Goes
- The Quatermass Experiment (1953, TV miniseries)
- Wuthering Heights (1953, TV film) – based on the novel Wuthering Heights by Emily Brontë
- Nineteen Eighty-Four (1954, TV film) – based on the novel 1984 by George Orwell
- Quatermass II (1955, TV miniseries)
- Passionate Summer (1958) – based on the novel The Shadow and the Peak by Richard Mason
- Quatermass and the Pit (1958–1959, TV miniseries)
- Adventure Story (1961, TV film) – based on the play Adventure Story by Terence Rattigan
- Maigret (1961–1963, TV series, 3 episodes) – based on Maigret novels by Georges Simenon
