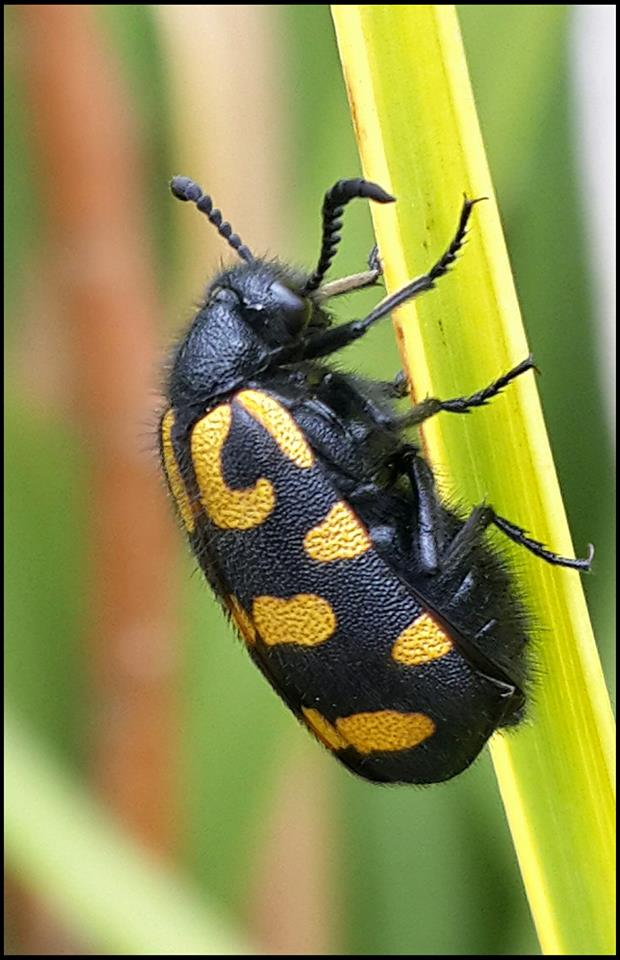

Scientific classification
- Kingdom: Animalia
- Phylum: Arthropoda
- Class: Insecta
- Order: Coleoptera
- Suborder: Polyphaga
- Infraorder: Cucujiformia
- Family: Meloidae
- Genus: Ceroctis
- Species: C. capensis

Binomial name
- Ceroctis capensis (Linnaeus, 1764)

Synonyms
- Meloe capensis Linnaeus, 1764

= Ceroctis capensis =

Species of beetle

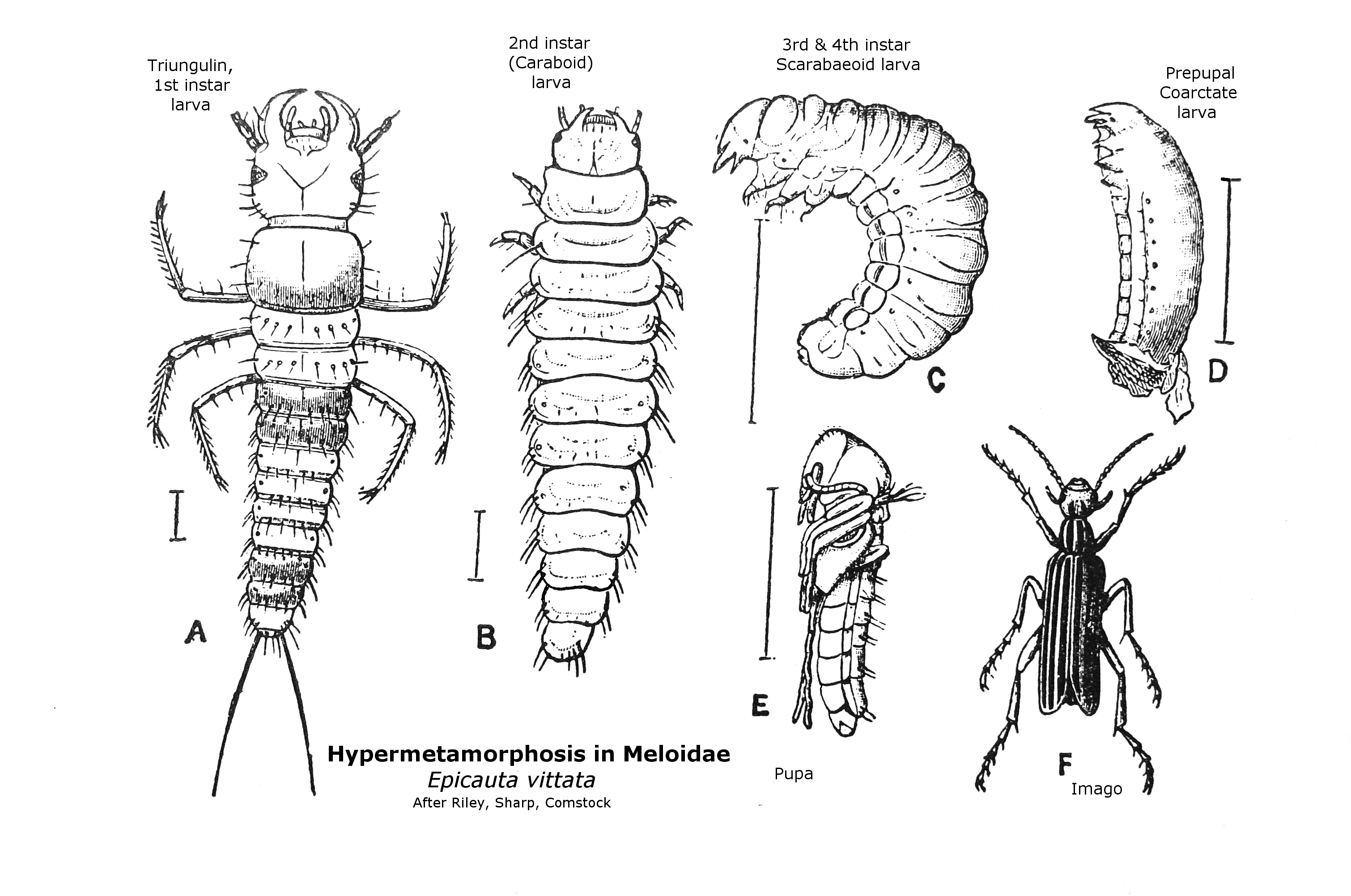
Triungulin, later larval, and other instars of a Meloid beetle

Ceroctis capensis, or spotted blister beetle, is diurnal and endemic to Southern Africa occurring in diverse habitats, and belonging to the Meloidae or Blister beetle family. It secretes a toxic liquid from its leg joints when roughly handled, blistering human skin. This species somewhat resembles Mylabris oculata, a member of the same family.

This species is found on a wide variety of plants, flying between flowers and consuming floral parts, showing a preference for the legume family and Watsonia species. It has a body length of some 12 mm while its elytra are black with yellow spots, and head, antennae and legs are black.

Adults of the Meloidae are vegetarian, flying unhurriedly between plants, protected by their aposematic colours which warn of poison. Their larvae, though, parasitise or prey on locust egg packets, or consume the eggs, pollen and honey of bees. Newly hatched triungulin larvae climb up plant stalks where they emit pheromones similar to those of a female bee. They clamber onto duped male bees and transfer to female bees when mating takes place - the female bees then carry the larvae back to her nest. Other species lay their eggs at the entrance to the bee's nest.

== Life history ==
Females lay their eggs in the soil, using jaws and legs to dig a hole. Eggs hatch into minute and very active six-legged larvae which search for buried locust and grasshopper egg-pods. Once these are located the larvae burrow down and enter the pod, sloughing their skins and changing their appearance to that of fat slugs with very short legs. These proceed to feed on the eggs, effectively limiting Orthoptera numbers. When fully developed the Ceroctis larva pupates in an underground chamber from which the adult beetle emerges. A species of Ceroctis, C. groendali is a nest parasite of the pollen wasp Ceramius lichtensteinii.

== Pharmacology ==
The elytra of these beetles are ground fine and occasionally used as an aphrodisiac or poison by the Bantu, the active principle being cantharidin, a terpenoid painfully irritating to mucous membranes such as those of the gastrointestinal and urinary tracts, and damaging to the kidneys. Most blister beetle species are protected by cantharidin. Spanish Fly or Lytta vesicatoria also belongs to the family Meloidae. The toxic nature of blister beetles was recorded as far back as the 4th century BC by Hippocrates. In the late 1700s the Marquis de Sade was charged with poisoning of participants in an orgy by the use of cantharidin.

Cantharidin is toxic to vertebrates, the aposematic colouration of the beetles being a clear warning. Symptoms of poisoning include intestinal and urinary tract haemorrhage, and sometimes death. Horses are particularly susceptible to cantharidin poisoning and may die from eating dry hay or when grazing on alfalfa or lucerne, when they may inadvertently swallow some of the beetles.

Cantharidin is used to treat warts that are resistant to other treatment, and although not well-researched it is sufficiently efficacious to be recommended by various medical authorities. It is also the active ingredient of Cantharidine Hair Oil, a hair tonic widely sold in India.
