= Potion =

Magical type of liquified medicine or drug

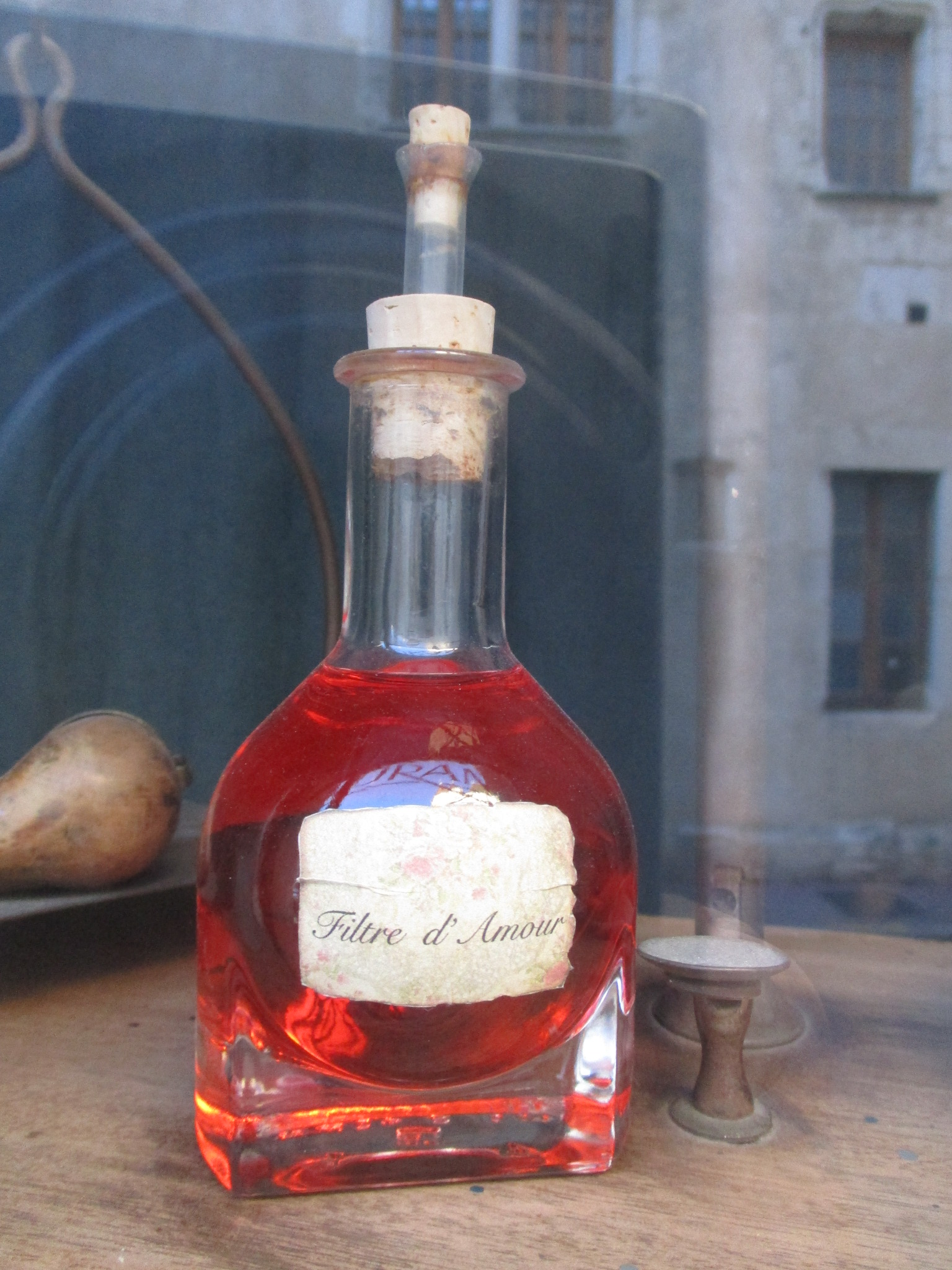
A bottle of colored liquid labelled as a love potion

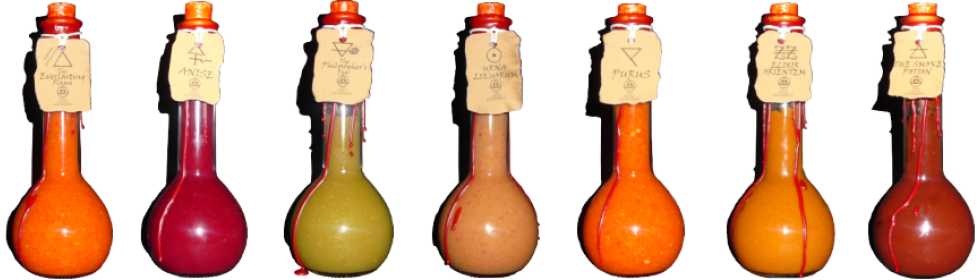
A collection of vials labelled as potions

A potion is a liquid that contains "medicine, poison, or something that is supposed to have magic powers." It derives from the Latin word potio which refers to a drink or the act of drinking. The term philtre is also used, often specifically to describe a love potion, a potion that is believed to induce feelings of love or attraction in the one who drinks it. Throughout history, there have been several types of potions for a range of purposes. Reasons for taking potions have included curing an illness, securing immortality, and trying to inspire love. These potions, while often ineffective or poisonous, occasionally had some degree of medicinal benefits depending on what they sought to fix and the type and amount of ingredients used. Common ingredients in historical potions included Spanish fly, nightshade plants, cannabis, and opium.

During the 17th to 19th century, it was common in Europe to see peddlers offering potions for ailments ranging from heartbreak to the plague. These were eventually dismissed as quackery. Prostitutes, courtesans, enchanters and midwives were also known to distribute potions.

== Etymology ==
The word potion has its origins in the Latin word potus, an irregular past participle of potare, meaning "to drink". This evolved to the word potionem (nominative potio) meaning either "a potion, a drinking" or a "poisonous draught, magic potion". In Ancient Greek, the word for both drugs and potions was "pharmaka" or "pharmakon". In the 12th century, the French had the word pocion, meaning "potion", "draught", or "medicine". By the 13th century, this word became pocioun, referring to either a medicinal drink, or a dose of liquid medicine (or poison).

The word "potion" is also cognate with the Spanish words pocion with the same meaning, and ponzoña, meaning "poison"; The word pozione was originally the same word for both "poison" and "potion" in Italian, but by the early 15th century in Italy, potion began to be known specifically as a magical or enchanted drink.

== Administrators of potions ==
The practice of administering potions has had a long history of being illegalised. Despite these laws, there have been several different administrators of potions across history.

=== Quacks ===
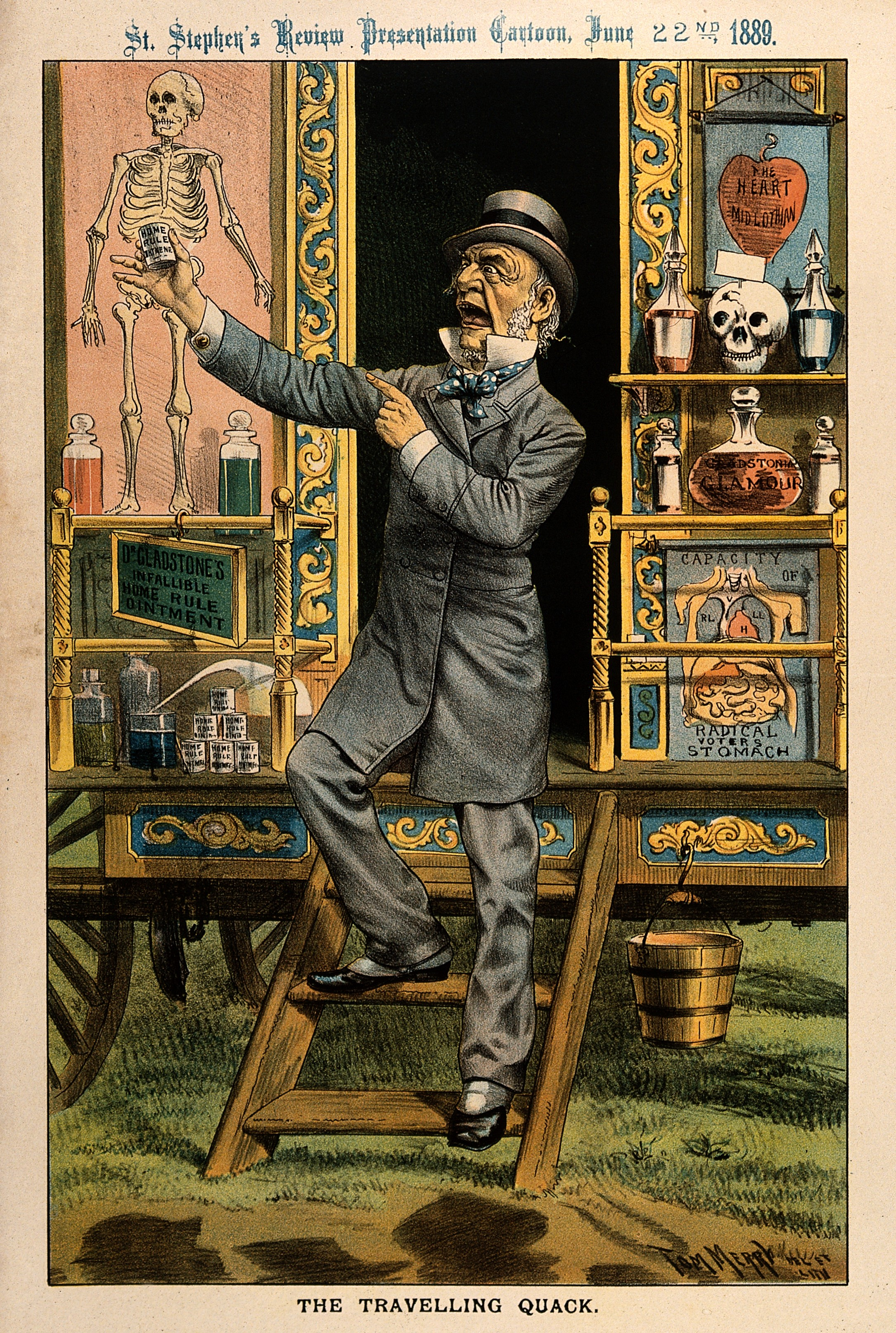
A quack or charlatan doctor selling potions from his caravan in 19th century Ireland

Quacks or charlatans are people who sell "medical methods that do not work and are only intended to make money". In Europe in the 15th century it was also common to see long-distance peddlers, who sold supposedly magical healing potions and elixirs. During the Great Plague of London in the 17th century, quacks sold many fake potions promising either cures or immunity. Because pills looked less trustworthy to the public, potions were often the top sellers of quacks. These potions often included bizarre ingredients such as floral pomanders and the smoke of fragrant woods. The well known Wessex quack Vilbert was known to sell love potions made of pigeon hearts. By the 18th century in England, it was common for middle class households to stock potions that claimed to solve a variety of ailments. Quackery grew to its height in the 19th century.

=== Pharmacists ===
In 18th- and 19th-century Britain, pharmacies or apothecaries were often a cheaper, more accessible option for medical treatment than doctors. Potions distributed by chemists for illnesses were often derived from herbs and plants, and based on old beliefs and remedies.

Prior to the Pharmacy Act 1868 anybody could become a pharmacist or chemist. Since the practice was unregulated, potions were often made from scratch.

Potions were additionally used to cure illness in livestock. One potion found in a 19th-century pharmacist's recipe book was to be used for "lambs of about 7 years old" and contains chalk, pomegranate and opium.

=== The role of women in distributing potions ===
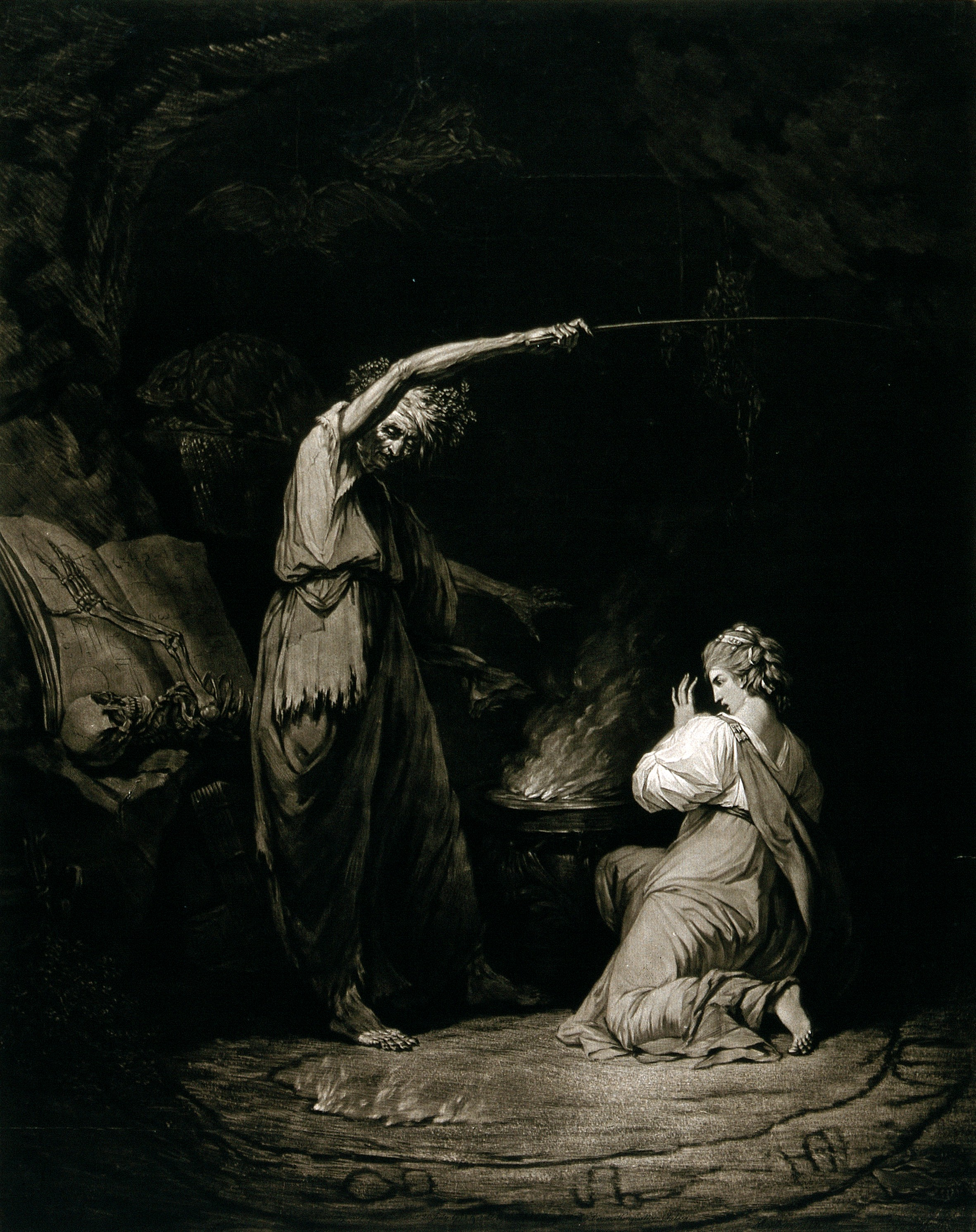
1773 painting of a witch reciting a spell over a cauldron

There was a strict hierarchy in the medical community of Europe during the 12th to 15th centuries. Male doctors were the most respected and paid followed by female apothecaries, barber-surgeons and surgeons. Women were often the main way that individuals who could not afford doctors or apothecaries could gain medical treatment Potions, in addition to calming teas or soup, were a common homemade treatment made by women. When unable to go to a female house member, early modern people would often go to the wise women of their village. Wise women (who were often supposed witches) were knowledgeable in health care and could administer potions, lotions or salves in addition to performing prayers or chants. This was often free of charge or significantly less expensive than the potions of apothecaries.

The limited jobs available to women during the 17th to 18th century in Europe often involved a knowledge of potions as an additional way to gain a financial income. Jobs that often involved the selling of love potions included prostitutes, courtesans, enchanters and midwives. These practices varied by region. In Rome, up until the period of the civil wars, the only physicians were drug-sellers, enchanters and midwives. In Greece, retired courtesans often both created potions and worked as midwives. Prostitutes in Europe were often expected to be an expert in magic and administer love potions.

=== Self-administration ===
In the Middle Ages and the early modern period, using potions to induce sterility and abortion was widely practiced in Europe. The majority of abortive potions were made using emmenagogue herbs (herbs used to stimulate menstruation) which were intended to cause a period and end a pregnancy. Additionally abortive potions could also be prepared by infusion of herbs or other plants. For example, the willow tree was a common ingredient in these potions, as it was fabled to cause sterility. Several key theological and legal literature of the time condemned this practice, including Visigothic law and the Church.

Many herbal potions containing emmenagogues did not contain abortifacients (substances that induce abortion) and were instead used to cure amenorrhoea (a lack of period). There are several different types of literature in the humoral tradition that propose the use of herbal potions or suppositories to provoke menstruation.

== Famous potion makers ==
=== Giulia Tofana and Gironima Spana ===
Giulia Tofana (1581–1651) was an Italian poisoner, known as the inventor of the famous poison Aqua Tofana. Born in Sicily, she invented and started to sell the poison in Palermo in Sicily. She later established herself in Rome, where she continued the business, specialising in selling to women in abusive marriages who wanted to become widows. She died peacefully in 1651 and left the business to her stepdaughter Gironima Spana, who expanded it to a substantial business in the 1650s. The organization was exposed in 1659 and resulted in the famous Spana Prosecution, which became a subject of sensationalistic mythologization for centuries.

=== Paula de Eguiluz ===
Paula de Eguiluz was born into slavery in Santo Domingo, Dominican Republic in the 17th century. Within the area in which she lived, sickness and disease ravaged the towns and major cities. Paula de Eguiluz decided to research and find her own cures to these maladies. Because of this, she is widely known for being involved in health care and healing.

Once her healing and health care practice took off, she started to sell potions and serums to clients. de Eguiluz's business attracted a following and slowly got her into a bit of trouble.

Due to Paula's healing accomplishments, she was arrested approximately 3 times. During these inquisitions, she was forced to tell the jury that she performed witchcraft. In response to these false confessions, she was imprisoned and whipped several times.

=== Catherine Monvoisin ===
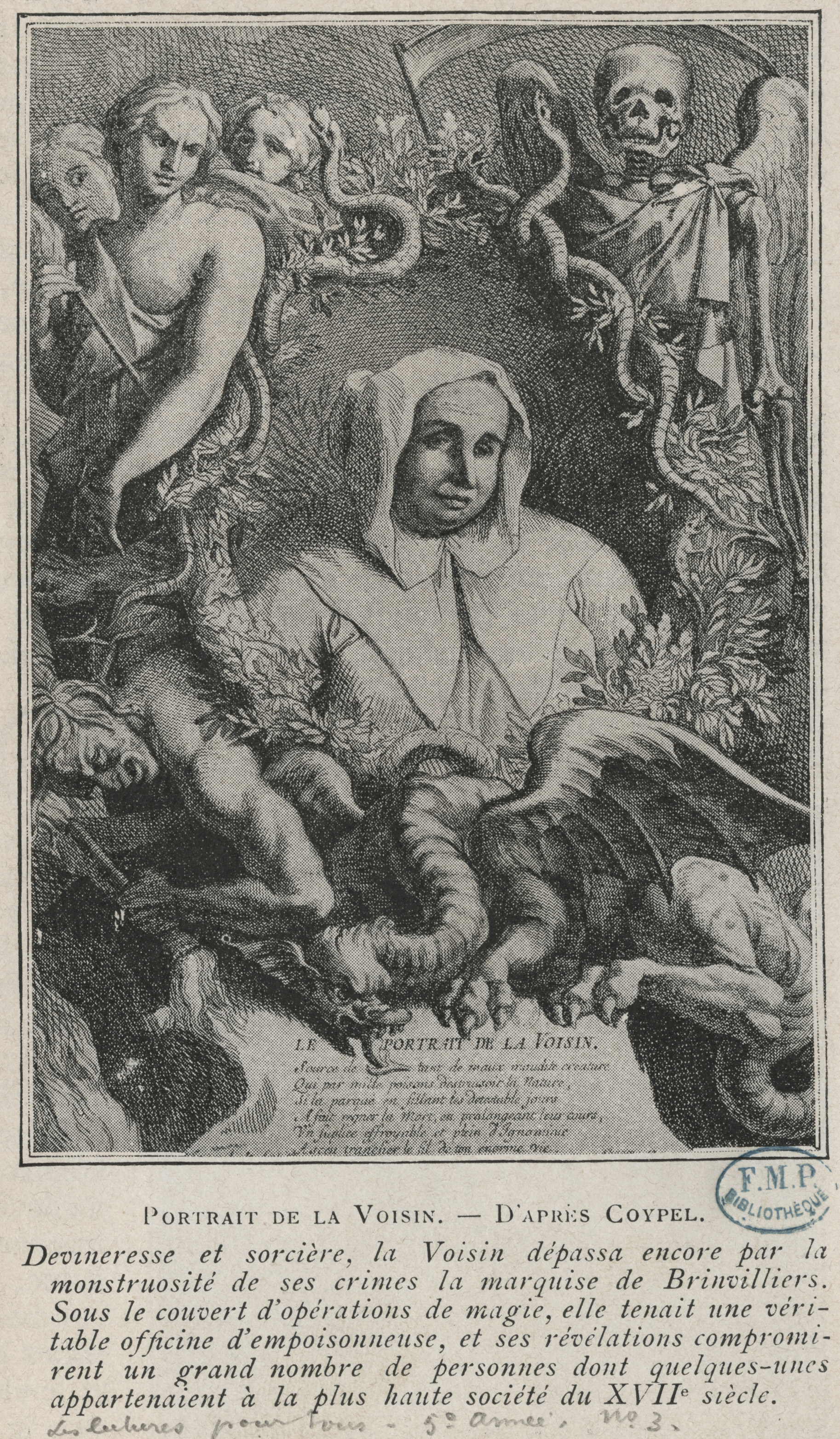
Contemporary portrait engraving of 17th century sorceress and poisoner Catherine Monvoison "La Voisin" - Guillaume Chasteau after Antoine Coypel

Catherine Monvoisin, better known to some as La Voisin, was born within the year 1640 in France.

Catherine Monvoisin married Antoine Monvoisin who was a jeweler in Paris. His business plummeted and Catherine had to find work in order for her and her family to survive. She had a knack for reading people very accurately coupled with chiromancy and utilized her skills in order to make money.

La Voisin would read people's horoscopes and perform abortions, but she also sold potions and poisons to her clients. Her work quickly became well known throughout France and people would quickly become her clients. Around the year 1665, her fortune telling was questioned by Saint Vincent de Paul's Order, but she was quick to dismiss the allegations of witchcraft.

Catherine would then begin making potions whether it be for love, murder, or everyday life. Her love potion consisted of bones, the teeth of moles, human blood, Spanish fly beetles, and even small amounts of human remains. Her predecessor and major influence was Giulia Tofana.

On March 12, 1679, Catherine was arrested Notre- Dame Bonne- Nouvelle due to a string of incidents involving her and her potions. She confessed her crimes of murder and told authorities a majority of everything they needed to know about the people she knowingly murdered.

On February 22, 1680, La Voisin was sentenced to a public death wherein she was to be burned as the stake for witchcraft.

=== Jacqueline Felicie ===
Jacqueline Felice de Almania was tried in Italy in 1322 for the unlicensed practice of medicine. She was mainly accused of doing a learned male physicians job and accepting a fee. This job involved "examining urine by its physical appearance; touching the body; and prescribing potions, digestives, and laxatives." Eight witnesses testified to her medical experience and wisdom. However, as she had not attended university, her knowledge was dismissed. Jacqueline Felice was then found guilty and fined and excommunicated from the church.

== Popular types of potions ==
Emotions such as anger, fear, and sadness are universal and as such potions have been created across history and cultures in response to these human emotions.

=== Love potion ===
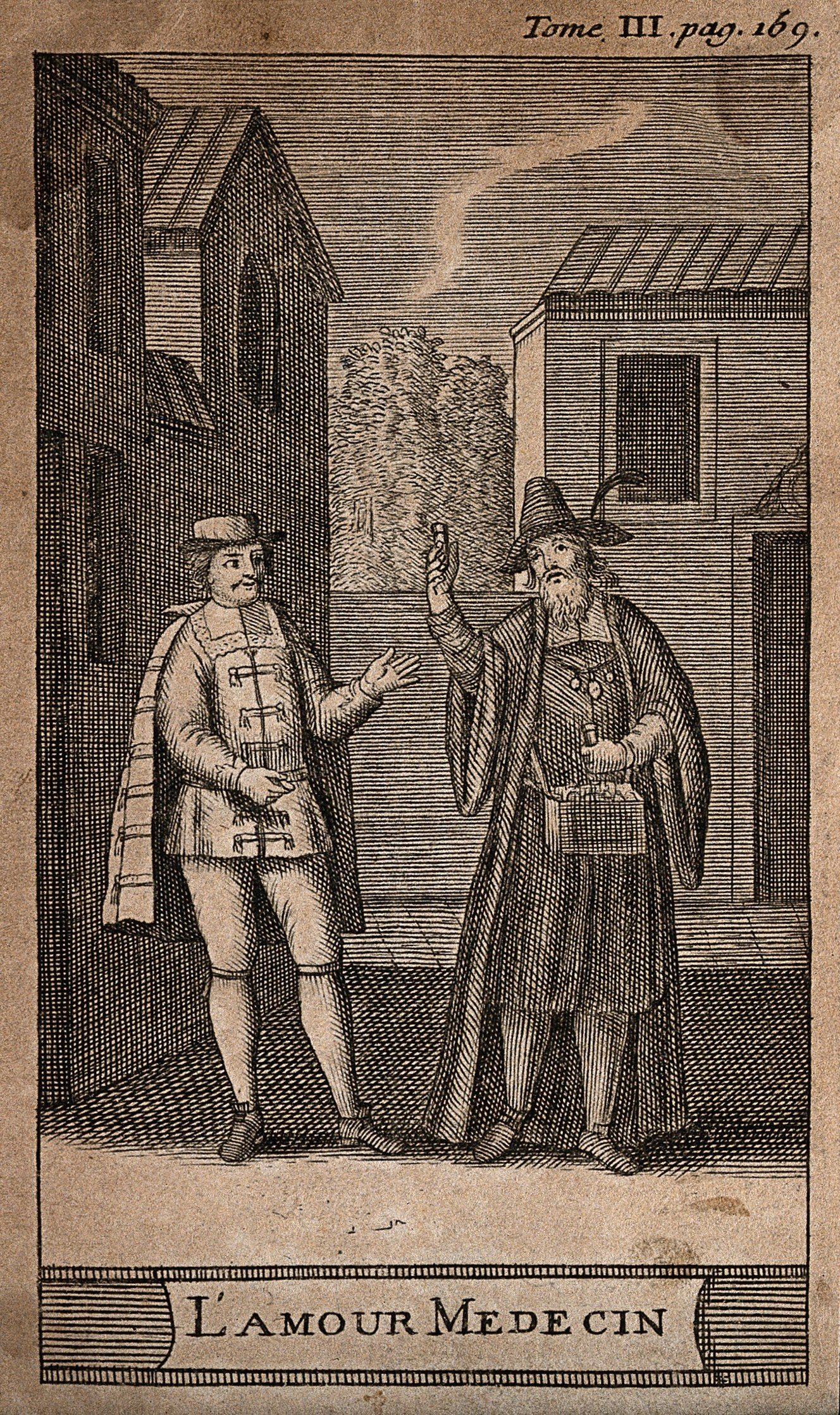
A young man buying a potion to induce falling in love from a street medicine vendor

Love potions have been used throughout history and cultures. Scandinavians often used love-philtres, which is documented in the Norse poem The Lay of Gudrun.

In 17th-century Cartagena, Afro-Mexican curer (curanderos/as) and other Indigenous healers could gain an income and status from selling spells and love potions to women trying to secure men and financial stability. These love potions were sold to women of all social classes, who often wished to gain sexual agency.

=== Restorative potion ===
==== Confectio Alchermes ====
In the early 9th century, Arab physician Yuhanna ̄ Ibn Masawaih used the dye kermes to create a potion called Confectio Alchermes. The potion was "intended for the caliph and his court and not for commoners." The potion was intended to cure heart palpitations, restore strength and cure madness and depression.

During the Renaissance in Europe, Confectio Alchermes was used widely. Recipes for the potion appeared in the work of the popular English apothecary Nicholas Culpeper and the official pharmacopoeia handbooks of London and Amsterdam. Queen Elizabeth's French ambassador was even treated with the remedy; however, the recipe was altered to include a "unicorn's horn" (possibly a ground-up narwhal tusk) in addition to the traditional ingredients. The ingredients for the potion mainly included ambergris, cinnamon, aloes, gold leaf, musk, pulverized lapis lazuli, and white pearls.

==== St Paul's potion ====
St Paul's potion was intended to cure epilepsy, catalepsy and stomach problems. Many ingredients used in the potion had medicinal value. According to Toni Mount the list of ingredients included "liquorice, sage, willow, roses, fennel, cinnamon, ginger, cloves, cormorant blood, mandrake, dragon's blood and three kinds of pepper".

Many of these ingredients still have medicinal value in the 21st century. Liquorice can be used to treat coughs and bronchitis. Sage can help memory and improve blood flow to the brain. Willow contains salicylic acid, which is a component of aspirin. Fennel, cinnamon and ginger are all carminatives, which help relieve gas in the intestines. The cormorant blood adds iron to treat anemia. If used in small doses, Mandrake is a good sleeping draught (though in large doses Mandrake can be poisonous.) Dragon's blood refers to the bright red resin of the tree Dracaena draco. According to Toni Mount "it has antiseptic, antibiotic, anti-viral and wound-healing properties, and it is still used in some parts of the world to treat dysentery."

=== Immortality potion ===
Creating a potion for immortality, was a common pursuit of alchemists throughout history. The Elixir of Life is a famous potion that aimed to create eternal youth. During the Chinese dynasties, this elixir of life was often recreated and drunk by emperors, nobles and officials. In India, there is a myth of the potion amrita, a drink of immortality made out of nectar.

=== Psychedelic potions ===
==== Ayahuasca ====
Ayahuasca, is a hallucinogenic plant-based potion used in many parts of the world. It was first created by indigenous South Americans from the Amazon basin as a spiritual medicine. The potion was often administered by a shaman during a ceremony. The potion contains the boiled stems of the ayahuasca vine and leaves from the chacruna plant. Chacruna contains dimethyltryptamine (DMT), a psychedelic drug. The potion caused users to vomit or 'purge' and induced hallucinations.

== Folklore ==
Potions or mixtures are common within many of local mythologies. In particular, references to love potions are common in many cultures. Yusufzai witches, for example, would bathe a recently deceased leatherworker and sell the water to those seeking a male partner; this practice is said to exist in a modified form in modern times.

== Famous potions in literature ==
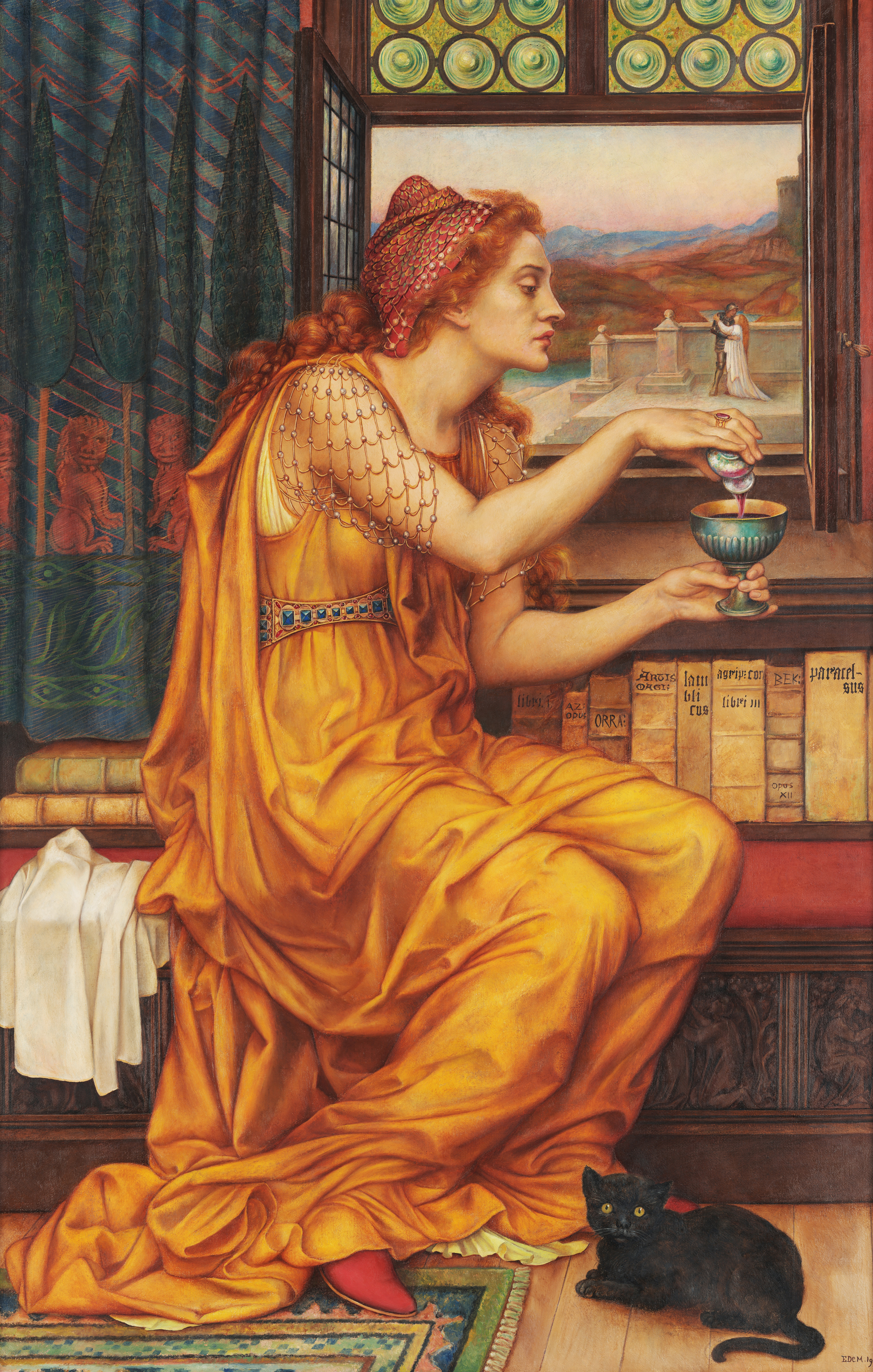
The Love Potion by Evelyn De Morgan.

Potions have played a critical role in many pieces of literature. Shakespeare wrote potions into many of his plays including a love potion in A Midsummer Night's Dream, poison in Hamlet, and Juliet takes a potion to fake her death in Romeo and Juliet.

In the fairytale "The Little Mermaid" by Hans Christian Andersen, the Little Mermaid wishes to become human and have an immortal soul. She visits the Sea Witch who sells her a potion, in exchange for which she cuts out the Little Mermaid's tongue. The Sea Witch makes the potion using her own blood that she cuts from her breast. She warns the Little Mermaid that it will feel as if she had been cut with a sword when her fin becomes legs, that she will never be able to become a mermaid again, and risks turning into seafoam and not having an immortal soul if she fails to win the Prince's love. The Little Mermaid decides to take the potion which successfully turns her into a human so that she can try to win the love of the Prince and an immortal soul.

In the novella The Strange Case of Dr. Jekyll and Mr. Hyde by Robert Louis Stevenson, Dr. Henry Jekyll creates a potion that transforms him into an evil version of himself called Edward Hyde. Dr. Jekyll does not explain how he created this potion because he felt his "discoveries were incomplete," he only indicates that it requires a "particular salt." He uses the potion successfully to go back and forth between his normal self, Dr. Jekyll, and his evil self, Mr. Hyde.

In the Harry Potter series, potions also play a main role. The students are required to attend potion classes, taught by Severus Snape and Horace Slughorn and knowledge of potions often becomes a factor for many of the characters. Throughout the course of the story, several characters take Polyjuice Potion to impersonate other characters, while the use of Felix Felicis potion in Book 6 helps Harry Potter gain vital information about horcruxes.

In the Asterix comic album series, an unnamed coastal village in Armorica, Gaul (present-day Brittany, France), in the year 50 BC, holds out against the invading Romans (led by Julius Caesar), with the help of a magic potion. This magic potion, brewed by the local druid Getafix, temporarily gives the recipient superhuman strength. The title character, and his friend Obelix, go on adventures and missions, aided by this magic potion. The druid uses many ingredients, most notably mistletoe, to brew this potion.

== Popular ingredients used in potions ==
=== Solanaceous plants ===
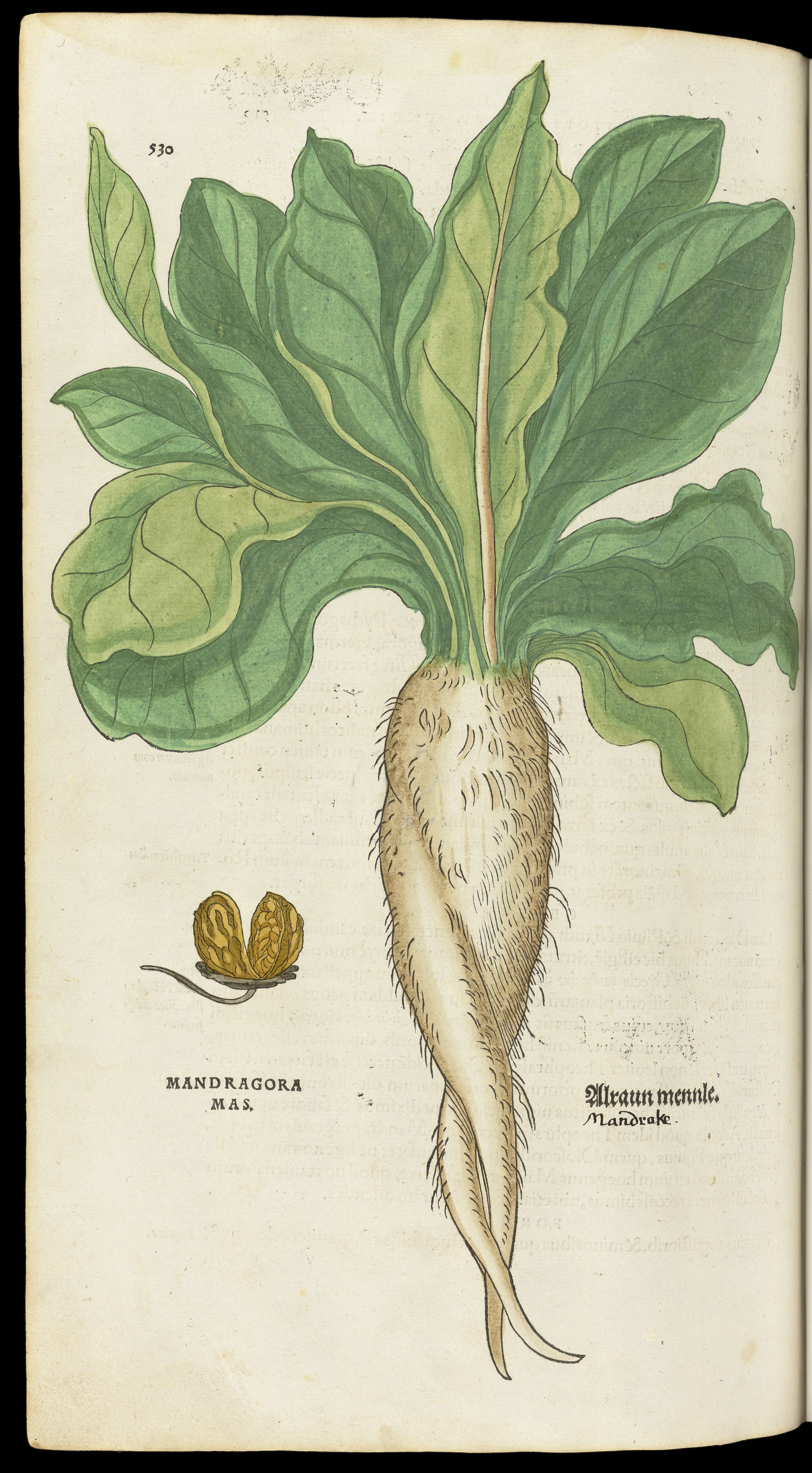
An illustration of a Mandrake plant

In the 11th century, plants belonging to the nightshade family Solanaceae were often used as an ingredients in the potions - aphrodisiac or otherwise - and flying ointments of witches. The specific nightshades used in such concoctions were usually tropane alkaloid-containing species belonging to the Old World tribes Hyoscyameae and Mandragoreae. These potions were known as pharmaka diabolika ("devilish drugs").

The root of Mandragora officinarum, the celebrated mandrake, fabled in legend to shriek when uprooted, was often used to prepare sleeping potions, although it could prove poisonous in excess, due to its tropane alkaloid content. M. officinarum is native to the Mediterranean region. Administered in small doses mandrake root has been used in folk medicine as an analgesic, an aphrodisiac and a remedy for infertility. Larger doses act as an entheogen of the deliriant class, having the potential to cause profound confusion and dysphoria characterised by realistic hallucinations of an unpleasant character. Classical and Renaissance authors have left certain accounts of the use of the plant by witches in the preparation of potions intended variously to excite love, cause insanity or even kill. Scopolamine, a toxic, deliriant alkaloid present in (and named after) Scopolia carniolica and also present in Mandragora, Hyoscyamus and other Solanaceae, was used by the infamous Dr. Crippen to kill his wife.

=== Spanish fly ===
In ancient Greece, the Spanish fly (also known as cantharides) was crushed with herbs and used in love potions. It was believed to be effective due to the bodily warmth that resulted from ingesting it. However, this was actually a result of inflammation from toxins in the tissues of the beetle. Ferdinand II of Aragon drank many potions and elixirs containing the Spanish fly.

=== Cochineal ===
Cochineal, another type of dye, replaced kermes as an ingredient in Confectio Alchermes in the 17th and 18th centuries. Cochineal was also heavily used as an ingredient in potions for jaundice. Jaundice potions were a mix of Cochineal, cream of tartar and Venetian soap and patients were directed to take it three times a day.

=== Cannabis and opium ===
Cannabis and opium has been used in potions throughout human history. Potions containing cannabis and/or opium were particularly popular in Arabia, Persia, and Muslim India after the arrival of the drugs around the 9th century. Cannabis and opium were a common ingredient used in potions and tinctures sold by apothecaries in 19th-century Europe, as the ingredients made patients feel better, and the addictive nature of the drug meant it sold well. Nepenthes pharmakon is a famous type of magical potion recorded in Homer's Odyssey, intended to cure sorrow. In Ancient Greek Pharmakon was the word for medicine and Nepenthes meant no (ne) sorrow (penthes). Since the 18th century it is believed to be made from opium.

== See also ==
- Alchemy in art and entertainment
- Asterix
- Extract
- Herbal medicine
- Herbal tea
- History of pharmacy
- Spagyric
- The Love Potion
