= Cantharidin =

Chemical compound

Clinical data
- Trade names: Ycanth, others
- License data: US DailyMed: Cantharidin
- Routes of administration: Topical

Legal status
- Legal status: US: ℞-only

Identifiers
- DrugBank: DB12328
- CompTox Dashboard (EPA): DTXSID7041752
- ECHA InfoCard: 100.000.240

Chemical and physical data
- Formula: C_{10}H_{12}O_{4}
- Molar mass: 196.202 g·mol^{−1}

Cantharidin

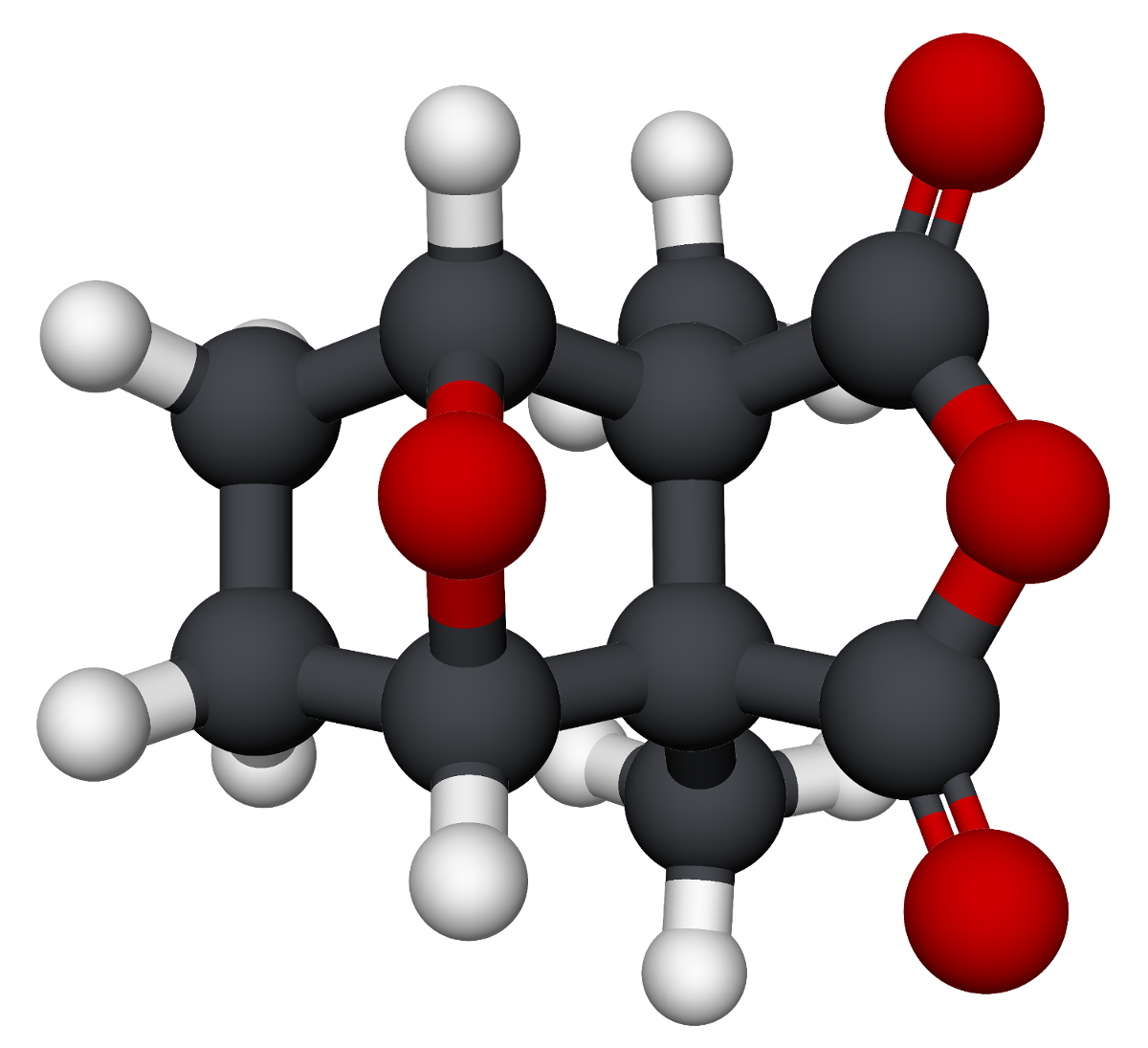

Names
- Preferred IUPAC name (3aR,4S,7R,7aS)-3a,7a-Dimethylhexahydro-4,7-epoxy[2]benzofuran-1,3-dione
- Other names: Cantharidin; Spanish fly; Ycanth

Identifiers
CAS Number	56-25-7
3D model (JSmol)	Interactive image
Beilstein Reference	85302
ChEBI	CHEBI:64213
ChEMBL	ChEMBL48449
ChemSpider	2297293
ECHA InfoCard	100.000.240
EC Number	200-263-3
KEGG	C16778
PubChem CID	5944
UNII	IGL471WQ8P
CompTox Dashboard (EPA)	DTXSID7041752
- InChI: InChI=1S/C10H12O4/c1-9-5-3-4-6(13-5)10(9,2)8(12)14-7(9)11/h5-6H,3-4H2,1-2H3/t5-,6+,9-,10+ Key: DHZBEENLJMYSHQ-YUMGAWCOSA-N
- SMILES: O=C2OC([C@@]1(C)[C@@H]3CC[C@@H](O3)[C@]12C)=O

Properties
Chemical formula	C_{10}H_{12}O_{4}
Molar mass	196.202 g·mol^{−1}
Density	1.41 g/cm^{3}
Melting point	212 °C (414 °F; 485 K)

Pharmacology
ATC code	None
Routes of administration	Topical
Legal status	NZ: Class A; US: ℞-only

Hazards
- Occupational safety and health (OHS/OSH)
Main hazards	Highly toxic
- GHS labelling
Pictograms	(GHS06: Toxic) (GHS07: Exclamation mark)
Signal word	Danger
Hazard statements	H300, H315, H319, H335
Precautionary statements	P261, P264, P270, P271, P280, P301+P310, P302+P352, P304+P340, P305+P351+P338, P312, P321, P330, P332+P313, P337+P313, P362, P403+P233, P405, P501
NFPA 704 (fire diamond)	4 1 1
- Lethal dose or concentration (LD, LC)
LD_{50} (median dose)	0.03–0.5 mg/kg (human)
- Except where otherwise noted, data are given for materials in their standard state (at 25 °C [77 °F], 100 kPa). verify (what is ?) Infobox references

Cantharidin is an odorless, colorless fatty substance of the terpenoid class, which is secreted by many species of blister beetles. (Note: Including broadly in genus Epicauta, genus Berberomeloe, and in species Lytta vesicatoria ("Spanish fly"). False blister beetles, cardinal beetles, and soldier beetles also produce cantharidin.) Its main current use in pharmacology is treating molluscum contagiosum and warts topically. It is a burn agent, poisonous in large doses. It has been historically used as an aphrodisiac (in preparations sold under the name "Spanish fly"). In its natural form, cantharidin is secreted by the male blister beetle, and given to the female as a copulatory gift during mating. Afterwards, the female beetle covers her eggs with it as a defense against predators.

Poisoning from cantharidin is a significant veterinary concern, especially in horses, but cantharidin can also be poisonous to humans if taken internally (where the source is usually experimental self-exposure). Externally, cantharidin is a potent vesicant (blistering agent), exposure to which can cause severe chemical burns. Properly dosed and applied, the same properties have also been used therapeutically, for instance, for treatment of skin conditions, such as molluscum contagiosum infection of the skin.

Cantharidin is classified as an extremely hazardous substance in the United States, and is subject to strict reporting requirements by facilities that produce, store, or use it in significant quantities.

== Chemistry ==
=== Structure and nomenclature ===
Cantharidin, from the Greek kantharis, for beetle, is an odorless, colorless natural product with solubility in various organic solvents, but only slight solubility in water. Its skeleton is tricyclic, formally, a tricyclo-[5.2.1.0^{2,6}]decane skeleton. Its functionalities include a carboxylic acid anhydride (−CO−O−CO−) substructure in one of its rings, as well as a bridging ether in its bicyclic ring system.

=== Distribution and availability ===
The level of cantharidin in blister beetles can be quite variable. Among blister beetles of the genus Epicauta in Colorado, E. pennsylvanica contains about 0.2 mg, E. maculata contains 0.7 mg, and E. immaculata contains 4.8 mg per beetle; males also contain higher levels than females.

Males of Berberomeloe majalis have higher level of cantharidin per beetle: 64.22 ± 51.28 mg/g (dry weight) and 9.10 ± 12.64 mg/g (d. w.). Cantharidin content in haemolymph is also higher in males (80.9 ± 106.5 μg/g) than in females (20.0 ± 41.5 μg/g).

=== Laboratory synthesis ===
There have been multiple synthetic approaches to achieve cantharidin in the lab. A common strategy employed by different total synthesis methods is to begin with a Diels-Alder cycloaddition reaction to form the six-membered ring. The starting material often utilizes a furan as the diene, giving the formation of a bicyclic ring.

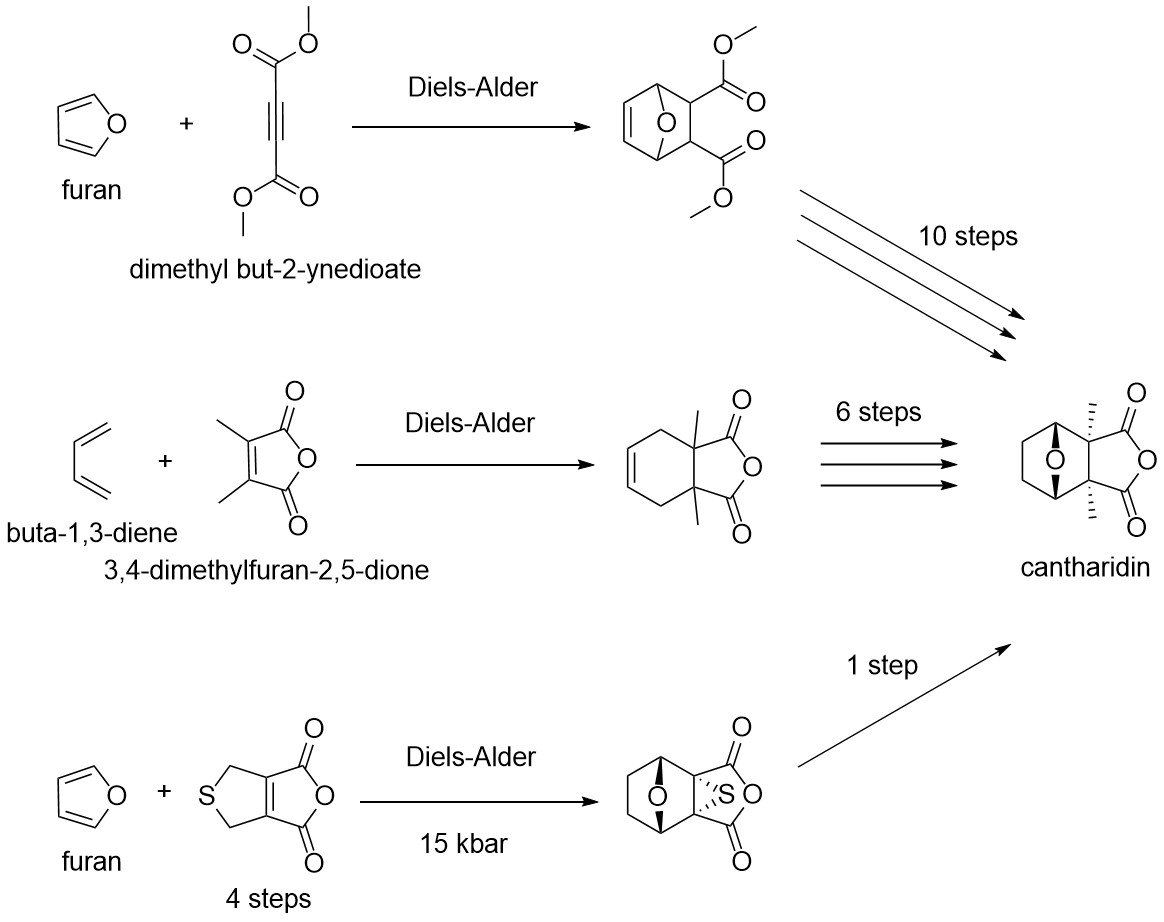
Most total syntheses of cantharidin start with a Diels-Alder reaction.

=== Biosynthesis ===
The complete mechanism of the biosynthesis of cantharidin is unknown. Its framework formally consists of two isoprene units. However, feeding studies indicate that the biosynthetic process is more complicated, and not a simple product of geranyl pyrophosphate or related ten-carbon parent structure, as the seeming monoterpene nature would suggest. Instead, there is a farnesol (15-carbon) precursor from which certain carbon segments are later excised.

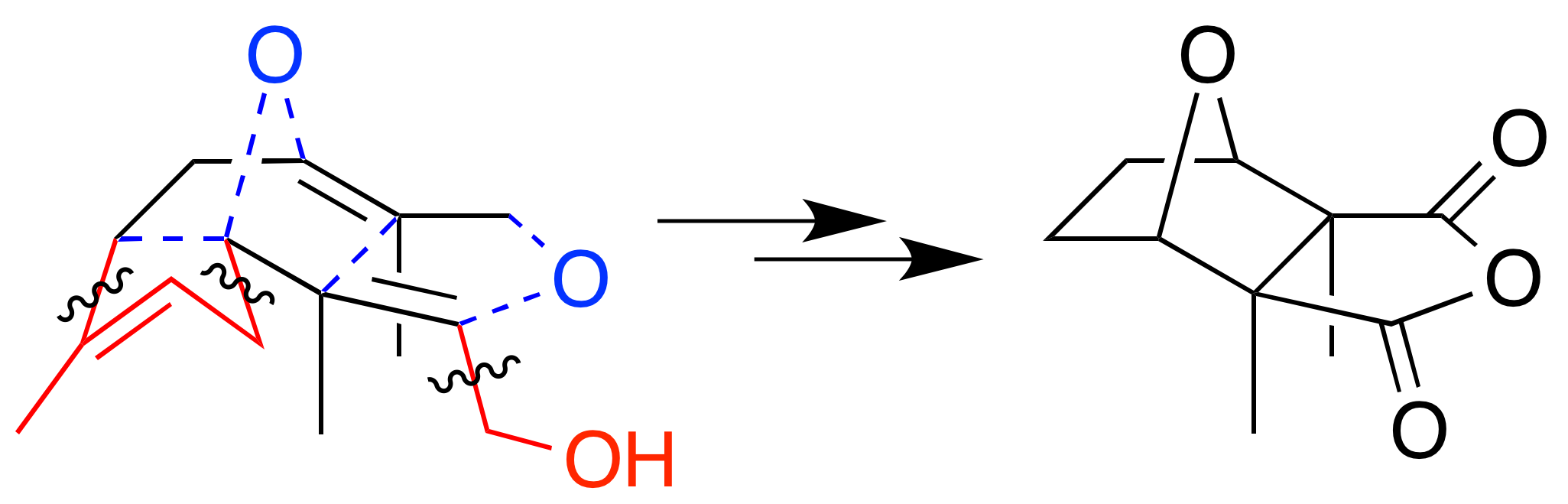
Biosynthesis from farnesol — bonds to be formed and major atoms to be added are in blue; while bonds to be broken and atoms/structural segments to be removed are in red.

Biosynthesis utilizing farnesol as a key intermediate is further supported by experiments in which key genes whose transcripts are expected to participate in the biosynthesis pathway were interfered with by RNA interference methods. The mevalonate pathway (MVA pathway) is responsible for producing isoprenoids in many organisms, including farnesol. Interference with two genes that participate in the MVA pathway, methyl farnesoate epoxidase (EcMFE) and juvenile hormone epoxide hydrolase (EcJHEH) inhibited the biosynthesis of cantharidin in male blister beetles.

== History ==
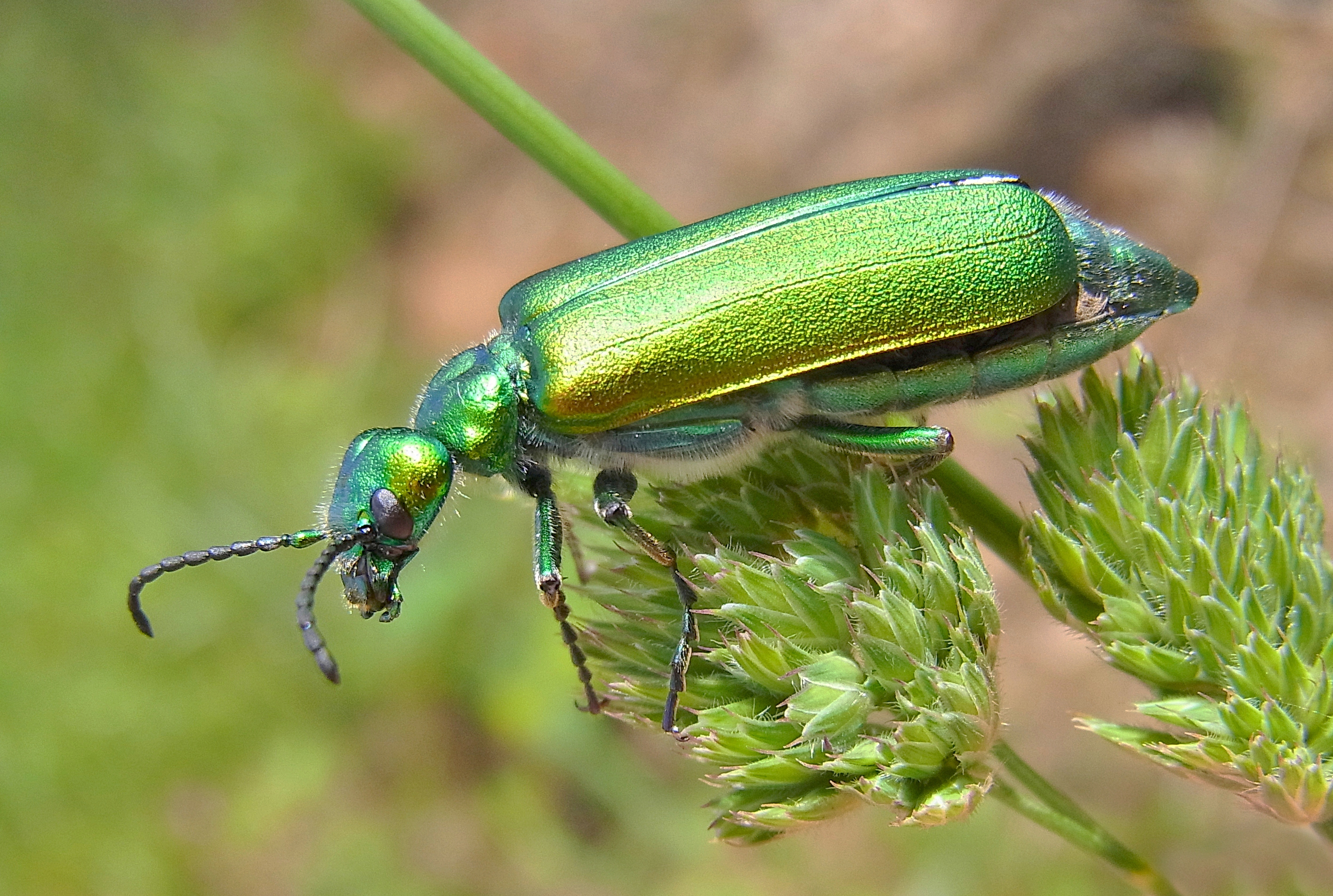
Spanish fly (Lytta vesicatoria), a beetle that secretes cantharidin

=== Aphrodisiac preparations ===
Preparations made from blister beetles (particularly "Spanish fly") have been used since ancient times as an aphrodisiac, possibly because their physical effects were perceived to mimic those of sexual arousal, and because they can cause prolonged erection or priapism in men. These preparations were known as cantharides, from the Greek word for "beetle".

Examples of such use found in historical sources include:

- The ancient Roman historian Tacitus relates that a cantharid preparation was used by the empress Livia, wife of Augustus Caesar, to entice members of the imperial family or dinner guests to commit sexual indiscretions (thus, providing her information to hold over them).
- The German emperor Henry IV (1050–1106) is said to have consumed cantharides.
- The French surgeon Ambroise Paré (1510–1590) described a case in 1572 of a man suffering from "the most frightful satyriasis" after taking a potion composed of nettles and a cantharid extract. This is perhaps the same man of whom Paré relates that a courtesan sprinkled a cantharid powder on food she served to him, after which the man experienced "violent priapism" and anal bleeding, of which he later died. Paré also cites the case of a priest who died of hematuria after swallowing a dose of cantharides, which he intended to fortify his sex drive.
- Cantharides were in widespread use among the upper classes in France in the 1600s, despite being a banned substance. Police searches in connection with a rash of poisonings around 1680 turned up many stashes of "bluish flies", which were known to be used in the preparation of aphrodisiac potions.
- The French sorceress Catherine Monvoisin (known as "La Voisin," c. 1640–1680) was recorded in the 1670s as having prepared a love charm made from Spanish fly mixed with dried mole's blood and bat's blood.
- Aphrodisiac sweets presumably laced with cantharides were circulated within libertine circles during the 1700s in France. They were multicolored tablets nicknamed "pastilles de Richelieu," after the Maréchal de Richelieu, a notorious libertine (not to be confused with his great-uncle, the Cardinal Richelieu) who procured sexual encounters for King Louis XV.
- The French writer Donatien Alphonse François — notoriously known as the Marquis de Sade (1740–1814) — is said to have given aniseed-flavored pastilles laced with Spanish fly to two prostitutes at a pair of orgies in 1772, poisoning and nearly killing them. He was sentenced to death for that (and for the crime of sodomy), but was later reprieved on appeal.

=== Non-aphrodisiac uses ===
- The Spanish clergyman Juan de Horozco y Covarrubias (es) (c. 1540–1610) reported the use of blister beetles as a poison as well as an aphrodisiac.
- Preparations of dried blister beetles were at one time used as a treatment for smallpox. As late as 1892, Andrew Taylor Still, the founder of osteopathy, recommended inhaling a tincture of cantharidin as an effective preventative and treatment for smallpox, decrying vaccination.
- Japanese ninja used blister beetles combined with arsenic to create a noxious gas.

=== Pharmaco-chemical isolation ===
Cantharidin was first isolated as a chemically pure substance in 1810 by Pierre Robiquet, a French chemist then living in Paris. Robiquet isolated cantharidin as the active ingredient in pharmacological preparations of Lytta vesicatoria (Spanish fly), a species of blister beetle. This was one of the first historical instances of the identification and extraction of a simple active principle from a complex medicine.

Robiquet found cantharidin to be an odorless and colorless solid at room temperature. He demonstrated that it was the active principle responsible for the aggressively blistering properties of the coating of the eggs of the blister beetle, and additionally established that cantharidin had toxic properties comparable in degree to those of the most virulent poisons known in the 19th century, such as strychnine.

=== Other uses of the pharmacological isolate ===
- Diluted solutions of cantharidin can be used as a topical medication to remove warts and tattoos, and to treat the small papules of molluscum contagiosum.
- In Santería rituals, cantharides are used in incense.

== Veterinary issues ==
Poisoning by Epicauta species from cantharidin is a significant veterinary concern, especially in horses; species infesting feedstocks depend on region—e.g., Epicauta pennsylvanica (black blister beetle) in the U.S. midwest; and E. occidentalis, temexia, and vittata species (striped blister beetles) in the U.S. southwest—where the concentrations of the agent in each can vary substantially. Beetles feed on weeds, and occasionally move into crop fields used to produce livestock feeds (e.g., alfalfa), where they are found to cluster and find their way into baled hay, e.g., a single flake (4–5 in. section) may have several hundred insects, or none at all. Horses are very sensitive to the cantharidin produced by beetle infestations: the LD_{50} for horses is roughly 1 mg/kg of the horse's body weight. Horses may be accidentally poisoned when fed bales of fodder with blister beetles in them.

Great bustards, a strongly polygynous bird species, are not immune to the toxicity of cantharidin; they become intoxicated after ingesting blister beetles. However, cantharidin has activity also against parasites that infect them. Great bustards may eat toxic blister beetles of the genus Meloe to increase the sexual arousal of males.

== Human medical issues ==
=== General risks ===
As a blister agent, cantharidin has the potential to cause adverse effects when used medically; for this reason, it has been included in a list of "problem drugs" used by dermatologists and emergency personnel. However, this references unregulated sources of cantharidin. In July 2023, the US FDA approved a topical formulation of cantharidin (Ycanth) for the treatment of molluscum contagiosum.

When ingested by humans, the LD_{50} is unknown, but fatal doses have been recorded between 10 mg and 65 mg. The median lethal dose appears to be around 1 mg/kg but individuals have survived after consuming oral doses as high as 175 mg. Ingesting cantharidin can initially cause severe damage to the lining of the gastrointestinal and urinary tracts, and may also cause permanent renal damage. Symptoms of cantharidin poisoning include hematuria, abdominal pain, and (rarely) priapism.

=== Risks of aphrodisiac use ===
The extreme toxicity of cantharidin makes any use as an aphrodisiac highly dangerous. As a result, it is illegal to sell (or use) cantharidin or preparations containing it without a prescription in many countries.

== Research ==
=== Mechanism of action ===
Topical cantharidin is absorbed by the lipid membranes of epidermal cells, causing the release of serine proteases, enzymes that break the peptide bonds in proteins. This causes the disintegration of desmosomal plaques, cellular structures involved in cell-to-cell adhesion, leading to detachment of the tonofilaments that hold cells together. The process leads to the loss of cellular connections (acantholysis), and ultimately results in blistering of the skin. Lesions heal without scarring.

=== Pharmaceutical use ===
VP-102, an experimental drug-device combination that includes cantharidin delivered via a single-use applicator, was studied for the treatment of molluscum contagiosum, common warts, and genital warts. The efficacy of cantharidin was formally established for the treatment of molluscum in patients 2 years and older in two double-blind, randomized, placebo-controlled trials. It is now FDA-approved for the treatment of molluscum contagiousum under the brand name Ycanth and is marketed by Verrica Pharmaceuticals.

=== Toxicity ===
The liver, primarily responsible for metabolism and detoxification, often becomes damaged in cases of cantharidin poisoning. The hepatotoxicity of cantharidin arises from its inhibition of hepatocyte proliferation pathways, the promotion of hepatocyte apoptosis or autophagy, and increased inflammation. Many studies have been conducted to elucidate the specific interactions cantharidin has in the liver, that lead to pathology. The poison has been found to inhibit PP1, PP2A (PP = protein phosphatase), TIL-4 (TIL = toll-like receptor), NF-KB (NF = nuclear factor), ERK, and DFF45. Cantharidin promotes TNF-α (TNF = tumor necrosis factor), FASL, ROS, caspase-4, caspase-6, caspase-8, caspase-9, caspase-12, protein kinase R-like ER kinase, inositol-requiring enzyme 1, ATF6 (transcription factor 6), ATF4, BID, BAK, BAX, cyto C, LC3-1, p150, Atg7, P13K III, eIF2α, and CHOP pathways. Cantharidin has a diverse range of targets in the liver that have been discovered empirically. However, the exact chemical mechanisms by which cantharidin interferes with these structures are unknown.

=== Bioactivities ===
Cantharidin appears to have some effect in the topical treatment of cutaneous leishmaniasis in animal models. In addition to topical medical applications, cantharidin and its analogs are of particular interest for oncological applications as they may have toxic activity against cancer cells. Laboratory studies with cultured tumor cells suggest that this activity may be the result of PP2A inhibition.

Recent research has identified many other pathways in cancer cells that may be interfered with by cantharidin. Generally, cantharidin's anticancer targets include numerous transcription factors, protein kinases, growth factors, and inflammatory cytokines. Cantharidin's general lack of target specificity in cancer cells and toxic effects towards healthy cells are limiting for clinical oncological applications.
