= Paula de Eguiluz =

17th-century African healer in the New World

Paula de Eguiluz (fl. 1636) was a healer of African descent on the island of Hispaniola. Well known as a health-care practitioner in one of the largest slave cities in the New World, she was tried for witchcraft three separate times. She has made an important impact on the understanding of 17th-century African healers and modern conceptions of love magic in the Caribbean.

== Early life ==
Paula was born on the island of Hispaniola, at the time referred to as Santo Domingo. Her mother, Guiomar Biáfara, was an enslaved woman owned by Diego de Leguizamón. Little is known about her from the Spanish Inquisition records of Cartagena, Colombia, other than that she was from "the Rivers of Guinea". Her father was a freedman named Cristóbal. Paula lived with her mother on Leguizamon's estate until the age of thirteen, when she was sold to Juan Nieto Criollo.

Criollo later sold her to a sugar planter named Íñigo de Otaza, and Paula was sent to serve him in Puerto Rico. After four years, she was sent to Havana on account of Otazo's wife, with some sources indicating jealousy as the reason. In Havana, Paula was sold to Joan de Eguiluz, who at the time served as the mayor of the copper mines near the city of Santiago. She would spend the rest of her young adulthood in Cuba as de Eguiluz's slave and lover. De Eguiluz eventually freed Paula, providing her with material wealth and his last name, but neither could protect her from accusations of "sorcery and dealings with the devil".

== Inquisition trials ==
=== First trial: 1624 ===
Reported by her Cuban neighbors, Paula de Eguiluz was brought to the Inquisition in Cartagena for the first time in 1624, on suspicion of witchcraft. The charges against her included killing a newborn by sucking on its navel, jumping out of a window to avoid a blow from her master but suffering no injuries, practicing love magic, and having a pact with the devil as a member of a witches' gathering. De Eguiluz initially brushed off the accusations as resulting from the jealousy towards her master's love and her material accessories. She flaunted her extensive wardrobe, which the Cuban Holy Office functionaries inventoried as including nine skirts, seven bodices, six shirts, and four headscarves. All of her clothing was new and expensive, far beyond expectations for an enslaved woman. She owned (and presumably wore, despite the tropical climate) heavy wool skirts lavishly dyed in blue, scarlet, dark green, and dark gold. She also had damask skirts, dyed blue or yellow, and decorated in silver. Her bodices were equally luxurious, in bright combinations including blue with gold braid, green and scarlet with silver buttons, and white and yellow with silver braid.

After three months and thirteen hearings, de Eguiluz understood what the Inquisitors wanted to hear as her testimony: the story of the Witches' Sabbath. They would not settle for any explanation unless it included a confession of witchcraft. De Eguiluz complied and spoke of her pact with the devil. There has been extensive scholarly debate around the validity of the charges filed against de Eguiluz, with academics such as Kathryn Joy McKnight believing de Eguiluz chose to comply with the Inquisition's story. "Paula de Eguiluz portrayed herself alternately as a woman deceived by the devil, a skillful healer, a repentant sinner, and a faithful Christian in contrast to the morally lax members of Cartagena elite society who sought adulterous pleasures and who sinned so much that they could not earn indulgences." She was convicted of witchcraft and sentenced to 200 public lashes of the whip and two years in a hospital, wearing a sambenito. De Eguiluz stayed in Cartagena after her trial and remained free until her second trial, in 1632.

=== Second trial: 1632 ===
The second time de Eguiluz was arrested was in 1632. There was suspicion that she had returned to witchcraft and made another pact with the devil. In the eight years between her first and second periods of imprisonment, she began earning an income as a healer and washerwoman, as well as taking part in love affairs and socializing with other Afro-Caribbean women who dealt in love magic, powders, remedies, and possibly even witchcraft and occult-influenced sexuality. As was traditional in Cartagena and other cities in the Iberian Peninsula and Spanish America, women of various social classes and nationalities gathered to support each other's efforts in relationships with men, and to buy, sell, and trade potions and spells meant to help attract and keep men's interest and patronage. De Eguiluz, her peers, and her clients regularly spoke of their magical practices as attempts to achieve "good love", whereas the Inquisitors described the relationships the women craved as "dishonest friendships". Most of the experts in love magic in Cartagena were African-descended freedwomen and slaves, working in domestic servitude or in menial jobs. These women practiced divination in an effort to learn about potential lovers who could give them gifts or alleviate their financial worries. Motivated by emotional cravings and sexual desires as well as financial expediency, they cast binding spells and tied knots to keep these men with them. Invocations calling on souls in purgatory and hell demanded that the men feel pain in their most sensitive and vital organs if they left the women. They also discussed "stupefying" men to make them more compliant. De Eguiluz taught her comrades incantations that could reignite the "flames of love" in a disaffected lover. She also reputedly knew how to make potions that would "get rid of a man's love" when he was no longer wanted.

Her second trial consisted of 21 hearings, where she developed a script of what the Inquisitors wanted to hear. By this time, however, she had made friends and connections within her local area, and she used them to try and reduce her sentence. She also provided the Inquisitors with a list of names of people suspected of witchcraft, which led to the arrest of 21 women. In her testimony, de Eguiluz mentioned her experience with herbs, recipes, and healing, stressing the fact that her intention was to heal, not harm. De Eguiluz remained confined in prison for the next two years, between her second and third trials.

=== Third trial: 1634 ===
In 1634, a prosecutor decided to review de Eguiluz's previous trial. For this series of hearings, a local competitor in the market of healing potions named Diego López became her bitter rival. López had been investigated due to de Eguiluz's numerous confessions during her second trial, leading to his arrest and interrogation. Some of the women whom she had named were also angry and wanted to testify against her. Five of them claimed they had confessed to witchcraft because de Eguiluz had convinced them to. López accused de Eguiluz of a number of severe crimes under his interrogation, including poisoning a treasury official, negligence leading to the death of a young girl, and introducing a large number of people into the practice of witchcraft.

De Eguiluz did not talk as much during this trial, fearing that, due to its seriousness, it could lead to her execution. She emphasized her work as a healer, calling herself a curandera. However, when inquisitors read de Eguiluz a summary of López's accusations, de Eguiluz was furious and denied the charges brought against her. When given the opportunity to respond, she reportedly stated, "I say that I know nothing about this because this witness is my enemy Diego López. I take him as a man with a bad conscience and I challenge his statements". De Eguiluz would be found guilty, facing another unspecified stay in prison and two hundred lashes. During this time, López would continue his efforts to denounce de Eguiluz's character. After multiple instances of threatening fellow inmates, inquisitors moved López to another cell, where he would have less communication with the women. Now isolated, he would go on to retract all 147 of his accusations and confessions, including those made against de Eguiluz. He was subsequently tortured by the Cartagena inquisitors.

== Life after the trials ==
After de Eguiluz's final trial in 1634, she largely remains undocumented. She would spend the next few years in her Cartagena prison cell, conversing with the friends she made during the second and third trials. She became a de facto prison leader as a result of her status, and she was able to temporarily escape her prison confines in exchange for bribes or sexual favors for the guards. After her Auto-da-fé, de Eguiluz remained in prison but "enjoyed furlough to travel in a sedan chair, luxuriously dressed and well paid, to advise bishops and inquisitors on their medical care". No information exists regarding her life after prison.
