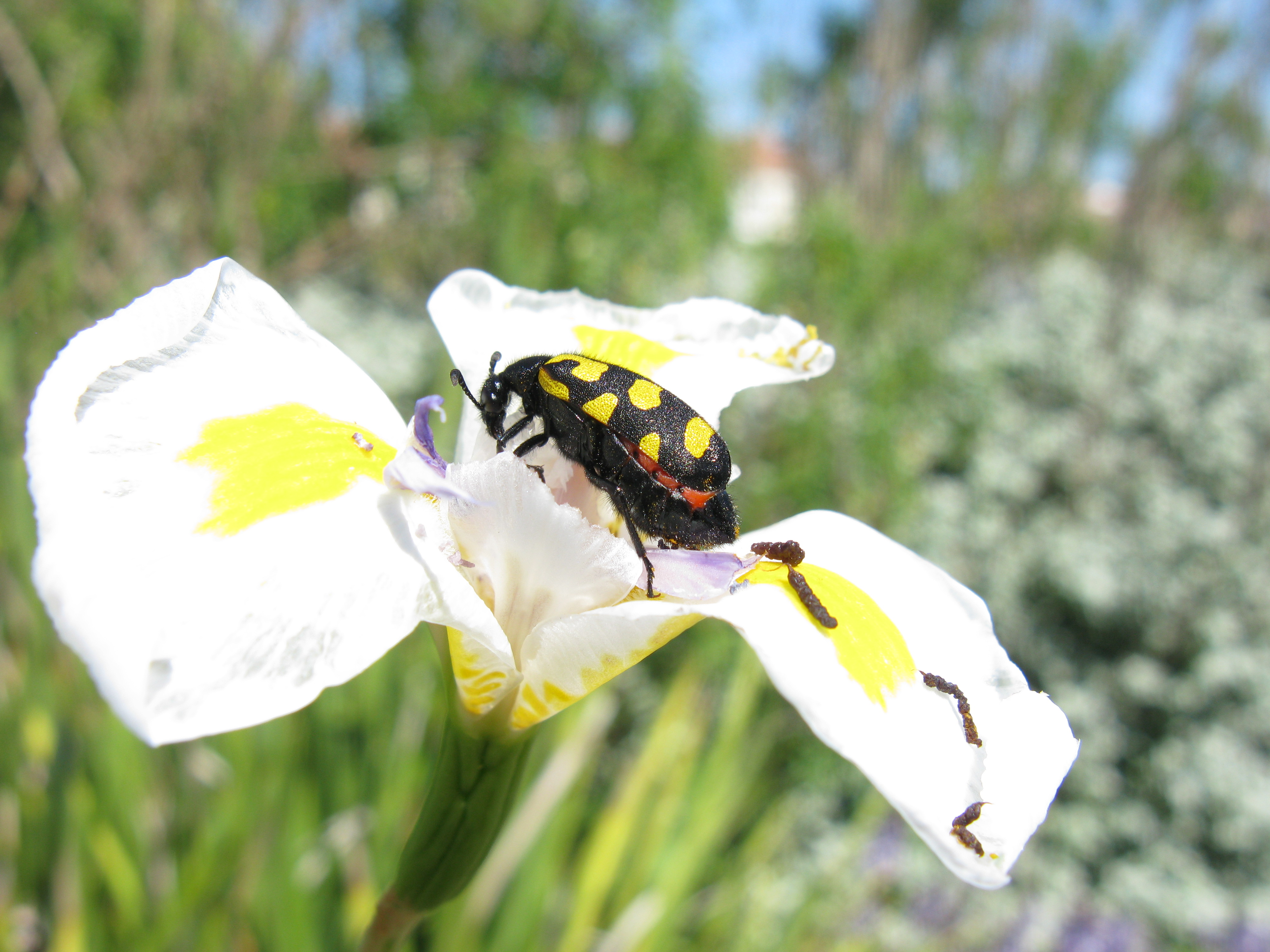
- Ceroctis capensis

Scientific classification
- Domain: Eukaryota
- Kingdom: Animalia
- Phylum: Arthropoda
- Class: Insecta
- Order: Coleoptera
- Suborder: Polyphaga
- Infraorder: Cucujiformia
- Family: Meloidae
- Genus: Ceroctis de Marseul, 1870

= Ceroctis =

Genus of beetles

Ceroctis is a genus of beetles belonging to the family Meloidae.

The species of this genus are found in Europe and Africa.

Species:

- Ceroctis angolensis Gemminger & Harold, 1870
- Ceroctis aurantiaca Fairmaire, 1885
- Ceroctis capensis Linne, 1767
- Ceroctis gyllenhalli Billberg, 1813
- Ceroctis interna Harold, 1879
- Ceroctis korana Peringuey, 1886
- Ceroctis subtrinotata Pic, 1915
