= Ras el hanout =

North African spice mix

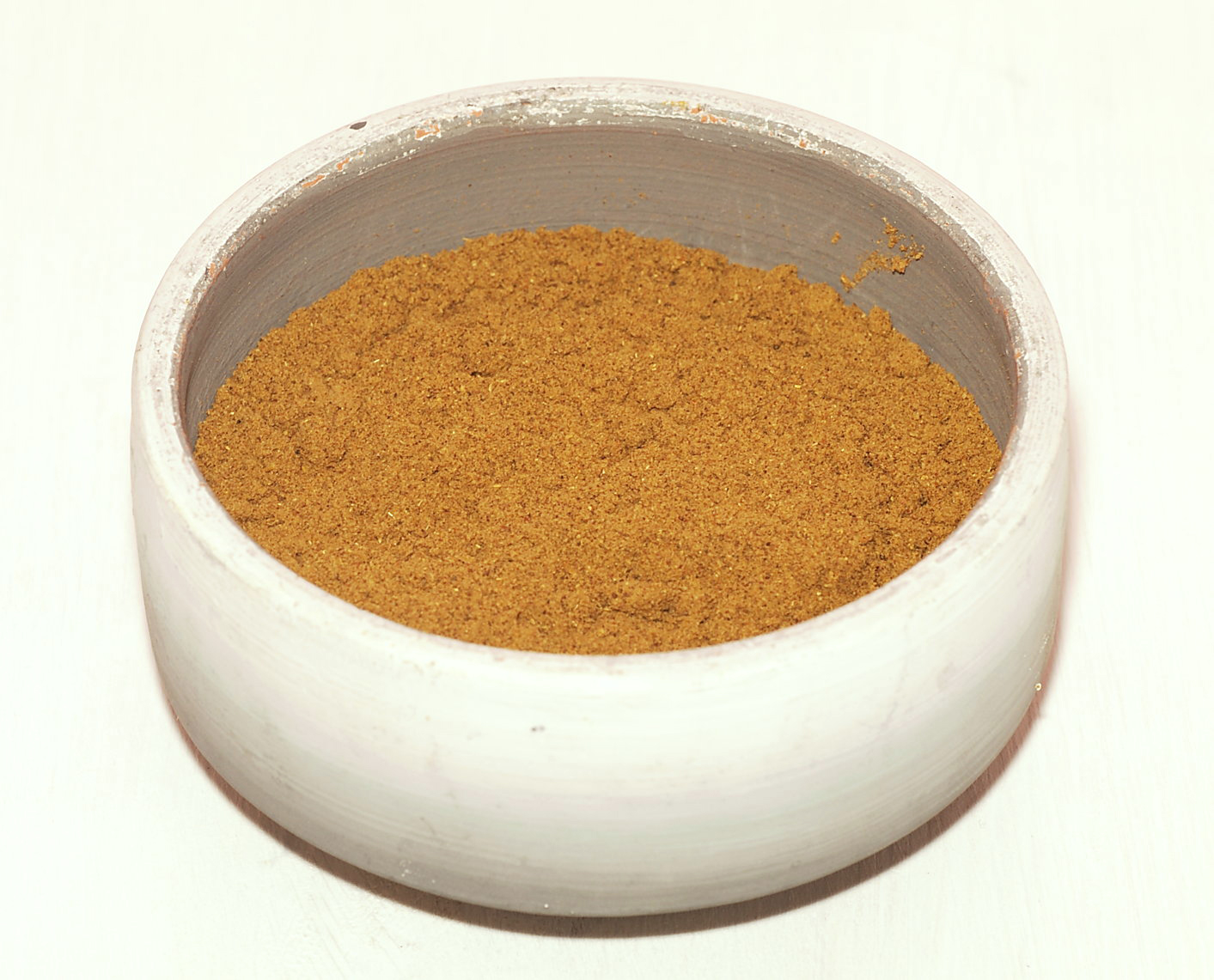
Ras el hanout in a bowl

Ras el hanout or rass el hanout (Arabic: رأس الحانوت raʾs al-ḥānūt, Arabic pronunciation: [rɑʔs ælħɑːnuːt]) is a spice mix found in varying forms in Tunisia, Algeria, and Morocco. The name means 'head of the shop' in Arabic and implies a mixture of the best spices the seller has to offer. Ras el hanout is used in many savoury dishes, sometimes rubbed on meat or fish, or stirred into couscous or rice.

No definitive composition of spices makes up ras el hanout. Each shop, company, or family may have their own blend. The mixture usually consists of over a dozen spices in different proportions. Common ingredients include cardamom, cumin, clove, cinnamon, nutmeg, mace, allspice, dry ginger, chili peppers, coriander seed, peppercorn, sweet and hot paprika, fenugreek, and dry turmeric. Some spices may be particular to the region, such as mountain ash berries, chufa, grains of paradise, orris root, monk's pepper, cubebs, dried rosebud, fennel seed or aniseed, galangal, and long pepper. Ingredients may be toasted before being ground or pounded in a mortar and mixed. Some preparations include salt or sugar, but that is generally not the accepted practice. Garlic, saffron, nuts and dry herbs are generally not included, as they are usually added to dishes individually, but some commercial preparations, particularly in Europe and North America, may contain them.

Certain supposed aphrodisiacs, including the notoriously dangerous "green metallic beetles", cantharides, have appeared in many Moroccan ras el hanout formulations, but these seem to be irrelevant for flavouring purposes.
