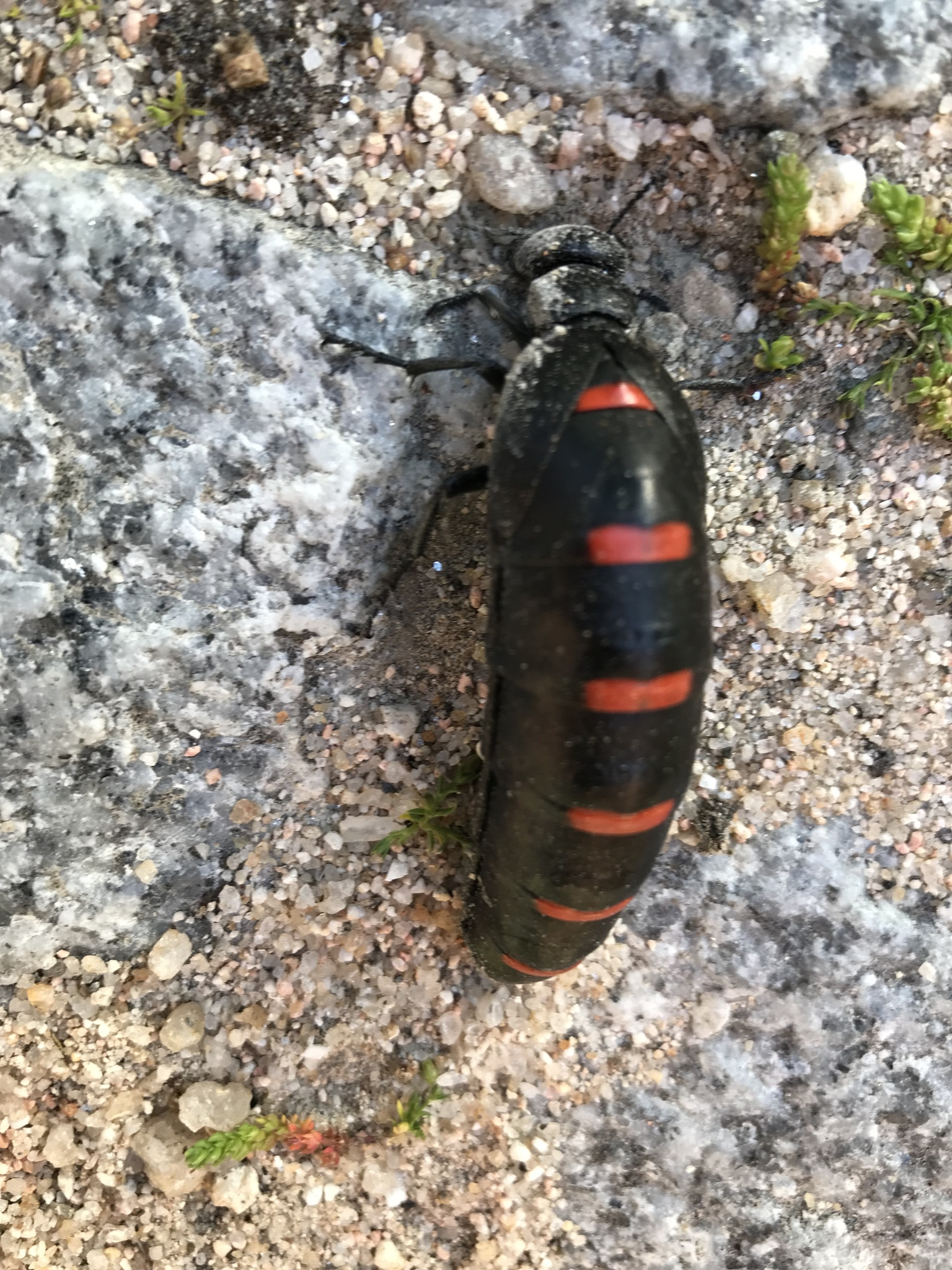

Scientific classification
- Kingdom: Animalia
- Phylum: Arthropoda
- Clade: Pancrustacea
- Class: Insecta
- Order: Coleoptera
- Suborder: Polyphaga
- Infraorder: Cucujiformia
- Family: Meloidae
- Genus: Berberomeloe
- Species: B. castuo

Binomial name
- Berberomeloe castuo Sánchez-Vialas, García-París, Ruiz & Recuero (2020)

= Berberomeloe castuo =

Species of beetle

Berberomeloe castuo, known commonly as the Portuguese red-striped oil beetle, is a species of beetle in the genus of Berberomeloe.

== Description ==
Berberomeloe, a genus within the tribe Lyttini of the family Meloidae (also known as oil or blister beetles), comprises the species Berberomeloe castuo formerly identified as Berberomeloe majalis. These beetles are wingless and parasitize solitary bees during their larval stage and are pollinators as adults. Their most distinctive feature is their bulky abdomens. Individuals from populations found in the southwestern region of the Iberian Peninsula (which includes southern Portugal and southwestern Spain) exhibit a uniform black coloration. In contrast, specimens from populations situated north of the Sistema Central mountain range, encompassing northern Portugal and the Spanish provinces of Ourense, León, and Zamora, typically display wider abdominal transverse bars than those in the southern and central populations. Specimens of this species can exhibit distinctive abdominal transverse bars. In the majority of populations within the Extremadura region, these bars appear yellow to orange. However, in areas extending northward to the Sistema Central mountain range, the coloration shifts to a deep red hue.

== Range ==
This particular species inhabits the entire western region of the Iberian Peninsula, encompassing both Portugal and the westernmost parts of Spain, stretching from Ourense to Huelva.

== Etymology ==
The epithet for this species originates from the Spanish term "castúo", which specifically alludes to the residents and language of Extremadura, the region where the species was first identified. In grammatical terms, it functions as a noun in apposition.
