= Jacqueline Felice de Almania =

Italian physician

Jacqueline Felice de Almania (Italian: Jacobina Felice· Latin: Jacoba Felicie), (fl. 1322) was reportedly from Florence, Italy. She was an early 14th-century French physician in Paris, France who was placed on trial in 1322 for unlawful practice.

== Career ==
Jacqueline was born into a prominent French Jewish family. Referring to herself as nobilis mulier domino Jacoba, indicating that she was of a high social class, Jacqueline Felice de Almania was known as a health specialist, treating both men and women for medical conditions. She had a reputation for having successful outcomes of her treatments. It was reported that individuals were directed to her if their previous treatment for fever, paralysis, or other medical conditions had failed. Individuals also went to her for medical attention when licensed physicians did not treat their conditions. She believed in the concept of "women's secrets"- the idea that a woman should look at other women's private parts, breasts, belly etc., as a barrier to keep men from knowing about "women's business".

Jacqueline Felice did not receive training at a University, possibly due to antisemitic and sexist restrictions for University enrollments at the time. Her lack of formal training caused physicians to feel offended because she used techniques as licensed physicians did, such as visiting the ill, examining urine by its physical appearance, touching the body, and prescribing potions, digestions, and laxatives. Her medical practice had a policy of not charging a fee unless there was a cure following the treatment.

== Medical licensing ==
Between the twelfth and sixteenth centuries, a period in which Jacqueline practiced, the regulation of medicine was growing significantly. Secular and religious authorities began to implement medical licensing systems, and practitioners were forming guilds that sought to control who could practice medicine and under what conditions. In 1271, the medical faculty of the University of Paris invoked a statute making it illegal to practice medicine without a church sanctioned license. This license was only obtained by completing courses provided by the university; these courses were typically unavailable to women and Jewish people. Much of the coursework that was provided by the university focused on theory and philosophy rather than practical medical skills.

Based on its original text, the statute that Jacqueline was accused of violating did not explicitly restrict women more than men from medical practice. Scholars noted that the prosecution of unlicensed practitioners was not solely focused on women; the Faculty of Medicine in Paris was directly targeting practitioners who were not university trained. Jacqueline was considered a threat to other physicians due to her methods being quite similar to licensed physicians and she lacked university education. The medical faculty sought out to restrict access to certain medications by those without university training to ensure regulation of medical practice more generally.

== Trial ==
In 1322, Jacobina Félicie was put on trial for unlawful practice. She was placed on trial against the Medical Faculty of Paris solely for the reason that she practised medicine without a medical license. In her defence, Jacobina believed that it was improper for men to palpate the breasts and abdomens of women. During the trial, there were eight witnesses, all of whom were her patients except one, who testified to her medical skills. According to one witness, she was reputed to be a better physician and surgeon than any of the French physicians in Paris. By being a better physician and surgeon as well as not charging patients if her treatments were unsuccessful, she seemed to anger male physicians.

=== Witness testimonies ===
The formal charges against Jacqueline described how she visited sick patients, took their urine and pulse, conducted examinations of their bodies, and created agreements to cure them. She also prescribed many medicinal preparations including syrups and pain relievers. Nearly all eight witnesses who testified had stated that they originally went to the city's licensed physicians for help, but they declared that they were unrecoverable. Jacqueline's defense stated that she successfully treated many patients that licensed physicians were unable to help, and if she was unable to cure them she would not charge for the service.

There were many specific testimonies from the trial. Jean of St. Omer, a Parisian shopkeeper, stated that Jacqueline visited him on a multitude of occasions and surpassed the city's doctors in treating his conditions, and he only paid her after a full recovery. Father Odo of Comery, a brother from a poorhouse in Paris, testified that she was much more skilled in surgery and medicine compared to the other licensed physicians he had visited. Other witnesses treated by Jacqueline described how multiple doctors failed to treat their conditions or had given up entirely. The only unfavorable testimony came from Clementine of Belues, who had testified that the prescribed remedy was quite unpleasant. Her husband and other doctors discouraged her from taking the potion.

There is also documentation of specific treatments that demonstrated Jacqueline tailored her remedies to individual conditions: herbal vapor baths for rheumatism, a variety of potions for kidney ailments, clear liquids for fevers, and some ointments for other complaints. Many of these methods were also utilized by licensed practitioners throughout the period.

=== Defense arguments ===
Jacqueline advanced several arguments in her defense. She stated that the law that was being used against her was originally intended to prevent unqualified and ignorant individuals from practicing medicine. She contended that this law should not apply to someone with her level of medicinal skill and experience. She also argued on behalf of patient modesty, asserting that it was more appropriate for a knowledgeable woman practitioners to examine and treat other women. Historically, many female patients were reluctant to disclose personal ailments to male physicians out of shame. The court rejected Jacqueline's statements as without merit, declining to engage with arguments about the morality in treatment of female patients.

=== Verdict and consequences ===
At the end of the trial, Jacqueline Felice de Almania was found guilty and was threatened with excommunication if she was ever caught practising medicine again. She was also banned from practising medicine, although it is unknown if she continued to be a medical healer after the trial, and she was handed a fine of 60 Parisian pounds. The prosecution's case was based upon the absence of formal training at a university, but no effort was made to test her knowledge of medicine. Despite the testimonies that she was able to cure people the male physicians had given up on, the court reasoned that it was obvious that a man could understand the subject of medicine better than a woman because of his gender. This decision is considered to have banned women from academic study in medicine in France and obtaining licenses until the 19th century.

The medical faculty did not contest the evidence of Jacqueline's successful treatments. Instead, they stated that due to her not having formal university instruction she could not fully understand the underlying causes of disease. Therefore, they argued that she risked harming her patients through the use of potions and her other remedies. The position the faculty relied on reflected a broader university-trained viewpoint that medicine was a science that required learning from books; practical experience was considered insufficient without a foundation in scholarly texts. Jacqueline was one of many unlicensed practitioners that were penalized at this time. There were at least five other physicians that were also fined and excommunicated at similar trials.

The verdict from Jacqueline's trial reinforced the institutional barriers that kept women exempt from obtaining formal medicine licensure in France for the following centuries.

== Notes ==
- Jacobina Félicie's story is the fullest, documented account of the actual hands-on practices of an historical, female medical practitioner.
