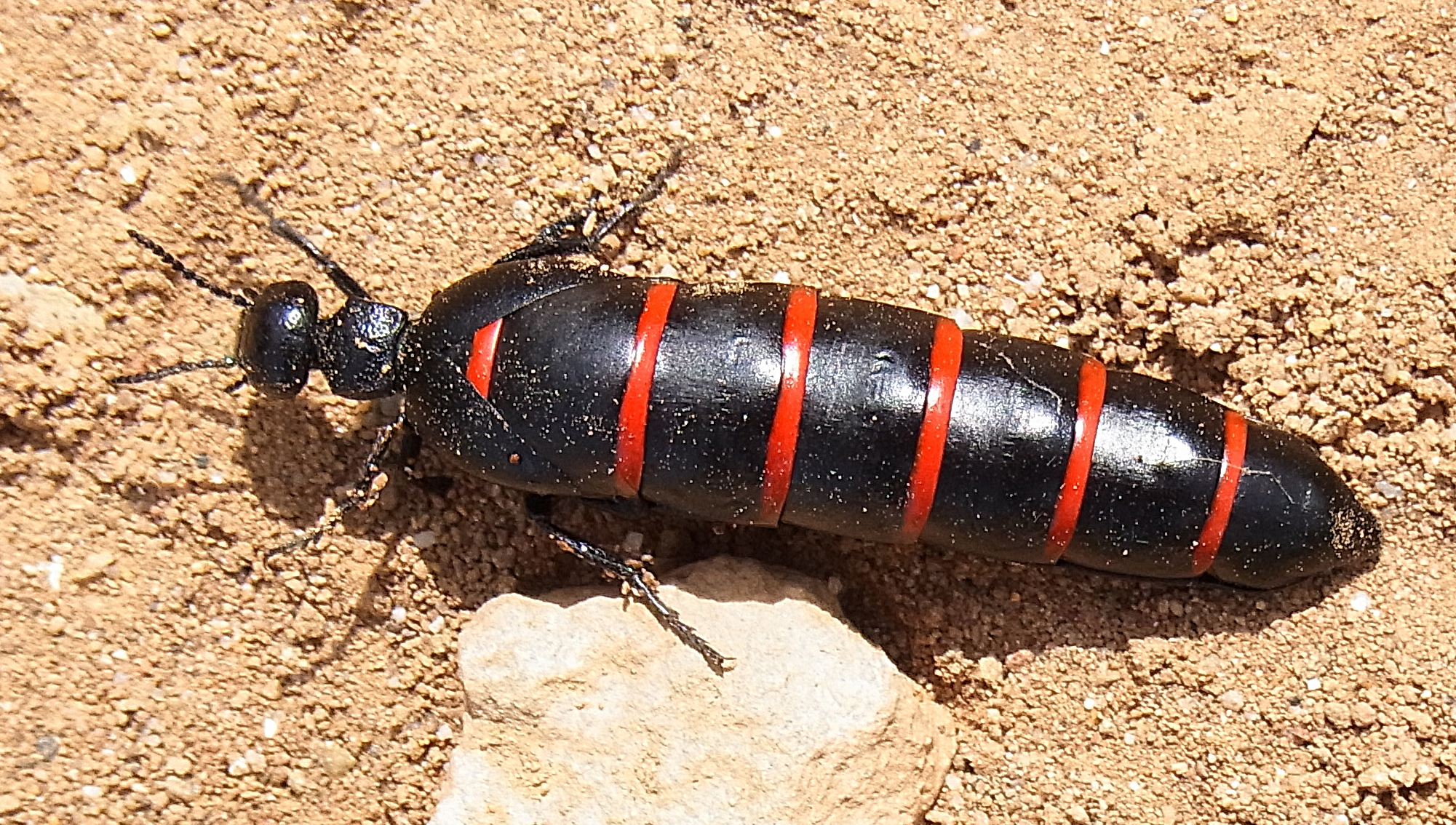
- The red-striped oil beetle, Berberomeloe majalis

Scientific classification
- Domain: Eukaryota
- Kingdom: Animalia
- Phylum: Arthropoda
- Class: Insecta
- Order: Coleoptera
- Suborder: Polyphaga
- Infraorder: Cucujiformia
- Family: Meloidae
- Tribe: Lyttini
- Genus: Berberomeloe; M. A. Bologna, 1989

Species
- Berberomeloe castuo Berberomeloe insignis Berberomeloe majalis

= Berberomeloe =

Genus of beetles

Berberomeloe is a genus within the tribe Lyttini of the family Meloidae, the oil or blister beetles. It includes two species, the red-striped oil beetle, Berberomeloe majalis, and the less flamboyant Berberomeloe insignis.

== Taxonomy ==
Until recently these species were included in the genus Meloe, which is treated in the tribe Meloini; the placement of what was previously called Meloe majalis instead in a genus within the tribe Lyttini was proposed by Bologna (1988) and has commanded general acceptance. As Bologna notes, it had long been known that the larval development of the red-stripted oil beetle was very different from that of most species placed in Meloe, so that some authors treated it within the Lyttini genus Trichomeloe. However the species does not fit into any other genus of Lyttini, having a unique combination of autapomorphic characters, namely reduced elytra, no wings and modified antennae, so Bologna proposed the new genus. Bologna envisaged that other species currently placed in Meloe might be found to be anomalous once their larval development was studied in full. However, the addition of a second species to Berbermeloe came by a different route: García-Paris (1998). revived the name insignis, which had been thought to be merely a synonym for majalis, to describe a rare, distinct population endemic to the Spanish provinces of Granada, Almería and Murcia. Individuals of this type differed from typical B. majalis in several anatomical characteristics, and hence García-Paris argued that they should be given species status and should also be placed in Berberomeloe.

== Distribution ==
The genus Berberomeloe is endemic to the Western Mediterranean, specifically the Iberian Peninsula, France, Algeria, Morocco and Tunisia.

== Description ==
The coloration in the species Berberomeloe majalis (Linnaeus, 1758) is characterized by the presence of bright blood-red or orange transverse stripes across a solid black swollen abdomen (the length of this beetle may reach up to 9 centimetres (3.5 in)). However, B. majalis varies extensively in colour. Populations of entirely black specimens without any red markings are found scattered over much of the distribution range of B. majalis. These populations are often found close to populations consisting of red-striped specimens, but both morphs seem to be spatially segregated and no mixed series have been found in the field. Entirely black and red-striped specimens of Berberomeloes majalis are equally poisonous.
