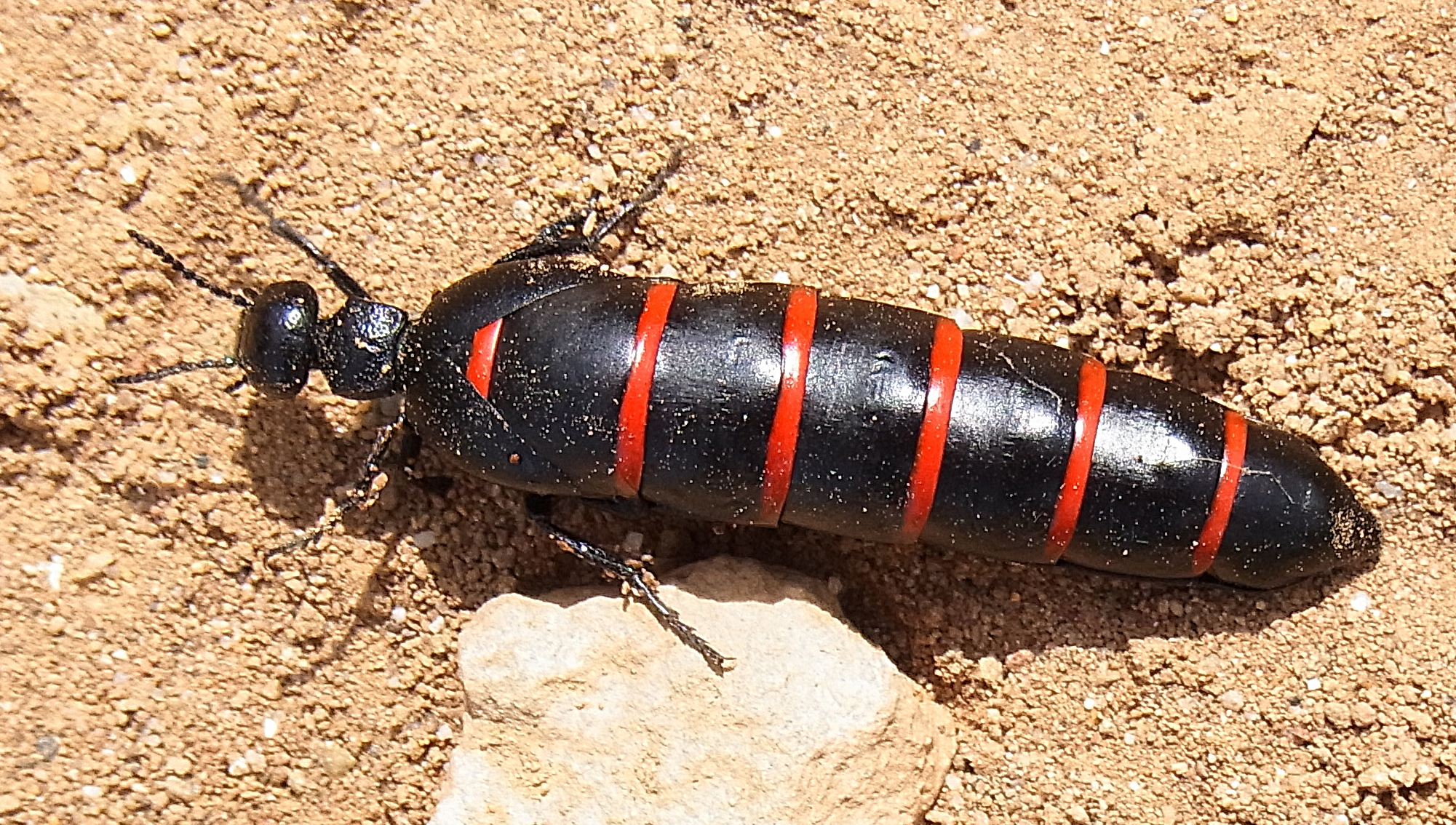
- The red-striped oil beetle, Berberomeloe majalis

Scientific classification
- Kingdom: Animalia
- Phylum: Arthropoda
- Class: Insecta
- Order: Coleoptera
- Suborder: Polyphaga
- Infraorder: Cucujiformia
- Family: Meloidae
- Genus: Berberomeloe
- Species: B. majalis

Binomial name
- Berberomeloe majalis (Linnaeus, 1758)

Synonyms
- Meloe majalis

= Berberomeloe majalis =

Red-striped oil beetle

Species of beetle

Berberomeloe majalis, the red-striped oil beetle, is an insect in the genus Berberomeloe, in the family of Blister Beetles. It is native to the western Mediterranean Basin.

== Description ==
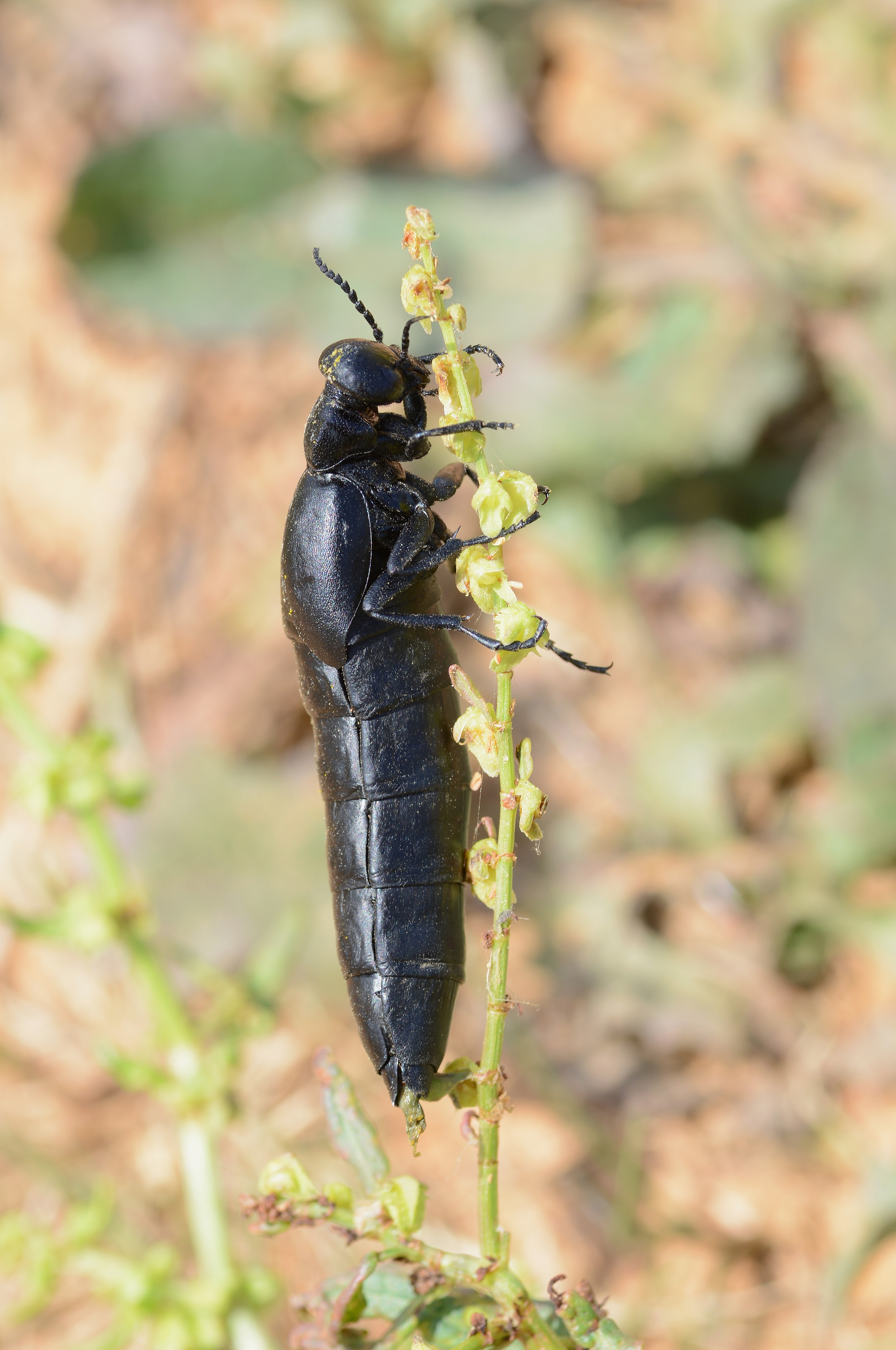
All black specimen of Berberomeloe majalis, Portugal

It has a typical length around 5 cm (2 in.). Its large size and the bright red bands around its body make it unmistakable; its coloration is aposematic, reflecting its ability, in common with other oil or blister beetles in the family Meloidae, to squirt a caustic liquid if attacked. In Spain however this beetle varies extensively in color. Populations of entirely black specimens without any red markings are found scattered over much of the distribution range of B. majalis. These populations are often found close to populations consisting of red-striped specimens, but both morphs seem to be spatially segregated and no mixed series have been found in the field. Entirely black and red-striped specimens of Berberomeloe majalis are equally poisonous.

== Distribution and habitat ==
The red-striped oil beetle is found in dry places in Portugal and the Mediterranean regions of Spain and North Africa, from Morocco to Tunisia. They live in sunny, dry places, either in open grassland in woodland with light tree cover. They can be found from sea level to altitudes as high as 3000 m in the Sierra Nevada.

== Ecology ==
The imago lives on pollen. The larvae are exclusively parasitic, mainly living in the nests of solitary wild bees. The female lays between 2000 and 10000 eggs, but most of these fail to reach maturity either for lack of food or through predation. In contrast with the adult, the larvae are only about 3 mm long, and their development proceeds through hypermetamorphosis. The various larval stages are therefore of different forms. Unlike the larvae of beetles of the genus Meloe, the first stage larva does not cling on to a potential host, but has to actively seek a host out. Once the larva has consumed the egg and stored nectar and pollen from a bee's nest, they leave it. They then moult again, and emerge with their back legs formed. From this stage they pupate, and emerge from the chrysalis as adults. If a larva accidentally selects a honey bee as host, it dies in the hive.
