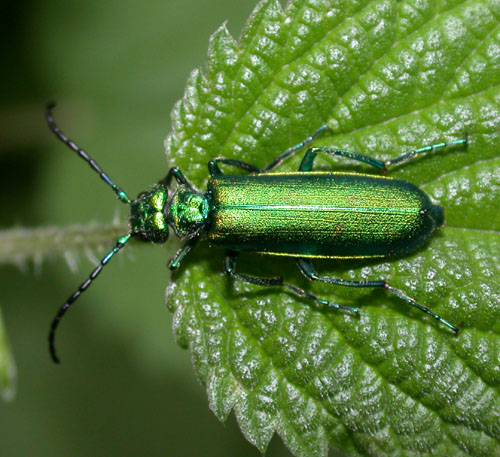

Scientific classification
- Kingdom: Animalia
- Phylum: Arthropoda
- Clade: Pancrustacea
- Class: Insecta
- Order: Coleoptera
- Suborder: Polyphaga
- Infraorder: Cucujiformia
- Family: Meloidae
- Genus: Lytta
- Species: L. vesicatoria

Binomial name
- Lytta vesicatoria (Linnaeus, 1758)

= Lytta vesicatoria =

Species of beetle that produces a toxic blistering agent

Lytta vesicatoria, also known as the Spanish fly, is an aposematic emerald-green beetle in the blister beetle family (Meloidae). It is distributed across Eurasia.

The species and others in its family were used in traditional apothecary preparations as "Cantharides". The insect is the source of the terpenoid cantharidin, a toxic blistering agent once used as an exfoliating agent, anti-rheumatic drug and an aphrodisiac. The substance has also found culinary use in some blends of the North African spice mix ras el hanout. Its various supposed benefits have been responsible for accidental poisonings.

== Etymology and taxonomy ==
The generic name is from the Greek λύττα (lytta), meaning martial rage, raging madness, Bacchic frenzy, or rabies. The specific name is derived from Latin vesica, bladder.

Lytta vesicatoria was formerly named Cantharis vesicatoria, although the genus Cantharis is in an unrelated family, Cantharidae, the soldier beetles. It was classified there erroneously until the Danish zoologist Johan Christian Fabricius corrected its name in his Systema entomologiae in 1775. He reclassified the Spanish fly as the type species of the new genus Lytta, in the family Meloidae.

Before binominal nomenclature of Linnaeus, L. vesicatoria was called musca hispanica ("spanish fly" in latin).

== Description and ecology ==
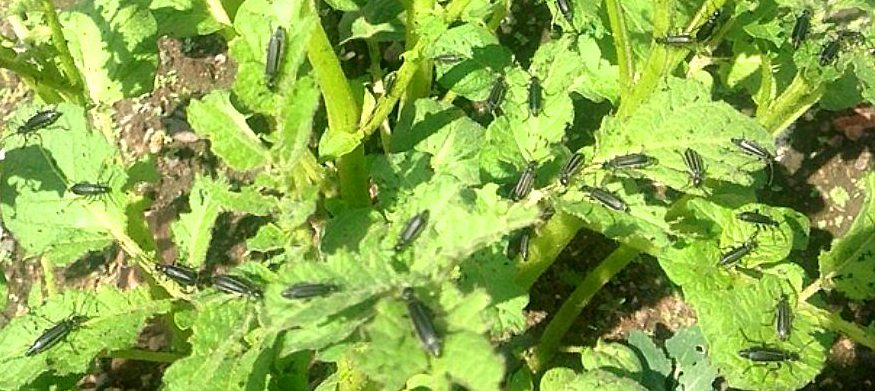
An aggregation of Spanish fly adults in Siberia. The behaviour and their toxicity suggest that their conspicuous coloration is aposematic.

The adult Spanish fly is a slender, soft-bodied metallic and iridescent golden-green insect, one of the blister beetles. It is approximately 5 mm (0.2 in) wide by 20 mm (0.8 in) long.

The female lays her fertilised eggs on the ground, near the nest of a ground-nesting solitary bee. The larvae are very active as soon as they hatch. They climb a flowering plant and await the arrival of a solitary bee. They hook themselves on to the bee using the three claws on their legs that give the first instar larvae their name, triungulins (from Latin tri, three, and ungulus, claw). The bee carries the larvae back to its nest, where they feed on bee larvae and the bees' food supplies. The larvae are thus somewhere between predators and parasites. The active larvae moult into very different, more typically scarabaeoid larvae for the remaining two or more instars, in a development type called hypermetamorphosis. The adults emerge from the bees' nest and fly to the woody plants on which they feed.

The defensive chemical cantharidin, for which the beetle is known, is synthesised only by males; females obtain it from males during mating, as the spermatophore contains some. This may be a nuptial gift, increasing the value of mating to the female, and thus increasing the male's reproductive fitness. Zoologists note that the conspicuous coloration, the presence of a powerful toxin, and the adults' aggregating behaviour in full view of any predators strongly suggest aposematism among the blistering meloid beetles.

== Range and habitat ==
The Spanish fly is found across Eurasia, though it is a mainly a southern European species, with some records from southern Great Britain and Poland. Adult beetles primarily feed on leaves of ash, lilac, amur privet, honeysuckle and white willow. It is occasionally found on plum, rose, and elm.

== Interaction with humans ==
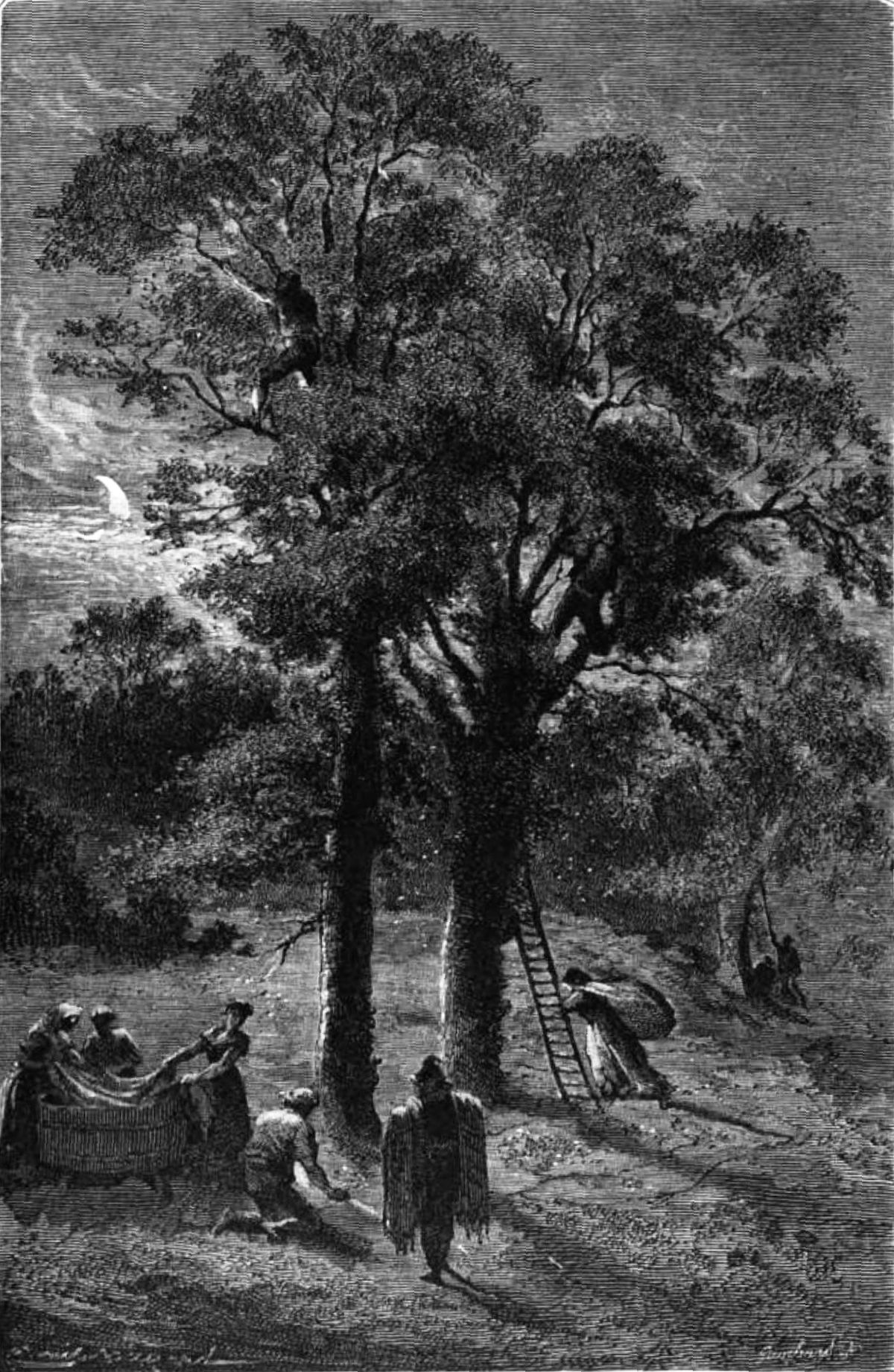
Collecting Cantharides, 19th century

=== Preparation of cantharidin ===
Cantharidin

Cantharidin, the principal active component in preparations of Spanish fly, was first isolated and named in 1810 by the French chemist Pierre Robiquet, who demonstrated that it was the principal agent responsible for the aggressively blistering properties of this insect's egg coating. It was asserted at that time that it was as toxic as the most violent poisons then known, such as strychnine.

Each beetle contains some 0.2–0.7 mg of cantharidin, males having significantly more than females. The beetle secretes the agent orally, and exudes it from its joints as a milky fluid. The potency of the insect as a blistering agent has been known since antiquity and the activity has been used in various ways. This has led to its small-scale commercial preparation and sale, in a powdered form known as cantharides (from the plural of Greek κανθαρίς, Kantharis, beetle), obtained from dried and ground beetles. The crushed powder is of yellow-brown to brown-olive color with iridescent reflections, is of disagreeable scent, and is bitter to taste. Cantharidin, the active agent, is a terpenoid, and is produced by some other insects, such as Epicauta immaculata.

=== Toxicity and poisonings ===
Cantharidin is dangerously toxic, inhibiting the enzyme phosphatase 2A. It causes irritation, blistering, bleeding and discomfort. These effects can escalate to erosion and bleeding of mucosa in each system, sometimes followed by severe gastro-intestinal bleeding and acute tubular necrosis and glomerular destruction, resulting in gastro-intestinal and renal dysfunction, organ failure, and death.

Preparations of Spanish fly and its active agent have been implicated in both inadvertent and intentional poisonings. Arthur Kendrick Ford was imprisoned in 1954 for the unintended deaths of two women surreptitiously given candies laced with cantharidin, which he had intended to act as an aphrodisiac. It has been suggested that George Washington was treated with Spanish fly for epiglottitis, the condition which caused his death.

=== Medical usage ===
Historically, preparations derived from Spanish fly were widely used in European medicine as vesicants, diuretics, and aphrodisiacs. The most common pharmaceutical forms included cantharides plasters (Emplastrum Cantharidum), ointments (Unguentum Cantharidum), and tinctures (Tinctura Cantharidum). Physicians believed that cantharidin exerted its effects after absorption into the bloodstream, while its excretion in urine caused irritation of the urinary tract, which was thought to account for its reputed aphrodisiac properties. Externally, cantharides preparations were applied to induce blistering and local inflammation as part of counterirritant therapy.

Contemporary, cantharidin is used primarily as a topical treatment for warts and molluscum contagiosum. In the United States, it is commonly formulated as a collodion preparation containing approximately 0.7% cantharidin. In addition, cantharidin and its derivatives, including norcantharidin, have attracted scientific interest because of their inhibitory effects on protein phosphatases and their potential applications in anticancer therapy.

=== Culinary uses ===
In Morocco and other parts of North Africa, spice blends known as ras el hanout sometimes included as a minor ingredient "green metallic beetles", inferred to be L. vesicatoria, although its sale in Moroccan spice markets was banned in the 1990s. Dawamesk, a spread or jam made in North Africa and containing hashish, almond paste, pistachio nuts, sugar, orange or tamarind peel, cloves, and other various spices, occasionally included cantharides.

=== Other uses ===
In ancient China, the beetles were mixed with human excrement, arsenic, and wolfsbane to make the world's first recorded stink bomb. In ancient Greece and Rome, Spanish fly was used to attempt to treat skin diseases, while in medieval Persia, Islamic medicine applied Spanish fly, named ḏarārīḥ (ذراریـح), to attempt to prevent rabies. An extract from Spanish fly was thought to be a strong aphrodisiac, and various love potions were named thusly.
