= The Star of Valencia =

The Star of Valencia may refer to:

- The Star of Valencia (German-language film), a 1933 German drama film directed by Alfred Zeisler
- The Star of Valencia (French-language film), a 1933 French drama film directed by Serge de Poligny
