= Dance into Happiness =

Dance into Happiness may refer to:

- Dance into Happiness (1930 film), a German musical film
- Dance into Happiness (1951 film), an Austrian musical comedy film
