= A Crafty Youth =

1931 film directed by Erich Schönfelder

- Directed by: Erich Schönfelder
- Written by: Arnold Lippschitz
- Produced by: Willy Morree
- Starring: Julius Falkenstein; Sig Arno; Olly Gebauer
- Cinematography: Willy Winterstein
- Edited by: Carl Otto Bartning
- Music by: Will Meisel
- Production companies: Engels & Schmidt Tonfilm
- Distributed by: Erich Engels-Film
- Release date: 23 October 1931
- Running time: 80 minutes
- Country: Germany
- Language: German

A Crafty Youth (German: Ein ausgekochter Junge) is a 1931 German comedy film directed by Erich Schönfelder, starring Julius Falkenstein, Sig Arno and Olly Gebauer. It was shot at the Grunewald Studios in Berlin. The film's sets were designed by the art directors Willi Herrmann and Herbert Lippschitz. It premiered in Hamburg in October 1931 and in Berlin the following month.

== Synopsis ==
Ignaz Fischbein, an employee in a fashion store, is hypnotised by a magician into believing that he is married to Mizzi, a girl he has just met and the two proceed to take a holiday in Bavaria. There, he encounters his boss, on a trip with his mistress posing as his wife, and the real husband of Mizzi.

== Cast ==
- Julius Falkenstein as Adolf Strohbach, besitzer eines Modelhauses
- Sig Arno as Ignaz Fischbein, sein Hausdiener
- Paul Westermeier as Paul Kausulke, Bierkutscher
- Olly Gebauer as Mizzi, seine Braut
- Albert Paulig as Brahmaputra, ein Hypnotiseur
- Henry Bender as Hugo Kunkel, inhaber der Pension Waldfrieden
- Károly Huszár as Gregor Pawlowitsch, ein Anarchista-D
- Maria Forescu as Vera, sein Gefährtin
- Lotte Werkmeister as Evchen Schikedanz
- Hermann Picha as Kasimir Makeldey, Naturforscher
- Elza Temary as Rolly-Polly, eine Tänzerin
- Gerhard Dammann as Hahn - Prokusist

== Bibliography ==
- Churton, Tobias. Aleister Crowley: The Beast in Berlin: Art, Sex, and Magick in the Weimar Republic. Simon and Schuster, 2014.
- Klaus, Ulrich J. Deutsche Tonfilme: Jahrgang 1931. Klaus-Archiv, 2006.
