= The Star of Valencia (French-language film) =

- Directed by: Serge de Poligny
- Written by: Rudolph Cartier; Otto Eis; Jean Galtier-Boissière; Axel Rudolf; Fritz Zeckendorf
- Produced by: Raoul Ploquin; Alfred Zeisler
- Starring: Brigitte Helm; Jean Gabin; Simone Simon
- Cinematography: Werner Brandes; Karl Puth
- Edited by: Wolfgang Becker
- Music by: Hans-Otto Borgmann; Richard Stauch
- Production companies: UFA; L'Alliance Cinématographique Européenne
- Distributed by: L'Alliance Cinématographique Européenne
- Release date: 16 June 1933
- Running time: 88 minutes
- Country: Germany
- Language: French

The Star of Valencia (French: L'étoile de Valencia) is a 1933 drama film directed by Serge de Poligny and starring Brigitte Helm, Jean Gabin and Simone Simon. It was the French-language version of the German film The Star of Valencia. Such multi-language versions were common in the era before dubbing became widespread. While made by largely the same crew except the director, it features a completely different cast.

It was produced by UFA at the Babelsberg Studios, and distributed by the company's French subsidiary L'Alliance Cinématographique Européenne. The film's sets were designed by the art director Otto Hunte. It incorporated footage shot on location in Mallorca from the German film.

== Cast ==
- Brigitte Helm as Marion Savedra
- Jean Gabin as Pedro Savedra
- Thomy Bourdelle as Le capitaine Mendoza
- Simone Simon as Rita
- Raymond Aimos as Un matelot
- Joe Alex as Diego
- Paul Amiot as Le capitaine Rustan
- Paule Andral as Elinor
- Paul Azaïs as Un joueur du Trocadéro
- Christian Casadesus as Le lieutenant Diaz
- Françoise Courvoisier as Une girl
- Lucien Dayle as Palesco - le patron du cabaret
- Roger Karl as Le commissaire
- Pierre Labry as José
- Ginette Leclerc as Une girl
- Pierre Sergeol as Beppo - un matelot
- Marcelle Yrven as Une girl
- Louis Zellas as Un machinist

== Bibliography ==
- Barbara Hales, Mihaela Petrescu and Valerie Weinstein. Continuity and Crisis in German Cinema, 1928-1936. Boydell & Brewer, 2016.
