= Walter Glynne =

Welsh tenor (1890–1970)

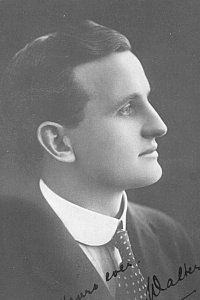
Walter Glynne in 1920

Walter Glynne (4 January 1890 – 29 July 1970) was a Welsh operatic and concert tenor who was also a popular recording artist.

== Early life and D’Oyly Carte ==
Thomas Glyn Walters was born at Loughor, Glamorgan, the oldest of five children of Elizabeth née Jones and David Walters, a farmer of Gowerton, Glamorganshire. He attended Gowerton Grammar School following which he worked as a bank clerk before pursuing a musical career. In 1910 he was awarded a scholarship to the Royal College of Music (RCM), where he concentrated on singing German lieder. On graduating from the RCM he was engaged as the principal tenor with the D'Oyly Carte Opera Company with whom he toured from March to December 1915 in Gilbert and Sullivan operas as Ralph Rackstraw in H.M.S. Pinafore, Tolloller in Iolanthe, Hilarion in Princess Ida and Colonel Fairfax in The Yeomen of the Guard. He then left the D'Oyly Carte to join the Artists' Rifles during World War I while continuing to sing in concerts in London until he obtained a commission in the Welsh Guards.

== Radio, The Proms and Recordings ==
On his return from the war Glynne mainly appeared in concert singing, primarily concentrating on ballad and oratorio. He made a number of appearances at the Henry Wood Promenade Concerts at the Royal Albert Hall, including in 1917, 1919, 1920, 1923, 1928 and 1930. He was one of the first singers in the United Kingdom to broadcast in the new medium of radio, which he did from Marconi House, forging a successful career on the airwaves owing to the clear tone of his voice. Glynne sang in the lyric concerts organised by Boosey and Company, Chappell & Co. and Cramer & Co. in London and made a number of appearances on the concert platform singing in oratorios.

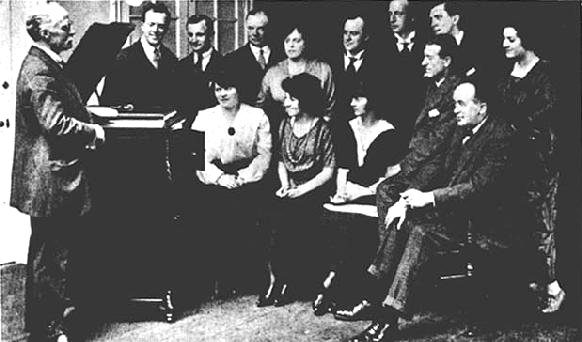
George W. Byng (standing, far left) at a recording session for The Pirates of Penzance in 1920. Glynne is standing second from left (Note: The singers, from left to right, were: Seated: Bessie Jones, Violet Essex, Sarah Jones, Harold Wilde, Robert Radford; Standing: Derek Oldham, Glynne, Ernest Pike, Edna Thornton, Peter Dawson, Edward Halland, George Baker and Nellie Walker.)

After the war, Glynn was also in demand as a recording artist, and he became particularly well-known for his recordings of ballads. In 1921 Glynne gained a recording contract with His Master's Voice at the suggestion of the company's music advisor, Sir Landon Ronald. Also in 1921 he married Helena 'Lena' Evans, with whom he had three children. He was involved in making a complete recording of The Pirates of Penzance (1920) conducted by George W. Byng; sang in the chorus for the recording of Patience (1921) and other early recordings of Gilbert and Sullivan by His Master's Voice again conducted by Byng; shared Ralph Rackstraw in the 1923 acoustic recording of H.M.S. Pinafore; sang Leonard Meryll and a portion of First Yeoman in The Yeomen of the Guard (1928) and Samuel Coleridge-Taylor's Hiawatha's Wedding Feast (1929) under the baton of Malcolm Sargent. In 1935 he recorded arias from Handel's Messiah. He made a number of recordings for the Welsh market including parts from Blodwen by Joseph Parry in addition to a number of Welsh ballads, sometimes accompanied by the Welsh Miners' Quartet from Llanelli.

== Later years ==
In 1929 he appeared in the British musical comedy film Splinters, which was based on the stage revue Splinters, while in 1930 he was in the film Peace of Mind.

In 1947 he retired to the Gower in Wales. He died in 1970 at his home The Bungalow in Port Eynon in Glamorganshire. In his will he left an estate valued at £22,206.
