= The Cheeky Devil =

1932 German film

- Directed by: Carl Boese; Heinz Hille
- Written by: Fritz Falkenstein; Paul Frank; Louis Verneuil (play); Irma von Cube
- Starring: Willy Fritsch; Camilla Horn; Ralph Arthur Roberts
- Cinematography: Werner Bohne; Konstantin Irmen-Tschet
- Edited by: Erno Hajos
- Music by: Hans-Otto Borgmann; Stephan Samek
- Production company: UFA
- Distributed by: UFA
- Release date: 29 April 1932
- Running time: 85 minutes
- Country: Germany
- Language: German

The Cheeky Devil (German: Der Frechdachs) is a 1932 German comedy film directed by Carl Boese and Heinz Hille and starring Willy Fritsch, Camilla Horn and Ralph Arthur Roberts. It was shot at the Babelsberg Studios in Berlin and premiered in the city's Gloria-Palast. The film's sets were designed by the art directors Willi A. Herrmann and Herbert Lippschitz. A separate French-language version, You Will Be My Wife, was also released.

== Cast ==
- Willy Fritsch as The Young Man
- Camilla Horn as Alice Ménard
- Ralph Arthur Roberts as Adolphe Ménard
- Else Elster as Loulou Gazelle
- Maria Forescu as Loulous Mutter
- Anton Pointner as Henri Latour
- Alexa von Porembsky as Annette
- Erich Kestin as Emil
- Ernst Behmer as Hotelportier

== Bibliography ==
- Waldman, Harry (2008). Nazi Films in America, 1933–1942. McFarland. ISBN 978-0-7864-3861-7.
