= George Baker (baritone) =

English singer (1885–1976)

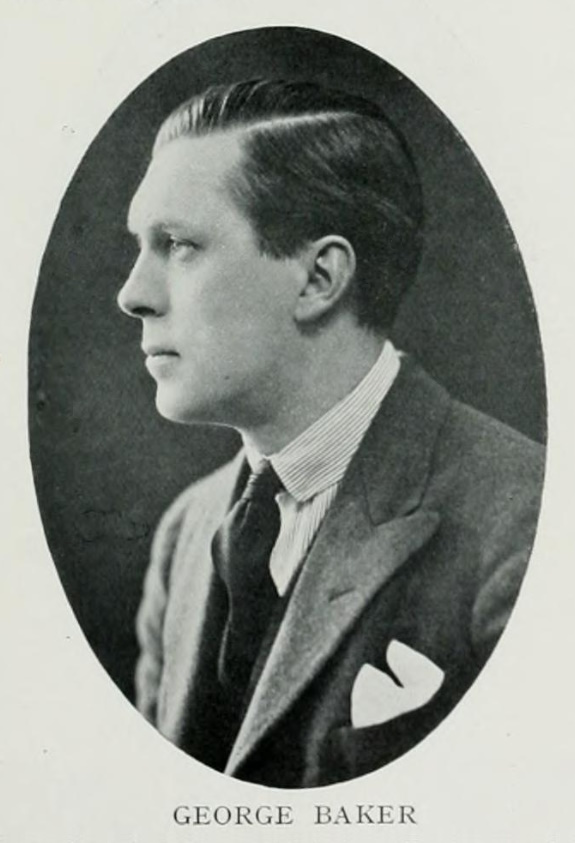
George Baker

George Baker (10 February 1885 – 8 January 1976) was an English singer. He is remembered for singing on thousands of gramophone records in a career that spanned 53 years, beginning in 1909. He is especially associated with the comic baritone roles in recordings of the Gilbert & Sullivan operas. Baker made his stage debut in 1915 and toured during the 1920s.

== Early life and career ==
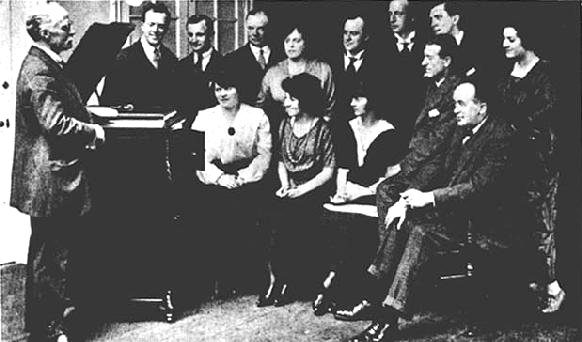
Baker (standing 2nd from right) with George W. Byng (standing at far left) at a recording session for The Pirates of Penzance in 1920

Baker was born in Birkenhead, the son of Walter Baker and his wife, Elizabeth, née Sanders. He studied violin, flute and piano as a child. At the age of 16, he served as organist and choirmaster at the Woodford Parish Church in Cheshire. He did the same at two churches in Birkenhead between 1903 and 1906. Baker studied singing with John Acton and won a scholarship to the Royal College of Music. There he studied with Gustave Garcia and was awarded a Patron Funds Grant to continue his vocal studies in Milan in 1914. He was married three times: first to the pianist/conductor Grace Lilian Bryant (1871–1955), from 1911 until their divorce in 1922, then to the singer Kathlyn Hilliard, who died in 1933, and last to Olive Groves, another singer and teacher, who died in 1974. His son with Hilliard, George Alan Hill Baker, was born in 1925 and died during the Second World War.

Baker first recorded for Pathé Records in 1909, while still a student; the piano accompanist and conductor (on his orchestrally-accompanied Pathé discs) was his future wife Lilian Bryant, musical director for Pathé's London studios. Pathé had just changed its emphasis from cylinders to vertically-cut disc records. After his Pathé debut, in the early 1910s Baker began making lateral-cut records for the Gramophone Company and other labels. In 1934 he recalled the experience:

We worked really hard in those days, for one song had to be sung perfectly at least six times. The records thus made would be played back again and further records made from them. The conditions under which we recorded were crude in the extreme. We sang in a tiny bare room and into a big tin trumpet, which was connected direct to the recording needle by a rubber tube. We sang collarless and in shirt sleeves, for the place quickly grew stifling. When electrical recording came in, this was all changed, and we now sing into microphones in beautiful rooms, not unlike broadcasting studios.

In many of Baker's early recordings, he was credited under pseudonyms such as George Portland, Arthur George, Victor Conway, Victor Norbury, Lelie Milton, George Barnes, Walter Duncan and Walter Jeffries. In a 1934 article in The Gramophone, Baker explained that in the early 1900s recording companies had limited options for singers suited to the primitive recording techniques, and so "to give a semblance of variety to their catalogues" they issued recordings of each singer under a number of pseudonyms. Baker recorded roles in the first British recordings of Parsifal by Richard Wagner, Hiawatha by Samuel Coleridge-Taylor, Salome by Richard Strauss and Beethoven's Ninth Symphony. He recorded in a wide range of repertory, including as "Uncle George" in a popular early series of children's recordings, in dance band records, hymns, and in the once popular recording of The Departure of a Troopship.

In 1915 Baker made his stage debut in the revue Now's the Time at the Alhambra Theatre. In the 1920s, he performed with both the Carl Rosa and British National Opera companies. He also toured Australia for J. C. Williamson Ltd. in 1922–23, playing the roles of Lord Harry Coe in the musical revue The Peep Show, the Hon. André d'Aubigny in The Lilac Domino and Blair Farquhar in Sally. During this tour, Baker made several recordings for the Aeolian Company. During 1927 and 1928, he toured in the United States and Canada as Macheath in The Beggar's Opera, making his New York debut in March 1928. In 1922 Baker was recorded as an examiner at the Royal College of Music and a professor of singing at the Guildhall School of Music.

== Later years ==
In later years, Baker rarely appeared on stage (except the concert stage), and he only appeared professionally on stage in one Gilbert and Sullivan opera, at the Royal Festival Hall in a performance of Trial by Jury, when he was 81 years old. Baker never performed on stage with the D'Oyly Carte Opera Company, but he recorded many of the Gilbert and Sullivan operas with that company and others and was known for his excellent diction, which is crucial in their rapid-fire patter songs. He sang in the first complete recording of The Mikado (1917) and subsequently recorded a role (and sometimes more than one role) in nearly all of the G&S operas, most of them at least twice, into the 1960s. He described the recording process in the early years as follows: "The first time we recorded the operas was in the days of the old tin trumpet, and principals joined in all the chorus-singing. When it came to our turn to sing in concerted numbers, we elbowed our way through the other singers to get to the trumpet in time." Baker made his final recording as a singer in December 1962, in Gilbert and Sullivan's Ruddigore, a few weeks before his 78th birthday.

Baker was also in demand as an administrator. He served as the BBC's Overseas Music Director from 1944 to 1947 and spent thirty years as committee member and often treasurer or chairman of the Royal Philharmonic Society. He was also the long-standing Honorary Secretary, and a trustee, of the Savage Club (which earlier counted among its notable members W. S. Gilbert and George Grossmith). He also served as Secretary of the Orchestral Employers' Association and for the Musicians' Benevolent Fund as a member of the committee.

Baker wrote two books on singing, This Singing Business (London: Ascherberg, 1947) and The Common Sense of Singing (London: Pergamon Press Ltd 1963) ISBN 0-08-010427-4, and wrote about singing in the collection A Career in Music (1950), edited by Robert Elkin. He also appeared as a music critic and writer in English newspapers.

He retired to Herefordshire in his final years and died in Hereford on 8 January 1976 at the age of 90.

== Gilbert and Sullivan recordings ==
Major-General's Song
George Baker sings the "I am the very model of a modern Major-General", conducted by George W. Byng (1920)

Baker made the following G&S recordings with HMV: 1917 The Mikado (Ko-Ko, Pish-Tush (part), and Pooh-Bah (part)), 1919 The Gondoliers (Antonio, Don Alhambra (part), Duke of Plaza-Toro and Giuseppe); 1920 The Yeomen of the Guard (Jack Point and Sergeant Meryll (part)); 1920 The Pirates of Penzance (Major-General Stanley); 1921 Patience (Bunthorne and Major); and 1922 Iolanthe (Lord Chancellor).

From 1924 to 1933, he made the following recordings with D'Oyly Carte: 1924 Ruddigore (Robin Oakapple); 1927 Gondoliers (Giuseppe); 1926 Mikado (Pish-Tush); 1927 Trial (Usher); 1929 Pirates (Major-General) 1928 Yeomen (Jack Point); 1929 Iolanthe (Lord Chancellor); 1930 Patience (Bunthorne); 1930 H.M.S. Pinafore (Captain Corcoran); 1931 Gondoliers (Duke of Plaza-Toro); 1931 Pirates (Major-General); 1931 Ruddigore (Robin Oakapple) 1931 Yeomen (Jack Point); 1932 Princess Ida (Florian); and 1933 The Sorcerer (John Wellington Wells).

With Columbia, in 1931, Baker recorded Gondoliers (Don Alhambra and Giuseppe (part)); Yeomen (Sergeant Meryll and Wilfred Shadbolt); and Iolanthe (Lord Chancellor). On the Sir Malcolm Sargent/Glyndebourne series, he recorded: 1958 Pinafore (Sir Joseph Porter); 1959 Iolanthe (Lord Chancellor); 1961 Pirates (Major-General); 1961 Trial (The Learned Judge); 1963 Patience (Bunthorne); and 1963 Ruddigore (Robin Oakapple).

For the BBC, Baker recorded: 1966 Trial (Judge) and 1966 Ida (King Gama). He is also heard on a 1970 recording compiling many of his early recordings, called A Tribute to George Baker: Vintage Compilation. In 1973, for an LP set, The Art of the Savoyard, Baker recorded his reminiscences of Richard Temple, Henry Lytton, Bertha Lewis, C. H. Workman, Walter Passmore and other original Savoyards.(Pearl LP set GEM 118/120)
