= Clemens Schmalstich =

German composer, conductor, and Nazi politician

Clemens Carl Otto Schmalstich (8 October 1880, Posen – 15 July 1960, Berlin) was a German composer, conductor, and Nazi politician.

== Life ==
Born on 8 October 1880 in Posen, Clemens Carl-Otto Schmalstich was originally a student attending the Posen Friedrich-Wilhelm Gymnasium on the wishes of his father (who would not hear of his having a serious course of musical education), and then had four semesters in Philosophy at Bonn. In 1902 the young student was able to attend the Königliche Hochschule (Royal High school) for Music at Berlin. There he 'learnt' piano with Professor Ernst Rudorff, but then two years later he transferred as a student of composition to the master-class of Engelbert Humperdinck (best known as the creator of the opera Hänsel and Gretel), who became a fatherly friend to him and arranged for him to obtain a position as conductor at the New Theatre in Berlin, where, among other works, he conducted Humperdinck's music for Shakespeare's The Tempest. Soon after this Schmalstich won a whole range of academy awards. In 1910 his friend Leo Blech summoned him to the Royal Opera in Berlin, where Schmalstich worked as Kapellmeister (orchestral conductor) until 1919 alongside Blech, Richard Strauss and Karl Muck.

After some years of freelance activity on numerous foreign tours, in 1927 he took on the artistic directorship of the Electrola Company in Berlin, and in 1931 was able to follow the call to become a teacher at the State High School Academy. In the same year he joined the Nazi Party (Membership number 1.106.153). He collaborated in Alfred Rosenberg's Taskforce for German Culture (Kampfbund für deutsche Kultur) as Area Cultural Director and Branch-Leader for Light Music and Operetta, and was Presiding delegate in the Nazi's Union of German Artists.

At the High School for Music he was active until 1945 as collegiate Professor, director of the conducting classes. As he had earlier on in the 1920s conducted the Berlin Concertverein and the Berlin Philharmonic, from 1945 he took control of the Siemens Orchestra.

As composer, Schmalstich wrote about 120 songs with piano or orchestral accompaniment, the operas Beatrice (1940) and Die Hochzeitsfackel (1943), two symphonies, three concerti for piano and orchestra, a Sinfonietta, the symphonic poem Tragischer Epilog (on the death of Pope Pius XII), frequently broadcast, other orchestral suites, many piano works, and the operettas Tänzerin aus Liebe (1919) and Wenn die Zarin lächelt (1937). His youthful work Peterchens Mondfahrt was frequently performed from 1913 onwards on stages in Germany and abroad.

Schmalstich's film work began with a Kultur-film about Goethe, and the heyday of Ufa-Kulturfilms is tied up with his name. Above all he composed the music for the culture-films Das Wort aus Stein (1939) and Nürnberg, die Stadt der Reichsparteitage (1940). The films made in 1945, Das Jahr der Elche and Frauenturne (Anmut und Kraft. Frauensport unter der Zeitlupe) were first premiered during the 1957 Berlin Festival.

Among his thirteen feature films were the Erich Waschneck presentations Abel mit der Mundharmonika, Liebesleute (Renate Müller, Gustav Fröhlich, Harry Liedtke), Regine (Luise Ullrich, Anton Walbrook) and „Musik im Blut“ (Sybille Schmitz), as well as the Heinz Rühmann film Lachende Erben by Max Ophüls and the Heinrich George film Ein Volksfeind produced by Hans Steinhoff.

Clemens Schmalstich was for more than 50 years married to Lissi Schmalstich-Kurz, formerly a celebrated concert and oratorio singer and author, who most notably wrote the libretto for his opera Beatrice. Schmalstich remained loyal to his chosen home of Berlin until his death.

== Orchestral works (selection) ==
- Amor und Psyche (Cupid and Psyche) op. 103 (1933)
- Aus einer kleinen Stadt (From a small town) op. 94, Suite (1936)
- Bilder aus Ceylon, Suite für Klavier (Pictures from Ceylon, Suite for piano) (1947)
- Nordische Suite (Nordic Suite) op. 112 (1947)
- 2 Serenades for String Orchestra op. 104 (1956)

== Selected filmography ==
- Laughing Heirs (1933)
- At the Strasbourg (1934)
- Music in the Blood (1934)
- Regine (1935)
- A Woman of No Importance (1936)
- The Impossible Woman (1936)
- Martha (1936)
- An Enemy of the People (1937)
- Wibbel the Tailor (1939)
- Mistake of the Heart (1939)

== Honours ==
- State Service Cross, 1st Class. (1957)
