= Dance into Happiness (1930 film) =

1930 film

- Directed by: Max Nosseck
- Written by: Arnold Lippschitz
- Produced by: Lola Kreutzberg
- Starring: Ilse Stobrawa; Fred Doederlein; Lotte Hané
- Cinematography: Eduard von Borsody
- Music by: Siegwart Ehrlich
- Production company: Lola Kreutzberg Film
- Distributed by: Biograph-Film
- Release date: 15 October 1930
- Running time: 72 minutes
- Country: Germany
- Language: German

Dance into Happiness (German: Der Tanz ins Glück) is a 1930 German musical film directed by Max Nosseck and starring Ilse Stobrawa, Fred Doederlein and Lotte Hané. The film's sets were designed by the art director Herbert O. Phillips.

== Cast ==
- Ilse Stobrawa as Lotte Hübner
- Fred Doederlein
- Lotte Hané as Frau Hübner
- Alwin Neuß as Richard Grothe
- Heinrich Gotho as Oskar Hübner, mailman
- Liselotte Schaak as Lizzi Brandt
- Julius E. Hermann as Mr. Brown, gramophone manufacturer
- Max Nosseck as Goliath Wellenschlag, animal breeder
- Claire Reigbert
