= Laughing Heirs =

1933 film

- Directed by: Max Ophüls
- Written by: Trude Herka (story); Felix Joachimson; Max Ophüls
- Produced by: Bruno Duday
- Starring: Lien Deyers; Heinz Rühmann; Ida Wüst
- Cinematography: Eduard Hoesch
- Edited by: Herbert B. Fredersdorf
- Music by: Clemens Schmalstich
- Production company: UFA
- Distributed by: UFA
- Release date: 6 March 1933
- Running time: 76 minutes
- Country: Germany
- Language: German

Laughing Heirs (German: Lachende Erben) is a 1933 German comedy film directed by Max Ophüls and starring Heinz Rühmann, Max Adalbert, Lien Deyers and Friedrich Ettel. It was shot at the Babelsberg and Tempelhof Studios in Berlin and on location in the Rhineland. The film's sets were designed by the art director Benno von Arent.The premiere was on 6 March 1933.

== Synopsis ==
A young salesman may inherit a wine-estate on one condition: he can't drink a drop of alcohol for at least a month.

== Cast ==
- Heinz Rühmann as Peter Frank
- Lien Deyers as Gina, Robert Stumms Tochter
- Ida Wüst as Britta Bockelmann
- Max Adalbert as Justus Bockelmann
- Lizzi Waldmüller as Liane Heller
- Julius Falkenstein as Dr. Weinhöppel, Notar
- Walter Janssen as Robert Stumm
- Friedrich Ettel as Schlemmel, Kellermeister
- Elfriede Jera as Sekretärin von Robert Stamm
- Heinrich Gotho as Verwandter bei der Testamentseröffnung
- Illo Gutschwager as Junger Gast bei Schlemmel
- Friedl Haerlin as Nebenrolle
- Vera Spohr as Junge Zugreisende
- Walter Steinbeck as Ein Fahrgast
- Max Wilmsen as Schiffspassagier

== Bibliography ==
- Kreimeier, Klaus (1999). The Ufa Story: A History of Germany's Greatest Film Company, 1918–1945. University of California Press. ISBN 978-0-520-22069-0.
