= The Old Scoundrel =

1932 film

- Directed by: Heinz Hille
- Written by: Zsolt Harsányi; Kálmán Mikszáth (novel); Emeric Pressburger
- Produced by: Ernst Hugo Charell
- Starring: Rosy Barsony; Tibor Halmay; Károly Sugar
- Cinematography: István Eiben; Karl Puth; István Somkúti
- Edited by: Erno Hajos
- Music by: Erno Buder
- Production companies: Hunnia Filmstúdió; UFA
- Release date: 21 December 1932
- Running time: 102 minutes
- Countries: Germany; Hungary
- Language: Hungarian

The Old Scoundrel (Hungarian: A vén gazember) is a 1932 German-Hungarian drama film directed by Heinz Hille and starring Rosy Barsony, Tibor Halmay and Károly Sugar. It was made as a co-production between the Hunnia Film Studio and German's leading film company UFA. A German-language version And the Plains Are Gleaming was also made by the same director, and featuring several of the same cast members. The film's sets were designed by the art director Márton Vincze.

== Cast ==
- Rosy Barsony as Mária, Inokay lánya
- Tibor Halmay as Balassa gróf
- Károly Sugar as Borly Gáspár
- Ferenc Táray as Inokay Kornél báró
- Ilona Aczél as Inokay felesége
- Magda Kun as Magda
- Erzsébet Gyöngyössy as Balassa grófnõ
- Gusztáv Ilosvay as László, Borly Gáspár unokája
- Gusztáv Vándory as Thury
- Emilia Étsy as Perkálné
- Béla Venczel as Draskóczy tábornok
- Rezsö Harsányi as Vizsgálóbíró
- Imre Kovács as Jegyzõ
- Tivadar Bilicsi as Borügynök
- Hugó Déri as Másik borügynök

== Bibliography ==
- Ferenc Lohr. Hallom a filmet. Magvető, 1989.
