= Kathlyn Hilliard =

Scottish singer (1892–1933)

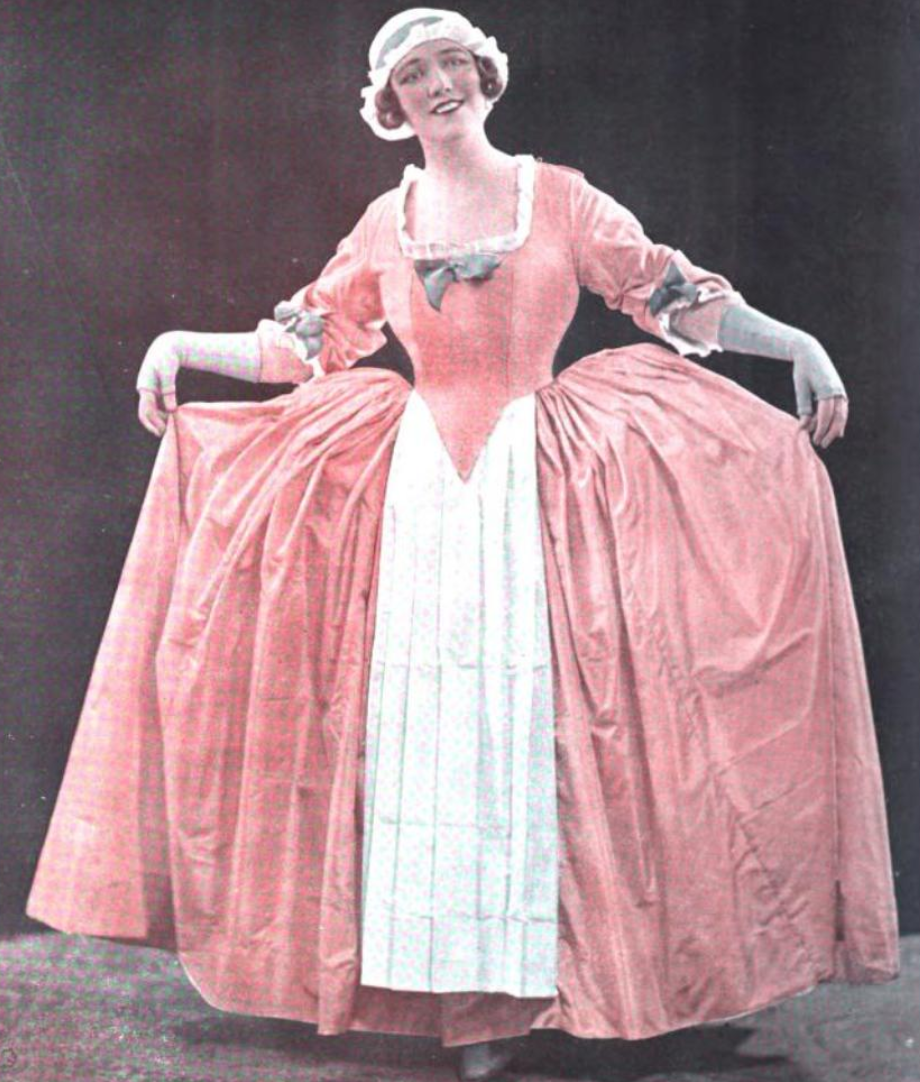
- Kathlyn Hilliard in costume as Polly Peachum in The Beggar's Opera (1922)
- Born: 17 April 1892; Glasgow, Scotland, U.K.
- Died: 7 October 1933 (aged 41); Worthing, Sussex, U.K.
- Occupations: Singer, actress
- Spouse: George Baker

Kathlyn Hilliard (17 April 1892 – 7 October 1933) was a Scottish singer and actress. She was principal soprano with the British National Opera Company (BNOC) from 1925 to 1928.

== Early life and education ==
Hilliard was born in Glasgow.

== Career ==
Hilliard appeared on the London stage in musical comedies, revues, and operas, including The Beggar's Opera (1922, 1925), The Way of the World (1924), The Street Singer (1924), Riverside Nights (1926), Parsifal (1927), Götterdämmerung (1927), The Pride of the Regiment (1932) and The Dubarry (1933). She toured in Australia in 1922 and 1923. She was principal soprano with the British National Opera Company from 1925 to 1928. Her appearances with the BNOC included parts in Coffee Cantata (1925), Pagliacci (1926), Hansel and Gretel (1926), Romeo and Juliet (1926), The Tales of Hoffmann (1926), The Marriage of Figaro (1926, 1927), La bohème (1926, 1927), Carmen (1927), Faust (1928), and La Vie Parisienne (1929). In 1930 she was in a production of Lilac Time in Cardiff and Liverpool. She fell ill while performing in a 1932 production of Noël Coward's Bitter Sweet in Liverpool.

Hilliard made several recordings. In 1926 she was a soloist at the Crystal Palace, for a concert of Handel opera choruses arranged by Sir Henry Wood. She appeared in two short silent films, Lily of Killarney (1927) and Maritana (1927). In 1932 she sang at the opening of a housing and furniture exhibition at Alsager, and sang on radio broadcasts.

== Personal life ==
Hilliard married baritone George Baker in 1924. They had a son, George Alan Hill Baker, born in 1925, who died during the Second World War. They owned a villa in Algiers in the 1920s. She died in 1933, at the age of 41, in Worthing, Sussex. Her collapse and early death were linked to "the Dubarry Jinx", as a series of actresses died or suffered other setbacks after appearing in that show, including her predecessor in the show, Anny Ahlers.
