= Love Must Be Understood =

1933 film directed by Hans Steinhoff

- German film poster
- German: Liebe muss verstanden sein
- Directed by: Hans Steinhoff
- Written by: Herbert Juttke
- Produced by: Karl Ritter
- Starring: Rosy Barsony; Georg Alexander; Wolf Albach-Retty
- Cinematography: Otto Baecker; Konstantin Irmen-Tschet
- Edited by: Milo Harbich
- Music by: Willi Kollo
- Production company: UFA
- Distributed by: UFA
- Release date: 4 August 1933
- Running time: 87 minutes
- Country: Germany
- Language: German

Love Must Be Understood (German: Liebe muss verstanden sein) is a 1933 German musical comedy film directed by Hans Steinhoff and starring Rosy Barsony, Georg Alexander, and Wolf Albach-Retty. It was shot at the Babelsberg Studios in Berlin. The film's sets were designed by the art director Benno von Arent.

== Cast ==
- Rosy Barsony as Margit Raday
- Max Gülstorff as Bruno C. Plaumann
- Käthe Haack as Lisa
- Georg Alexander as Peter Lambach
- Hilde Hildebrand as Ellen Parker
- Wolf Albach-Retty as Bobby Brandt
- Oscar Sabo as Oskar Nickel
- Oskar Sima as detective
- Theo Lingen as Hotel-Emil
- Hansi Arnstaedt
- Ernst Behmer
- Rudolf Biebrach
- Gerhard Dammann
- Aenne Goerling
- Harry Halm
- Anna Müller-Lincke
- Paul Rehkopf
- Walter Steinbeck

== Bibliography ==
- Jacobsen, Wolfgang. Babelsberg: ein Filmstudio 1912-1992. Argon, 1992.
