= Olly Gebauer =

Austrian film actress

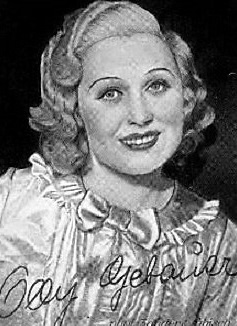
- Gebauer in the 1930s
- Born: 13 July 1908; Vienna, Austro-Hungarian Empire
- Died: 22 February 1937 (aged 28); Vienna, Austria
- Occupation: Actress
- Years active: 1931–1937

Olly Gebauer (1908–1937) was an Austrian film actress. During the early sound era she established herself in the German film industry. Following the rise of the Nazi Party to power in 1933 she fled into exile with her Jewish husband, director Max Nosseck. In 1934 she starred in a Portuguese film Wild Cattle (1934) before they settled in her native Vienna. She died in 1937 after a long illness.

== Selected filmography ==
- A Crafty Youth (1931)
- The Emperor's Sweetheart (1931)
- Thea Roland (1932)
- Spell of the Looking Glass (1932)
- A Bit of Love (1932)
- The Secret of Johann Orth (1932)
- Manolescu, Prince of Thieves (1933)
- Marion, That's Not Nice (1933)
- The Emperor's Waltz (1933)
- Model Wanted (1933)
- Tell Me Who You Are (1933)
- Wild Cattle (1934)
- Leap into Bliss (1934)
- Suburban Cabaret (1935)

== Bibliography ==
- Vieira, Patricia. Portuguese Film, 1930-1960,: The Staging of the New State Regime. A&C Black, 2013.
