= And the Plains Are Gleaming =

1933 film

- Directed by: Heinz Hille
- Written by: Kálmán Mikszáth (novel); Emeric Pressburger
- Produced by: Heinz Hille
- Starring: Rosy Barsony; Károly Sugar; Wolf Albach-Retty
- Cinematography: István Eiben; Karl Puth; István Somkúti
- Edited by: Erno Hajos
- Music by: Erno Buder
- Production companies: Hunnia Filmstúdió; UFA
- Distributed by: UFA
- Release date: 13 February 1933
- Countries: Germany; Hungary
- Language: German

And the Plains Are Gleaming (German: ...und es leuchtet die Puszta) is a 1933 German-Hungarian drama film directed by Heinz Hille and starring Rosy Barsony, Károly Sugar and Wolf Albach-Retty. It was shot at the Hunnia Studios in Budapest. The film's sets were designed by the art directors Herbert Lippschitz and Márton Vincze. A separate Hungarian-language version The Old Scoundrel was also made.

== Cast ==
- Rosy Barsony as Baroneß Maria Inockay
- Károly Sugar as Kaspar Borly, Gutsverwalter
- Wolf Albach-Retty as Peter Borly, Husarenleutnant
- Tibor Halmay as Graf Balassa, Leutnant
- Magda Kun as Magda, Marias Freundin
- Heinz Salfner as Baron Inokay
- Hansi Arnstaedt as Baronin Inokay
- Olga Limburg as Gräfin Balassa
- Hans Zesch-Ballot as Thury
- Béla Venczel as General Draskoczy
- Franz Göbels as Untersuchungsrichter
- Emilia Étsy as Frau Perkàl
- Tivadar Bilicsi as 1. Weinreisender
- Hugó Déri as 2. Weinreisender
- Karl Bischof
- Isabella von Papen

== Production ==
Heinz Hille directed the film with a script written by Emeric Pressburger. It cost $100,000 to produce.

== Works cited ==
- Waldman, Harry (2008). Nazi Films In America, 1933-1942. McFarland & Company. ISBN 9780786438617.

== Bibliography ==
- Salwolke, Scott (1997). The Films of Michael Powell and the Archers. Lanham, MD: Scarecrow Press. ISBN 978-0-8108-3183-4.
