= Lien Deyers =

Dutch film actress

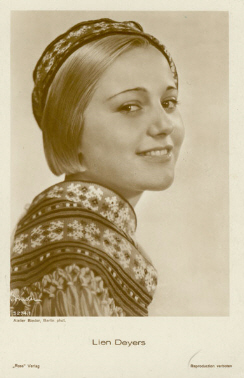
- Born: Nicolina Spanier; 5 November 1909; Amsterdam, Netherlands
- Died: 1965, estimated United States
- Other names: Nicolina Dijjers Liefjes; Lien Deyers Rubin; Lien Deyers-Wallburg
- Years active: 1928–1937
- Spouses: Alfred Zeisler (m. 1934; div. 1939) Frank Orsatti (m. 1940; div. 1942) Victor Rubin (m. 1944; div. 1948) Lawrence Adlon (m. 1951, divorced)

Lien Deyers (formerly Nicolina Dijjers Spanier, born Nicolina Spanier; 5 November 1909 – around 1965) was a Dutch actress based in Germany.

== Early life ==
Lien Deyers was born Nicolina Spanier in Amsterdam on 5 November 1909, the daughter of Nathan Spanier, a piano teacher (1857–1916), and Johanna Adriana Nicolina Liefjes, a seamstress (1889–1920). She had a half-brother, Andries Liefjes, (1906–1960), who was from a previous relationship of Liefjes. After Spanier’s death, Johanna married the hotel-owner Egbert Dijjers (1874–1948) and the family moved to The Hague.

At the early age of five her potential was noted by Amsterdam theatre owner and film producer David Sluizer, but she did not enter the film business. Deyers spent most of her childhood years in The Hague until her stepfather, Dijjers, remarried to the Austrian actress Lotte Erol. Deyers then traveled between The Hague, Vienna (where the family mostly lived), and Lausanne, where she went to a private school and became fluent in French.

== Career ==
In August 1926 the Austrian weekly Mein Film staged a competition for new young screen talent and Lien submitted her photograph. Together with twenty other contestants she was chosen for a screen-test by director Hans Otto, which she won. Subsequently, during an autograph session in the Mein Film offices in 1927, she was introduced to the well-known Austrian director Fritz Lang, who happened to be in need of a young blonde for a role in his new movie Spione, written by his wife, the novelist and screenwriter Thea von Harbou. Lang had her travel to Berlin for a screen test, and she was indeed given a secondary, racy role in Spione. She was billed as Lien Deyers because Dijjers frequently was misspelled or mispronounced in German-speaking countries.

Lang had her sign a six-year contract to the UFA studios in Berlin. The contract soon turned out to be mere slavery, and Deyers sought a court decision to end it. In November 1928, the court ruled in her favor, a verdict welcomed by hundreds of Berlin-based actors with similar contracts. In turn Lang appealed and was granted a 10,000 Reichs-mark pay-off, to be fulfilled in monthly payments. Deyers and Lang already had grown to dislike each other during the shooting of Spione.

She was featured in nine silent movies and 25 talkies over the following eight years, mostly playing the Ingénue in comedies, some of them French productions. Her initial popularity, especially with women, was due to her sentimental role in William Dieterle's The Saint and Her Fool.

In 1934, she married the American-born German producer and director Alfred Zeisler, who had worked in Germany since 1924. She had met him when he directed the movie Sein Scheidungsgrund, in which she played the main character. Starting with this movie, Deyers concentrated on comedy, only occasionally appearing in dramatic roles.

Deyers got into conflict with the new politics of Nazi Germany: She had to take on German citizenship to remain assured of roles. She mainly was typecast for typical "Aryan" characters like the exemplary girlish blonde in The Company's in Love (1932) and Gold (1934). Most importantly, she feared the Nazis would discover she was half-Jewish (her father Spanier was Jewish). Because Zeisler was Jewish, too, they fled Germany in 1935. Zeisler settled in Britain, and in 1936, he directed Cary Grant in The Amazing Quest of Ernest Bliss. Deyers traveled between London and The Hague, and in 1937, she signed for a major role in the Dutch-Italian movie The Three Wishes. For unknown reasons, she did not play the part and joined her husband in London in 1938. By this time, their marriage was faltering and a divorce was inevitable. In 1939, the couple moved to California, where they soon divorced.

== Later years ==
Deyers, who had a reputation of being "extremely mentally unstable", could not find work in Hollywood. There were many exiled German actors all vying for the few roles that required a foreign accent. She developed an alcohol addiction and relied financially on old contacts like the German actor and director William Dieterle and in particular the Austrian-American film agent Paul Kohner and his European Film Fund that he had founded to aid German actors in exile. Over a brief period, she married three more times: with kingpin actors' agent Frank Orsatti, one of the Orsatti Brothers (who evidently could not get her involved in movies either), from 1940 until 1942; with furrier Victor Rubin from 1944 to 1948; and with Lawrence Adlon, grandson of the Berlin hotel-magnate Lorenz Adlon in January 1951.

On 3 August 1949, Deyers petitioned for American citizenship.

The Dutch actor/comedian Wim Sonneveld met with her in 1957 during the shooting of Silk Stockings with Fred Astaire and Cyd Charisse, in which he played a supporting role. He reportedly was shocked by her appearance.

After 1957, she faded from public view. She was arrested in Las Vegas in 1964 for loitering and disorderly conduct. In a later interview former husband Zeisler estimated her year of death to be 1965.

In 1982, Deyers sent a birthday greeting and a photograph of herself - then 73 years old - to Heinz Rühmann, signing as Lien Dyers Wallburg.

== Filmography ==
- 1928: Spione, English title Spies (silent; thriller directed by Fritz Lang, with Rudolf Klein-Rogge, Lien Deyers supporting as Kitty)
- 1928: Haus Nummer 17, English title Number 17 (silent; crime/drama by Géza von Bolváry, featuring Deyers as main character Elsie Ackroyd)
- 1928: Die Heilige und ihr Narr, English title The Saint and Her Fool (silent; romantic drama by and with William Dieterle, with Deyers featuring as main character Rosemarie von Brauneck)
- 1928-1929: Rund um die Liebe (compilation with Deyers in clippings)
- 1929: Das Donkosakenlied (silent; operetta with Deyers as Natascha)
- 1929: Ich lebe für dich, English title Triumph of Love (silent; romantic drama by and with William Dieterle, main character Deyers as Nicoline)
- 1929: Frühlingsrauschen, English title Rustle of Spring (silent; romantic drama by and with William Dieterle, main character Deyers as Viola)
- 1929: Le Capitaine Fracasse (silent; historical drama by Alberto Cavalcanti, main character Deyers as Isabelle)
- 1930: Gehetzte Mädchen (silent; director Erich Schönfelder)
- 1930: Der Nächste, bitte! (silent; comedy by Erich Schönfelder, Deyers supporting as Minchen Bangigkeit)
- 1930: Rosenmontag (drama by Hans Steinhoff, main character Deyers as Traute Reimann)
- 1930: The Jumping Jack (comedy by E. W. Emo, main character Deyers as Lissy)
- 1930: Das alte Lied (romantic drama by Erich Waschneck, main character Deyers as Annerl Haslinger)
- 1931: Die Männer um Lucie, English title The Men Around Lucy (drama by Alexander Korda, Deyers supporting as Daisy)
- 1931: Der Mann, der seinen Mörder sucht, English title The Man in Search of His Murderer (black comedy by Robert Siodmak, main character Deyers as Kitty alongside Heinz Rühmann)
- 1931: Sein Scheidungsgrund (comedy by Alfred Zeisler, featuring Deyers als Liane Roland)
- 1931: Der Herzog von Reichstadt, English title The Duke of Reichstadt (historical drama, main character Deyers as Maria Louise)
- 1932: Durchlaucht amüsiert sich (comedy, main character Deyers as Maria)
- 1932: Hasenklein kann nichts dafür (comedy by Max Neufeld, main character Deyers as Das Mädchen Hasenklein)
- 1932: Melodie der Liebe, English title Melody of Love (musical with Deyers supporting alongside Richard Tauber)
- 1932: Die verliebte Firma, English title The Company's in Love (comedy by Max Ophüls, main character Deyers as Gretl Krummbichler)
- 1933: Ist mein Mann nicht fabelhaft? (comedy, main character Deyers as Lu)
- 1933: Lachende Erben, English title The Merry Heirs (comedy by Max Ophüls, main character Deyers as Gina alongside Heinz Rühmann)
- 1933: Die vom Niederrhein (comedy, main character Deyers as Hanne Stahl)
- 1933: Die Fahrt ins Grüne (drama, main character Deyers as Lotte Krause alongside Hermann Thimig)
- 1934: Der Doppelbräutigam, English title The Double Fiance (comedy, main character Deyers as Eva)
- 1934: Ich sing' mich in dein Herz hinein (musical with Deyers supporting as Doris)
- 1934: Gold (science-fiction with Hans Albers, Deyers supporting as Margit Moller)
- 1934: Karneval und Liebe (comedy, main character Deyers as Loretta alongside Hermann Thimig)
- 1934: Der Vetter aus Dingsda, English title The Cousin from Nowhere (operetta/comedy, main character Deyers as Julia)
- 1935: Ein ganzer Kerl (comedy, main character Deyers as Grete Bolle)
- 1935: I Love All the Women (musical comedy with Deyers as Susi alongside Jan Kiepura and Adele Sandrock)
- 1935: Punks Arrives from America (drama featuring Deyers as Marlis alongside Sybille Schmitz)
- 1935: Die selige Exzellenz, English title His Late Excellency (comedy with Deyers supporting as Else)

== Bibliography ==
- Kay Weniger: 'Es wird im Leben dir mehr genommen als gegeben …'. Lexikon der aus Deutschland und Österreich emigrierten Filmschaffenden 1933 bis 1945. Eine Gesamtübersicht. S. 138 f., Acabus-Verlag, Hamburg 2011, ISBN 978-3-86282-049-8
- Gemünden, Gerd. A Foreign Affair: Billy Wilder's American Films. Berghahn Books, 2008.
