= Peter Erkelenz =

German actor

- Born: 1894
- Occupation: Film actor
- Years active: 1931–1938

Peter Erkelenz (1894–?) was a German film actor.

== Selected filmography ==
- The Murder Trial of Mary Dugan (1931)
- Men Behind Bars (1931)
- The Sea Ghost (1931)
- Sacred Waters (1932)
- Dream of the Rhine (1933)
- The Star of Valencia (1933)
- A Door Opens (1933)
- The Four Musketeers (1934)
- Hundred Days (1935)
- The Empress's Favourite (1936)
- Ninety Minute Stopover (1936)
- The Deruga Case (1938)
