= The Company's in Love =

1932 film

- Lien Deyers and Gustav Fröhlich at the swimming baths
- German: Die verliebte Firma
- Directed by: Max Ophüls
- Written by: Bruno Granichstaedten; Ernst Marischka; Fritz Zeckendorf
- Starring: Gustav Fröhlich; Anny Ahlers; Lien Deyers
- Cinematography: Karl Puth
- Edited by: Else Baum
- Music by: Bruno Granichstaedten
- Production company: Deutsches Lichtspiel-Syndikat
- Distributed by: Deutsches Lichtspiel-Syndikat
- Release date: 22 February 1932
- Running time: 73 minutes
- Country: Germany
- Language: German

The Company's in Love (German: Die verliebte Firma) is a 1932 German comedy film directed by Max Ophüls, starring Gustav Fröhlich, Anny Ahlers and Lien Deyers.

It was shot at the Staaken Studios in Berlin and on location in Switzerland. The film's sets were designed by Robert Neppach and Erwin Scharf.

== Plot ==
When a temperamental film star storms off the set, a production crew shooting in the Alps decide to recruit a local post office employee to replace her. Complications ensue once they return to Berlin as they have all fallen in love with her.

== Cast ==
- Gustav Fröhlich as Werner Loring jr. - deputy. Director of Ideal Tonfilm
- Anny Ahlers as Peggy Barling - Film star
- Lien Deyers as Gretl Krummbichler - Post office employee
- Ernö Verebes as Heinrich Pulver - Assistant Director
- José Wedorn as Leo Lamberti - Chamber singer
- Leonard Steckel as Harry Bing - Director
- Hubert von Meyerinck as Fritz Willner - Screenwriter
- Fritz Steiner as Toni Bauer - Composer
- Hermann Krehan as Karl Martini - Cinematographer
- Werner Finck as Franz Klingemüller - Swiss Post Board of Management
