= Punks Arrives from America =

1935 film directed by Karl Heinz Martin

- Directed by: Karl Heinz Martin
- Written by: Walter Jerven
- Based on: Punks Arrives from America by Ludwig von Wohl
- Produced by: Robert Neppach; Alfred Zeisler
- Starring: Attila Hörbiger; Lien Deyers; Ralph Arthur Roberts; Sybille Schmitz
- Cinematography: Carl Drews
- Edited by: Oswald Hafenrichter
- Music by: Werner Bochmann
- Production company: UFA
- Distributed by: UFA
- Release date: 25 January 1935
- Running time: 90 minutes
- Country: Germany
- Language: German

Punks Arrives from America (German: Punks kommt aus Amerika) is a 1935 German comedy film directed by Karl Heinz Martin and starring Attila Hörbiger, Lien Deyers, Ralph Arthur Roberts and Sybille Schmitz. Produced and distributed by UFA, it was made at the company's Babelsberg Studios in Potsdam. The film's sets were designed by the art director Otto Guelstorff. Location shooting took place around Hamburg. Along with Fresh Wind from Canada it was one of several seemingly innocuous comedies released that supported the Nazi Party's Heim ins Reich policy.

== Synopsis ==
A German citizen who has been away in the United States, and has become americanised and acquired the nickname "Punks" returns home after some bad fortune. He manages to eventually overcome his family and former friends' bad opinion of him by rescuing his uncle's business from a robbery.

== Cast ==
- Attila Hörbiger as Werner 'Punks' Holzhausen
- Lien Deyers as Marlis
- Ralph Arthur Roberts as Holenius, Antique dealer
- Sybille Schmitz as Britta Geistenberg
- Henry Lorenzen as von Schlieff
- Oskar Sima as Sigorski
- Erika Glässner as Yvonne de Carmagnac
- Georges Boulanger as a violinist
- Maria Meissner as Miss Oppmann
- Josef Sieber as Chauffeur
- Ekkehard Arendt as waiter at the golf club
- Ernst Behmer as lifeguard
- Hermann Braun as caddy at the golf club
- Louis Brody as barkeeper
- Adolf Fischer as truck driver
- Illo Gutschwager as boy at the gas station
- Bruno Hübner as bridge-player
- Karl Jüstel as Hotel guest
- Alfred Karen as Hotel guest
- Paquita Lorenz as saleswoman
- Edith Oß as maid
- Bert Schmidt-Moris as bell boy
- Aida St. Paul as bridge-player
- Egon Stief as truck driver
- Elisabeth von Ruets as bridge-player
- Erich Walter as Markoff
- Hugo Werner-Kahle as Van der Meuleen

== Bibliography ==
- Klaus, Ulrich J. Deutsche Tonfilme: Jahrgang 1934. Klaus-Archiv, 1988.
- Rentschler, Eric. The Ministry of Illusion: Nazi Cinema and Its Afterlife. Harvard University Press, 1996.
- Waldman, Harry. Nazi Films in America, 1933–1942. McFarland, 2008.
