= Tell Me Who You Are (1933 film) =

1933 film

- Austrian poster
- German: Sag' mir, wer Du bist
- Directed by: Georg Jacoby
- Written by: Max Bertuch (play); Hanns Dekner (play); Albrecht Haselbach (play); Walter Schlee; Walter Wassermann
- Starring: Liane Haid; Viktor de Kowa; Olly Gebauer
- Cinematography: Ewald Daub; Reimar Kuntze
- Music by: Franz Grothe
- Production company: Tobis Film
- Distributed by: Tobis Film; Kiba Filmverleih (Austria)
- Release date: 15 May 1933
- Running time: 80 minutes
- Country: Germany
- Language: German

Tell Me Who You Are (German: Sag' mir, wer Du bist) is a 1933 German comedy film directed by Georg Jacoby and starring Liane Haid, Viktor de Kowa and Olly Gebauer.

== Cast ==
- Liane Haid as Gilda Garden
- Viktor de Kowa as Frank Hesse
- Olly Gebauer as Lilo Lanner
- Fritz Schulz as Dr. Claudius Berger
- Otto Wallburg as Harry Reimers
- Paul Otto as Peter Schröder
- Paul Biensfeldt as theatre porter
- Gertrud Wolle as Mrs. Schloderer
- Senta Söneland as Dr. Claudius Berger's landlady
- Emilie Kurz as Harry Reims's aunt
- Gerhard Dammann as theatre servant
- Bruno Arno as dancer
