= Rosy Barsony =

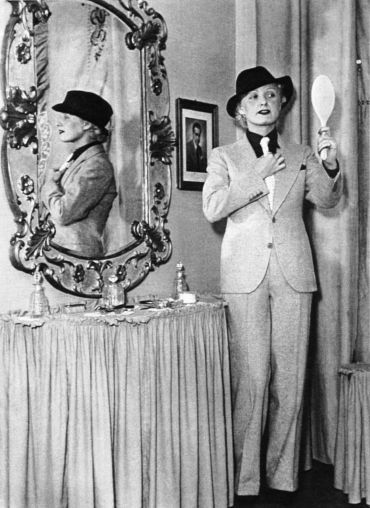
- Rosy Barsony in 1934
- Born: 5 June 1909; Budapest, Austria-Hungary
- Died: 23 March 1977 (aged 67); Vienna, Austria
- Other name: Rózsi Bársony-Sonnenschein
- Occupations: Actress; singer; dancer
- Years active: 1929–1957 (film)

Rosy Barsony (5 June 1909 – 23 March 1977) was a Hungarian-born dancer, singer and film actress.

Rosy was born Róza Sonnenschein on 5 June 1909 in Budapest. She was a child performer and became a leading operetta soubrette. She began a film career in 1929, and in 1931 she moved to Berlin. Her career flourished: she became the leading lady in the operettas of Paul Abraham and married fellow performer Oskar Dénes.

As a Jewish woman, she left Germany in 1935, touring in Italy, England and Romania, before returning to Budapest. From 1948, she settled in Vienna, appearing on television as well as on stage at the Stadttheater Klagenfurt and the Seefestspielen Mörbisch.

She died in Vienna on 23 March 1977 and is buried at the Döblinger Cemetery.

== Selected filmography ==
- The Old Scoundrel (1932)
- A Mad Idea (1932)
- A Bit of Love (1932)
- And the Plains Are Gleaming (1933)
- Love Must Be Understood (1933)
- Waltz War (1933)
- Leap into Bliss (1934)
- Hello, Budapest! (1935)
- Ball at the Savoy (1935)
- Viki (1937)
- Roxy and the Wonderteam (1938)

== Bibliography ==
- Robert von Dassanowsky. Austrian Cinema: A History. McFarland, 2005.
