= Emma Palladino =

Italian ballet dancer (1861–1922)

Emma Amalia Virginia Palladino (1861 – 13 April 1922) was an Italian ballet dancer who for seven years was the prima ballerina at the Alhambra Theatre in London where she danced to the ballet music of the theatre's resident composer and conductor Georges Jacobi.

== Early life ==
Born in 1861 in Milan in Italy the daughter of Andrea Palladini, a dancer at the Teatro alla Scala who chose to change his surname. She trained at La Scala Theatre Ballet in Milan and from 1873 to 1876 danced in the same theatre, first as a pupil of the school in choreography by Antonio Pallerini including Le due twelle (1873), The Seven Deadly Sins (1873) and in Ferdinando Pratesi's La temptation (1874) before taking on larger roles.

== Dancing career ==
In 1877 she moved to the United States where she made her début in New York in Offenbach's operetta Le voyage dans la lune while in 1878 she performed in the ballet Le papillon, staged by the Mapleson Opera Troupe in New York City. In the late 1870s she returned to Europe and settled in London where she built a brilliant career as "a petite and fascinating, graceful dancer". She performed at Her Majesty's Theatre in 1879 and at the Theatre Royal, Drury Lane from 1881 to 1887 where she danced in opera ballet. For seven years Palladino was the prima ballerina at the Alhambra Theatre in London under the baton of Georges Jacobi in a ballet choreographed by the Italian Carlo Coppi. After making her début in Endymion she played, among others, the title roles in Nina (1885) and Nadia (1887) by Joseph Hansen. From 1888 to 1893 she danced at the Empire Theatre of Varieties in Leicester Square where she danced in Katti Lanner's Diana (1888), a performance which earned her the nickname "the Complete Palladino"; A Dream of Wealth (1889), Dolly (1890), Nisita (1891), and By the Sea (1891).

== Later years ==
In the summer seasons of 1889 and 1890 Palladino performed at the Royal Opera House in Covent Garden as the principal dancer in some operatic repertoire titles, while in 1895 she interpreted Pastoralea to choreography by Léon Espinosa at the Palace Theatre in Manchester. In 1894 she attempted to launch a singing career - with modest results - at the Manchester Palace of Varieties. She also worked in Paris in the newly built Éden-Théâtre, in Moscow and St. Petersburg during a tour with the Alhambra Theatre company in 1886, in Berlin and finally in Munich, as well as in Italy.

In 1899 she played in Messalina by Luigi Danesi and in Rodope by Raffaele Grassi. She married bookkeeper Arthur Roger Carter in London in 1901.

Emma Palladino retired in 1899 and died in Hampstead in London in 1922. In her will she left £3,405 15s 10d to her husband.
