= Wild Cattle (film) =

1934 film

- Directed by: António Lopes Ribeiro; Max Nosseck
- Written by: Arnold Lippschitz
- Produced by: Francisco Correia de Matos
- Starring: Nita Brandao; Olly Gebauer; Mariana Alves; Sig Arno
- Cinematography: Heinrich Gartner; José Nunes das Neves
- Edited by: Erich Palme
- Music by: Luís de Freitas Branco; Hans May
- Production company: Bloco H. da Costa
- Release date: 8 August 1934
- Running time: 115 minutes
- Country: Portugal
- Language: Portuguese

Wild Cattle (Portuguese: Gado Bravo) is a 1934 Portuguese romantic comedy film directed by António Lopes Ribeiro and Max Nosseck and starring Nita Brandao, Olly Gebauer and Mariana Alves. A number of those employed on the film were exiles from Nazi Germany. The film's sets were designed by the art director Herbert Lippschitz.

== Cast ==
- Nita Brandao as Branca
- Olly Gebauer as Nina
- Mariana Alves as Mariana
- Raul de Carvalho as Manuel Garrido
- Arthur Duarte as Arthur Fernandes
- Sig Arno as Jackson
- Alberto Reis as Pascoal
- Armando Machado as Joaquim
- José Santos as Taberneiro
- Falcau
- Baltasar de Azevedo
- António Silva

== Bibliography ==
- Vieira, Patricia. Portuguese Film, 1930-1960,: The Staging of the New State Regime. A&C Black, 2013.
