= Men Behind Bars =

1931 film

- German: Menschen hinter Gittern
- Directed by: Pál Fejös
- Written by: E. W. Brandes; Walter Hasenclever; Frances Marion; Ernst Toller
- Produced by: Irving Thalberg
- Starring: Heinrich George; Gustav Diessl; Egon von Jordan
- Cinematography: J. Peverell Marley; Harold Wenstrom
- Edited by: Blanche Sewell
- Production company: Cosmopolitan Productions
- Distributed by: Metro-Goldwyn-Mayer
- Release date: June 24, 1931
- Running time: 109 minutes
- Country: United States
- Language: German

Men Behind Bars (German: Menschen hinter Gittern) is a 1931 German-language American Pre-Code drama film directed by Pál Fejös and starring Heinrich George, Gustav Diessl and Egon von Jordan. It is the German language version of MGM's The Big House. In the early years of sound before dubbing became widespread, it was common to make films in multiple languages. It premiered in Berlin on June 24, 1931.

== Synopsis ==
The convicts in an overcrowded American prison plot to rise up and stage a massive jailbreak.

== Cast ==
- Heinrich George as Butch
- Gustav Diessl as Morris
- Egon von Jordan as Kent Marlow
- Anton Pointner as Supervisor Wallace
- Dita Parlo as Annie Marlow
- Paul Morgan as Putnam
- Herman Bing as lawyer
- Peter Erkelenz as Der Gefängnisdirektor
- Karl Etlinger as Gefängniswärter
- Adolf E. Licho as Annie's father
- Hans Heinrich von Twardowski as Oliver
