= Mother and Child (1934 film) =

1934 film directed by Hans Steinhoff

- German: Mutter und Kind
- Directed by: Hans Steinhoff
- Written by: Friedrich Hebbel (poem); Robert A. Stemmle
- Produced by: Guido Bagier
- Starring: Henny Porten; Peter Voß; Elisabeth Wendt; Wolfgang Keppler
- Cinematography: Karl Puth
- Edited by: Ludolf Grisebach
- Music by: Richard Ralf
- Production company: Tofa-Film
- Release date: 4 January 1934
- Running time: 121 minutes
- Country: Germany
- Language: German

Mother and Child (German: Mutter und Kind) is a 1934 German drama film directed by Hans Steinhoff and starring Henny Porten, Peter Voß, and Elisabeth Wendt. It is a sound remake of the 1924 silent film Mother and Child which had been a major hit for Porten. Franz Schroedter worked as art director on the film.

== Cast ==
- Henny Porten as Anna
- Peter Voß as Jürgen
- Elisabeth Wendt as Frau Petersen
- Wolfgang Keppler as Herr Petersen
- Hansi Arnstaedt as Frau Kröger
- Werner Pledath as Dr. Fiedler
- Paul Westermeier as Larsen, master carpenter
- Luise Morland as Frau Larsen
- Dörte Kühne as Fiete Larsen
- Alexandra Schmitt as grandmother Larsen
- Fita Benkhoff as Frau Hellinger
- Walter Steinbeck as Herr Hellinger
- Hermann Picha as Rippe, country postman
- Ilse Nast as Petersen's wife
- Bruno Ziener as Petersen's servant
