= An Enemy of the People (1937 film) =

1937 film directed by Hans Steinhoff

- Directed by: Hans Steinhoff
- Written by: Erich Ebermayer; Hans Steinhoff
- Based on: An Enemy of the People by Henrik Ibsen
- Produced by: Otto Lehmann; Hans von Wolzogen
- Starring: Heinrich George; Herbert Hübner; Franziska Kinz; Carsta Löck
- Cinematography: Karl Puth
- Edited by: Gertrud Hinz-Nischwitz
- Music by: Clemens Schmalstich
- Production company: Fabrikation Deutscher Filme
- Distributed by: Terra Film
- Release date: 26 October 1937
- Running time: 102 minutes
- Country: Germany
- Language: German

An Enemy of the People (German: Ein Volksfeind) is a 1937 German drama film directed by Hans Steinhoff and starring Heinrich George, Herbert Hübner, Franziska Kinz and Carsta Löck. The film is an adaptation of the 1882 play of the same title by the Norwegian writer Henrik Ibsen. It was shot at the Tempelhof Studios in Berlin and on location around Glücksburg and the Flensburg Fjord in Schleswig-Holstein. The film's sets were designed by the art directors Karl Haacker and Hermann Warm. It updates the setting of the story from Norway in the 1880s to pre-Nazi Germany in the 1930s.

== Synopsis ==
In a small German spa town of Bad Trimburg towards the end of the Weimar Republic Doctor Hans Stockmann discovers that the local medicinal springs, the lifeblood of his town's economy, are dangerously contaminated. When he attempts to go public his own brother, the mayor, leads the community in a fierce campaign to suppress the truth to protect their profits. Abandoned by the local press and fellow townspeople, the doctor is branded a "Volksfeind" (enemy of the people) during a chaotic town meeting. Despite the social ruin and threats to his family, Stockmann remains defiant, choosing his principles over the corrupt interests of the majority.

== Cast ==
- Heinrich George as Dr, Hans Stockmann
- Herbert Hübner as Bürgermeister Stockmann
- Franziska Kinz as Johanna Stockmann
- Carsta Löck as Lehrerin Petra
- Hans Richter as Walter Stockmann
- Eberhard Bartke as Frederik Stockmann
- Albert Florath as Worse
- Fritz Genschow as Kapitän Holster
- Heinz von Cleve as Redakteur Hofstetten
- Hubert von Meyerinck as Redakteur Fink
- Hans Hermann Schaufuß as Zeitungsbesitzer Dornbach
- Claire Reigbert as Frau Kettler
- Walter Werner as Medizinalrat Dr. Kettler
- Ernst Fritz Fürbringer as Ministerialrat
- Georg H. Schnell as Ministerialdirektor Prof. Köster
- Ernst Legal as Baumeister
- Karl Etlinger as Apotheker
- Ernst Rotmund as Hotelier
- Erich Dunskus as Schlachtermeister
- Eduard Wenck as Bäckermeister
- Bruno Harprecht as Schuldirektor Knittel
- Bernhard Minetti as Minister
- Eduard Bornträger as Schulprofessor
- Werner Pledath as Schulprofessor
- Helmut Bautzmann as 1. Arbeiter
- Adolf Fischer as 2. Arbeiter
- Olga Limburg as Patientin bei Dr. Stockmann
- Bruno Ziener as Bürovorsteher Weber
- Klaus Pohl as Teilnehmer
- Gerhard Dammann as Teilnehmer
- Aribert Grimmer as Ein Verwalter
- Michael von Newlinsky as Aufrührer

== Bibliography ==
- Giesen, Rolf. Nazi Propaganda Films: A History and Filmography. McFarland & Company, 2003.
- Klaus, Ulrich J. Deutsche Tonfilme: Jahrgang 1937. Klaus-Archiv, 1988.
- Waldman, Harry. Nazi Films in America, 1933-1942. McFarland, 2008.
