= Anny Ahlers =

German actress and singer (1902–1933)

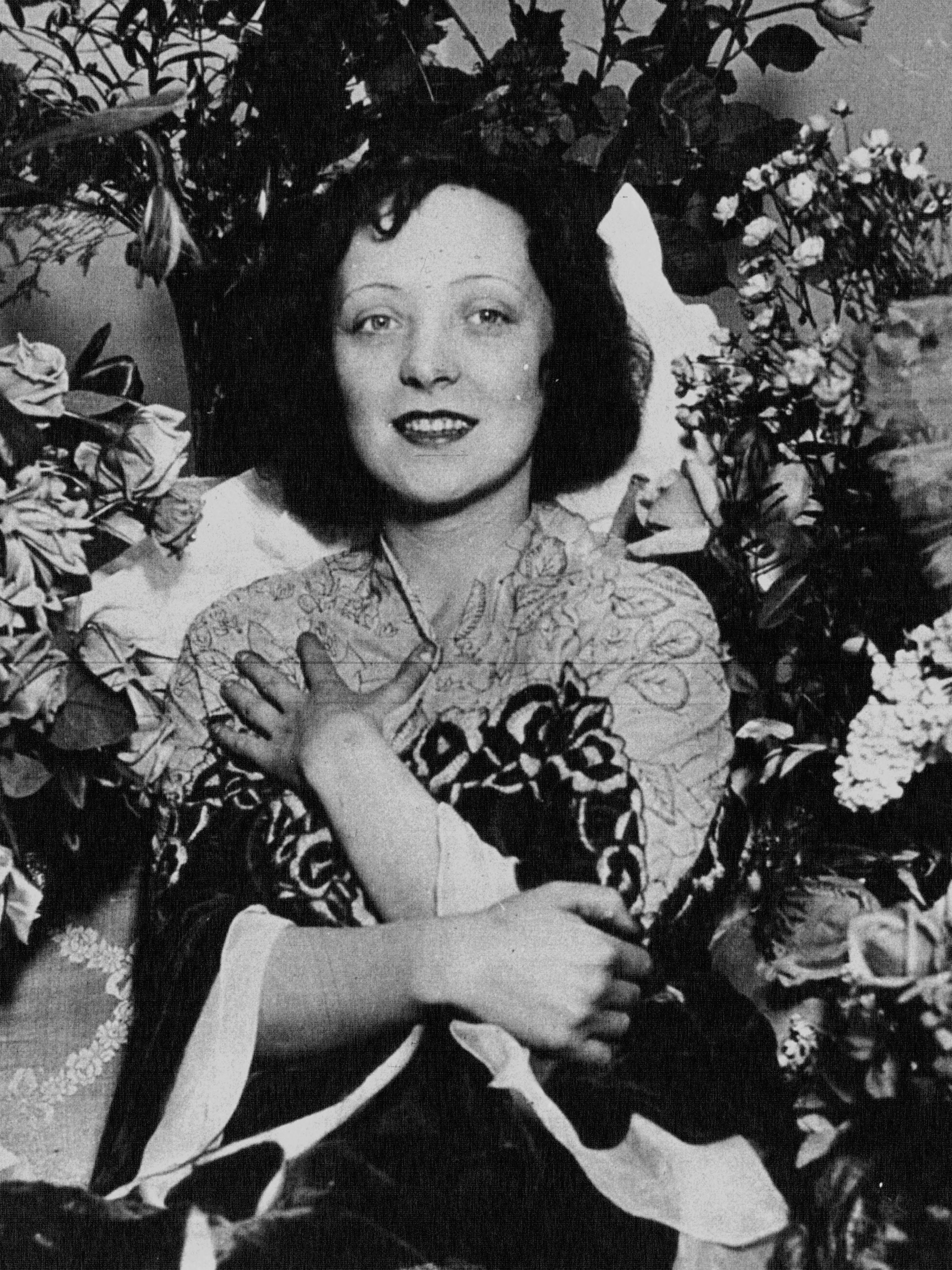
- Anny Ahlers in 1932, taken one year before her death
- Born: 21 December 1907; Hamburg, German Empire
- Died: 14 March 1933 (aged 25); London, England
- Occupations: Actress, singer

Anny Ahlers (21 December 1907 – 14 March 1933) was a German actress and singer. She was born in Hamburg.

== Career ==
She was born to Wilhelm Ahlers and his wife Augusta Victoria (Lieberg). Her father was an Army officer and her maternal grandmother was English. Ahlers began her career at the age of four, appearing as a dancer in circus acts. At seven she studied at the Operatic School of Dancing in Hamburg. Her breakthrough role was in the operetta Casanova, composed by Ralph Benatzky. This role established her popularity in Berlin.

In December 1931, she appeared with Richard Tauber in an operetta by Erich Wolfgang Korngold at the Admiralspalast in Berlin. This was called 'Das Lied der Liebe' and was based on the Johann Strauss operetta Das Spitzentuch der Königin. [ref: Daniel O'Hara, Richard Tauber: A new Chronology, Saltburn, 2013]. This ran until March 1932, after which she went to London, England to appear with Heddle Nash in the operetta The Dubarry at Her Majesty's Theatre [Ref: Eleanor Allen, Heddle Nash: Singing against the Tide, Jubilee House, London, 2010.

On 14 March 1933, while appearing in London, she died in controversial circumstances after jumping out her flat window in an apparent suicide. Her death has been blamed both on morphine that she had taken while suffering from tuberculosis, and on sleeping pills she was taking due to insomnia. Her replacement in the role, Kathlyn Hilliard, also died in 1933.

== Filmography ==
- Casanova (1928)
- Madame Pompadour (1931) - Die Marquise von Pompadour
- Die Faschingsfee (1931) - Alexandra
- The True Jacob (1931) - Yvette
- Kabarett-Programm Nr. 5 (1931, short)
- Die Liebesfiliale (1931) - Madame Irene
- The Company's in Love (1932) - Peggy Barling
