= A Mad Idea =

1932 film

- Directed by: Kurt Gerron
- Written by: Philipp Lothar Mayring; Fritz Zeckendorf
- Based on: A Mad Idea by Carl Laufs
- Produced by: Bruno Duday
- Starring: Willy Fritsch; Dorothea Wieck; Rosy Barsony
- Cinematography: Werner Bohne; Konstantin Irmen-Tschet
- Edited by: Constantin Mick
- Music by: Walter Jurmann; Bronislau Kaper
- Production company: UFA
- Distributed by: UFA
- Release date: 13 May 1932
- Running time: 87 minutes
- Country: Germany
- Language: German

A Mad Idea or A Crazy Idea (German: Ein toller Einfall) is a 1932 German comedy film directed by Kurt Gerron and starring Willy Fritsch, Dorothea Wieck and Rosy Barsony. It was made by UFA, Germany's biggest studio. It was shot at the Babelsberg Studios in Berlin. The film's art direction was by Julius von Borsody. Location shooting took place around St. Moritz in Switzerland. It is based on the 1887 play A Mad Idea by Carl Laufs.

== Synopsis ==
Penniless Munich-based painter Paul Lüders goes to stay at his uncle's castle in the Swiss Alps. His equally impoverished uncle has gone to England in order to try and sell the property to wealthy Mr. Miller. A series of misunderstandings lead to Paul renting out the various rooms as if it were a hotel, including a large booking by the Miller Girls, a dance troupe led by impresario Theo Müller. Further confusion arises when Paul mistakes Müller's daughter Evelyn for the daughter of the wealthy Englishman. The real daughter, Mabel, also turns up, as does Paul's ex-girlfriend Anita. Despite the mix-ups, the hotel is now so successful that his uncle abandons the idea of selling it.

== Cast ==
- Willy Fritsch as Paul Lüders
- Dorothea Wieck as Mabel Miller
- Rosy Barsony as Anita
- Max Adalbert as Birnstiel
- Jakob Tiedtke as Michael Lüders
- Harry Halm as Bob
- Heinz Salfner as Herr Miller
- Leo Slezak as Theo Müller, Manager der Miller Girls
- Ellen Schwanneke as Evelyn Müller
- Wilhelm Bendow as Wendolin
- Fritz Odemar as Werner Schubart
- Genia Nikolaieva as Marga Schubart
- Gerda Bunnemann
- Aenne Goerling as Minna
- Paul Hörbiger as Emil
- Ferdinand Hart
- Theo Lingen as Oberkellner
- Adele Sandrock as Mieterin
- Oskar Sima as Steuer-Inspektor
- Leopoldine Konstantin
- Klaus Pohl as Schneider
- Gustav Waldau

== Bibliography ==
- Waldman, Harry (2008). Nazi Films in America, 1933–1942. McFarland. ISBN 978-0-7864-3861-7.
