= Max Nosseck =

German film director, actor, and screenwriter

- Born: 19 September 1902; Nakel, Posen, German Empire
- Died: 29 September 1972 (aged 70); Bad Wiessee, Bavaria, West Germany
- Occupations: Director, screenwriter, actor
- Years active: 1926–1972 (film)

Max Nosseck (1902 – 1972) was a German film director, actor and screenwriter. Having entered the German film industry during the Weimar Republic he was forced into exile from Nazi Germany. He worked in a variety of countries the next few years before settling in Hollywood.

== Biography ==
Nosseck was born in Nakel, then in Prussia, but now in Poland. Nosseck established himself as a director in the German Film Industry, but due to his Jewish background he was forced to emigrate following the Nazi takeover in 1933. He directed films in France, Spain, the Netherlands, and United States.

In 1934 Max Nosseck directed Buster Keaton, then struggling with alcoholism and a messy divorce, in the French feature Le Roi des Champs-Élysées.

Nosseck's American films typed him as a director of sensationalist subjects, usually juvenile-vagrancy melodramas. His most famous "exploitation" film is Dillinger (1945), a gangster picture chronicling the rise and fall of John Dillinger. The film starred Lawrence Tierney, with whom Nosseck reunited for two crime thrillers in later years. In a surprising turnabout, Nosseck directed two wholesome animal adventures in 1946 and 1947.

He was an interesting character (only 5'3" and a lisp) with a quick temper. Legend in Hollywood is that he refused to be controlled by one of the heads of a major studio who was about to give him his own film to direct and was forced to return to Europe. He attended many European film festivals.

After his American assignments, he returned to work in the German and Austrian film industries. Nosseck married three times: to Austrian actress Olly Gebauer, to German actress Ilse Steppat, and to the writer and aviator Genevieve Haugen.

He died in Bad Wiessee.

== Selected filmography ==
=== Director ===
- Liebeskleeblatt (1930)
- Dance Into Happiness (1930)
- The Schlemihl (1931)
- For Once I'd Like to Have No Troubles (1932)
- All Is at Stake (1932)
- Wild Cattle (1934)
- Una semana de felicidad (1934)
- Le Roi des Champs-Élysées (1934)
- De Big van het Regiment (1935)
- Aventura oriental (1935)
- Oranje Hein (1936)
- Poderoso caballero (1936)
- Overture to Glory (1940)
- Girls Under 21 (1940)
- Gambling Daughters (1941)
- Dillinger (1945)
- The Brighton Strangler (1945)
- Black Beauty (1946)
- The Return of Rin Tin Tin (1947)
- Kill or Be Killed (1950)
- Korea Patrol (1951)
- The Hoodlum (1951)
- Garden of Eden (1954)
- The Captain and His Hero (1955)
- And Who Is Kissing Me? (1956)
- Singing in the Dark (1956)

=== Screenwriter ===
- Munchhausen in Africa (1958)

=== Actor ===
- Derby (1926)
- Liebeskleeblatt (1930)
- Dance Into Happiness (1930)
- Sperrbezirk (1966)
- How Did a Nice Girl Like You Get Into This Business? (1970)
- Gentlemen in White Vests (1970)
