= Heinz Hille =

German screenwriter, film producer and director

- Born: 1891; German Empire
- Died: 15 May 1954 (aged 62–63); Düsseldorf, West Germany
- Occupations: Producer, Director, Writer
- Years active: 1931–1940 (film)

Heinz Hille (1891 – 15 May 1954) was a German screenwriter, film producer and director.

== Selected filmography ==
- You Will Be My Wife (1932)
- The Old Scoundrel (1932)
- The Cheeky Devil (1932)
- And the Plains Are Gleaming (1933)
- Dream Love (1935)
- Dreams of Love (1935)
- Autobus S (1937)
- Falstaff in Vienna (1940)

== Bibliography ==
- Cunningham, John. Hungarian Cinema: From Coffee House to Multiplex. Wallflower Press, 2004.
