= Károly Sugar =

Hungarian actor

Károly Sugár
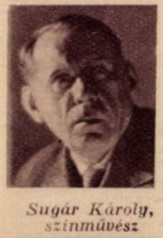
- Born: 2 November 1882; Budapest, Austria-Hungary
- Died: 30 July 1936 (aged 53); Budapest, Hungary
- Occupation: Actor
- Years active: 1920-1933 (film)

Károly Sugár (1882–1936) was a Hungarian stage and film actor. Most of his career was spent in the theatre, but he also appeared in five films.

== Selected filmography ==
- The Old Scoundrel (1932)
- And the Plains Are Gleaming (1933)

== Bibliography ==
- Rachel A. Schildgen. More Than a Dream: Rediscovering the Life and Films of Vilma Banky. 1921 PVG Publishing, 2010.
