= Autobus S =

1937 film

- Directed by: Heinz Hille
- Written by: Harald Baumgarten (novel); Hanns H. Fischer; Ernst Hasselbach; Per Schwenzen
- Starring: Hermann Speelmans; Carsta Löck; Günther Lüders
- Cinematography: Edgar S. Ziesemer
- Music by: Ernst Erich Buder
- Production company: Aco-Film
- Distributed by: N.A.G. Filmverleih
- Release date: 12 October 1937
- Running time: 85 minutes
- Country: Germany
- Language: German

Autobus S is a 1937 German comedy film directed by Heinz Hille and starring Hermann Speelmans, Carsta Löck, and Günther Lüders.

== Cast ==
- Hermann Speelmans as Jonny Sülken
- Carsta Löck as Grete
- Günther Lüders as Gustav Bauer
- Paul Westermeier as Jule Pelsch, Wirt
- Otto Wernicke as 'Kapitän' Kröker
- Toni von Bukovics
- Werner Finck as Der 'schöne Willy'
- Margit Symo as Rita
- Rudolf Platte as Oschi, Klavierspieler
- Flita von Uhl
- Walter Steinbeck
- Gerhard Dammann
- Hermann Pfeiffer
- Otto Matthies
- Wilhelm P. Krüger

== Bibliography ==
- Moeller, Felix; Schlöndorff, Volker (2000). The Film Minister: Goebbels and the Cinema in the Third Reich. Translated by Robinson, Michael. Stuttgart: Axel Menges. ISBN 978-3-932565-10-6.
