= George W. Byng =

English composer and conductor (1861–1932)

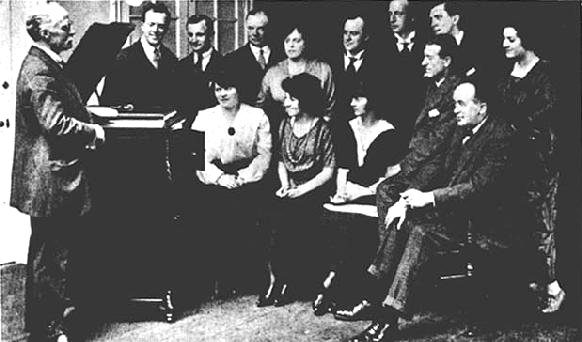
George W. Byng (standing, far left) at a recording session for The Pirates of Penzance in 1920 (Note: The singers, from left to right, were: Seated: Bessie Jones, Violet Essex, Sarah Jones, Harold Wilde, Robert Radford; Standing: Derek Oldham, Walter Glynne, Ernest Pike, Edna Thornton, Peter Dawson, Edward Halland, George Baker and Nellie Walker.)

George Wilford Bulkley Byng (1861 – 29 June 1932) was an English conductor, composer, music arranger and musical director of the late 19th and early 20th centuries. He is known for composing music for ballet productions staged at the Alhambra Theatre in London during the Edwardian era, for his theatre compositions, and as a conductor for His Master's Voice (HMV) from World War I up to about 1930. Byng was his stage name.

As a child, he received a musical education and at age 11 joined the orchestra at the Theatre Royal, Dublin, and played in orchestras throughout Britain for two decades before beginning a conducting career. By the 1890s, his compositions of incidental music for plays were used in London theatres. From 1898 to 1913, as the musical director of London's Alhambra Theatre, he composed, arranged and conducted the music for approximately 30 ballets and scenas. During this period, he continued to compose new music, including theatre scores, for other companies. For two years thereafter, he was the musical conductor at the Gaiety Theatre, London.

After conducting for Thomas Edison's British recording studio for several years, in 1915 Byng joined HMV full-time, where he conducted a great number of recordings. From 1917 to 1924, he conducted many of the early acoustic sets of the Gilbert and Sullivan operas in cooperation with the D'Oyly Carte Opera Company. He remained with HMV for at least 15 years.

== Early years and marriage ==
Byng was born in Whitehaven, Cumberland, the son of David Bulkley and Jane Benn. The family moved to Dublin around 1865, where David was employed as a comedian. At the age of seven Byng entered the Royal Irish Academy of Music in Dublin. Four years later he joined the orchestra at the Theatre Royal, Dublin, of which he remained a member for six years, playing the violin. Later engagements in orchestras were at the Gaiety Theatre, Dublin; the Theatre Royal, Edinburgh; the Prince's Theatre, Manchester; and, in London, the Gaiety, the Shaftesbury and the Royalty. For three years he was sub-conductor in London at the Empire, Leicester Square, before being appointed musical director at the Prince of Wales Theatre. He composed incidental music for the play Six Persons, which was staged at the Haymarket Theatre in London in the 1893–94 season. Together with A. McLean and Reginald Somerville he composed the score for the musical farce, The White Silk Dress, which opened at The Prince of Wales's Theatre in 1896, starring Decima Moore and Arthur Roberts.

Byng married Alice Louisa Ford (1862–1913) in 1885, and with her had two sons: Wilford Lancaster Bulkley Byng (1886–1951) and David George Bulkley Byng (1897–1978). In 1911 his wife petitioned for divorce, claiming he had committed adultery with her sister and subsequently deserted his family. Her petition of adultery was dismissed, but that for desertion allowed.

== Musical director and composer ==
In 1898 Byng succeeded Georges Jacobi as musical director of the Alhambra Theatre in London. The Alhambra maintained a large corps de ballet and engaged well known choreographers. The music was generally arranged by the theatre's musical director. Byng composed, arranged and conducted the music for approximately 30 ballets and scenas. For example, at the Alhambra, his ballet with songs, Napoli, choreographed by Giovanni Pratesi, was positively reviewed in 1899, and likewise, the following year, his ballet with songs The Gay City, with Charles Wilson. Carmen was one of the popular ballets produced at this theatre, and Byng's music was used in two different versions: in 1903 with choreography by Lucia Cormani, music by Georges Bizet and Byng; and in 1912 with choreography by Augustin Berger, music by Bizet, Byng and George Clutsam. Also in 1912, Byng constructed a score for The Guide to Paris, an updated version of La Vie parisienne with words by George Grossmith, Jr.; Byng included music from other Offenbach scores, including La belle Hélène, Madame Favart and Barbe-bleue.

Byng listed his principal compositions as Jack Ashore, Inspiration, Gretna-Green, Santa Claus, The Devil's Forge, On the Heath, Our Flag and H.M.S. Irresponsible. The last was a musical play by J F Cornish, which was staged on Broadway in 1900 before opening at the Strand Theatre in May 1901. Byng composed music for several other stage shows, including The Variety Girl (1902), The Belle of the Baltic, Guy Fawkes, The Duchess of Sillie Crankie (1904), and The Mad Pierrot (1911). His other songs and compositions include "Cupid Wins", "The Two Flags", "Paquita", "The Polar Star", "Femina", "On the Sands", "My sword and I" (sung by Peter Dawson), "My Heart and I" (duet) and an orchestral suite: A Day in Naples (Note: The tarantella from A Day in Naples was recorded in 1945 by Jay Wilbur and the New Concert Orchestra; the recording was reissued on CD in 2011.)

In 1913 he left the Alhambra and was appointed conductor at the Gaiety Theatre, London, in succession to Leopold Wenzel. He also conducted light/dance orchestras, for example the Queen's Hall Light Orchestra and the Mayfair Orchestra.

== His Master's Voice ==
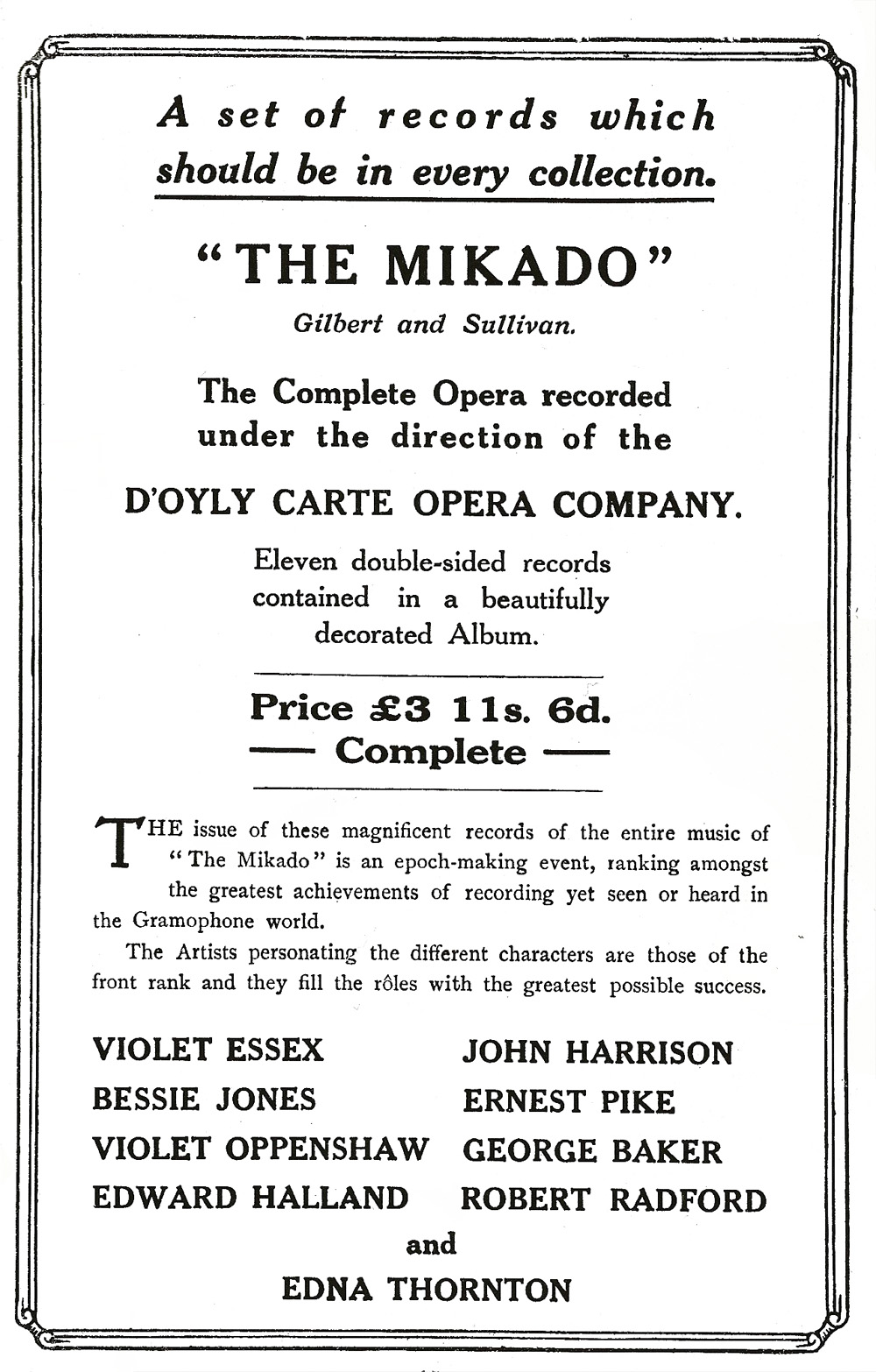
HMV advertisement for Byng's 1917 recording of The Mikado

Byng first conducted for recordings at Thomas Edison's London studios from 1909 until they closed in 1914. In 1915 Byng became staff conductor for His Master's Voice (HMV) and conducted a great number of recordings made at their recording studios in Hayes, Middlesex. These featured many well-known artists of the time, for example the singers Elisabeth Schumann, Feodor Chaliapin, Peter Dawson, the Black Diamonds (Brass) Band and the Mayfair Dance Orchestra.

During and after the First World War Byng was one of the conductors, along with Arthur Wood and Harry Norris, who worked on the HMV project to record the Gilbert and Sullivan comic operas. This was an extensive undertaking, under the direction of Rupert D'Oyly Carte, proprietor of the D'Oyly Carte Opera Company. The Gilbert and Sullivan operas Byng conducted for HMV were The Mikado (1917), (Note: Part conducted by Byng and part by Wood.) The Yeomen of the Guard (1920), The Pirates of Penzance (1920), Patience (1921), Iolanthe (1922), (Note: Part conducted by Byng and part by Norris.) H.M.S Pinafore (1922) and Princess Ida, 1924.

In 1930 Byng was both arranger and conductor of a series of children's records and other music for light orchestra recorded by HMV in one of the studios at the Small Queen's Hall in London.

== Death ==
Although still working for HMV until at least 1930, during 1931 or 1932 he was admitted to the asylum at "Northwoods House" in Frampton Cotterell, Gloucestershire. On 29 June 1932, he died there as a result of self-inflicted wounds to his throat, aged 71.

== Notes, references and sources ==
=== Sources ===
- Rollins, Cyril; R. John Witts (1961). The D'Oyly Carte Opera Company in Gilbert and Sullivan Operas. London: Michael Joseph, Ltd. OCLC 1317843.
- Parker, John (1916). Who's Who in the Theatre (third ed.). London: Sir Isaac Pitman and Sons. OCLC 39607786.
- Parker, John (1925). Who's Who in the Theatre (fifth ed.). London: Sir Isaac Pitman and Sons. OCLC 10013159.
