= Hansi Arnstaedt =

German actress (1878–1945)

- Born: 8 December 1878; Dresden, German Empire
- Died: 8 May 1945 (aged 66); Berlin, Germany
- Other name: Hansi Arnstadt
- Occupation: Actress
- Years active: 1913–1943 (film)

Hansi Arnstaedt (8 December 1878 – 8 May 1945) was a German film actress.

Her role subject was that of the frisky and naive, later she was seen in character roles. In 1913, she was given the role of the title character in Franz Porten's three-part film biography about Queen Luise. After that, she did not appear in films again until 1930. Mostly she was now a supporting actress, sometimes, as in 1940 in Lauter Liebe as the mother of Hertha Feiler, she took on larger roles. She was on the Gottbegnadeten list of the Reich Ministry for Popular Enlightenment and Propaganda in 1944.

== Selected filmography ==
- Dolly Gets Ahead (1930)
- A Thousand Words of German (1930)
- Three Days of Love (1931)
- Such a Greyhound (1931)
- Errant Husbands (1931)
- The True Jacob (1931)
- I'll Stay with You (1931)
- The Beggar Student (1931)
- The Mad Bomberg (1932)
- Grandstand for General Staff (1932)
- And the Plains Are Gleaming (1933)
- The Little Crook (1933)
- Love Must Be Understood (1933)
- Two Good Comrades (1933)
- Mother and Child (1934)
- Intermezzo (1936)
- The Divine Jetta (1937)
- The Roundabouts of Handsome Karl (1938)
- The Girl of Last Night (1938)
- The Secret Lie (1938)
- Hurrah! I'm a Father (1939)
- Woman Without a Past (1939)

== Bibliography ==
- Capua, Michelangelo (2015). Anatole Litvak: The Life and Films. Jefferson, NC: McFarland. ISBN 978-1-4766-1870-8.
