= You Will Be My Wife =

- French: Vous serez ma femme
- Directed by: Carl Boese; Heinz Hille; Serge de Poligny
- Written by: Fritz Falkenstein; Paul Frank; Louis Verneuil (play); Irma von Cube
- Starring: Alice Field; Roger Tréville; Lucien Baroux
- Cinematography: Werner Bohne; Konstantin Irmen-Tschet
- Edited by: Erno Hajos
- Music by: Hans-Otto Borgmann; Stephan Samek
- Production company: UFA
- Distributed by: UFA
- Release date: 20 May 1932
- Running time: 91 minutes
- Country: Germany
- Language: French

You Will Be My Wife (French: Vous serez ma femme) is a 1932 German comedy film directed by Carl Boese, Serge de Poligny and Heinz Hille and starring Alice Field, Roger Tréville and Lucien Baroux. It is the French-language version of UFA's The Cheeky Devil.

The film's sets were designed by the art directors Willi Herrmann and Herbert Lippschitz.

== Cast ==
- Alice Field as Alice Ménard
- Roger Tréville as Le jeune homme
- Lucien Baroux as Gustave Ménard
- Lucien Callamand as Le portier
- Paulette Dubost as Annette
- Jane Pierson as La mère de Loulou
- Janine Ronceray as Loulou Gazelle
- Pierre Sergeol as Henri Latour
