= Alhambra Theatre =

Former theatre in London, United Kingdom

- 1854 Royal Panopticon; 1858 Alhambra Circus; 1864 Alhambra Music Hall; 1884 Alhambra Theatre; Also: Royal Alhambra Palace; Alhambra Theatre of Varieties; Theatre Royal, Alhambra; Great United States Circus and New Alhambra Theatre
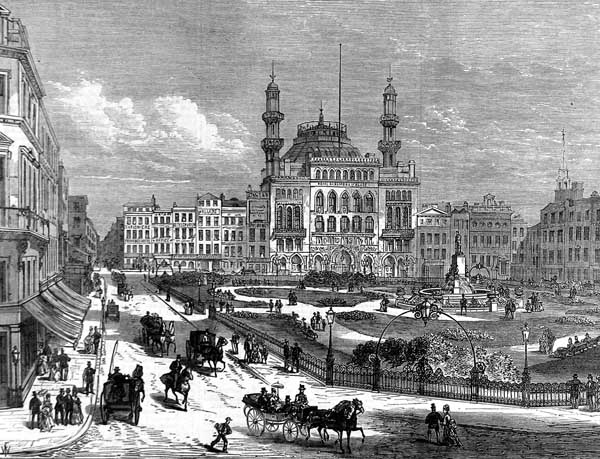
- The Alhambra Theatre dominated Leicester Square in 1874
- Interactive map of Alhambra Theatre
- Address: 23–27 Leicester Square; Westminster, London
- Coordinates: 51.5105°N 0.12915°W
- Type: Music hall
- Current use: Odeon Leicester Square (on site)

Construction
- Rebuilt: 1866 & 1881 Perry and Reed; 1884 Reed; 1888 Edward Clark; 1892 Clark and Pollard; 1897 W. M. Bruton; 1912 Frank Matcham
- Years active: 1854–1936
- Architect: T. Hayter Lewis

The Alhambra Theatre was a popular theatre and music hall located on the east side of Leicester Square, in the West End of London. It was built as the Royal Panopticon of Science and Arts, opening on 18 March 1854. It was closed after two years for a circus ring to be added, and reopened in April 1858 as the Alhambra.

The name was also adopted by many other British music hall theatres located elsewhere: the Alhambra Theatre, Bradford, the Alhambra Theatre Glasgow, etc. The name comes from association with the Moorish splendour of the Alhambra palace in Granada, Spain. The building was demolished in 1936.

== History ==
=== Origins ===
The Alhambra was originally known as the Royal Panopticon and was a landmark building at 23–27 Leicester Square, completed in 1854 by T. Hayter Lewis as a venue for showcasing the finest in the arts and for scientific demonstrations and popular education. This lasted for two years, and then the decision to add a circus ring was taken. When it reopened on 3 April 1858 it was renamed the Alhambra.

The 1858 conversion to the Alhambra Circus, was also by T. Hayter Lewis. It had a 104-foot (31.7 m) frontage and was very tall for the time. It was built in a Moorish style, with lavish fenestration, two towers and a dome, similar to the eponymous Bradford theatre in architectural style, and was a complete contrast with the neighbouring buildings. Inside there was a central rotunda 94 feet (29 m) in diameter and 94 feet (29 m) high. There was a secondary entrance to the rear, on Charing Cross Road.

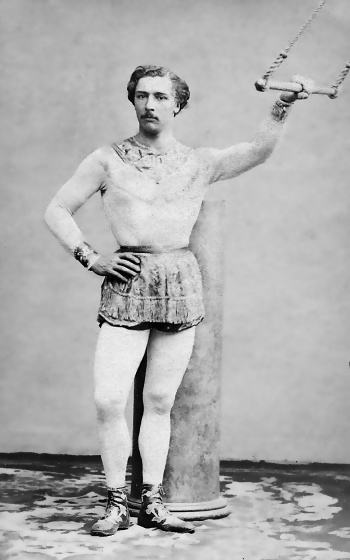
Jules Léotard, The Daring Young Man on the Flying Trapeze, performed his aerial act at the Alhambra.

The name of the theatre was amended frequently, but usually reflected the building's (very loose) stylistic associations with the celebrated Alhambra in Granada, Spain. By 1864, the circus had become the Alhambra Music Hall. Rebuilding by Perry and Reed occurred in 1866 and 1881. From 1871, when it obtained a licence, an equestrian ballet was performed. From 1872 to 1898 (except for 1883–84), Georges Jacobi was musical director of the Alhambra. Over the years he composed more than 100 works for ballet; many of them performed at the Alhambra where for some years the prima ballerina was Emma Palladino.

The Alhambra was destroyed by fire in 1882, and was rebuilt in a more restrained style by Reed, reopening in 1884 as the Alhambra Theatre. Further rebuilding took place, in 1888 by Edward Clark, in 1892 by Clark and Pollard, in 1897 by W. M. Brutton, and in 1912 by the prolific theatre architect, Frank Matcham. Other names used during the life of the theatre were the Royal Alhambra Palace; Alhambra Theatre of Varieties; Theatre Royal, Alhambra; Great United States Circus and New Alhambra Theatre.

=== Entertainments ===
London's Alhambra was predominantly used for music hall, the popular entertainment of the day. The usual music hall acts were performed, as well as the début of Jules Léotard performing his aerial act above the heads of diners in May 1861. Other entertainments included "patriotic demonstrations" celebrating the British Empire and British military successes. The theatre also staged ballet and light opera.

The 1896 entrance on Charing Cross Road, designed by William Mortimer Brutton

In the 1860s, John Hollingshead took over management at the Alhambra and made it famous for its sumptuous staging, alluring corps de ballet and the notorious front-of-house Promenade bar. At its bars, the attractions of the Alhambra's ballet were not merely artistic:

You must please imagine yourself a man about town [in 1870], with money in your pocket and a fancy for a night of pleasure. ... [A]fter a leisurely dinner at the club you find yourself looking at the Alhambra. You [and your companion] are purposely too late for the strident 'variety' with which the programme opens, but in easy time for the Ballet which concludes the first half and is followed by a long – a very long – interval. The interval is one of the main features of the show, for the huge basement canteen is open to any of the audience who think a visit worth while ... You wander down after the ballet, pick up a couple of dancers and buy them champagne. They are cheerful young women still wearing their scanty ballet costumes and with plenty to say for themselves. Nearly an hour passes in telling stories and gossiping about the crowd of swells and chorines who skirmish and lounge and laugh in the long, bare but well lighted room. It is now nearly time for the notorious Can-Can, and you prepare to return to your seats. The ladies wish to say thank you for their wine, and each, with an arm round your neck or his, puts unmistakable provocation into her kiss. She probably ventures other familiarities, and certainly asks softly if you will be near the stage-door when the show is over.

— Michael Sadleir, Fanny by Gaslight (1940)

The Can-Can as presented at the Alhambra by the 'Parisian Colonna' troupe proved so sexually provocative that in October 1870 the Alhambra was deprived of its dancing licence. The musical director of the theatre from 1872 to 1898 was Georges Jacobi, and from 1898 to 1913 was George W. Byng, who composed and conducted the music for many of the ballets and other pieces.

Programme cover from The Bing Boys Are Here, 1916, with caricatures of Alfred Lester as Oliver and George Robey as Lucifer

Another example of the fare on offer was this 1882 production, written by Dion Boucicault (Note: It may be that his diminutive son (Dion Boucicault Jr.) played opposite this statuesque woman.) and J. R. Planche:

Marian, the giant Amazon queen, will make her first appearance in England at the Royal Alhambra Theatre on Saturday, 8th July, in the magnificent silver armour scene in the enormously successful fairy extravaganza, "Babil & Bijou". This young lady was born on the 31st January, 1866, at Benkendorf, a village near the Thuringia Mountains, Germany, and has attained the remarkable height of 8 feet 2 inches (2.49 m), and is still growing.

— Alhambra Theatre poster. Marian the Giant Amazon Queen, 1882

Early films were also a part of the entertainment, with Robert W. Paul, a former collaborator of Birt Acres, presenting his first theatrical programme on 25 March 1896. It included films featuring cartoonist Tom Merry drawing caricatures of the German Emperor Kaiser Wilhelm II (1895), and Prince Bismarck (1895). Merry had previously performed his lightning fast drawing as part of a music hall stage act.

During World War I, a series of hit revues played at the Alhambra, including The Bing Boys Are Here (1916), which featured the first performances of the song If You Were The Only Girl In The World, performed by Violet Lorraine and George Robey . That was followed by The Bing Boys on Broadway (1917) and The Bing Boys are There (1918). The music for the revues was written by Nat D. Ayer with lyrics by Clifford Grey, and the text was by George Grossmith Jr.

Like many other theatres, the Alhambra went into decline after World War I owing to the increasing popularity of cinema and radio. It was demolished in 1936 to make way for the Odeon Leicester Square, which remains on the site. According to a studio press book on the 1936 film "Men Are Not Gods," the demolition of the Alhambra Theatre was delayed so it could be used for staging the play "Othello" for the production of that film. The entrance on Charing Cross Road has also been demolished and is now a modern office block.
