= Karl Puth =

German cinematographer

Karl Puth (1891–1955) was a German cinematographer.

== Selected filmography ==
- The Green Manuela (1923)
- The Countess of Paris (1923)
- In the Name of the King (1924)
- Orient Express (1927)
- Attorney for the Heart (1927)
- The Master of Nuremberg (1927)
- Angst (1928)
- Kitty (1929)
- A Mother's Love (1929)
- White Cargo (1929)
- Everybody Wins (1930)
- My Wife, the Impostor (1931)
- The True Jacob (1931)
- Headfirst into Happiness (1931)
- I'll Stay with You (1931)
- The Old Scoundrel (1932)
- The Company's in Love (1932)
- The Tsarevich (1933)
- The Star of Valencia (1933)
- And the Plains Are Gleaming (1933)
- Adventures on the Lido (1933)
- The Sporck Battalion (1934)
- Mother and Child (1934)
- The Old and the Young King (1935)
- The Valley of Love (1935)
- City of Anatol (1936)
- The Adventurer of Paris (1936)
- Augustus the Strong (1936)
- Wells in Flames (1937)
- An Enemy of the People (1937)
- The Impossible Mister Pitt (1938)
- The Night of Decision (1938)
- The Song of Aixa (1939)
- A Woman Like You (1939)
- The Merciful Lie (1939)
- Der Herr im Haus (1940)
- Passion (1940)
- Charivan (1941)
- Two Happy People (1943)
- Elephant Fury (1953)

== Bibliography ==
- Bergfelder, Tim & Harris, Sue & Street, Sarah. Film Architecture and the Transnational Imagination: Set Design in 1930s European Cinema. Amsterdam University Press, 2007.
