= The Star of Valencia (German-language film) =

1933 film

- Directed by: Alfred Zeisler
- Written by: Otto Eis; Rudolf Katscher; Axel Rudolf; Friedrich Zeckendorf
- Produced by: Alfred Zeisler
- Starring: Liane Haid; Peter Erkelenz; Ossi Oswalda; Paul Westermeier
- Cinematography: Werner Brandes; Karl Puth
- Edited by: Wolfgang Becker
- Music by: Richard Stauch
- Production company: UFA
- Distributed by: UFA
- Release date: 5 July 1933
- Running time: 90 minutes
- Country: Germany
- Language: German

The Star of Valencia (German: Der Stern von Valencia) is a 1933 German drama film directed by Alfred Zeisler and starring Liane Haid, Peter Erkelenz and Ossi Oswalda. It was made in Mallorca, at the same time as a French-language version The Star of Valencia directed by Serge de Poligny. It was made at the Babelsberg Studios in Berlin. The film's sets were designed by the art director Otto Hunte. Location shooting took place in Mallorca and Valencia.

== Cast ==
- Liane Haid as Marion Savreda
- Peter Erkelenz as Kapitän Mendozza
- Ossi Oswalda as Rita
- Paul Westermeier as Sergeant Savedra
- Eduard Wesener as Leutnant Diaz
- Hans Deppe as Sergeant José
- Fritz Odemar as Kapitän Rustan
- Friedrich Gnaß as Diego
- Willi Schur as Beppo
- Oskar Sima as Patesco
- Hertha Russ as Elinor
- Friedrich Ettel
- Rudolf Platte
- Arthur Reinhardt
- Wolfgang von Schwindt
- Hugo Werner-Kahle

== Bibliography ==
- Bock, Hans-Michael; Bergfelder, Tim, eds. (2009). The Concise Cinegraph: Encyclopaedia of German Cinema. New York: Berghahn Books. ISBN 978-1-57181-655-9.
