= Clothes shop =

Shop which sells ready made clothes

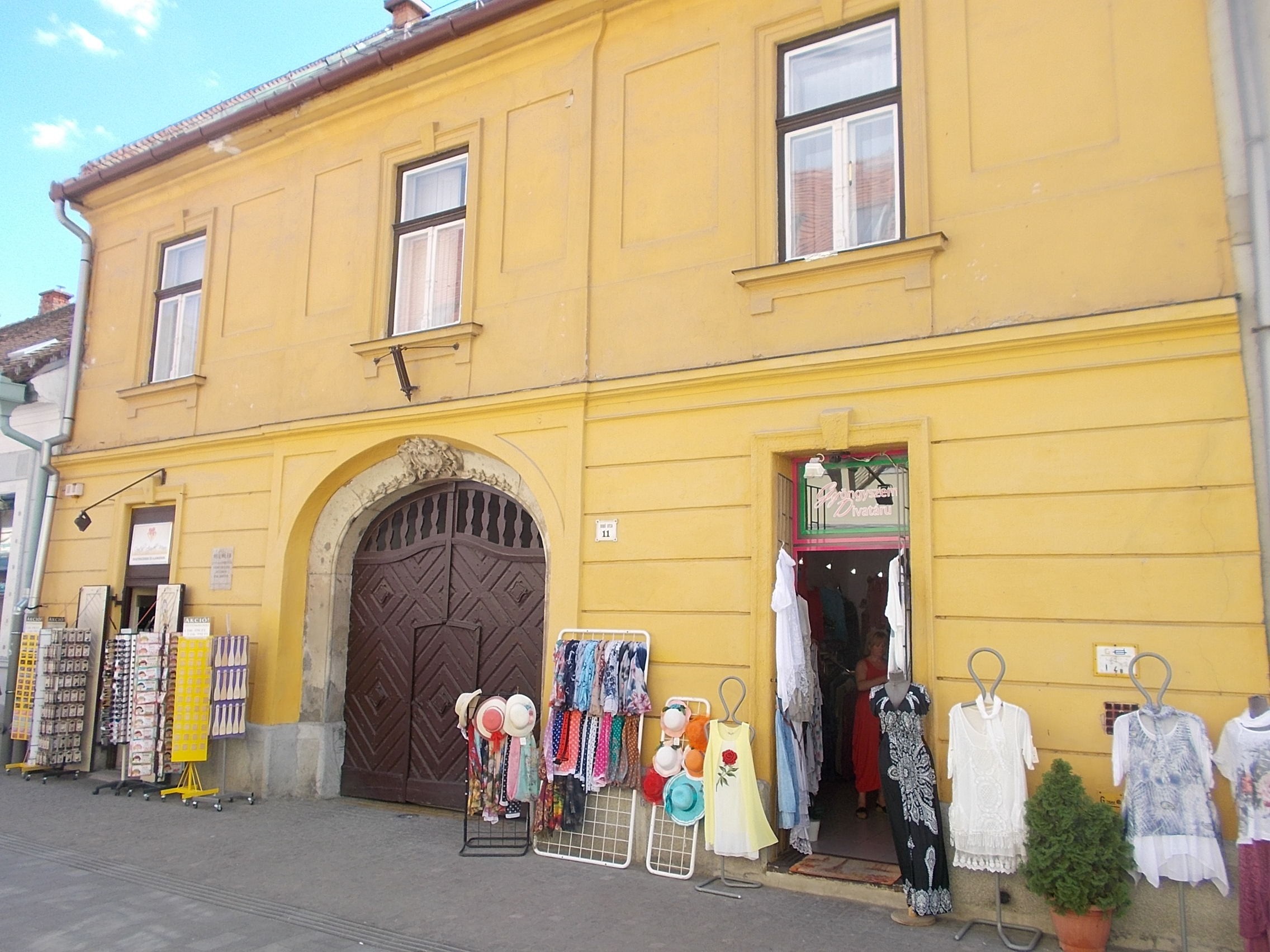
In Eger, Heves County, Hungary

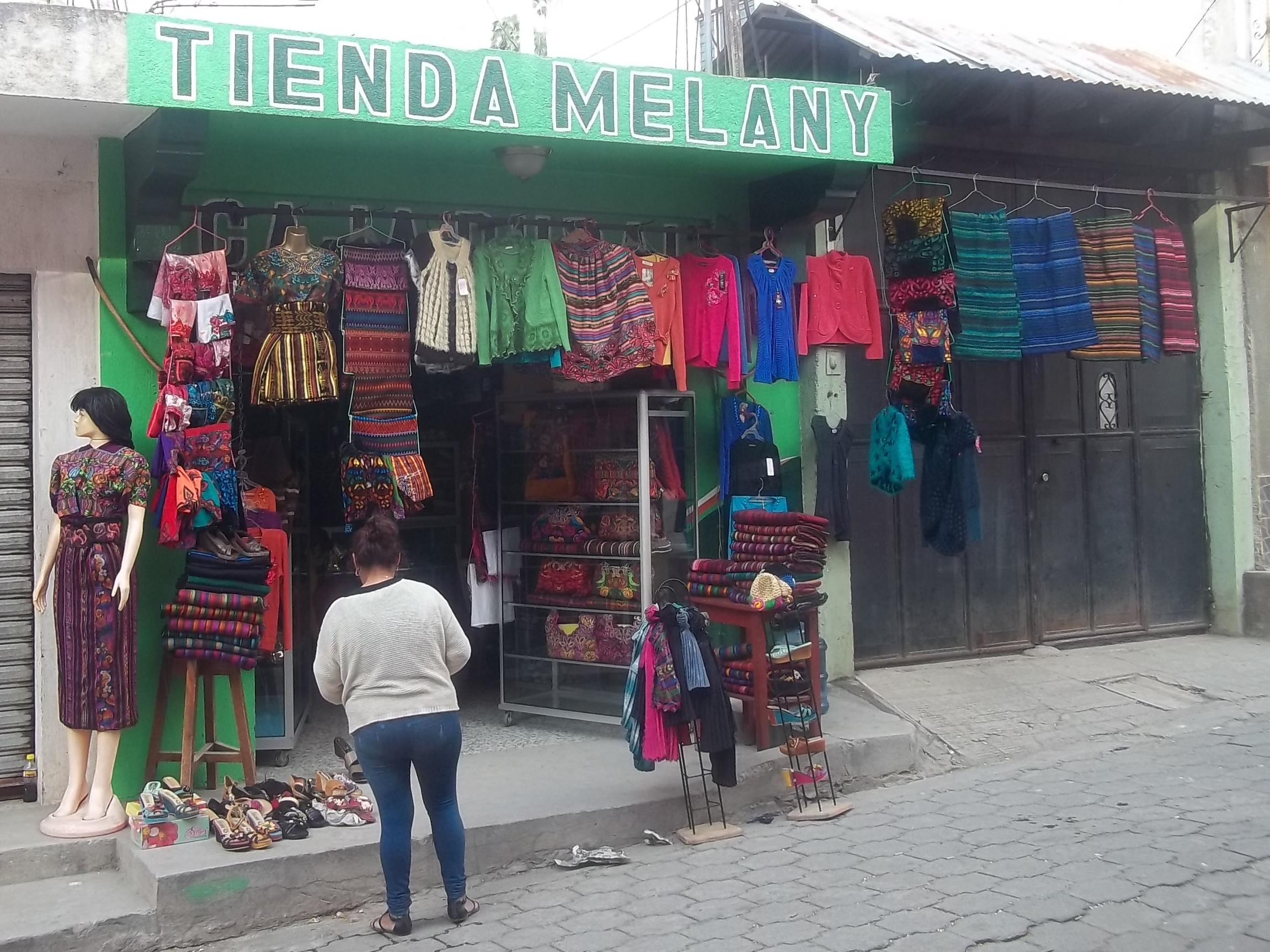
In San Martín Sacatepéquez, Quetzaltenango, Guatemala

A clothes shop or clothes store is any shop which sells items of ready-made clothing. A small shop which sells expensive or designer clothing may be called a boutique. A shop that sells clothes for a specialised market such as school uniforms or outdoor sports may be called an outfitter.

== History ==
It is not known when the first clothes shops were opened in Europe. Before the era of ready-made clothes, when clothing was made by tailors or artisans, shops may have sold second-hand clothing. Some ready-made clothes may have been made in the sixteenth century. The number of clothes shops appears to have risen steadily long before the beginning of large-scale industrial manufacture of clothing in the second half of the nineteenth century.
