= Fritz Zeckendorf =

Hungarian-German writer

- Born: 7 January 1886; Budapest, Austro Hungarian Empire
- Died: 17 May 1943 (aged 57); Auschwitz concentration camp, German-occupied Poland
- Other name: Friedrich Zeckendorf
- Occupations: Sreenwriter, novelist
- Years active: 1931-1937 (film)

Fritz Zeckendorf (1886–1943) was a Hungarian screenwriter and novelist, active in German cinema during the Weimar era. Following the Nazi takeover in 1933 the Jewish Zeckendorf was barred from working in the German film industry. A 1935 German film The Man with the Paw was adapted from his novel of the same title, although he was not employed on the project. His final work came when he wrote the screenplay for Kurt Gerron's Dutch-Italian co-production The Three Wishes in 1937. In 1943 he was deported from Berlin to the Auschwitz concentration camp where he was murdered as part of the holocaust.

== Biography ==
After completing his doctorate, he began working as a journalist and writer. It was not until the dawn of the sound-film era that Zeckendorf became regularly involved with the cinema. He wrote—often in collaboration with Philipp Lothar Mayring—primarily lighthearted, comedic films, as well as occasional dramatic stories. Most of these films also had French-language versions.

With the Nazi seizure of power, his career came to an abrupt end due to his Jewish heritage.

Following the filming of The Star of Valencia (Der Stern von Valencia) (between February and April 1933), Zeckendorf received no further commissions for German films. His name was omitted from the opening credits of the adaptation of his novel, The Man with the Paw (Der Mann mit der Pranke). Zeckendorf, who remained in Berlin, was declared persona non grata in 1935.

The only person who enabled him to continue working on a screenplay was the Jewish actor-director Kurt Gerron—who had fled to the Netherlands and for whom Zeckendorf had frequently written scripts prior to 1933. In late spring 1937, Zeckendorf was able to travel to Rome to work on the Dutch-Italian co-production The Three Wishes (Drie wenschen).

During the final major waves of deportations from Berlin, Friedrich Zeckendorf was transported from his home in the city to Auschwitz on May 17, 1943; he was likely gassed at Auschwitz-Birkenau shortly after his arrival.

== Selected filmography ==
- The Battle of Bademunde (1931)
- The Company's in Love (1931)
- My Wife, the Impostor (1931)
- When Love Sets the Fashion (1932)
- Spoiling the Game (1932)
- Narcotics (1932)
- The White Demon (1932)
- A Mad Idea (1932)
- Things Are Getting Better Already (1932)
- The Star of Valencia (1933)
- The Man with the Paw (1935)
- The Three Wishes (1937)

== Bibliography ==
- Weniger, Kay. Zwischen Bühne und Baracke: Lexikon der verfolgten Theater-, Film- und Musikkünstler 1933 bis 1945. Metropol, 2008.
