= Herbert Lippschitz =

German art director

- Born: 28 February 1904; Berlin, German Empire
- Died: 13 September 1972 (aged 68); Munich, Bavaria, West Germany
- Other names: Herbert O. Phillips; Herbert Lippschütz
- Occupation: Art director
- Years active: 1929–1957 (film)

Herbert Lippschitz (1904–1972) was a German art director. He rose to prominence during the Weimar Republic in the early sound era. The Jewish Lippschitz was forced to leave Germany following the rise of the Nazi Party to power in 1933. This largely halted his career although he was sporadically involved in films in a variety of different countries. He is sometimes credited as Herbert O. Phillips.

== Selected filmography ==
- The Shot in the Sound Film Studio (1930)
- The Citadel of Warsaw (1930)
- Express 13 (1931)
- I Go Out and You Stay Here (1931)
- The Secret of the Red Cat (1931)
- A Crafty Youth (1931)
- You Will Be My Wife (1932)
- At Your Orders, Sergeant (1932)
- Spoiling the Game (1932)
- Crime Reporter Holm (1932)
- Two Heavenly Blue Eyes (1932)
- And the Plains Are Gleaming (1933)
- Wild Cattle (1934)
- Hit and Run (1957)
