= The Postponed Wedding Night =

The Postponed Wedding Night (German:Die vertagte Hochzeitsnacht) may refer to:

- The Postponed Wedding Night (play), a work by Franz Arnold and Ernst Bach
- The Postponed Wedding Night (1924 film), a German silent film
- The Postponed Wedding Night (1953 film), a West German film
