= Hooray, It's a Boy! =

Hooray, It's a Boy! (German: Hurra - ein Junge!) may refer to:

- Hooray, It's a Boy! (play), a German play by Franz Arnold and Ernst Bach
- Hooray, It's a Boy! (1931 film), a German film directed by Georg Jacoby
- Hooray, It's a Boy! (1953 film), a West German film directed by Ernst Marischka

== See also ==
- It's a Boy, a 1933 British film
