= Spanish fly =

Spanish fly or Spanish Fly may refer to:

- Lytta vesicatoria, a species of beetle
- Cantharidin, a poisonous compound secreted by blister beetles, historically used in medication and as an aphrodisiac

== Film ==
- Spanish Fly (1975 film), a British comedy
- Spanish Fly (1985 film), a French film directed by José Bénazéraf
- Spanish Fly (2003 film), an American comedy
- The Spanish Fly (1931 film), a German film based on the play listed below
- The Spanish Fly (1955 film), a remake of the German film based on the play listed below

== Music ==
- Spanish Fly (band), an American avant garde jazz trio
- Spanish Fly (album), a 1987 album by Lisa Lisa and Cult Jam
- "Spanish Fly", a guitar instrumental by Van Halen from Van Halen II
- "Spanish Fly", a song by Aventura from The Last
- "Spanish Fly", a song by Finch from Say Hello to Sunshine

== Other uses ==
- The Spanish Fly (play), a 1913 German comedy by Franz Arnold and Ernst Bach
- "Spanish Fly" (Beavis and Butt-head), a 1995 television episode
- "Spanish Fly" (Citizen Smith), a 1979 television episode
- Spanish fly (professional wrestling), a double-team maneuver
- Spanish Fly, a 2007 novel by Will Ferguson

== See also ==
- "Spanish Flea", a popular 1960s song
- "Spanish Fry", an episode of Futurama
