= Josef the Chaste =

Josef the Chaste (German:Der keusche Josef) may refer to:

- Josef the Chaste (1930 film), directed by Georg Jacoby
- Josef the Chaste (1953 film), directed by Carl Boese
