= Weekend in Paradise =

Weekend in Paradise may refer to:

- Weekend in Paradise (1931 film), a German musical comedy film
- Weekend in Paradise (1952 film), a West German comedy film
- "Weekend In Paradise", a song by Jamie Webster
