= The True Jacob =

The True Jacob may refer to:

- The True Jacob (1931 film), a German comedy film
- The True Jacob (1960 film), a West German comedy film
