= Ex-Bad Boy =

1931 film

- Directed by: Vin Moore
- Screenplay by: Fred Niblo, Jr. Dale Van Every
- Based on: The Whole Town's Talking; 1923 play by Anita Loos; John Emerson
- Produced by: Carl Laemmle, Jr.
- Starring: Robert Armstrong; Jean Arthur; Jason Robards, Sr. Spencer Charters; Grayce Hampton; Lola Lane
- Cinematography: Jerome Ash
- Edited by: Harry W. Lieb
- Production company: Universal Pictures
- Distributed by: Universal Pictures
- Release date: July 15, 1931
- Running time: 76 minutes
- Country: United States
- Language: English

Ex-Bad Boy is a 1931 American comedy film directed by Vin Moore and written by Fred Niblo, Jr. and Dale Van Every. The film stars Robert Armstrong, Jean Arthur, Jason Robards, Sr., Spencer Charters, Grayce Hampton and Lola Lane. It is based on the play The Whole Town's Talking by Anita Loos and John Emerson, which in turn is based on a play by Franz Arnold and Ernst Bach. The film was released on July 15, 1931, by Universal Pictures.

== Cast ==
- Robert Armstrong as Chester Binney
- Jean Arthur as Ethel Simmons
- Jason Robards, Sr. as Roger Shields
- Spencer Charters as Henry Simmons
- Grayce Hampton as Mrs. Simmons
- Lola Lane as Letta Lardo
- George Brent as Donald Swift
- Mary Doran as Sadie Bloom

== See also ==
- The Whole Town's Talking (1926)
- A Rumor of Love (1960)
