= A Warm Corner =

1930 film

- Directed by: Victor Saville
- Written by: Arthur Wimperis; Lauri Wylie; Angus MacPhail; Victor Saville
- Based on: Stöpsel, a 1926 play by Franz Arnold; Ernst Bach
- Produced by: Michael Balcon
- Starring: Leslie Henson; Heather Thatcher; Austin Melford
- Cinematography: Freddie Young
- Edited by: Maclean Rogers
- Production company: Gainsborough Pictures
- Distributed by: Ideal Films
- Release date: 30 September 1930
- Running time: 104 minutes
- Country: United Kingdom
- Language: English

A Warm Corner is a 1930 British comedy film directed by Victor Saville and starring Leslie Henson, Heather Thatcher and Austin Melford. It was written by Arthur Wimperis, Lauri Wylie, Angus MacPhail and Saville based on the 1926 play Stöpsel by Franz Arnold and Ernst Bach. It features an early screen appearance by Merle Oberon.

It was made at British and Dominions Elstree Studios by Gainsborough Pictures with sets designed by Walter Murton.

== Cast ==
- Leslie Henson as Mr Corner
- Heather Thatcher as Mimi
- Austin Melford as Peter Price
- Connie Ediss as Mrs Corner
- Toni Edgar-Bruce as Lady Bayswater
- Alfred Wellesley as Mr Turner
- Kim Peacock as Count Toscani
- Belle Chrystall as Peggy
- George DeWarfaz as Count Pasetti
- Harry Crocker as Joseph
- Merle Oberon as minor role

== Reception ==
The movie was a financial success.

Film Weekly wrote: "Those who are seized with paroxysms of mirth at the sight of the face and antics of Leslie Henson will be overjoyed with this film, which is as generous a dose of Mr. Henson as one could wish for. ... Mr. Henson's face and figure occupy a large portion of the picture, and he is very funny, despite a certain vulgarity in the material he has to use."

Kine Weekly wrote: "Spirited fun and infectious humour in a rollicking adaptation of the successful stage farce. Leslie Henson and Connie Ediss work tremendously hard and, as a result of their stage technique, make every gag and witticism appear spontaneous."

The Daily Film Renter wrote: "Packed full of irresistible fun which never flags and is literally riot of mirth. Brilliant acting by Leslie Henson and his merry band, make this picture top-notcher in entertainment value."
