= Oh, Such a Night! =

1937 film

- Directed by: Anders Henrikson
- Written by: Weyler Hildebrand; Torsten Lundqvist
- Based on: Die vertagte Nacht by Franz Arnold and Ernst Bach
- Produced by: Carl Anderson
- Starring: Thor Modéen; Sickan Carlsson; Birgit Tengroth; Kirsten Heiberg
- Cinematography: Ferenc Zádori; Elner Åkesson
- Edited by: Oscar Rosander
- Music by: Jules Sylvain
- Production company: Film AB Imago
- Distributed by: Fribergs Filmbyrå
- Release date: 30 August 1937
- Running time: 86 minutes
- Country: Sweden
- Language: Swedish

Oh, Such a Night! (Swedish: O, en så'n natt!) is a 1937 Swedish romantic comedy film directed by Anders Henrikson and starring Thor Modéen, Sickan Carlsson, Birgit Tengroth and Kirsten Heiberg. It was shot at the Råsunda Studios in Stockholm. The film's sets were designed by the art director Arne Åkermark. It is based on the 1924 German play Die vertagte Nacht by Franz Arnold and Ernst Bach, previously made into the 1936 British film The Interrupted Honeymoon and later into the 1953 West German release The Postponed Wedding Night.

== Synopsis ==
A couple heads to Örebro to spend their wedding night. Their honeymoon gets off to a bad start when the wife finds another woman in her husband's bed. A series of complications ensue.

== Cast ==
- Thor Modéen as Adrian Berggren
- Sickan Carlsson as Irma Berggren
- Åke Söderblom as Efraim Zelin
- Birgit Tengroth as Edit Zelin, Efraim's Wife
- Kirsten Heiberg as Lola Kasaell
- Erik 'Bullen' Berglund as Julius Broberg
- Allan Bohlin as Klas Hölling
- Elof Ahrle as Concierge
- Katie Rolfsen as Millan Karlgren
- Julia Cæsar as Ida Berggren
- Naemi Briese as Cleaning-lady
- Bror Bügler as Knutte
- Aina Elkan as Miss Gustafsson
- Birgit Essén as Anna, Berggren's Housemaid
- Erik Forslund as Customer
- Anders Henrikson as Pharmacist
- Jullan Jonsson as Hanna, Efraim's Housemaid
- Harald Wehlnor as Customer

== Bibliography ==
- Qvist, Per Olov & von Bagh, Peter. Guide to the Cinema of Sweden and Finland. Greenwood Publishing Group, 2000.
