= Business Under Distress =

1931 film

- Directed by: Karel Lamač; Martin Frič
- Written by: Václav Wasserman
- Based on: Unter Geschäftsaufsicht by Franz Arnold and Ernst Bach
- Starring: Vlasta Burian
- Cinematography: Otto Heller
- Edited by: Marie Bourová
- Music by: Jára Beneš
- Production company: Elektafilm
- Release date: 1931
- Running time: 91 minutes
- Country: Czechoslovakia
- Language: Czech

Business Under Distress (Czech: To neznáte Hadimršku) is a 1931 Czech comedy film directed by Karel Lamač and Martin Frič. A German version of the movie Wehe, wenn er losgelassen was released in 1932.

== Cast ==
- Vlasta Burian as Popelec Hadimrška
- Meda Valentová as Mici Angora
- Otto Rubík as Jiří Zlatník
- Marie Grossová as Asta Vieland
- Čeněk Šlégl as Consul Peter Vieland
- Jaroslav Marvan as Bruckmann, general director
- Jindřich Plachta as Butler Puntík
- Eman Fiala as Vychodil
- Světla Svozilová as Cousin Aloysia Zlatnik
- Josef Rovenský as The Pickpocket
- Jan Richter as Police Commissar
- Jan W. Speerger as Salesman / angel in the dream / councillor

== See also ==
- Wehe, wenn er losgelassen (1932)
- The Dangerous Game (1933)
- Josef the Chaste (1953)
