= Wehe, wenn er losgelassen =

1932 film

- Directed by: Martin Frič; Karel Lamač
- Written by: Václav Wasserman; Fritz Anders
- Based on: Unter Geschäftsaufsicht (play) by Franz Arnold and Ernst Bach
- Produced by: Artur Hohenberg
- Starring: Vlasta Burian
- Cinematography: Otto Heller
- Edited by: Marie Bourová
- Music by: Jára Beneš
- Production companies: Elektafilm; Ondra-Lamač Film
- Distributed by: Elektafilm
- Release date: 8 April 1932
- Running time: 80 minutes
- Countries: Germany; Czechoslovakia
- Language: German

Wehe, wenn er losgelassen (lit. "Woe if He is Let Loose") is a 1932 German-Czech comedy film directed by Martin Frič and Karel Lamač. It is a German language version of the Czech film Business Under Distress (1931).

== Cast ==
- Vlasta Burian as Theobald Haselhuhn
- Mabel Hariot as Pussi Angora
- Harry Frank as Georg Schilling
- Friedl Haerlin as Asta, his daughter
- Friedrich Hölzlin as General Director Bruckmann
- Karl Forest as Frank Krüge
- Josef Rovenský as prisoner
- Eugen Jensen as Consul Wieland
- Inge Rahm as Loisi
- Josef Holub as servant Kampl (as Seff Holub)
- Anny Ondra as secretary Mana Müller
- Friedl Haerlin as Asta Wielandt
- Jan W. Speerger as shopkeeper

== See also ==
- Business Under Distress (1931)
- The Dangerous Game (1933)
- Josef the Chaste (1953)
