= Uncle Bob =

Uncle Bob may refer to:

- Bob Randall (Aboriginal Australian elder) (c.1934–2015)
- Bob Santos (activist) (1934–2016), American activist for Seattle's Chinatown-International District
- Robert C. Martin (born 1952), American software consultant and author
- Robert Mugabe (1924–2019), second president of Zimbabwe (1987—2017), previously prime minister (1980–1987)
- Robert M. Veatch (1843–1925), American politician from Oregon
- Robert Stewart (entrepreneur) (1918–2006), American businessman in the Philippines

== See also ==
- Uncle Bob's Self Storage, American self-storage company
- Unkle Bob, Scottish band
- Bob's your uncle (disambiguation)
