= Heather Thatcher =

English actress (1896–1987)

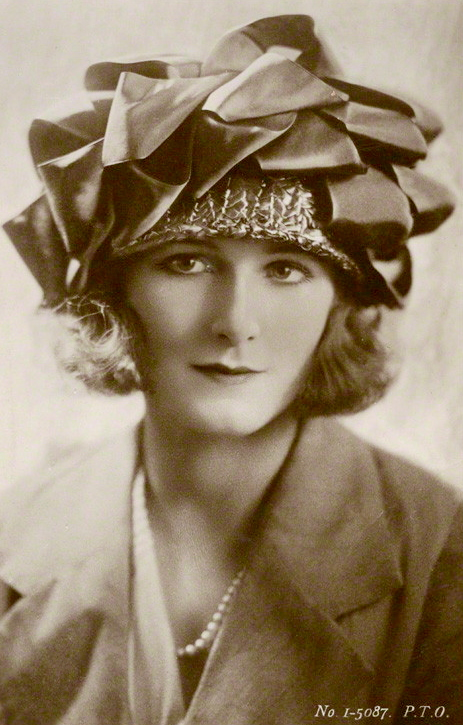
- Born: 3 September 1896; London, England
- Died: 15 January 1987 (aged 90); Hillingdon, London, England
- Occupations: Actress and dancer
- Years active: 1915–1955

Heather Thatcher (3 September 1896 – 15 January 1987) was an English actress in theatre and films.

== Career ==
=== Dance ===
By 1922, Thatcher was a dancer. She was especially noted for her interpretation of an Egyptian harem dance. Her exotic clothes were designed in Russia. They featured stencil slits in the waist, trouserettes and sleeves. Her attire was billed as the boldest costume ever shown in Britain.

=== Theatre ===
Thatcher made her debut on the London stage in 1916 in The Girl from Cirro's at the Garrick Theatre, before going on to play a role in The Boy at the Adelphi Theatre. In 1923, she sang and danced in another musical comedy, The Beauty Prize, at the Winter Garden Theatre.

In March 1924, whilst travelling to the south of France on a short holiday with the actor and comedian Leslie Henson, Thatcher was a passenger on a Riviera Express train that derailed four miles outside of Lyon, killing three. She was trapped under the wreckage for almost an hour before being rescued but suffered only minor bruising. The sleeping berth directly above her had been empty at the time of the crash and acted as a canopy when the carriages collided, protecting her from more serious injury. In August 1926, she appeared in Thy Name Is Woman at the Q Theatre. It marked her transition from musical comedy to serious acting.

She continued her London stage work, performing with June Clyde in Lucky Break. Premiering at the Strand Theatre in September 1934, the theatrical presentation was a production of Leslie Henson. In 1937, Thatcher went to the United States in Full House. The previous season, she was paired with Ivor Novello in the English rendition. Jack Buchanan, Austin Trevor and Coral Browne teamed with Thatcher in Canaries Sometimes Sing (1947). Produced by Firth Shephard, the theatrical presentation opened in Blackpool and moved to London a month later. Thatcher participated in a Salute To Ivor Novello at the London Coliseum in September 1951. The production raised funds to run his old home, Redroofs. It had been purchased by the Actors' Benevolent Fund.

=== Film ===
The Plaything (1929), produced by Castleton Knight and Elstree Studios, begins as a silent film. It develops into a sound film. The theme concerns a Highland laird who falls in love with a hedonistic London heiress. Thatcher plays a prominent role as Martyn Bennett.

In 1931, she visited Hollywood. As a star of English comedy, she was being compared to Marilyn Miller. In the autumn of 1931, she was invited to a reception following the premiere of Strictly Dishonorable (1931), at the Carthay Circle Theatre. Among her friends in films were Anthony Bushell and Zelma O'Neal.

Thatcher was signed by MGM in February 1932. She was given a feature role in But the Flesh Is Weak (1932). The film stars Robert Montgomery and is directed by Jack Conway. The film was adapted from a British stage production that showcased Novello. Thatcher was praised for her performance. The English actress "gives a brilliant performance and creates the only human being in the piece."

Thatcher sued Gloria Swanson British Productions for breach of contract in a suit that was settled in December 1933. During the filming of Perfect Understanding (1933) Thatcher's contract was cancelled before the production was completed. No explanation was given. She was excluded from the film when a new author was hired. The replacement writer chose to eliminate her character.

The Private Life of Don Juan (1934) was also filmed at Elstree Studios. The film had Douglas Fairbanks Sr. as its leading man. Owen Nares played the title role and Thatcher played Anna Dora, one of the ladies.

Later in her career, Thatcher returned to the UK to make films. Among these is Will Any Gentleman...? (1953), filmed at Elstree Studios in Borehamwood. Thatcher appeared together with George Cole and Veronica Hurst. The film was a short adventure about a hypnotist who puts a man in a trance.

Thatcher made her last films in 1955. The Deep Blue Sea, screenplay written by Terence Rattigan, featured Vivien Leigh and Kenneth More. Thatcher depicted Aunt May Luton in Josephine and Men, a comedy starring Glynis Johns and Peter Finch.

== Death ==
Thatcher died in Hillingdon, London, in 1987. In her will, she left bequests to various charities, including the NSPCC, Help the Aged and the Royal National Institute for the Blind.

== Selected filmography ==
- The Prisoner of Zenda (1915) - Extra (uncredited)
- Altar Chains (1916) - Alice Vaughan
- The Key of the World (1918) - Dina Destin
- Pallard the Punter (1919) - Gladys Callender
- The First Men in the Moon (1919) - Susan
- The Green Terror (1919) - Olive Crosswell
- The Little Hour of Peter Wells (1920) - Camille Pablo
- The Plaything (1929) - Martyn Bennett
- A Warm Corner (1930) - Mimi
- Comets (1930) - Himself
- Stepping Stones (1931)
- But the Flesh Is Weak (1932) - Lady Joan Culver
- It's a Boy (1933) - Anita Gunn
- Loyalties (1933) - Margaret Orme
- The Private Life of Don Juan (1934) - Anna Dora, an Actress as Actresses Go
- The Dictator (1935) - Lady of the Court
- Mama Steps Out (1937) - Nadine Wentworth - the Poet
- The Thirteenth Chair (1937) - Mary Eastwood
- Tovarich (1937) - Lady Kartegann
- Fools for Scandal (1938) - Lady Potter-Porter
- If I Were King (1938) - The Queen
- Girls' School (1938) - Miss Brackett
- Beau Geste (1939) - Lady Patricia Brandon
- Man Hunt (1941) - Lady Alice Risborough
- Son of Fury: The Story of Benjamin Blake (1942) - Maggie Martin
- We Were Dancing (1942) - Mrs. Tyler-Blane
- This Above All (1942) - Nurse (uncredited)
- The Moon and Sixpence (1942) - Rose Waterford (uncredited)
- The Undying Monster (1942) - Christy
- Journey for Margaret (1942) - Mrs. Harris
- Above Suspicion (1943) - English Girl Dancing with Richard (uncredited)
- Flesh and Fantasy (1943) - Lady Flora (uncredited)
- Gaslight (1944) - Lady Dalroy
- Anna Karenina (1948) - Countess Lydia Ivanovna
- Trottie True (1949) - Angela Platt-Brown
- Dear Mr. Prohack (1949) - Lady Maslam
- Encore (1951) - Eva Barrett (segment "Gigolo and Gigolette")
- Father's Doing Fine (1952) - Lady Buckering
- The Hour of 13 (1952) - Mrs. Chumley Orr
- Will Any Gentleman...? (1953) - Mrs. Whittle
- Duel in the Jungle (1954) - Lady on S.S. Nigeria
- The Deep Blue Sea (1955) - Lady Dawson
- Josephine and Men (1955) - Aunt May Luton (final film role)
