= The Daring Swimmer (1957 film) =

1957 film directed by Karl Anton

- German film poster
- German: Der kühne Schwimmer
- Directed by: Karl Anton
- Written by: Franz Arnold (play); Ernst Bach (play); Peter Hamel; Gustav Kampendonk
- Produced by: Luggi Waldleitner
- Starring: Gunther Philipp; Susanne Cramer; Walter Gross
- Cinematography: Hannes Staudinger
- Edited by: Elisabeth Kleinert-Neumann
- Music by: Erwin Halletz
- Production company: Roxy Film
- Distributed by: Constantin Film
- Release date: 19 September 1957
- Running time: 89 minutes
- Country: West Germany
- Language: German

The Daring Swimmer (German: Der kühne Schwimmer) is a 1957 West German comedy film directed by Karl Anton and starring Gunther Philipp, Susanne Cramer and Walter Gross. It was shot at the Bavaria Studios in Munich. The film's sets were designed by the art directors Wolf Englert and Ernst Richter.

== Cast ==
- Gunther Philipp as Otto von Senff - Damenwäschefabrikant
- Susanne Cramer as Gaby Marshall
- Walter Gross as Dr. Hans Sommer
- Ruth Stephan as Karin Biedermann
- Gunnar Möller as Dr. Richard Moebius
- Ursula Herwig as Ulla von Senff - Otto's sister
- Boy Gobert as Fritz Hohebirke
- Hanita Hallan as Lili Jonas
- Franz Muxeneder as Xaver Kraxentrager
- Hilde Berndt as Emma
- Franz Fröhlich as mayor
- Lolita as herself, singer
- Harry Halm
- Elsie Attenhofer as Tante Katie
- Samira Soliaman as singer
- Jörg Maria Berg as himself, singer
- Georg Blädel as himself, singer
- Stan Oliver as himself, singer

== See also ==
- The Daring Swimmer (1934)
