= Bob's your uncle (disambiguation) =

Bob's your uncle is an expression generally meaning "and there you have it."

Bob's your uncle or Bob's yer uncle may also refer to:

== Music ==
- Bob's Yer Uncle (band), an alternative rock band in Chicago, IL USA
- Bob's Your Uncle (band), a late-1980s alternative rock group in Canada
- "Bob's Yer Uncle", a song by the band Happy Mondays from their album Pills 'n' Thrills and Bellyaches
- "Bop's Your Uncle", a bebop composition by British jazz pianist George Shearing

== Other ==
- Bob's Your Uncle (film), a 1942 British film
- Bob's Your Uncle (musical), a 1948 British musical comedy
- Bob's Your Uncle (YouTuber), a Hong Kong YouTuber who makes videos about cooking and travelling
