= Tons of Money =

Tons of Money may refer to:

- Tons of Money (play), a 1922 comic play by the British writer Will Evans
- Tons of Money (1924 film), a British silent film adaptation
- Tons of Money (1930 film), a British sound remake
