= Josef the Chaste (1953 film) =

1953 film directed by Carl Boese

- German film poster
- German: Der keusche Josef
- Directed by: Carl Boese
- Written by: Franz Arnold (play Unter Geschäftsaufsicht); Ernst Bach (play Unter Geschäftsaufsicht); Vineta Bastian-Klinger
- Starring: Ludwig Schmitz; Waltraut Haas; Renate Mannhardt
- Cinematography: Bruno Timm
- Edited by: Margarete Steinborn
- Music by: Heino Gaze
- Production company: Algefa Film
- Distributed by: Constantin Film
- Release date: 26 June 1953
- Running time: 94 minutes
- Country: West Germany
- Language: German

Josef the Chaste (German: Der keusche Josef) is a 1953 West German comedy film directed by Carl Boese and starring Ludwig Schmitz, Waltraut Haas and Renate Mannhardt.

It is not a remake of Josef the Chaste (1930) with Harry Liedtke.

== Cast ==
- Ludwig Schmitz as Josef Haselhuhn
- Waltraut Haas as Hilde Wolf
- Renate Mannhardt as Pussy Angor
- Peter Mosbacher as Georg Schilling
- Lucie Englisch as Emilie Haselhuhn
- Ernst Waldow as director Wolf
- Gunther Philipp as Teddy Brand
- Ewald Wenck as Knispel
- Herbert Kiper as Weber
- Alexa von Porembsky as Lotte Müller
- Karin Von Dassel as Babette
- Elena Luber as Marlise Haselhuhn
- Erich Kestin as Martens
- Erwin Biegel
- Bruno Fritz as Bruckmann
- Clemens Hasse as Schmaltollen-Emil
- Paul Heidemann as bar director
- Friedel Hensch as singer
- Werner Müller as bandleader

== See also ==
- Business Under Distress (1931)
- Wehe, wenn er losgelassen (1932)
- The Dangerous Game (1933)
