= Lotti Krekel =

German actress and singer (1941–2023)

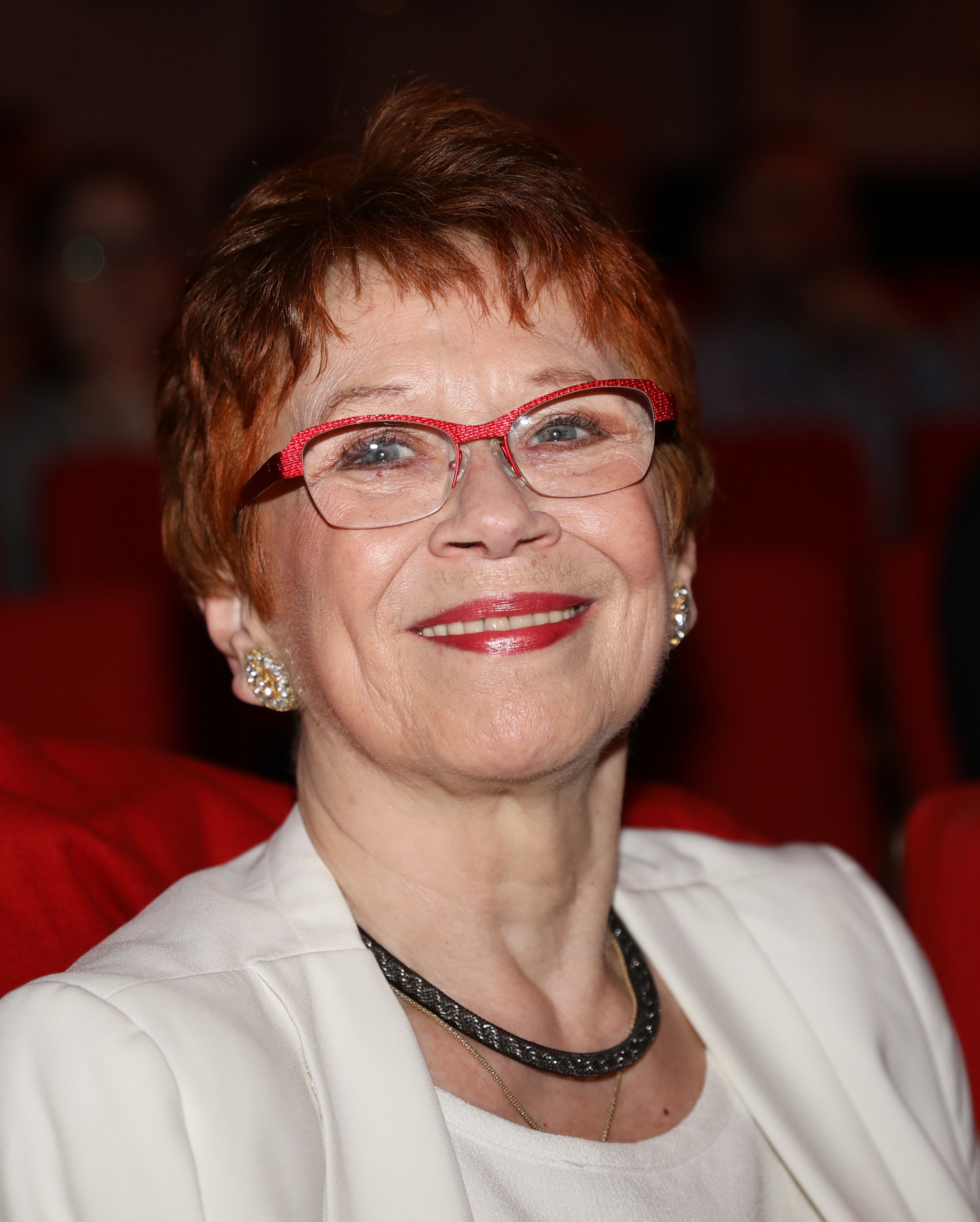

Lotti Krekel (23 August 1941 – 11 April 2023) was a German actress and singer.

== Partial filmography ==
- The True Jacob
- Willy the Private Detective
- Robert and Bertram
