= Ernst Bach =

German playwright and author (1876–1929)

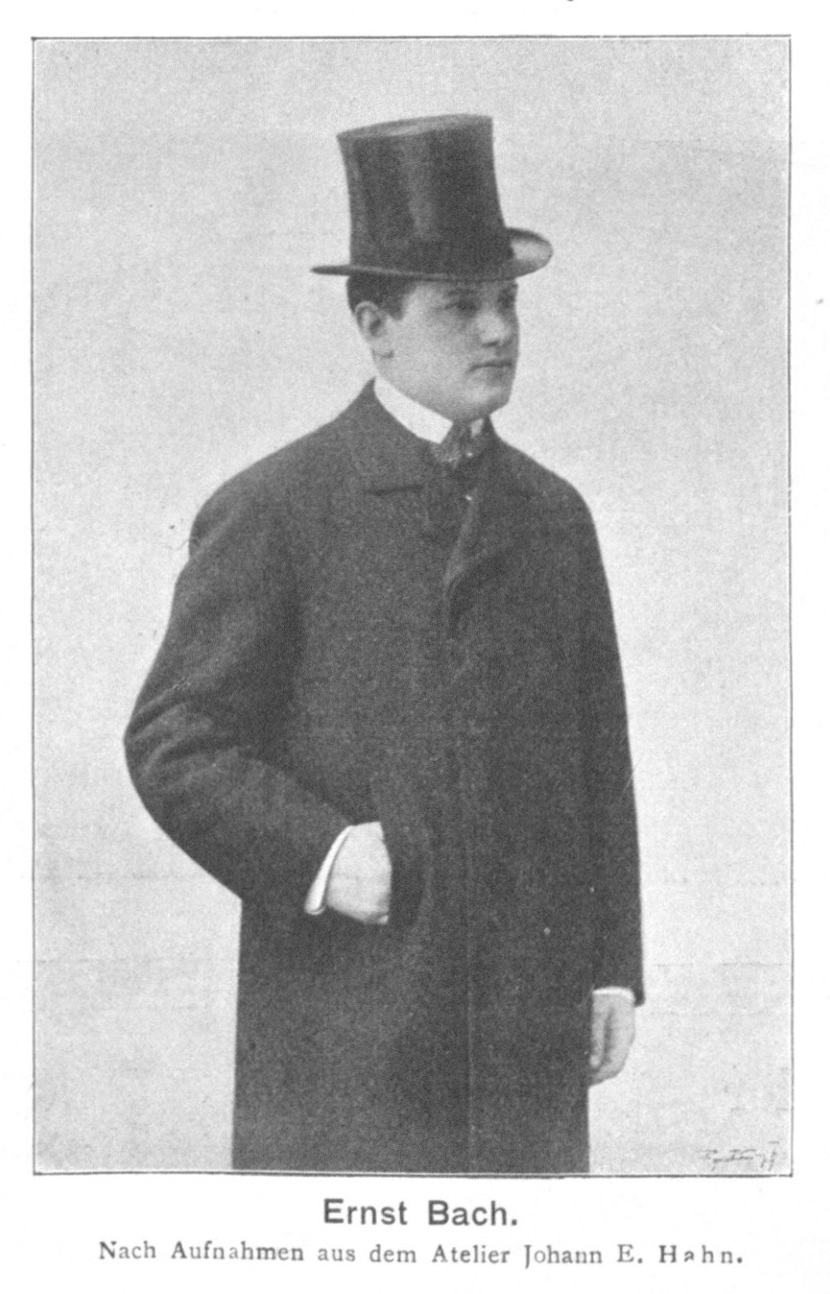
- Ernst Bach in Vienna in 1902
- Born: 10 May 1876; Cheb, Bohemia, Austria-Hungary
- Died: 1 November 1929 (aged 53); Munich, Germany
- Occupations: Actor, theatre manager and playwright
- Years active: 1900–1929

Ernst Bach (10 May 1876 – 1 November 1929) was an Austrian actor and playwright. He made his debut as an actor at the Raimund Theater in Vienna in 1899. In 1903 he moved to Berlin to the Residenz-Theater, then to the Lustspielhaus in 1905, where he became Regisseur in 1906 and in 1908 Oberregisseur.

In 1909 he started what was to become a 20-year partnership with Franz Arnold as a duo Arnold and Bach, with whom he wrote more than 20 plays, mainly farces and operettas. Their first hit play was The Spanish Fly in 1913. They went on to become one of the leading playwriting teams in Weimar Germany.

In 1917 he became the director of the Münchner Volkstheater in Munich, whilst continuing his writing partnership with Franz Arnold at Starnberg. He remained in Munich until his death in 1929.

== Plays by Arnold and Bach ==
- The Spanish Fly (1913, schwank in three acts)
- Die schwebende Jungfrau (1916, schwank in three acts)
- Die Fahrt ins Glück (1916, operetta in three acts, music by Jean Gilbert)
- Die bessere Hälfte (1917, schwank in five acts)
- Fräulein Puck (1919, Vaudeville, music by Walter Kollo)
- Das Jubiläum (1920, Lustspiel (a form of comedy) in three acts)
- Zwangseinquartierung (1920, military schwank in fife acts)
- Der keusche Lebemann (1921, schwank in three acts)
- Die Königin der Nacht (1921, musical schwank (operetta), music by Walter Kollo)
- Der kühne Schwimmer (1922, schwank in three acts)
- Dolly (1923, operetta in three acts, music by Hugo Hirsch)
- Der Fürst von Pappenheim (1923, operetta in three acts, music by Hugo Hirsch, English title: Toni)
- Die vertagte Nacht (1924, schwank in three acts)
- Der wahre Jakob (1924, schwank in three acts)
- Die vertauschte Frau (1924, Operetta, music by Walter Kollo)
- Olly-Polly (1925, operetta in three acts, music by Walter Kollo)
- Stöpsel (1926, schwank in three acts)
- Hurra, ein Junge (1926, schwank in three acts)
- Unter Geschäftsaufsicht (1927, schwank in three acts)
- Arme Ritter (1928, Operetta, music by Walter Kollo)
- Weekend im Paradies (1928, schwank in three acts)
- Hulla Di Bulla (1929, schwank in three acts)
- Frauen haben das gern (1931 operetta-farce by Walter Kollo, libretto by Arnold and Bach, based on Der keusche Lebemann

== Arnold and Bach filmography ==
- The Whole Town's Talking (1926, based on the play The Whole Town's Talking by Anita Loos and John Emerson, which is based on Der keusche Lebemann)
- The Prince of Pappenheim (1927, based on Der Fürst von Pappenheim)
- A Warm Corner (1930, based on Stöpsel)
- The True Jacob (1931, based on Der wahre Jakob)
- Ex-Bad Boy (1931, based on the play The Whole Town's Talking by Anita Loos and John Emerson, which is based on Der keusche Lebemann)
- The Soaring Maiden (1931, based on Die schwebende Jungfrau)
- Weekend in Paradise (1931, based on Weekend im Paradies)
- Business Under Distress (1931, based on Unter Geschäftsaufsicht)
- Hooray, It's a Boy! (1931, based on Hurra, ein Junge)
- The Spanish Fly (1931)
- The Night Without Pause (1931, based on Der keusche Lebemann)
- Wehe, wenn er losgelassen (1932, based on Unter Geschäftsaufsicht)
- A Thousand for One Night (1933, based on Stöpsel)
- Tisíc za jednu noc (1933, based on Stöpsel)
- The Dangerous Game (1933, based on Unter Geschäftsaufsicht)
- It's a Boy (1933, based on Hurra, ein Junge)
- The Daring Swimmer (1934, based on Der kühne Schwimmer)
- Oh, Daddy! (1935, based on Der wahre Jakob)
- The Interrupted Honeymoon (1936, based on Die vertagte Nacht)
- Oh, Such a Night! (1937, based on Die vertagte Nacht)
- Pappas pojke (1937, based on The Spanish Fly)
- One Night Apart (1950, based on Der wahre Jakob)
- The Prince of Pappenheim (1952, based on Der Fürst von Pappenheim)
- The Chaste Libertine (1952, based on Der keusche Lebemann)
- Weekend in Paradise (1952, based on Weekend im Paradies)
- Josef the Chaste (1953, based on Unter Geschäftsaufsicht)
- The Postponed Wedding Night (1953, based on Die vertagte Nacht)
- Hooray, It's a Boy! (1953, based on Hurra, ein Junge)
- The Spanish Fly (1955)
- The Daring Swimmer (1957, based on Der kühne Schwimmer)
- The True Jacob (1960, based on Der wahre Jakob)
- Ach Egon! (1961, based on Hurra, ein Junge)
- To gelio vgike ap' ton Paradeiso (1963, based on Der keusche Lebemann)
- Den kyske levemand (1974, based on Der keusche Lebemann)

== Bibliography ==
- Grange, William. Historical Dictionary of German Literature to 1945. Scarecrow Press, 2010.
