= One Night Apart =

1950 film

- Directed by: Hans Deppe
- Written by: Franz Arnold (play); Ernst Bach (play); Bobby E. Lüthge
- Produced by: Kurt Ulrich
- Starring: Kurt Seifert; Olga Chekhova; Sonja Ziemann
- Cinematography: Kurt Schulz
- Edited by: Margarete Steinborn
- Music by: Rudolf Nelson
- Production company: Berolina Film
- Distributed by: Gloria Film
- Release date: 10 February 1950
- Running time: 95 minutes
- Country: West Germany
- Language: German

One Night Apart (German: Eine Nacht im Separee) is a 1950 West German period comedy film directed by Hans Deppe and starring Kurt Seifert, Olga Chekhova and Sonja Ziemann. It was shot at the Tempelhof Studios in Berlin. The film's sets were designed by the art director Gabriel Pellon.

== Synopsis ==
In Berlin during pre-First World War era, a highly respectable figure arrives with his friend for a conference on public morality. However he quickly loses his head over a nightclub singer he encounters. His wife, concerned about her husband's welfare, arrives in the city soon afterwards.

== Cast ==
- Kurt Seifert as Heinrich Pogge
- Olga Chekhova as Vera, seine Frau
- Sonja Ziemann as Käthe
- Gretl Schörg as Musette, Sängerin
- Paul Hörbiger as Ferdinand Graf Lilienstein
- Georg Thomalla as Udo
- Rudolf Schündler as Tobias Nickelmann
- Ernst Waldow as Bocknagel, Polizeirat
- Gerd Frickhöffer
- Martha Hübner as Anna, Dienstmädchen
- Otto Falvay as Tom Sylvester
- Erika von Thellmann as Amalie Eusebie
- Charlotta Bönstedt
- Franz Schafheitlin as Bürgermeister
- Edith Karin as Vorsteherin des Amalienstifts
- Franz-Otto Krüger as Herr Schlüsemann

== See also ==
- The True Jacob (1931)
- Oh, Daddy! (1935)
- The True Jacob (1960)

== Bibliography ==
- Willi Höfig. Der deutsche Heimatfilm 1947–1960. 1973.
