= Bob's Your Uncle (musical) =

1948 British musical

Bob's Your Uncle is a 1948 British musical comedy with music by Noel Gay, lyrics by Frank Eyton, and a book by Austin Melford.

After premiering at the Royal Court Theatre in Liverpool, its West End run at the Saville Theatre lasted for 363 performances, between 5 May 1948 and 19 March 1949. The work was designed as a vehicle for the comedian Leslie Henson, who also co-produced it. The cast included Vera Pearce.

== Bibliography ==
- Wearing, J.P. The London Stage 1940-1949: A Calendar of Productions, Performers, and Personnel. Rowman & Littlefield, 2014.
