= Ethel Hansa =

American opera vocalist

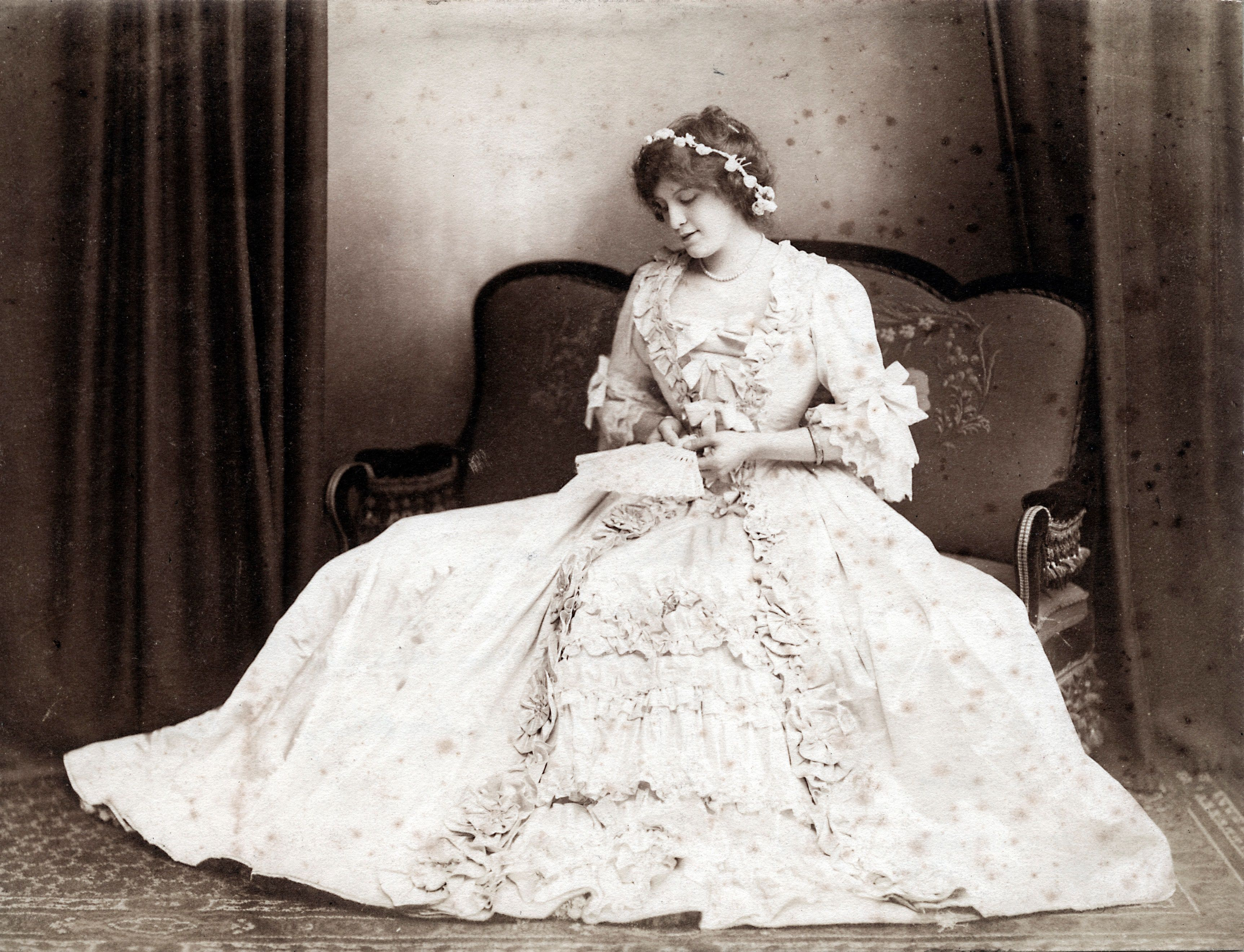
- Ethel Hansa (1912)
- Born: Ethel M. Parker; September 10, 1884; Philadelphia, Pennsylvania, U.S.
- Died: after 1950
- Occupation: Opera singer

Ethel M. Parker Hansa (September 10, 1884 – after 1952) was an American-born opera vocalist, a soprano, active in Germany during the 1910s and 1920s.

== Early life ==
Ethel M. Parker was born in Philadelphia, the daughter of George L. Parker Sr. and Hattie M. Barber Parker. She studied voice with Mathilde Marchesi in Paris, with further studies in Vienna and Berlin.

== Career ==
Hansa sang with the Berlin State Opera from 1914 to 1925. She was "one of the few American singers who elected to remain in Berlin during the troublous times of war", noted Musical America in 1915. Some of her roles included Gilda in Rigoletto, Rosina in Paisiello's The Barber of Seville, Mimi in La bohème, Cio-Cio-San in Madama Butterfly, Filina in Mignon, Olympia in The Tales of Hoffmann, the title role in Martha, Nuri in Tiefland, Queen of the Night in The Magic Flute, and Sophie in Der Rosenkavalier. She appeared in one German silent film, Die Hochzeit im Excentricclub (Wedding at the Eccentric Club, 1917). She sang on a German recording of Beethoven's Ninth Symphony in 1923.

Hansa, who retained her U.S. citizenship, stayed in Germany during both World Wars. She worked as a secretary at the Ninth Air Force headquarters in Bad Kissingen in the immediate aftermath of World War II. She taught music in Montgomery County, Pennsylvania, later in the 1940s.

== Personal life ==
Ethel Parker married electrical engineer Arthur Victor Hansa in 1907; he was born in Graz, Austria. They had a son, George Arthur Hansa, born in Philadelphia in 1908. They later divorced. She returned to the United States in 1946. She was listed as a survivor in her father's obituary in 1951.
