= The Prince of Pappenheim (1952 film) =

1952 film

- Directed by: Hans Deppe
- Written by: Franz Arnold (play); Ernst Bach (play); Walter F. Fichelscher; Bobby E. Lüthge
- Starring: Viktor de Kowa; Hannelore Schroth; Grethe Weiser
- Cinematography: Karl Löb; Fritz Arno Wagner
- Edited by: Walter Wischniewsky
- Music by: Hugo Hirsch; Heinrich Riethmüller
- Production company: Central-Europa Film
- Distributed by: Prisma Film
- Release date: 23 June 1952
- Running time: 104 minutes
- Country: West Germany
- Language: German

The Prince of Pappenheim (German: Der Fürst von Pappenheim) is a 1952 West German comedy film directed by Hans Deppe and starring Viktor de Kowa, Hannelore Schroth and Grethe Weiser. It was based on a 1923 operetta of the same name which had previously been made into a 1927 silent film.

It was shot at the Spandau Studios in West Berlin and on location in Baden-Württemberg. The film's sets were designed by Emil Hasler and Walter Kutz.

== Cast ==
- Viktor de Kowa as Egon Fürst
- Hannelore Schroth as Stefanie Vernon
- Grethe Weiser as Madeleine Pappenheim
- Georg Thomalla as Charly Rosner
- Ina Halley as Valerie
- Oskar Sima as Leo Ganitschef
- Käthe Haack as Baronin von Meersburg-Greiffenstein
- Siegfried Breuer as Juan Pablo de Gonzales
- Edith Schollwer as Mizzi Reisner
- Victor Janson as Direktor Mellini
- Gretl Theimer as Zarina
- Otto Braml as Lawyer de Monza
- Kurt Vespermann as Bürgermeister
- Walter Gross as Reklamechef Blumann
- Franz-Otto Krüger as Alfons
- Joe Furtner as Amtsdiener
- Heinz Lingen
- Liselotte Köster as Dancer
- Jockel Stahl as Dancer

== Bibliography ==
- Goble, Alan. The Complete Index to Literary Sources in Film. Walter de Gruyter, 1999.
