= Willy the Private Detective =

1960 film

- Directed by: Rudolf Schündler
- Written by: Gustav Kampendonk
- Produced by: Alexander Grüter
- Starring: Willy Millowitsch; Renate Mannhardt; Rudolf Platte
- Cinematography: Bruno Mondi
- Edited by: Walter von Bonhorst
- Music by: Martin Böttcher
- Production company: Corona Filmproduktion
- Distributed by: UFA
- Release date: 15 December 1960
- Running time: 88 minutes
- Country: West Germany
- Language: German

Willy the Private Detective (German: Willy, der Privatdetektiv) is a 1960 West German comedy film directed by Rudolf Schündler and starring Willy Millowitsch, Renate Mannhardt and Rudolf Platte. The film's sets were designed by the art directors Hanns Kuhnert and Max Vorwerg.

== Cast ==
- Willy Millowitsch as Willy Nölles
- Renate Mannhardt as Erna Knörschkes
- Rudolf Platte as Gottfried Bohnen
- Claus Biederstaedt as Dr. Werner Meyer
- Gusti Wolf as Mariechen
- Franz Schneider as Juppi Wenders
- Lotti Krekel as Elli Nölles
- Hannelore Auer as Helga Dobbelmann
- Emmy Burg as Frau Schürenberg
- Friedrich Schoenfelder as Direktor Schieske
- Harry Hardt as Direktor Dobbelmann
- Kurt Großkurth as Ernst Abelmann
- Klaus Dahlen as Walter Schneppe
- Käte Jaenicke as Köchin
- Egon Brosig as Polizeipräsident
- Anneliese Hartnack as Frau des Polizeipräsidenten
- Rolf Weih as Dr. Oliver
- Barbara Saade as Vera - Helgas Freundin

== Bibliography ==
- Bock, Hans-Michael & Bergfelder, Tim. The Concise CineGraph. Encyclopedia of German Cinema. Berghahn Books, 2009.
