= Albert Burdon =

British actor and comedian (1900–1981)

- Born: 4 July 1900; South Shields, County Durham, England
- Died: 13 April 1981 (aged 80); South Shields, England
- Occupation(s): Actor, comedian
- Spouse: Violet Spurgin (m.1933–1972)
- Children: Bryan Burdon and Paula Burdon

Albert Burdon (4 July 1900–13 April 1981) was a British actor and comedian,

He was born in South Shields, County Durham. He started his career playing in provincial revues, and was spotted by C. B. Cochran who gave him a part in the Rodgers and Hart musical Ever Green at the Adelphi Theatre in London in 1930.

Although he was described by Roy Hudd as "a master of physical comedy", Burdon never became a star in London, though he did take prominent roles in a series of pantomimes at the Lyceum Theatre in the 1930s. He made nine films, including It's a Boy (1933), and continued to perform on stage until the late 1950s, in later years with his son, Bryan Burdon.

== Personal life and death ==
Burdon married Violet Spurgin in 1933. The marriage produced two children. His son Bryan Burdon became an actor and his daughter Paula Burdon became a TV Producer. Albert Burdon died in South Shields in 1981, aged 80.

== Filmography ==
- The Maid of the Mountains (1932)
- Letting in the Sunshine (1933)
- It's a Boy (1933)
- Heat Wave (1935)
- She Knew What She Wanted (1936)
- Oh Boy! (1938)
- Luck of the Navy (1938)
- Jailbirds (1940)
