= The Soaring Maiden =

1931 film directed by Carl Boese

- Directed by: Carl Boese
- Written by: Franz Arnold (play); Ernst Bach (play); Max Jungk
- Produced by: Max Glass; Kurt Reichmann
- Starring: Lissy Arna; S.Z. Sakall; Dina Gralla
- Cinematography: Reimar Kuntze
- Music by: Mihály Eisemann
- Production company: Max Glass Filmproduktion
- Distributed by: Kristall-Film
- Release date: 17 September 1931
- Running time: 88 minutes
- Country: Germany
- Language: German

The Soaring Maiden (German: Die schwebende Jungfrau) is a 1931 German comedy film directed by Carl Boese and starring Lissy Arna, S.Z. Sakall and Dina Gralla. It was shot at the Halensee Studios in Berlin. The film's sets were designed by the art director Franz Schroedter.

== Cast ==
- Lissy Arna as Sonja, Detektivin
- S.Z. Sakall as Onkel Lampe
- Dina Gralla as Strandnixe
- Fritz Schulz as Paul Brandt, Lawyer
- Paul Kemp as Dr. Kurt Winter
- Fee Malten as Lilly, Elses Schwester
- Hilde von Stolz as Else Brandt, Ehefrau
- Adele Sandrock as Tante Malchen
- Kurt Lilien as Kriminalkommissar
- Max Ehrlich
- Vicky Werckmeister
- Paul Westermeier

== Bibliography ==
- Klaus, Ulrich J. Deutsche Tonfilme: Jahrgang 1931. Klaus-Archiv, 2006.
- Waldman, Harry. Nazi Films in America, 1933-1942. McFarland, 2008.
