= Oh, Daddy! =

1935 film

- Directed by: Graham Cutts; Austin Melford
- Written by: Austin Melford; Michael Powell
- Based on: The True Jacob by Franz Arnold and Ernst Bach
- Produced by: Michael Balcon
- Starring: Leslie Henson; Frances Day; Robertson Hare
- Cinematography: Mutz Greenbaum
- Edited by: Charles Frend
- Music by: Bretton Byrd; Louis Levy
- Production company: Gainsborough Pictures
- Distributed by: Gaumont British Distributors
- Release date: 6 May 1935
- Running time: 77 minutes
- Country: United Kingdom
- Language: English

Oh, Daddy! is a 1935 British comedy film directed by Graham Cutts and Austin Melford and starring Leslie Henson, Frances Day, Robertson Hare, and Barry MacKay. It was written by Melford and Michael Powell based on the 1924 play The True Jacob (Der wahre Jakob) by Franz Arnold and Ernst Bach. It was made at Islington Studios in London with sets designed by the art director Ernő Metzner.

== Cast ==
- Leslie Henson as Lord Pye
- Frances Day as Benita de Lys
- Robertson Hare as Rupert Boddy
- Barry MacKay as Jimmy Ellison
- Marie Lohr as Lady Pye
- Alfred Drayton as Uncle Samson
- Tony De Lungo as Count Duval
- Daphne Courtney as Phillis Pye
- Cyril Smith as Alfred, the butler
- Victor Rietti as hotel manager

== Reception ==
The Monthly Film Bulletin wrote: "A highly entertaining comedy, which moves along swiftly. The story is a good one, with a couple of bright musical numbers. An excellent all-round cast."

Kine Weekly wrote: "Broad farcical comedy extravaganza, elaborately built to an ever popular design and flavored with piquant cabaret spectacle. The plot makes a capital vehicle for Leslie Henson and the imprint of his inimitable humour leaves a happy mark on the lively comedy situations. The treatment and direction are too commonplace to equip the film for the highest honors, but its frank ingenious humour, good production qualities, smart teamwork and star values combine to make it an attractive comedy bet for the crowd."

== See also ==
- The True Jacob (1931)
- One Night Apart (1950)
- The True Jacob (1960)
