= Frank Eyton =

English lyricist (1894–1962)

Frank Eyton (30 August 1894 – 11 November 1962) was an English popular music lyricist best known for co-writing the lyrics of Johnny Green's "Body and Soul" (1930) with Edward Heyman and Robert Sour.

Most of Eyton's work was collaborations with Noel Gay and Billy Mayerl in London-based musical theatre. With Mayerl as composer, Eyton co-wrote with Desmond Carter the lyrics for the celebrated sequence "Side by Side" from Over She Goes (filmed 1938). His most successful play was the 1948 musical farce, Bob's Your Uncle, written in collaboration with Gay.

With Gay, Eyton wrote the popular song "All Over The Place" for the 1940 film Sailors Three and the songs for the 1942 film Let the People Sing. He was also one of the soundtrack writers of Body and Soul, a successful boxing film from 1947.
