= Wedding in the Eccentric Club =

- Directed by: Joe May
- Written by: Fritz Lang; Joe May
- Produced by: Joe May
- Starring: Harry Liedtke; Käthe Haack; Bruno Kastner
- Cinematography: Carl Hoffmann
- Production company: May-Film
- Release date: 27 April 1917
- Country: Germany
- Languages: Silent; German intertitles

Wedding in the Eccentric Club (German: Die Hochzeit im Excentricclub) is a 1917 German silent crime action film directed by Joe May and starring Harry Liedtke, Käthe Haack and Bruno Kastner. It was part of the long-running series of Joe Deebs detective films.

== Cast ==
- Harry Liedtke as Joe Deebs
- Käthe Haack as Junges Mädchen, van Hoops Tochter
- Bruno Kastner as van Hoops Neffe, der Erbe
- Magda Madeleine
- Esther Carena
- Ethel Hansa as
- Hermann Picha
- Wilhelm von Haxthausen
- Paul Westermeier

== Bibliography ==
- Thomas, Douglas B. The Early History of German Motion Pictures, 1895-1935. Thomas International, 1999.
