= Franz Arnold =

German actor and playwright (1878–1960)

- Born: 28 April 1878; Znin, Prussia, German Empire
- Died: 29 September 1960 (aged 82); London, England, United Kingdom
- Occupations: Actor, Writer

Franz Arnold (1878–1960) was a German actor and playwright. He frequently collaborated with Ernst Bach as a duo Arnold and Bach after their debut play The Spanish Fly was a hit. He emigrated to Britain in 1933.

== Plays by Arnold and Bach ==
- The Spanish Fly (1913)
- Die schwebende Jungfrau (1916)
- Die Fahrt ins Glück (1916, Operetta, music by Jean Gilbert)
- Die bessere Hälfte (1917)
- Fräulein Puck (1919, Vaudeville, music by Walter Kollo)
- Das Jubiläum (1920)
- Zwangseinquartierung (1920)
- Der keusche Lebemann (1921)
- Die Königin der Nacht (1921, Operetta, music by Walter Kollo)
- Der kühne Schwimmer (1922)
- Dolly (1923, Operetta, music by Hugo Hirsch)
- Der Fürst von Pappenheim (1923, Operetta, music by Hugo Hirsch, English title: Toni)
- Die vertagte Nacht (1924)
- Der wahre Jakob (1924)
- Die vertauschte Frau (1924, Operetta, music by Walter Kollo)
- Olly-Polly (1925, Operetta, music by Walter Kollo)
- Stöpsel (1926)
- Hurra, ein Junge (1926)
- Unter Geschäftsaufsicht (1927)
- Arme Ritter (1928, Operetta, music by Walter Kollo)
- Weekend im Paradies (1928)
- Hulla Di Bulla (1929)
- Frauen haben das gern (1931 operetta-farce by Walter Kollo, libretto by Arnold and Bach, based on Der keusche Lebemann

== Plays by Franz Arnold ==
- Mein alter Herr (with Victor Arnold, 1913)
- Das Fräulein vom Amt (with Georg Okonkowski, 1916, Operetta, music by Jean Gilbert)
- Das öffentliche Ärgernis (1931)
- Da stimmt was nicht (1932)
- Rise and Shine (with Robert Gilbert, 1936, Operetta, music by Robert Stolz. English adaptation by Harry Graham and Desmond Carter)

== Arnold and Bach filmography ==
- The Whole Town's Talking (1926, based on the play The Whole Town's Talking by Anita Loos and John Emerson, which is based on Der keusche Lebemann)
- The Prince of Pappenheim (1927, based on Der Fürst von Pappenheim)
- A Warm Corner (1930, based on Stöpsel)
- The True Jacob (1931, based on Der wahre Jakob)
- Ex-Bad Boy (1931, based on the play The Whole Town's Talking by Anita Loos and John Emerson, which is based on Der keusche Lebemann)
- The Soaring Maiden (1931, based on Die schwebende Jungfrau)
- Weekend in Paradise (1931, based on Weekend im Paradies)
- Business Under Distress (1931, based on Unter Geschäftsaufsicht)
- Hooray, It's a Boy! (1931, based on Hurra, ein Junge)
- The Spanish Fly (1931)
- The Night Without Pause (1931, based on Der keusche Lebemann)
- Wehe, wenn er losgelassen (1932, based on Unter Geschäftsaufsicht)
- A Thousand for One Night (1933, based on Stöpsel)
- Tisíc za jednu noc (1933, based on Stöpsel)
- The Dangerous Game (1933, based on Unter Geschäftsaufsicht)
- It's a Boy (1933, based on Hurra, ein Junge)
- The Daring Swimmer (1934, based on Der kühne Schwimmer)
- Oh, Daddy! (1935, based on Der wahre Jakob)
- The Interrupted Honeymoon (1936, based on Die vertagte Nacht)
- Oh, Such a Night! (1937, based on Die vertagte Nacht)
- Pappas pojke (1937, based on The Spanish Fly)
- One Night Apart (1950, based on Der wahre Jakob)
- The Prince of Pappenheim (1952, based on Der Fürst von Pappenheim)
- The Chaste Libertine (1952, based on Der keusche Lebemann)
- Weekend in Paradise (1952, based on Weekend im Paradies)
- Josef the Chaste (1953, based on Unter Geschäftsaufsicht)
- The Postponed Wedding Night (1953, based on Die vertagte Nacht)
- Hooray, It's a Boy! (1953, based on Hurra, ein Junge)
- The Spanish Fly (1955)
- The Daring Swimmer (1957, based on Der kühne Schwimmer)
- The True Jacob (1960, based on Der wahre Jakob)
- Ach Egon! (1961, based on Hurra, ein Junge)
- To gelio vgike ap' ton Paradeiso (1963, based on Der keusche Lebemann)
- Den kyske levemand (1974, based on Der keusche Lebemann)

== Franz Arnold filmography ==
- Sein Scheidungsgrund (screenplay, with Max Jungk, 1931)
- Da stimmt was nicht (1934)
- Public Nuisance No. 1 (Story idea, 1936)
- The Wedding Trip (1936, based on Da stimmt was nicht)
- Skandal um Dodo (1959, based on Das öffentliche Ärgernis)

== Bibliography ==
- Grange, William. Historical Dictionary of German Literature to 1945. Scarecrow Press, 2010.
