= The House Without Men =

1928 film

- Directed by: Rolf Randolf
- Written by: Curt J. Braun; Max Ehrlich
- Starring: Ossi Oswalda; Iwa Wanja; Ida Renard
- Cinematography: Alfred Hansen
- Production company: Olympia Film
- Distributed by: Deutsch-Russische Film-Allianz
- Release date: 4 December 1928
- Country: Germany
- Languages: Silent; German intertitles

The House Without Men (German: Das Haus ohne Männer) is a 1928 German silent comedy film directed by Rolf Randolf and starring Ossi Oswalda, Iwa Wanja and Ida Renard.

The film's art direction was by Heinrich Richter.

== Cast ==
- Ossi Oswalda as Eva
- Iwa Wanja as Friedel
- Ida Renard as Elisa
- Valeria Blanka as Tamara
- Ibolya Szekely as Marianne
- Livio Pavanelli as Ralf
- Hans Brausewetter as Lothar
- Fritz Kampers as Der Nachtwächter
- Gyula Szőreghy as Der Direktor
- Bruno Arno as Der Tanzmeister
- Trude Lehmann as Die Köchin

== Bibliography ==
- Alfred Krautz. International directory of cinematographers, set- and costume designers in film, Volume 4. Saur, 1984.
