= Grayce Hampton =

British actress (1876–1963)

- Born: 28 March 1876; Devon, United Kingdom
- Died: 20 December 1963 (aged 87); Los Angeles, California, U.S.
- Other name: Grace Hampton
- Occupation: Actress
- Years active: 1916–1953 (film)
- Spouse: Charles Dodsworth

Grayce Hampton (28 March 1876 – 20 December 1963) was a British film and stage actress. Her name was often seen as Grace Hampton.

Hampton studied at a convent in Brussels, and a teacher there introduced her to Augustus Harris, who arranged for her to perform in one of his productions. After that, she acted in other Harris productions at the Drury Lane Theater in London.

Hampton emigrated to the United States with Henry Irving's production of Robespierre. She found work on Broadway and then in Hollywood as a film actress in generally character roles such as the 1932 comedy The Unexpected Father.

Broadway plays in which Hampton appeared included Suspect (1940), Point Valaine (1935), Her Majesty the Widow (1934), Gentlemen Prefer Blondes (1926), Easy Virtue (1925), Antony and Cleopatra (1924), Pelleas and Melisande (1923), Romeo and Juliet (1923), Malvaloca (1922), and Fall and Rise of Susan Lenox (1920).

Hampton performed in vaudeville with Otis Skinner.

Hampton was married to English comedian Charles Dodsworth.

== Filmography ==
Year	Title	Role	Notes
1916	The Pursuing Vengeance	Countess Simone	
1930	The Bat Whispers	Miss Cornelia van Gorder	
1931	Ex-Bad Boy	Mrs. Simmons	
1931	Broadminded	Aunt Polly	
1932	The Unexpected Father	Mrs. Smythe	
1932	Stepping Sisters	Mrs. Donaldston	Uncredited
1932	Almost Married	Aunt Mathilda	Uncredited
1933	Looking Forward	Woman Buying Dog Basket	Uncredited
1935	Gigolette	Mrs. Emerson	
1936	Piccadilly Jim	Mrs. Brede	
1937	Souls at Sea	Old Knitting Woman	Uncredited
1939	The Women	Dowager in Powder Room	Uncredited
1939	Rio	Minor Role	Uncredited
1941	The Shanghai Gesture	The Social Leader	
1943	Heaven Can Wait	Albert's Mother	Uncredited
1944	Standing Room Only	Guest at Ritchie Home	Uncredited
1944	Ministry of Fear	Lady with Floppy Hat	Uncredited
1944	Abroad with Two Yanks	Stuart's Party Guest	Uncredited
1944	Three Sisters of the Moors	Martha	Short
1944	Nothing but Trouble	Mrs. Herkheimer	Uncredited
1944	The Suspect	Margaret	Uncredited
1945	Her Highness and the Bellboy	Mrs. Chudduster	Uncredited
1945	Confidential Agent	Woman on Road	Uncredited
1945	Hold That Blonde	Mrs. Case	Uncredited
1946	Johnny Comes Flying Home	Mrs. Bixler	Uncredited
1946	Without Reservations	Lois	Uncredited
1946	Lady Luck	Woman in Bookshop	Uncredited
1947	Love and Learn	Mrs. Bronson	Uncredited
1947	Fun on a Weekend	Hotel Stenographer	Uncredited
1947	Down to Earth	Dowager	Uncredited
1947	The Exile	First Court Lady	
1948	Sitting Pretty	Mrs. Appleton	Uncredited
1948	April Showers	Dowager	Uncredited
1948	Silver River	Woman	Uncredited
1948	The Snake Pit	Inmate Countess	
1948	Trouble Preferred	Mrs. McGinnis - Landlady	Uncredited
1949	A Kiss in the Dark	Mrs. Stuyvedant	Uncredited
1949	Anna Lucasta	Queenie	Uncredited
1949	The Girl from Jones Beach	Party Guest	Uncredited
1949	Bride for Sale	Harriet Jonathan	Uncredited
1950	Kill the Umpire	Dowager	Uncredited
1950	Caged	Woman	Uncredited
1950	Love That Brute	Dowager	Uncredited
1950	Harvey	Mrs. Strickleberger	Uncredited
1951	The Mating Season	Mrs. Fahnstock	
1953	Forever Female	Olga O'Brien	Uncredited, (final film role)
