= Iwa Wanja =

Bulgarian actress (1905–1991)

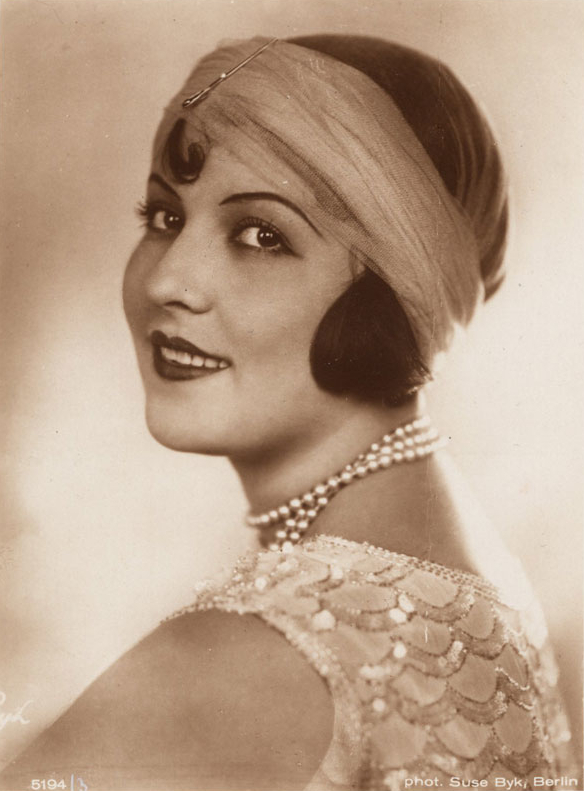
- Iwa Wanja by Suse Byk, 1920s
- Born: Ivanka Nikolova Yanakieva; 10 October 1905; Karnobat, Bulgaria
- Died: 26 June 1991 (aged 85); Berlin, Germany
- Occupation: Actress
- Years active: 1925–1954 (film)
- Spouse: Norbert Schultze (m. 1943)
- Children: Norbert Schultze Jr., Kristian Schultze

Iwa Wanja (born Ivanka Nikolova Yanakieva; 10 October 1905 – 26 June 1991) was a Bulgarian actress based in Germany. She moved to Berlin to pursue her career, appearing in around thirty German films. She was married to Norbert Schultze, German composer, best remembered for having written the melody of the World War II classic Lili Marleen.

== Life and career ==
In 1937, Wanja appeared in the Nazi propaganda film, Urlaub auf Ehrenwort (Holiday on Parole, also known as Furlough on Parole).

Sometime around 1943, she wed German film composer Norbert Arnold Wilhelm Richard Schultze. They had two sons, one of whom was musician Kristian Schultze. During their marriage, she penned the libretti for several of his compositions for the stage.

== Selected filmography ==
- Women of Luxury (1925)
- A Sister of Six (1926)
- The Woman's Crusade (1926)
- I Liked Kissing Women (1926)
- Weekend Magic (1927)
- The Long Intermission (1927)
- The Marriage Nest (1927)
- The Prince's Child (1927)
- Girls, Beware! (1928)
- The President (1928)
- The House Without Men (1928)
- Polish Economy (1928)
- Dear Homeland (1929)
- The Right of the Unborn (1929)
- From a Bachelor's Diary (1929)
- Josef the Chaste (1930)
- The Court Concert (1936)
- Captain Bay-Bay (1953)
- A Life for Do (1954)

== Bibliography ==
- Bernadette Kester. Film Front Weimar: Representations of the First World War in German Films of the Weimar Period (1919-1933). Amsterdam University Press, 2003.
