= Hooray, It's a Boy! (1953 film) =

1953 film

- Ingrid Lutz, Adrian Hoven and Friedl Hardt
- German: Hurra – ein Junge!
- Directed by: Ernst Marischka; Georg Jacoby
- Written by: Franz Arnold (play); Ernst Bach (play); Ernst Marischka
- Produced by: Kurt Ulrich
- Starring: Walter Müller; Theo Lingen; Ingrid Lutz
- Cinematography: Kurt Schulz
- Edited by: Hermann Leitner
- Music by: Peter Igelhoff
- Production company: Berolina Film
- Distributed by: Constantin Film
- Release date: 30 December 1953
- Running time: 90 minutes
- Country: West Germany
- Language: German

Hooray, It's a Boy! (German: Hurra – ein Junge!) is a 1953 West German comedy film directed by Ernst Marischka and Georg Jacoby and starring Walter Müller, Theo Lingen, and Ingrid Lutz. It is one of several film adaptations of the 1926 play of the same name.

It was shot at the Tempelhof Studios in Berlin. The film's sets were designed by Willi Herrmann and Heinrich Weidemann.

== Cast ==
- Walter Müller as Fritz Pappenstiel
- Theo Lingen as Prof. Waldemar Weber
- Ingrid Lutz as Henni
- Paul Westermeier as Theodor Nathusius
- Grethe Weiser as Mathilde
- Ingrid Pan as Olga
- Adrian Hoven as Dr. Kurt Wehling
- Friedl Hardt as Anni
- Ruth Lommel as Helga Lüders
- Erna Sellmer as Frau Lange
- Else Reval as Frau director Funk
- Das Cornell-Trio as singers
- Wolfgang Neuss
- Werner Müller and the RIAS Dance Orchestra

== See also ==
- Hooray, It's a Boy! (1931 film)
- It's a Boy (1933 film)
- Ach Egon! (1961 film)
