= The Spanish Fly (play) =

1913 German play

The Spanish Fly (Note: A "Spanish fly", or lytta vesicatoria, is neither Spanish, nor fly. It is a beetle, an extract from which was thought to be a strong aphrodisiac, and various love potions were named thus.) (German: Die spanische Fliege) is a 1913 German comedy play written by Franz Arnold and Ernst Bach. When it premiered Arnold himself played the male lead. It was the first of many successful collaborations between the two writers.

== Adaptations ==
It has been adapted for film and television several times including:

- The Spanish Fly, a 1931 film by Georg Jacoby
- The Spanish Fly, a 1955 film by Carl Boese.

== Bibliography ==
- Grange, William. Historical Dictionary of German Literature to 1945. Scarecrow Press, 2010.
