= The Daring Swimmer =

1934 film

- Film poster
- German: Der kühne Schwimmer
- Directed by: Georg Jacoby
- Written by: Franz Arnold (play, uncredited); Ernst Bach (play, uncredited); Walter Wassermann
- Starring: Ralph Arthur Roberts; Susi Lanner; Ida Wüst
- Cinematography: Herbert Körner
- Music by: Hanson Milde-Meissner
- Production company: Majestic-Film
- Distributed by: Tobis Film; Sascha Film (Austria)
- Release date: 28 August 1934
- Country: Germany
- Language: German

The Daring Swimmer (German: Der kühne Schwimmer) is a 1934 German comedy film directed by Georg Jacoby, starring Ralph Arthur Roberts, Susi Lanner, and Ida Wüst.

== Cast ==
- Ralph Arthur Roberts as Otto Eberlein
- Susi Lanner as Käthe
- Ida Wüst as Gabriele Degenhardt
- Elga Brink as Annemarie
- Harald Paulsen as Fritz Neubauer
- Erik Ode as Alfred Möbius
- Hugo Fischer-Köppe as Wernicke
- Gerhard Dammann
- Anna Müller-Lincke
- Gerti Ober
- Else Reval
- Willi Schaeffers
