= Josef the Chaste (1930 film) =

1930 film

- German film poster
- German: Der keusche Josef
- Directed by: Georg Jacoby
- Written by: Friedrich Raff; Julius Urgiß
- Starring: Harry Liedtke; Iwa Wanja; Elga Brink
- Cinematography: Willy Winterstein
- Music by: Anton Profes
- Production company: Deutsche Lichtspiel-Syndikat
- Distributed by: Deutsche Lichtspiel-Syndikat
- Release date: 19 September 1930
- Running time: 83 minutes
- Country: Germany
- Language: German

Josef the Chaste (German: Der keusche Josef) is a 1930 German comedy film directed by Georg Jacoby and starring Harry Liedtke, Iwa Wanja, and Elga Brink.

It shares its title with an unrelated 1953 film of the same name by Carl Boese.

== Cast ==
- Harry Liedtke as Juccundus von Müller
- Iwa Wanja as Irene
- Elga Brink as Thekla
- Ossi Oswalda as Kitty
- Grete Natzler as Lolotte
- Paul Heidemann as Hellmuth Heiligenstamm
- Henry Bender as August Müller
- Ida Wüst as Sylphide Schlump
- Felix Bressart as Eizes
- Paul Westermeier as Krause
