= The Postponed Wedding Night (1953 film) =

1953 film

- Directed by: Karl Georg Külb
- Written by: Franz Arnold (play); Ernst Bach (play); Karl Georg Külb; Willy Schatz
- Produced by: Jochen Genzow; Franz Seitz
- Starring: Margot Hielscher; Theo Lingen; Viktor Staal
- Cinematography: Ernst W. Kalinke
- Edited by: Walter Fredersdorf
- Music by: Friedrich Meyer
- Production company: Ariston Film
- Distributed by: Neue Filmverleih
- Release date: 2 July 1953
- Running time: 85 minutes
- Country: West Germany
- Language: German

The Postponed Wedding Night (German: Die vertagte Hochzeitsnacht) is a 1953 West German comedy film directed by Karl Georg Külb and starring Margot Hielscher, Theo Lingen and Viktor Staal. It was based on a play by Franz Arnold and Ernst Bach. It was shot at the Carlton Studios in Munich. The film's sets were designed by the art directors Willi Schatz and Arne Flekstad.

== Cast ==
- Margot Hielscher as Susi Dobermann
- Theo Lingen as Dr. Reinhold Zibelius
- Viktor Staal as Karlheinz Reiling
- Ingrid Lutz as Elli Ornelli
- Käthe Haack as Ida Dobermann
- Hans Leibelt as Emil Dobermann
- Dorit Kreysler as Mady
- Bum Krüger as Der stramme Max
- Paul Westermeier as Schellhase
- Steffie Stroux as Gabriele Zibelius
- Viktor Afritsch as Arturo
- Helmuth M. Backhaus as Ansager
- Fritz Lafontaine
- Gert Fröbe as Gondoliere
- Toni Treutler as Italienische Wirtin
- Wolf Harro
- Ellen Hille as Frau Lüdecke
- Anton Färber as Inspizient
- Ernestine Hochberger
- Fred Tanner

== Bibliography ==
- Goble, Alan. The Complete Index to Literary Sources in Film. Walter de Gruyter, 1999.
