= Weekend in Paradise (1952 film) =

1952 film

- Directed by: Kurt Hoffmann
- Written by: Reinhold Schünzel
- Based on: Weekend in Paradise by Franz Arnold & Ernst Bach
- Produced by: Franz Tappers
- Starring: Paul Dahlke; Margaret Cargill; Christiane Jansen
- Cinematography: Albert Benitz
- Edited by: Martha Dübber
- Music by: Hans-Martin Majewski
- Production companies: Fama-Film; Standard-Filmverleih
- Distributed by: Europa-Filmverleih
- Release date: 4 September 1952
- Running time: 85 minutes
- Country: West Germany
- Language: German

Weekend in Paradise (German: Wochenend im Paradies or Liebe im Finanzamt) is a 1952 West German comedy film directed by Kurt Hoffmann and starring Paul Dahlke, Margaret Cargill and Christiane Jansen. It was shot at the Wandsbek Studios in Hamburg and on location in Malente, Plön, Eutin and the Dieksee. The film's sets were designed by the art directors Willi Herrmann and Heinrich Weidemann. It is a remake of the 1931 film of the same title.

== Cast ==
- Paul Dahlke as Regierungsrat Dittjen
- Margaret Cargill as Vicky Dittjen
- Christiane Jansen as Olivia Dittjen
- Carola Höhn as Dr. Wilma Linde
- Carsta Löck as Adele Schild
- Walter Giller as Ewald Bach
- Helmuth M. Backhaus as Conferencier
- Stig Roland as Otto Giersdorf
- Harald Paulsen as Limonadenschulze
- Hubert von Meyerinck as Empfangschef
- Karin Jacobsen as Die Blonde
- Erich Ponto as Giersdorfs Onkel
- Hans Stiebner as August Badrian
- Udo Baustian as Hubs

== Bibliography ==
- Thomas Koebner. Filmregisseure: Biographien, Werkbeschreibungen, Filmographien. Reclam, 2008.
