= The Postponed Wedding Night (1924 film) =

1924 film

- Directed by: Josef Berger
- Cinematography: Franz Weihmayr
- Production company: Union-Film
- Release date: 1924
- Country: Germany
- Languages: Silent; German intertitles

The Postponed Wedding Night (German:Die vertagte Hochzeitsnacht) is a 1924 German silent comedy film directed by Josef Berger.

== Cast ==
- Claire Kronburger
