= It's a Boy (film) =

1933 film by Tim Whelan

- Trade advertisement
- German: Familientag im Hause Prellstein
- Directed by: Tim Whelan
- Written by: Austin Melford (play); Leslie Howard Gordon; John Paddy Carstairs; Ernst Bach; Franz Arnold
- Produced by: Michael Balcon
- Starring: Leslie Henson; Albert Burdon; Edward Everett Horton; Heather Thatcher
- Cinematography: Mutz Greenbaum
- Edited by: Harold M. Young
- Music by: Louis Levy
- Production company: Gainsborough Pictures
- Distributed by: Woolf & Freedman Film Service (UK); Gaumont British (US)
- Release date: 13 June 1933
- Running time: 80 minutes
- Country: United Kingdom
- Language: English

It's a Boy is a 1933 British comedy film directed by Tim Whelan and starring Leslie Henson, Albert Burdon and Edward Everett Horton. It was written by Leslie Howard Gordon and John Paddy Carstairs, based on the 1931 play It's a Boy by Austin Melford, an English adaption of the 1926 play Hurra, ein Junge by Ernst Bach and Franz Arnold . The sets were designed by the art director Alex Vetchinsky.

A blackmailer attempts to demand money from a young woman on the brink of marriage.

== Plot ==
On the eve of his society wedding, Dudley Leake and his best man James Skippett get drunk at his bachelor party. While in his cups Dudley confides to his friend about a brief fling he had with a woman just before the outbreak of the First World War in August 1914. The following morning they oversleep and are late for their wedding. While they are dressing themselves Joe Piper, a young man with a strong Northern accent, appears at the flat and claims to be Dudley's illegitimate son from his pre-war tryst.

The two men reject his claim, and leave him in the care of Allister the butler and hurry off to the wedding only to discover they have arrived too late. The ceremony has been postponed as the bride's family have gone. They hurry round to the Bogle household to try and justify their behaviour to Mary Bogle and her stern father. Rather than explain about being drunk, they claim they were called to an urgent business meeting and spend the rest of the day trying to produce a famous author "John Tempest" who they claim will provide them with an alibi about their late arrival.

Allister the butler, meanwhile, has been unable to prevent Joe Piper discovering about the wedding and he also heads to the Bogle household and begins demanding large sums of money from Dudley in exchange for keeping quiet about their relationship. Skippett then persuades Joe Piper to pretend to be Tempest unaware that in real life she is actually a woman, and one of the bride's guests at the wedding. They slowly dig themselves deeper and deeper into a hole, and the Bogles prepare to leave for a holiday in Southern France.

Eventually, after both Piper and Skippett have dressed up as women and pretended to be Tempest, the Bogles agree that Dudley can marry her daughter only for Piper to reveal to them that he was Dudley's "love child" when he is not paid the blackmail money he demands. The wedding is saved, however, when a police inspector arrives and reveals that Piper's real father is not Dudley but rather Mr Bogle who had also had a fling with his mother in 1914.

== Cast ==
- Leslie Henson as James Skippett
- Albert Burdon as Joe Piper
- Edward Everett Horton as Dudley Leake
- Heather Thatcher as Anita Gunn
- Alfred Drayton as Eustace Bogle
- Robertson Hare as Allister
- Wendy Barrie as Mary Bogle
- Helen Haye as Mrs. Bogle
- Joyce Kirby as Lillian, the maid
- Finlay Currie as publisher
- J.H. Roberts as Registrar

== Reception ==
Kine Weekly wrote: "Carefree comedy, a straightforward adaptation of the stage success, which takes a little time to get into its stride, but once it gets going fully develops the true spirit of farce and plays it in the liveliest key. The entanglements from which the laughable situations are derived and handled with infectious enthusiasm by the experienced players, Leslie Henson, Albert Burdon and Edward Everett Horton, and their inimitable methods provide the necessary humorous contrasts. The supporting team work is sound, the production good, and the direction competent."

Picture Show wrote: "With Leslie Henson, Edward Everett Horton and Alfred Drayton in the cast, it goes without saying that this picture is a sure laughter maker. The plot rests on one false step made by a bachelor, and it leads to so many complicated situations that the fun never lags. As fast is one trouble is cleared up another arises, and so it goes on to the end."

== See also ==
- Hooray, It's a Boy! (1931)
- Hooray, It's a Boy! (1953)
- Ach Egon! (1961)
