= Weekend in Paradise (1931 film) =

1931 film

- French release poster
- Directed by: Robert Land
- Written by: Franz Arnold and Ernst Bach (play), Ernst Neubach
- Starring: Trude Berliner; Claire Rommer; Julius Falkenstein
- Cinematography: Willy Goldberger; Robert Lach
- Music by: Hans May
- Production company: Deutsche Lichtspiel-Syndikat
- Release date: 13 October 1931
- Running time: 84 minutes
- Country: Germany
- Language: German

Weekend in Paradise (German: Weekend im Paradies) is a 1931 German musical comedy film directed by Robert Land and starring Trude Berliner, Claire Rommer, and Julius Falkenstein. It was remade in 1952.

The film's art direction was by Robert Neppach and Erwin Scharf.

== Cast ==
- Otto Wallburg as Regierungsrat Dittchen
- Claire Rommer as Hedwig, Dittchens Frau
- Julius Falkenstein as Ministerialdirektor Dr. Grimeisen
- Walter Steinbeck as Ministerialrat Breitenbach
- Anton Pointner as Oberregierungsrat von Giersdorf
- Wolf von Rothberg as Regierungsassessor Winkler
- Aenne Goerling as Adele Haubenschildt, Landtagsabgeordnete
- Trude Berliner as Tutti, Animierdame
- Else Elster as Lore Dietrich, Stenotypistin
- Hans Halden as Wuttke, Bürodiener
- Franz Weber as Seidel, Kriminalwachtmeister
- Hans Hermann Schaufuß as Badrian, Villenbesitzer
- Paul Westermeier as Brose, Diener im "Hotel Paradies"
- Kurt Lilien as Löffler, Portier
- Eva L'Arronge as Olly
- Siegfried Breuer as Schmidt

== Plot ==
Hard-working civil servant Dittchen hasn't been promoted for years. Colleagues pass all the work on to him. He gets a visit from state parliamentarian Haubenschildt, who complains about immoral goings-on in the weekend hotel "Paradies". Dittchen takes this as an opportunity to investigate the hotel. There he discovers all his superiors. Because nobody wants to be listed in the official report, Dittchen is urged to remove the names of his superiors from the files. In return, he is promoted several times.

== Bibliography ==
- Günther Dahlke & Günter Karl. Deutsche Spielfilme von den Anfängen bis 1933: ein Filmführer. Henschelverlag Kunst und Gesellschaft, 1988.
