= Bob's Yer Uncle (band) =

Alternative rock band

Bob's Yer Uncle is a rock band founded in 1995 based in Chicago, Illinois. It has been described as, "rhythms ... are complex but do have a toe-tapping groove to them, and the vocals hide the darker tone of the lyrics in their simple beauty."

== Regular members ==
- Adrian Matthews – lead vocals, acoustic and electric guitars
- Bill Henshell – 6 and 12 string electric and acoustic guitars, mandolin, bass, vocals
- Jaxon – percussion
- Paul Young – 4, 5, and 8 string basses
- Phil Barish – piano, organ and synthesizers, vocals

== Discography ==
- 1999 - Innocence and Experience
- 2012 - Xplod-i-mite
