= The True Jacob (1960 film) =

1960 film

- Directed by: Rudolf Schündler
- Written by: Gustav Kampendonk; Ernst Bach (play); Franz Arnold (play)
- Produced by: Alexander Grüter
- Starring: Willy Millowitsch; Renate Ewert; Jane Tilden
- Cinematography: Bruno Mondi
- Edited by: Elisabeth Pewny; Ilse Voigt
- Music by: Peter Igelhoff
- Production company: Corona Filmproduktion
- Distributed by: UFA
- Release date: 11 August 1960
- Running time: 88 minutes
- Country: West Germany
- Language: German

The True Jacob (German: Der wahre Jakob) is a 1960 West German comedy film directed by Rudolf Schündler and starring Willy Millowitsch, Renate Ewert and Jane Tilden. It is a remake of a German film from 1931.

== Cast ==
- Willy Millowitsch as Peter Struwe
- Renate Ewert as Yvette
- Jane Tilden as Frau Struwe
- Astrid Frank as Lotte Struwe
- Hans von Borsody as Fred
- Hans Leibelt as Eduard Struwe
- Hans Olden as Von Schöberl
- Gunnar Möller as Jimmy
- Lotti Krekel as Lisa
- Franz Schneider as Böcklein
- Marlene Warrlich
- Käte Alving
- Lotti Alberti
- Barbara Daniszewski
- Manfred Schaeffer

== See also ==
- The True Jacob (1931)
- Oh, Daddy! (1935)
- One Night Apart (1950)

== Bibliography ==
- Goble, Alan. The Complete Index to Literary Sources in Film. Walter de Gruyter, 1999.
