= Tons of Money (1924 film) =

British silent comedy film

- Directed by: Frank Hall Crane
- Written by: Tom Webster; Lucita Squier
- Produced by: Leslie Henson; Tom Walls
- Starring: Leslie Henson; Flora le Breton; Mary Brough
- Cinematography: Bert Cann
- Edited by: Tom Webster
- Production companies: Walls & Henson
- Distributed by: Stoll Pictures
- Release date: March 1924
- Country: United Kingdom
- Languages: Silent; English intertitles

Tons of Money is a 1924 British silent comedy film directed by Frank Hall Crane and starring Leslie Henson, Flora le Breton and Mary Brough. It is an adaptation of the 1922 play Tons of Money by Will Evans and Arthur Valentine. Both were co-produced with Tom Walls. It was remade as a sound film Tons of Money in 1930.

== Cast ==
- Leslie Henson as Aubrey Allington
- Flora le Breton as Louise Allington
- Mary Brough as Mrs. Mullet
- Clifford Seyler as George Maitland
- Jack Denton as Henry
- Elsie Fuller as Jean Everard
- Douglas Munro as Sprules
- Roy Byford as Chesterman
- Willie Warde as Giles
- Ena Mason as Simpson - the maid
