= The True Jacob (1931 film) =

1931 film

- German film poster
- German: Der wahre Jakob
- Directed by: Hans Steinhoff
- Written by: Walter Schlee; Walter Wassermann
- Based on: The True Jacob by Franz Arnold abd Ernst Bach
- Produced by: Anatol Potock; Lothar Stark
- Starring: Ralph Arthur Roberts; Anny Ahlers; Felix Bressart
- Cinematography: Karl Puth
- Music by: Artur Guttmann; Hans J. Salter
- Production company: Lothar Stark-Film
- Distributed by: Messtro-Film
- Release date: 16 March 1931
- Running time: 82 minutes
- Country: Germany
- Language: German

The True Jacob (German: Der wahre Jakob) is a 1931 German comedy film directed by Hans Steinhoff and starring Ralph Arthur Roberts, Anny Ahlers, and Felix Bressart. It is based on a play by Franz Arnold and Ernst Bach which has been adapted into numerous films. It was shot at the Halensee Studios in Berlin. The film's sets were designed by the art director Franz Schroedter.

== Synopsis ==
Peter Struwe, a strictly moralistic city councillor and head of a local purity league travels to a congress in Berlin where he inadvertently becomes entangled in the city's vibrant nightlife. While attempting to avoid a scandal, he meets the dancer Yvette, who mistakenly believes him to be a wealthy "patron" and follows him back to his conservative hometown. The situation escalates into a series of comedic misunderstandings as Struwe desperately tries to hide his "sinful" Berlin escapades from his suspicious wife and colleagues. The chaos is resolved when it is revealed that Yvette is actually the long-lost daughter of Struwe's own wife, leading the councillor to abandon his stuffy façade and embrace a more joyful outlook on life.

== Cast ==
- Ralph Arthur Roberts as Peter Struwe
- Anny Ahlers as Yvette
- Felix Bressart as Böcklein
- Hansi Arnstaedt as Mila
- Paul Henckels as Geheimrat Spülpnagel
- Margot Walter as Lotte
- Viktor de Kowa as James
- Julius Falkenstein as Count Birkstädt
- Vicky Werckmeister as Anna
- Harry Halm as Fred
- Gertrud Wolle as student
- Anna Müller-Lincke as Elise
- Wilhelm Diegelmann as Portier
- Igo Guttmann as Ein Sänger

== See also ==
- Oh, Daddy! (1935)
- One Night Apart (1950)
- The True Jacob (1960)
