= Leslie Henson =

English actor, producer and comedian (1891–1957)

Henson, c. 1920

Leslie Lincoln Henson (3 August 1891 – 2 December 1957) was an English comedian, actor, singer, producer for films and theatre, and film director. He initially worked in silent films and Edwardian musical comedy and became a popular music hall comedian who enjoyed a long stage career. He was famous for his bulging eyes, malleable face and raspy voice and helped to form the Entertainments National Service Association (ENSA) during the Second World War.

Born in Notting Hill, London, Henson became interested in the theatre from an early age, writing and producing theatrical pieces while at school. He studied with the Cairns James School of Musical and Dramatic Art as a child, making his professional stage début at the age of 19. His first West End role was in Nicely, Thanks! (1912) and he later starred in several hit West End Edwardian musical comedies, including To-Night's the Night (1915) and Yes, Uncle! (1917). After briefly serving with the Royal Flying Corps, he was released from active service by the British government to help run a concert party called "The Gaieties", which provided entertainment for the troops during World War I. After the war, he returned to the West End, playing in Kissing Time (1919) and a series of musical comedies and farces throughout the 1920s and 1930s.

At the start of World War II, together with Basil Dean, he helped to form ENSA, with which he entertained British troops abroad. Henson's postwar stage success continued in revues, musicals and plays, including a West End adaptation of The Diary of a Nobody in 1955. Henson's film career was intermittent, and he made 14 films from 1916 to 1956. The most notable of these was Tons of Money in 1924, which introduced the popular Aldwych farces to British cinema audiences. In 1956, Henson's friend Bobby Hullett died in circumstances that struck him as suspicious. Henson anonymously notified the police that her doctor, John Bodkin Adams, should be investigated. Adams was subsequently tried for a different murder but acquitted.

== Life and career ==
Henson was born in Notting Hill, London, the eldest child and only son of Joseph Lincoln Henson, a tallow chandler and his wife, Alice Mary (née Squire). He was educated at the Emanuel School (Wandsworth), and at Cliftonville College (Margate). Interested in the theatre from an early age, Henson wrote and produced theatrical pieces while at school. He worked briefly in the family business but soon studied with the Cairns James School of Musical and Dramatic Art.

=== Early career ===
Henson and Stanley Holloway on stage in Fine and Dandy

Henson began his professional stage career at age 19 in the provinces with The Tatlers' concert party, soon appearing in London in the pantomime Sinbad at the Dalston Theatre at Christmas 1910. After concert appearances, he toured in The Quaker Girl in 1912 in the role of Jeremiah. His first West End role was later that year in Nicely, Thanks! at the Royal Strand Theatre. The actor Stanley Holloway dedicated a chapter in his 1967 autobiography to Henson, describing how Henson helped establish his career by signing him to perform in Nicely Thanks! Henson performed with The Scamps' concerts and starred in the comic roles in hit West End Edwardian musical comedies such as To-Night's the Night (1914 on Broadway and 1915 at the Gaiety Theatre, London), Theodore & Co (1916), and Yes, Uncle! (1917). His malleable features, bulging eyes and raspy voice made him an audience favourite, especially in his own comic sketches. He also appeared in films occasionally, beginning with Wanted: A Widow (1916).

Henson signed up with the Royal Flying Corps but was removed from active service in 1918 to run a concert party group called "The Gaieties" in the 5th Army, to give shows for the troops. That autumn, he was stationed in Lille, which had been recently evacuated by the Germans, and was able to stage revues and a pantomime at the abandoned Opera House.

He returned to the West End in Kissing Time (1919), Sally (1921) and a string of musicals at the Winter Garden Theatre, including A Night Out (1920), The Cabaret Girl (1922) and The Beauty Prize (1923). In Tons of Money (1922), he starred as Aubrey Allington, which led to the long-running series of Aldwych Farces, which he co-produced with Tom Walls. In 1924, he played Aubrey Allington again when he and Walls made his most notable film, Tons of Money, which introduced the Aldwych farces to British cinema audiences for the first time.

He played Toby in Primrose, opening in 1924, and starred in 1925 in Tell Me More, both composed by George Gershwin, and both at the Winter Garden in London. In 1926, he starred in Kid Boots in London and then toured the English provinces in Betty Lee in 1926. In 1927, he appeared in a musical, Lady Luck at the Carlton Theatre, London, followed by Funny Face, 1928. In 1930, Henson and his business partner Firth Shephard co-leased the Novello Theatre and presented a series of farces, It's a Boy! (1930, also starring Henson), It's a Girl! (1930), Follow Through, Nice Goings On! (1933), Lucky Break and Aren't Men Beasts! (1936).

In 1935, he and Shephard took over the Gaiety Theatre, London and produced four successful shows, Seeing Stars (1936), Swing Along (1937), Going Greek (1937) and Running Riot (1938). During the run of the last of these, the aged theatre was condemned and was required to be closed. Henson also returned to film work in the 1930s, appearing in A Warm Corner (1930), The Sport of Kings (1931), It's a Boy (1933), The Girl from Maxim's (1933) and Oh, Daddy! (1935). His later films were The Demi-Paradise (1943) and Home and Away (1956). In 1938, Leslie Henson was appointed president of the Royal Theatrical Fund.

=== Later career ===
At the outbreak of World War II, he returned to the UK from a tour of South Africa and, together with Basil Dean, formed the Entertainments National Service Association (ENSA), a government-sponsored organisation with which he entertained British troops in Europe, the Near East and the Far East. He was in London in 1940, however, for the revue Up and Doing and in 1942 for Fine and Dandy (at which the King and Queen and Princesses Elizabeth and Margaret were surprise guests), both at the Saville Theatre. In 1945, he starred in The Gaieties at the Winter Garden Theatre, and in a revival of 1066 and All That at the Palace Theatre, London. In 1946, he toured the provinces in The Sport of Kings.

In 1948 he starred in the musical farce Bob's Your Uncle. Later performances included non-comedic roles, though with less success, aside from Elwood P. Dowd in Harvey (1950), which he played in the West End and on its subsequent national tour. (Note: After Sid Field died while playing Elwood P. Dowd during a performance of Harvey on 3 February 1950, Henson took over the part for a month, from 11 February, at the Prince of Wales Theatre, London. The play moved to the Piccadilly Theatre on 14 March, where it closed on 1 July 1950. Henson then took it on a tour of 24 venues, opening at the Wimbledon Theatre on 17 July 1950 and closing at the Prince of Wales Theatre, Cardiff, on 20 January 1951.) He portrayed Samuel Pepys in a musical composed by Vivian Ellis, And So to Bed by J. B. Fagan (1951). He starred in Relations Are Best Apart at the Theatre Royal, Bath (1953), as Mr Pooter in a stage adaptation of The Diary of a Nobody at the Duchess Theatre (1955), and as Old Eccles in a musical version of Tom Robertson's Caste (1955). Henson acted up until the time of his death.

=== Family and death ===
Henson was married three times, in each case to an actress:

- Marjorie Kate Farewell "Madge" Saunders, daughter of Edward Henry Master Saunders and Ellen Lucie Margaret White (died 1967), whom he married at St George's Church, Hanover Square, Marylebone, London in 1919
- Gladys Gunn, in 1926
- Harriet "Billie" Dell, in 1944

He had two sons with Harriet – Joe, a farmer (born 1932) and Nicky, an actor (born 1945). Joe founded Cotswold Farm Park; his son, Adam Henson, runs the park and is a TV presenter. Nicky's sons with ex-wife Una Stubbs are composers Christian and Joseph, and another son with wife Marguerite Porter is Keaton, a musician and artist.

Henson died at his home in Harrow Weald, Middlesex, in 1957, aged 66. His body was cremated at Golders Green Crematorium.

== Bobby Hullett's death ==
On 23 July 1956, while in Dublin performing, Henson heard that his close friend Bobby Hullett had died in Eastbourne. Henson was suspicious because Hullett's husband had died just four months earlier and that the doctor John Bodkin Adams had treated both of them. He telephoned the Eastbourne police anonymously to warn them of his fears, instigating an investigation into the death of Hullett. After Adams was acquitted in 1957 of the murder of another patient, Edith Alice Morrell, he was never tried for Hullett's murder. The Home Office pathologist, Francis Camps, noted 163 suspicious deaths among Adams's patients between 1946 and 1956.

== Recordings ==
- Meet Me 'Round the Corner, with Moya Mannering 1912 (streaming audio/HTTP download)
- Sally: original 1921 London cast recordings Monmouth-Evergreen MES-7053 (LP)
- Primrose: original 1924 London cast recordings World Records SH-214 (LP), Pearl 113 (CD)
- Cole Porter in London: original cast recordings from London productions of Nymph Errant, Anything Goes, Wake Up and Dream, Kiss Me Kate, etc. World Records SHB-26 (2xLP)
- Careless Talk. Monologue by Stanley Holloway with Leslie Henson (MP3 download)
- A Few Drinks with Sydney Howard, Columbia (Australia) DOX9

== Filmography ==
- Wanted: A Widow (1916, Short)
- The Real Thing at Last (1916, Short) .... Charlie Chaplin
- The Lifeguardsman (1916) .... Lt Spiff
- Broken Bottles (1920, Short, also writer and director) .... Bottling Barrows
- Alf's Button (1920) .... Alf Higgins
- Tons of Money (1926, also producer) .... Aubrey Allington
- On with the Dance (1927, Short)
- A Warm Corner (1930) .... Mr Corner
- The Sport of Kings (1931) .... Amos Purdie
- It's a Boy (1933) .... James Skippett
- The Girl from Maxim's (1933) .... Dr Petypon
- Oh, Daddy! (1935) .... Lord Pye
- The Demi-Paradise (1943) .... Himself
- Home and Away (1956) .... Uncle Tom
- The Vise (1958, TV Series) .... Police Sergeant (final appearance)

Notes: The source for the television and film appearances is the British Film Institute.

== Bibliography ==
- Henson, Leslie. My Laugh Story. London: Hodder and Staunton, 1926
- Henson, Leslie. Yours Faithfully. London: Long, 1948.
