= Paul Westermeier =

German actor

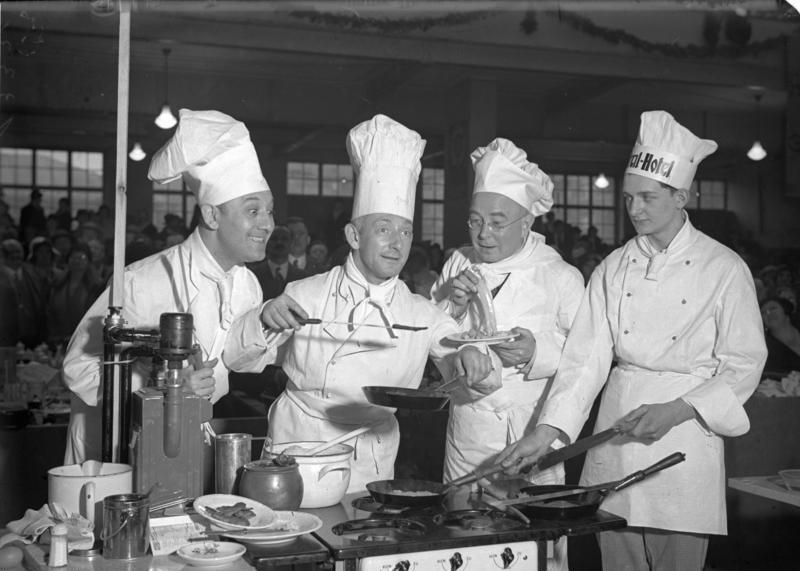
- Left to right, disguised as cooks: Fritz Kampers, Paul Westermeyer and Paul Graetz (1932).
- Born: 9 July 1892; Berlin, German Empire
- Died: 17 October 1972 (aged 80); West Berlin, West Germany
- Other name: Paul Westermeyer
- Occupation: Film actor
- Years active: 1916–1962

Paul Westermeier (9 July 1892 – 17 October 1972) was a German film actor.

== Selected filmography ==
- Wedding in the Eccentric Club (1917)
- Agnes Arnau and Her Three Suitors (1918)
- About the Son (1921)
- Memoirs of a Film Actress (1921)
- Children of Darkness (1921)
- The Big Shot (1922)
- The Enchantress (1924)
- Annemarie and Her Cavalryman (1926)
- The Pride of the Company (1926)
- Circus Romanelli (1926)
- We'll Meet Again in the Heimat (1926)
- A Crazy Night (1927)
- The Long Intermission (1927)
- Always Be True and Faithful (1927)
- Lemke's Widow (1928)
- Dyckerpotts' Heirs (1928)
- Dear Homeland (1929)
- A Thousand Words of German (1930)
- Retreat on the Rhine (1930)
- Josef the Chaste (1930)
- Alraune (1930)
- The Little Escapade (1931)
- Errant Husbands (1931)
- A Crafty Youth (1931)
- The Secret of the Red Cat (1931)
- Everyone Asks for Erika (1931)
- The Beggar Student (1931)
- Weekend in Paradise (1931)
- The Soaring Maiden (1931)
- Berlin-Alexanderplatz (1931)
- The Spanish Fly (1931)
- Louise, Queen of Prussia (1931)
- Quick (1932)
- At Your Orders, Sergeant (1932)
- Things Are Getting Better Already (1932)
- How Shall I Tell My Husband? (1932)
- Honour Among Thieves (1933)
- Inge and the Millions (1933)
- The Castle in the South (1933)
- The Star of Valencia (1933)
- Morgenrot (1933)
- If I Were King (1934)
- What Am I Without You (1934)
- Miss Liselott (1934)
- The Two Seals (1934)
- Love and the First Railway (1934)
- The Sporck Battalion (1934)
- Decoy (1934)
- The Four Musketeers (1934)
- Mother and Child (1934)
- The Valiant Navigator (1935)
- Paul and Pauline (1936)
- The Abduction of the Sabine Women (1936)
- Uncle Bräsig (1936)
- Savoy Hotel 217 (1936)
- The Violet of Potsdamer Platz (1936)
- Fridericus (1937)
- Autobus S (1937)
- The Irresistible Man (1937)
- The Divine Jetta (1937)
- His Best Friend (1937)
- Alarm in Peking (1937)
- Togger (1937)
- The Roundabouts of Handsome Karl (1938)
- Red Orchids (1938)
- Mystery About Beate (1938)
- Secret Mission (1938)
- Nanon (1938)
- The Girl of Last Night (1938)
- The Woman at the Crossroads (1938)
- The Green Emperor (1939)
- Who's Kissing Madeleine? (1939)
- Uproar in Damascus (1939)
- The Journey to Tilsit (1939)
- Twilight (1940)
- Mistress Moon (1941)
- Jakko (1941)
- Andreas Schlüter (1942)
- Diesel (1942)
- The Buchholz Family (1944)
- Marriage of Affection (1944)
- Young Hearts (1944)
- Somewhere in Berlin (1946)
- The Court Concert (1948)
- Torreani (1951)
- Professor Nachtfalter (1951)
- Queen of the Night (1951)
- The White Horse Inn (1952)
- The Flower of Hawaii (1953)
- The Emperor Waltz (1953)
- Money from the Air (1953)
- Hooray, It's a Boy! (1953)
- The Cousin from Nowhere (1953)
- Sauerbruch – Das war mein Leben (1954)
- Columbus Discovers Kraehwinkel (1954)
- Money from the Air (1954)
- The Missing Miniature (1954)
- The Beautiful Miller (1954)
- The Happy Village (1955)
- Father's Day (1955)
- The Congress Dances (1955)
- The Stolen Trousers (1956)
- Der Etappenhase (1957)
- Little Man on Top (1957)
- Lemke's Widow (1957)
- Almenrausch and Edelweiss (1957)
- Mikosch, the Pride of the Company (1958)
- My Sweetheart Is from Tyrol (1958)
- Triplets on Board (1959)
