= The Spanish Fly (1931 film) =

1931 film

- German: Die spanische Fliege
- Directed by: Georg Jacoby
- Based on: The Spanish Fly by Franz Arnold and Ernst Bach
- Produced by: Hermann Fellner; Josef Somlo
- Starring: Oscar Sabo; Betty Bird; Lizzi Waldmüller
- Cinematography: Karl Löb; Willy Winterstein
- Edited by: Paul May
- Production company: Felsom Film
- Distributed by: Felsom Film
- Release date: 9 December 1931
- Running time: 91 minutes
- Country: Germany
- Language: German

The Spanish Fly (German: Die spanische Fliege) is a 1931 German comedy film directed by Georg Jacoby and starring Oscar Sabo, Betty Bird and Lizzi Waldmüller. It was shot at the Tempelhof Studios in Berlin. The film's sets were designed by the art director Hans Jacoby. It premiered at Berlin's Gloria-Palast. It was based on the 1913 play The Spanish Fly by Franz Arnold and Ernst Bach. The film was remade in West Germany in 1955.

== Synopsis ==
The successful mustard manufacturer Ludwig Klinke had a brief fling with an exotic dancer known as "The Spanish Fly" and for twenty years has been secretly sending payments to support their illegitimate child without the knowledge of his strict wife Emma. When a young man Heinrich turns up, Ludwig panics and thinks it is his long-lost son. In fact Heinrich is there to ask him for his daughter Wally's hand in marriage. Ludwig finally gives his blessing, relieved after his frantic attempts to conceal him from his wife. He also discovers that several other industrialists also had affairs with The Spanish Fly and have each been paying her maintenance for a "son" for years.

== Cast ==
- Oscar Sabo as Ludwig Klinke
- Julia Serda as Emma
- Betty Bird as Wally
- Lizzi Waldmüller as Señorita Rosita
- Ralph Arthur Roberts as Wimmer
- Fritz Schulz as Heinrich
- Hans Brausewetter as Doctor Fritz Gerlach
- Lizzi Natzler as Paula
- Paul Westermeier as Burwig
- Hans Hermann Schaufuß as Meisel
- Gertrud Wolle as Mathilde
- Paul Biensfeldt as Onkel Tiedemeier
- Arthur Mainzer as Kreibig
- Henry Bender as Millbitz
- Franz Weber as Christian

== Bibliography ==
- Klaus, Ulrich J. Deutsche Tonfilme: Jahrgang 1931. Klaus-Archiv, 2006.
