= Hooray, It's a Boy! (1931 film) =

1931 film

- German: Hurra – ein Junge!
- Directed by: Georg Jacoby
- Written by: Richard Arvay; Johannes Brandt; Stephan Mihaly; Franz Arnold (play); Ernst Bach (play)
- Produced by: Lola Kreutzberg
- Starring: Lucie Englisch; Max Adalbert; Ida Wüst
- Cinematography: Willy Goldberger
- Music by: Marc Roland
- Production company: Lola Kreutzberg Film
- Release date: 22 October 1931
- Running time: 80 minutes
- Country: Germany
- Language: German

Hooray, It's a Boy! (German: Hurra – ein Junge!) is a 1931 German comedy film directed by Georg Jacoby and starring Lucie Englisch, Max Adalbert and Ida Wüst. It is based on the 1926 play of the same name.

The film's sets were designed by the art directors Emil Hasler and Otto Hunte.

== Cast ==
- Lucie Englisch as Henny Weber
- Max Adalbert as Geheimrat Theodor Natusius
- Ida Wüst as Mathilde Natusius
- Fritz Schulz as Dr. Waldemar Weber
- Jessie Vihrog as Ellen Lüders
- Georg Alexander as Dr. Kurt Brandt
- Ralph Arthur Roberts as Fritz Pappenstiel
- Lotte Lorring
- Vicky Werckmeister as Dienstmädchen Anna
- Hans Hermann Schaufuß as Bürovorsteher Kiebitz

== See also ==
- It's a Boy (1933)
- Hooray, It's a Boy! (1953)
- Ach Egon! (1961)
