= The Spanish Fly (1955 film) =

1955 film directed by Carl Boese

- German: Die spanische Fliege
- Directed by: Carl Boese
- Written by: Edgar Kahn
- Based on: The Spanish Fly by Franz Arnold and Ernst Bach
- Produced by: Heinrich Klemme; Viktor von Struwe
- Starring: Joe Stöckel; Erika von Thellmann; Rudolf Platte
- Cinematography: Willy Winterstein
- Edited by: Johanna Meisel
- Music by: Werner Bochmann
- Production companies: Deutsche Spielfilm; Victor von Struve Filmproduktion
- Distributed by: Panorama-Film
- Release date: 1 March 1955
- Running time: 94 minutes
- Country: West Germany
- Language: German

The Spanish Fly (German: Die spanische Fliege) is a 1955 West German comedy film directed by Carl Boese and starring Joe Stöckel, Erika von Thellmann and Rudolf Platte. It was shot at the Göttingen Studios with sets designed by the art director Ernst Klose. It was based on the 1913 play The Spanish Fly by Franz Arnold and Ernst Bach. A previous adaptation had been released in 1931.

== Cast ==
In alphabetical order

- Helmut Ahner as Otto
- Elisabeth Flickenschildt as Helene
- Albert Florath as Coldewey
- Kurt Großkurth as Hartmann
- Paul Henckels as Dr. Ambrosius
- Ursula Herking as Frau Hartmann
- Holger Hildmann as Fritz
- Stanislav Ledinek as Pollack
- Hans Leibelt as Breilmann
- Elena Luber as Sekretärin
- Jester Naefe as Hannelore Klinke
- Rudolf Platte as Hugo Sommer
- Lotte Rausch as Frau Semmelmann
- Hans Richter as Dr. Gerlach
- Gretl Schörg as Miss Hilton
- Ruth Stephan as Jutta
- Hans Stiebner as Oexle
- Joe Stöckel as Heinrich Klinke
- Hubert von Meyerinck
- Erika von Thellmann as Käthe

== Bibliography ==
- Goble, Alan. The Complete Index to Literary Sources in Film. Walter de Gruyter, 1999.
