= The Whole Town's Talking (1926 film) =

1926 film by Edward Laemmle

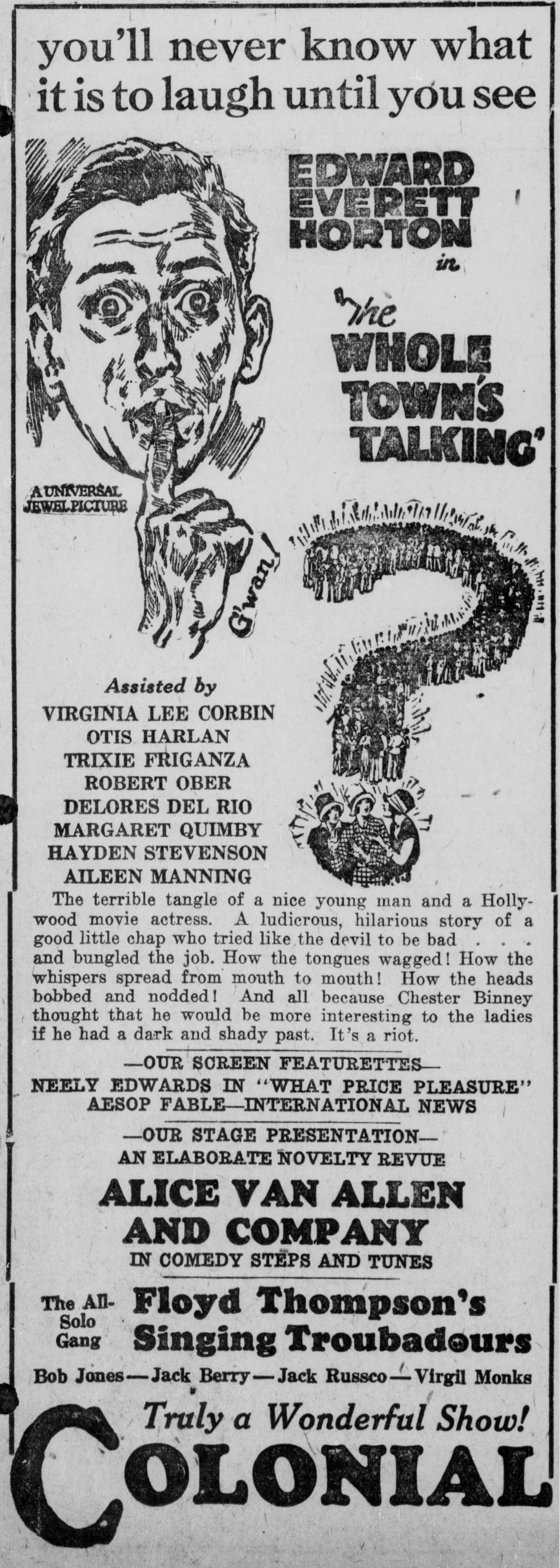
- Contemporary advertisement
- Directed by: Edward Laemmle
- Screenplay by: Raymond Cannon
- Based on: The Whole Town's Talking; 1923 play by Anita Loos; John Emerson
- Produced by: Carl Laemmle
- Starring: Edward Everett Horton; Virginia Lee Corbin; Trixie Friganza
- Cinematography: Charles J. Stumar
- Distributed by: Universal Pictures
- Release date: December 26, 1926
- Running time: 6,662 feet
- Country: United States
- Language: Silent (English intertitles)

The Whole Town's Talking is a 1926 American silent romantic comedy film directed by Edward Laemmle and starring Edward Everett Horton, Virginia Lee Corbin, and Trixie Friganza. It is based on a play by Anita Loos and John Emerson, which in turn is based on a play by Franz Arnold and Ernst Bach.

== Plot ==
As described in a film magazine, war veteran Chester Binney incorrectly believes he is carrying a silver plate in his skull and must avoid all excitement and exertion, returns to his home town where he is feted by his old employer George Simmons, a big butter and egg magnate who hopes to strike up a match between his daughter Ethel and the ex-doughboy, as the latter is heir to a tidy fortune. Chester, however, proves a flop at sex and the haughty girl drops him cold. Simmons decides upon a plan that will add some color to the drab past of the rejected suitor. On the back of a photograph of Rita Renault, a movie star, he pens a love message to Chester and signs Rita's name. Ethel finds out that Chester has been a devil with the women in the past she begins to play for him. Chester confesses that it was all a hoax and that he has never set eyes on Rita, but she becomes the more attracted to him when she believes him to be an accomplished liar.

Rita arrives in town for a personal appearance, accompanied by her jealous husband Jack Shields, a prize fighter. Simmons, who has lied to his wife as to his whereabouts on the previous night, sees the name Jack Shields on the hotel register and tells her that he is the man with whom he has been transacting business. Mrs. Simmons checks this by calling the hotel. Shields is out, but she is satisfied that he is no myth, and all is peace until Shields enters the hotel lobby and gets the cryptic phone message from the Simmons family. Curiosity takes him to the Simmons mansion, where he is introduced by Donald Mont Allen, a dapper suitor of Ethel's who yearns for the overthrow of Chester. He shows Shields the photograph of Rita. Shields becomes angry and cross-questions Chester.

Rita, learning of her husband's errand, decides to teach him a lesson. She calls at the Simmons house and embraces Chester, covering him with kisses. A running fight follows between Shields and Chester, the latter trying to hide for fear the excitement will kill him. Mrs. Simmons calls a cop, who bangs at a locked door behind which Shields, Chester, and Mont Allen are engaged in a scuffle in the dark. Chester is hiding under the table while Shields and Mont Allen, each believing the other to be the hated Chester, batter themselves to a finish. When the door is broken down, Chester recognizes the cop as an army buddy, who explains to him that he (the cop) is the one who is wearing the silver plate. Hearing this, Chester takes a new lease on life, knocking down his two enemies when they get up from the floor. The two men slink off while he roughly holds the haughty Ethel, who gladly submits to his cave man embraces.

== Cast ==
- Edward Everett Horton as Chester Binney
- Virginia Lee Corbin as Ethel Simmons
- Trixie Friganza as Mrs. George Simmons
- Otis Harlan as George Simmonns
- Robert Ober as Donald Montallen
- Aileen Manning as Mrs. Van Loon
- Hayden Stevenson as Tom O'Brien
- Margaret Quimby as Sadie Wise
- Dolores del Río as Rita Renault, a Movie Star
- Malcolm Waite as Jack Shields

== Preservation status ==
A complete print of The Whole Town's Talking is held in the UCLA Film & Television Archive.
