= Walter Kollo =

German composer and conductor (1878–1940)

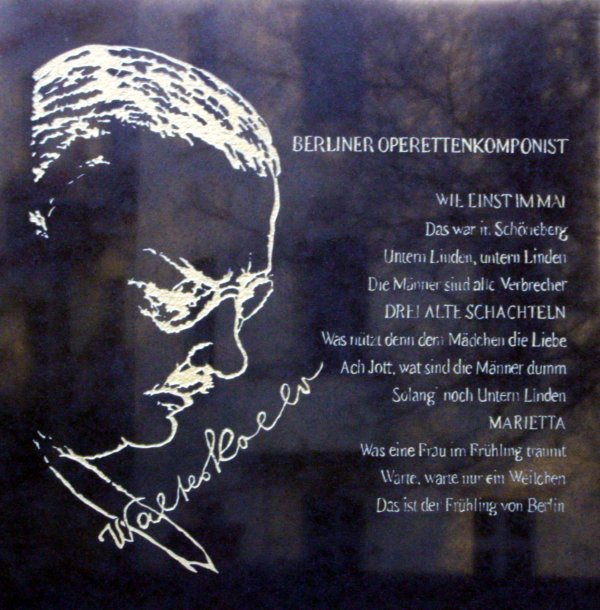
Memorial plaque for Walter Kollo at his grave in the Friedhof II der Sophiengemeinde Berlin in Berlin

Walter Kollo (28 January 1878 – 30 September 1940) was a German composer of operettas, Possen mit Gesang, and Singspiele as well as popular songs. He was also a conductor and a music publisher.

== Life and career ==
Kollo was born in Neidenburg, East Prussia on 28 January 1878. His best known work, the operetta Wie einst im Mai (1913), was the basis of a 1917 Sigmund Romberg operetta in America entitled Maytime.

A merchant's son, he was expected to take his father's trade but devoted himself to the study of music in the Königsberg Sondershausen music conservatory with his mother's help. He became a theater conductor for a brief time in Königsberg before going to Berlin in 1899. In Berlin, he turned towards popular and light music, and from 1908 wrote music for the popular musical theater. In 1910, with Willy Bredschneider he composed his first great success, Große Rosinen, produced on New Year's Eve 1911. Somewhat prolifically, he continued composing musical comedies, farces and operettas, with including Wie einst im Mai (1913; with the songs Es war in Schöneberg im Monat Mai and Die Männer sind alle Verbrecher), Der Juxbaron (1916), Drei alte Schachteln (1917) and Die Frau ohne Kuß (1924).

Kollo emerged as a composer of revues and sound films in 1915, was one of the founders of the performer's rights organization GEMA, and had his own music publishing company. Later, he made successful concert tours as a conductor of his own works.

With Jean Gilbert and Paul Lincke, Kollo was a founder of the Berliner Operette.

His son Willi Kollo was also a composer of light music and his grandson is the Wagnerian tenor René Kollo.

Walter Kollo died in Berlin on 30 September 1940.

== List of operettas ==
Walzer aus der Operette Drei alte Schachtel
Recorded in 1917, performed by Dacapo-Lyrophon-Orchester (2:41)

Potpourri aus der Operette Die tolle Komtess
Recorded in 1917, performed by Dacapo-Lyrophon-Orchester (2:54)

- 1911 – Sein Herzensjunge (1 April 1911, Thalia-Theater, Wuppertal-Elberfeld)
- 1911 – Große Rosinen (31 December 1911, Berliner Theater, Berlin)
- 1912 – Filmzauber (19 October 1912, Berliner Theater, Berlin)
- 1912 – So wird’s gemacht (December 1912, Neues Theater, Hamburg)
- 1913 – Wie einst im Mai (first version, 4 October 1913, Berliner Theater, Berlin)
- 1913 – Der Juxbaron (14 November 1913, Carl Schultze-Theater, Hamburg)
- 1914 – Immer feste druff (1 October 1914, Theater am Nollendorfplatz, Berlin)
- 1915 – Wenn zwei Hochzeit machen (23 October 1915, Berliner Theater, Berlin)
- 1916 – Der selige Balduin (31 March 1916, Montis Operetten-Theater, Berlin)
- 1916 – Auf Flügeln des Gesanges (9 September 1916, Berliner Theater, Berlin)
- 1917 – Drei alte Schachteln (6 October 1917, Theater am Nollendorfplatz, Berlin)
- 1917 – Die tolle Komteß (21 February 1917, Berliner Theater, Berlin)
- 1918 – Blitzblaues Blut (9 February 1918, Berliner Theater, Berlin)
- 1918 – Sterne, die wieder leuchten (6 September 1918, Berliner Theater, Berlin)
- 1919 – Fräulein Puck (25 June 1919, Münchner Volkstheater, München)
- 1920 – Der verjüngte Adolar (4 October 1920, Theater in der Kommandantenstraße, Berlin)
- 1921 – Die Königin der Nacht (2 September 1921, Neues Operettentheater, Berlin)
- 1922 – Lady Chic (11 March 1922, Neues Operettentheater, Berlin)
- 1923 – Marietta (22 December 1923, Metropol-Theater, Berlin)
- 1924 – Die tanzende Prinzessin (15 April 1924, Komische Oper, Berlin)
- 1924 – Die vertagte (Hochzeits) Nacht (11 November 1924, Stadttheater, Mainz)
- 1924 – Die vertauschte Frau (Neues Operettenhaus, Berlin)
- 1924 – Die Frau ohne Kuß (5 July 1924, Schillertheater, Berlin)
- 1925 – Olly-Polly (3 September 1925, Neues Theater am Zoo, Berlin)
- 1926 – Nur Du (23 December 1926, Berliner Theater, Berlin)
- 1927 – Drei arme kleine Mädels (22 April 1927, Theater am Nollendorfplatz, Berlin)
- 1928 – Jettchen Gebert (22 December 1928, Theater am Nollendorfplatz, Berlin)
- 1930 – Der doppelte Bräutigam (7 March 1930, Theater am Schiffbauerdamm, Berlin)
- 1930 – Majestät läßt bitten (5 April 1930, Komische Oper, Berlin)
- 1931 – Frauen haben das gern (4 June 1931, Komische Oper, Berlin)
- 1933 – Die Männer sind mal so (4 January 1933, Schillertheater, Berlin)
- 1933 – Lieber reich aber glücklich (Komödienhaus, Berlin)
- 1934 – Derfflinger (17 February 1935, Metropol-Theater, Berlin)
- 1935 – Heirat nicht ausgeschlossen (4 January 1935, Komische Oper, Berlin)
- 1935 – Ein Kaiser ist verliebt (22 August 1935, Deutsches Nationaltheater, Osnabrück)
- 1935 – Berlin, wie es weint, Berlin, wie es lacht (10 October 1935, Plaza, Berlin)
- 1935 – Pour plaire aux femmes (nach "Frauen haben das gern") (17 October 1935, Théatre Déjazet, Paris)
- 1936 – Mädel ahoi (17 April 1936, Deutsches Nationaltheater, Osnabrück)
- 1938 – Das Schiff der schönen Frauen (25 December 1938, Apollo-Theater, Köln)
- 1943 – Wie einst im Mai (Walter und Willi Kollo) (26 May 1943, Theater des Volkes Berlin)

== Recordings ==
Kollo's grandson René Kollo has recorded a CD of songs and arias by Walter Kollo entitled Auf den Spuren meiner Väter: René Kollo sings Kollo, 2009, CD EMI).
