= Austin Melford =

British screenwriter and film director (1884–1971)

Austin Melford (24 August 1884 — 8 August 1971) was a British screenwriter and film director. He was born in Alverstoke, Hampshire and was the older brother of actor Jack Melford.

He was married to Jessie Winter.

== Partial filmography ==
=== Director ===
- Car of Dreams (1935)
- Oh, Daddy! (1935)
- Radio Lover (1936)

=== Screenwriter ===
- It's a Boy (1933)
- Night of the Garter (1933)
- A Southern Maid (1933)
- Aunt Sally (1933)
- Road House (1934)
- Heat Wave (1935)
- Three Maxims (1936)
- It's Love Again (1936)
- Jack of All Trades (1936)
- Feather Your Nest (1937)
- Keep Fit (1937)
- School for Husbands (1937)
- The Girl in the Taxi (1937)
- The Show Goes On (1937)
- The Mill on the Floss (1937)
- I See Ice (1938)
- Many Tanks Mr. Atkins (1938)
- The Good Old Days (1939) (lost)
- Murder Will Out (1939) (lost)
- His Brother's Keeper (1940)
- He Found a Star (1941)
- We'll Smile Again (1942)
- South American George (1943)
- Theatre Royal (1943)
- Champagne Charlie (1944)
- Don Chicago (1945)
