= The Dangerous Game (1933 film) =

1933 film

- Directed by: Weyler Hildebrand
- Written by: Franz Arnold (play Unter Geschäftsaufsicht); Ernst Bach (play Unter Geschäftsaufsicht); Edvard Persson
- Starring: Edvard Persson; Doris Nelson; Eivor Kjellström
- Cinematography: Ernst Westerberg
- Music by: Sten Axelsson
- Production company: Europa Film
- Release date: 18 April 1933
- Country: Sweden
- Language: Swedish

The Dangerous Game (Swedish: Den farliga leken) is a 1933 Swedish comedy film directed by Weyler Hildebrand and starring Edvard Persson, Doris Nelson and Eivor Kjellström.

This was Marianne Löfgren's debut film. The film's art direction was by Bibi Lindström.

== Cast ==
- Edvard Persson as Vredberg
- Doris Nelson as Mrs. Vredberg
- Eivor Kjellström as Rut Vredberg
- Åke Ohberg as Bruce
- Anders Frithiof as Smith
- Marianne Löfgren as Margit Smith
- Gustaf Wally as Mr. Wallenberg
- Harry Ahlin as Wigert
- Åke Söderblom as Klang
- Margit Rosengren as Lola Brio

== Bibliography ==
- Qvist, Per Olov & von Bagh, Peter. Guide to the Cinema of Sweden and Finland. Greenwood Publishing Group, 2000.
