= The Princess's Whim =

1934 film

- Directed by: Henri-Georges Clouzot; Karl Hartl
- Written by: Henri-Georges Clouzot; Karl Hartl; Irma von Cube; Louis Verneuil
- Based on: My Sister and I by Georges Berr and Louis Verneuil
- Produced by: Arnold Pressburger; Gregor Rabinovitch
- Starring: Marie Bell; Albert Préjean; Armand Bernard
- Cinematography: Franz Planer
- Edited by: René Métain
- Music by: Ralph Benatzky; Willy Schmidt-Gentner
- Production company: Cine-Allianz Tonfilmproduktions
- Distributed by: L'Alliance Cinématographique Européenne
- Release date: 16 January 1934
- Running time: 85 minutes
- Countries: France; Germany
- Language: French

The Princess's Whim (French: Caprice de princesse) is a 1934 French-German comedy film directed by Henri-Georges Clouzot and Karl Hartl and starring Marie Bell, Albert Préjean and Armand Bernard. It was produced as the French-language version of the 1933 German film Her Highness the Saleswoman and distributed by L'Alliance Cinématographique Européenne, the French subsidiary of UFA. It is based on the play My Sister and I by Georges Berr and Louis Verneuil. It was shot at the Babelsberg Studios in Berlin.The film's sets were designed by the art director Werner Schlichting.

== Synopsis ==
Princess Isabelle falls in love with André, a literary historian in charge of her family's library, but he is not interested due to her grandiose manner. He seeks a woman from a more simple background. Isabelle then passes herself off as a financially struggling younger sister Irène, who worked as a salesgirl, in order to win him over.

== Cast ==
- Marie Bell as Irène / Isabelle
- Albert Préjean as André Martine / André Méry
- Armand Bernard as Barnabé
- Roger Dann as Octave
- Guy Sloux as Paul
- Germaine Roger as Henriette
- Gaston Jacquet as Le Notaire
- Fernand Frey as Felix - Le Valet
- Sinoël as Un matelot
- Bill Bocket as Le Contrôleur
- Gaston Mauger as Le Capitaine
- Marcel Merminod as Un Matelot

== Bibliography ==
- Alpi, Deborah Lazaroff. Robert Siodmak: A Biography, with Critical Analyses of His Films Noirs and a Filmography of All His Works. McFarland, 1998.
- Bock, Hans-Michael & Bergfelder, Tim. The Concise CineGraph. Encyclopedia of German Cinema. Berghahn Books, 2009.
- Goble, Alan. The Complete Index to Literary Sources in Film. Walter de Gruyter, 1999.
- Lloyd, Christopher. Henri-Georges Clouzot. Manchester University Press, 2007.
