= The English Marriage =

1934 film

- Directed by: Reinhold Schünzel
- Written by: Ludwig von Wohl
- Based on: The English Marriage by Ludwig von Wohl
- Produced by: Fritz Klotsch; Arnold Pressburger; Gregor Rabinovitch
- Starring: Renate Müller; Anton Walbrook; Adele Sandrock
- Cinematography: Friedl Behn-Grund
- Edited by: Rudolf Schaad
- Music by: Franz Doelle
- Production company: Cine-Allianz
- Release date: 31 October 1934
- Running time: 97 minutes
- Country: Germany
- Language: German

The English Marriage (German: Die Englische Heirat) is a 1934 German comedy film directed by Reinhold Schünzel and starring Renate Müller, Anton Walbrook and Adele Sandrock. It was based on a novel of the same title by Ludwig von Wohl who also wrote the screenplay. The film's sets were designed by the art director Otto Hunte. Location shooting took place at Berlin's Tempelhof Airport and on Heligoland. It was made by Cine-Allianz and a number of those involved including its director, producers, screenwriter and star Anton Walbrook soon after left Nazi Germany due to their Jewish backgrounds.

== Synopsis ==
A young German woman is engaged to marry a British aristocrat but has to win over his hostile family.

== Cast ==
- Renate Müller as Gerte Winter
- Anton Walbrook as Warwick Brent
- Adele Sandrock as Lady Mavis
- Georg Alexander as Douglas Mavis, ihr Enkel
- Fritz Odemar as Percival, ihr Sohn
- Hans Richter as Tuck Mavis, ihr jüngster Enkel
- Hilde Hildebrand as Bella Amery
- Etta Klingenberg as Roberta Buckley
- Gertrud Wolle as Lady Buckley
- Julius E. Herrmann as Sir Robert Buckley
- Hugo Werner-Kahle as Digby
- Gertrud de Lalsky as Gertes Mutter
- Anton Pointner
- Ewald Wenck
- Olga Engl
- Meta Jäger
- Else Reval

== Bibliography ==
- Hake, Sabine. Popular cinema of the Third Reich. University of Texas Press, 2001.
- Strobl, Gerwin. The Germanic Isle: Nazi Perceptions of Britain. Cambridge University Press, 2000.
