= My Song for You (film) =

- Directed by: Maurice Elvey
- Written by: Austin Melford; Robert Edmunds; Richard Benson
- Based on: Ein Lied für Dich by Ernst Marischka and Irma von Cube
- Produced by: Michael Balcon; Arnold Pressburger
- Starring: Jan Kiepura; Sonnie Hale; Emlyn Williams
- Cinematography: Charles Van Enger
- Edited by: Charles Frend
- Music by: Mischa Spoliansky
- Production companies: Ciné-Alliance; Gaumont British
- Distributed by: Gaumont British Distributors
- Release date: 30 July 1934 (London)
- Running time: 85 minutes
- Country: United Kingdom
- Language: English

My Song for You is a 1934 British musical comedy film directed by Maurice Elvey and starring Jan Kiepura, Sonnie Hale, Emlyn Williams and Aileen Marson. It was shot at the Lime Grove Studios in London. The film's sets were designed by the art director Alfred Junge. Kiepura sang the title song "My Song for You" written by Mischa Spoliansky and Frank Eyton. The song was released on an EP "Tell Me Tonight" (also a song by Spoliansky and Eyton) in 1957.

== Plot ==
Arriving in Venice for a production of "Aida", young tenor Ricardo Gatti meets the attractive Mary, who has sneaked into the opera house in an attempt to get her fiancé hired as a pianist. Ricardo invites Mary to tea and she tells her story, describing her fiancé as her "brother". Captivated by her, the tenor uses his influence to obtain the job with the orchestra. However, filled with guilt at her deception, Mary breaks off her engagement and consents instead to marry her parents' choice, a wealthy society man. But just before the wedding, she changes her mind and marries Ricardo instead.

== Cast ==
- Jan Kiepura as Ricardo Gatti
- Sonnie Hale as Charlie
- Emlyn Williams as Theodore Bruckner
- Aileen Marson as Mary Newberg
- Gina Malo as Fifi
- Muriel George as Mrs Newberg
- George Merritt as Mr Newberg
- Reginald Smith as Baron Johann Felix Kleeberg
- C. Denier Warren as Head Waiter at Monbijou
- Vi Kaley as Charlady at Imperial Café
- Andreas Malandrinos as Head Waiter at Imperial Café
- D.J. Williams as Opera House Secretary

== Critical reception ==
The New York Times wrote, "the film is at its best, of course, while its star is attuning his magnificent tenor to a variety of classic arias. The musical high spots of the show are the "Ave Maria" of Gounod, which M. Kiepura sings impressively during a church wedding, and the "Celeste Aïda," which he rehearses during an amusing backstage sequence at the opera house while "Aïda" is being trundled through its paces"; and TV Guide called the film "charming in parts, this is a nicely done musical with some good detailed direction."

== See also ==
- A Song for You (Ein Lied für Dich, German-language film, 1933)
- All for Love (Tout pour l'amour, French-language film, 1933)

== Bibliography ==
- Wood, Linda. British Films, 1927–1939. British Film Institute, 1986.
