= City of Song =

1931 film by Carmine Gallone

- Trade advertisement
- Directed by: Carmine Gallone
- Written by: C.H. Dand; Miles Malleson; Hans Székely
- Produced by: Arnold Pressburger; Isidore Schlesinger; Bernard Vorhaus
- Starring: Jan Kiepura; Betty Stockfeld; Heather Angel
- Cinematography: Curt Courant; Arpad Viragh
- Edited by: Lars Moen
- Music by: Paul Abraham; Philip Braham; Ernesto Tagliaferri
- Production companies: Cine-Allianz Tonfilm; Tobis Film
- Distributed by: Sterling Films
- Release date: 9 January 1931
- Running time: 96 minutes
- Countries: Germany; United Kingdom
- Language: English

City of Song (also known as Farewell to Love) is a 1931 British/German romance film directed by Carmine Gallone and starring Jan Kiepura, Betty Stockfeld and Hugh Wakefield. It was written by C.H. Dand, Miles Malleson and Hans Székely, and was shot at Wembley Studios with sets designed by the art directors Oscar Friedrich Werndorff and J. Elder Wills. A German-language version was released in 1930 under the title The Singing City.

== Plot ==
A tourist guide in Naples is taken on by an English woman impressed by his singing, and who regards him as her protégé.

== Cast ==
- Jan Kiepura as Giovanni Cavallone
- Betty Stockfeld as Claire Winter
- Hugh Wakefield as Hon. Roddy Fielding
- Heather Angel as Carmela
- Franz Maldacea as Chi, a boy of the streets
- Philip Easton as John, an artist
- Miles Malleson as theater watchman

== Reception ==
Film Weekly wrote: "Any British film which has captured natural beauty so splendidly as City of Song, and blended it so smoothly with impressive music, deserves your keen interest; and it is recommended to you, if only for this. ... It has been said that City of Song is a 'critic's picture,' but it is felt that the filmgoer of intelligence will make it a 'public's picture.' "

Kine Weekly wrote: "Here, at last, is the perfect sound film, and a British one at that. Thanks to the imaginative treatment of the producer, Carmine Gallone, melody, song, drama and scenic beauty are blended into a veritable masterpiece which is irresistible in its universal appeal. The continuity is so brilliant that the story literally flows along carrying one with it sublimely unconscious of the passing of time. Jan Kiepura is indeed a discovery and his singing is magnificent, while the English players, Betty Stockfield and Hugh Vo wakefield, acquit themselves with distinction."

Variety wrote: "Film is much to long and Carmine Gallone, whose direction always has an eye to the pictorial rather than the dramatic, doesn't seem to have realized how dialog can be used to shorten and bridge a picture. He shows things happening and then lets you hear others describe how they happen. ... Film carries a weight of exteriors around the Naples district, most of which are very pretty but reduce interest to the scenic level. Art direction is very advanced for a British picture."
