= One Night's Song =

1933 film

- Directed by: Pierre Colombier; Anatole Litvak
- Written by: Henri-Georges Clouzot; Albrecht Joseph; Irma von Cube
- Produced by: Arnold Pressburger; Gregor Rabinovitch; William A. Szekeley
- Starring: Jan Kiepura; Magda Schneider; Pierre Brasseur
- Cinematography: Robert Baberske; Willy Goldberger; Fritz Arno Wagner
- Edited by: Francis Salabert
- Music by: Willy Schmidt-Gentner; Mischa Spoliansky
- Production company: Cine-Allianz
- Distributed by: Les Films Osso
- Release date: 3 February 1933
- Running time: 85 minutes
- Countries: France; Germany
- Language: French

One Night's Song (French: La chanson d'une nuit) is a 1933 musical film directed by Pierre Colombier and Anatole Litvak and starring Jan Kiepura, Magda Schneider and Pierre Brasseur. It was a co-production between Germany and France. It was shot at the Babelsberg Studios in Berlin alongside the German The Song of Night. A separate English-language version, Tell Me Tonight, was also produced.

== Synopsis ==
Celebrated opera singer Enrico Ferraro is overwhelmed by his fame and tired of every aspect of his daily life being controlled by his manager. He heads to the French Riviera for a break and there encounters Koretzky, a man who strongly resembles him. He engages Koretzky to act as his double but complications soon arise.

== Cast ==
- Jan Kiepura as Enrico Ferraro
- Magda Schneider as Mathilde
- Pierre Brasseur as Koretzky
- Charlotte Lysès as Mme Pategg
- Clara Tambour as Le manager
- Charles Lamy as Balthazar
- Lucien Baroux as Pategg
- René Bergeron as L'employé des contributions
- Pierre Labry as L'inspecteur

== Critical reception ==
A review in the film magazine Pour Vous considered it "tasteful cinema, light-heartedness and good humor without any vulgarity" while other reviewers praised Anatole Litvak's direction.

== Bibliography ==
- Bessy, Maurice & Chirat, Raymond. Histoire du cinéma français: 1929-1934. Pygmalion, 1988.
- Crisp, Colin. Genre, Myth and Convention in the French Cinema, 1929-1939. Indiana University Press, 2002.
- Rège, Philippe. Encyclopedia of French Film Directors, Volume 1. Scarecrow Press, 2009.
