= The Song of Night =

1932 film

- Directed by: Anatole Litvak
- Written by: Albrecht Joseph; Irma von Cube
- Produced by: Arnold Pressburger; Gregor Rabinovitch
- Starring: Jan Kiepura; Magda Schneider; Fritz Schulz
- Cinematography: Robert Baberske; Fritz Arno Wagner
- Music by: Willy Schmidt-Gentner; Mischa Spoliansky
- Production company: Cine-Allianz Tonfilm
- Distributed by: UFA
- Release date: 27 May 1932
- Running time: 85 minutes
- Country: Germany
- Language: German

The Song of Night (German: Das Lied einer Nacht) is a 1932 German musical comedy film directed by Anatole Litvak and starring Jan Kiepura, Magda Schneider and Fritz Schulz. It was made at the Babelsberg Studios in Berlin and on location in Lugano and Locarno. The film's sets were designed by Werner Schlichting. A separate English-language version Tell Me Tonight was made, also directed by Litvak. A French version One Night's Song was released in 1933.

== Cast ==
- Jan Kiepura as Enrico Ferraro
- Magda Schneider as Mathilde
- Fritz Schulz as Koretzky
- Otto Wallburg as Pategg
- Ida Wüst as Mrs. Pategg
- Margo Lion as Manager of Ferraro
- Julius Falkenstein as Balthasar

== Plot ==
Enrico Ferraro is a famous opera singer who finds his life burdensome. His manager shuttles him from one concert to the next, even though Ferraro longs for free time. Seeking to escape the stress, he travels south. Along the way, he meets Koretzky, a man who bears a striking resemblance to him. Seeing an opportunity, Ferraro decides to use him as a stand-in for rehearsals. However, Koretzky makes his living as a marriage swindler: he marries wealthy young women only to abandon them the very next day. He persuades Ferraro to help him woo Mathilde, an attractive opera singer. Ferraro agrees and—much like Cyrano de Bergerac—lends his voice to serenade Mathilde. Yet she discovers the ruse and alerts the police. Ferraro ends up in jail but secures his release by proving his innocence through the sheer power of his voice, ultimately sending Koretzky behind bars in his stead. In the end, Ferraro and Mathilde get married.

== Bibliography ==
- Murphy, Robert. Directors in British and Irish Cinema: A Reference Companion. British Film Institute, 2006.
