= My Heart Calls You =

1934 film directed by Carmine Gallone

- German: Mein Herz ruft nach dir
- Directed by: Carmine Gallone
- Written by: Ernst Marischka; Emeric Pressburger
- Produced by: Arnold Pressburger; Gregor Rabinovitch
- Starring: Jan Kiepura; Mártha Eggerth; Paul Kemp
- Cinematography: Friedl Behn-Grund
- Edited by: Eduard von Borsody
- Music by: Robert Stolz
- Production company: Cine-Allianz Tonfilm
- Distributed by: UFA
- Release date: 23 March 1934
- Running time: 83 minutes
- Country: Germany
- Language: German

My Heart Calls You (German: Mein Herz ruft nach dir) is a 1934 German musical film directed by Carmine Gallone and starring Jan Kiepura, Mártha Eggerth and Paul Kemp. Separate English-language (My Heart Is Calling) and French-language versions (Mon cœur t'appelle) were made, both also directed by Gallone.

The film's sets were designed by the art directors Kurt Herlth and Werner Schlichting.

== Cast ==
- Jan Kiepura as Mario Delmonti
- Mártha Eggerth as Carla Schmidt
- Paul Kemp as Director Rosé
- Paul Hörbiger as Director Arvelle
- Theo Lingen as Coq, sein Sekretär
- Hilde von Stolz as Vera Valetti
- Trude Hesterberg as Director of a beauty salon
- Hilde Hildebrand as Margot
- Franz Soot as Der Tenor
- Sigrid Eschborn as soprano
- Anton Imkamp as Linsemann
- Hans Leibelt
- Willi Schur as
- Kurt Mühlhardt as Wolfram Peters
- Gerhard Bienert
- Louis Ralph
- Franz Sauer
- Karl Platen
- Paul Vincenti
- Georg Frigge
- Max Vierlinger
- Hans von Bachmayr
- Hedwig von Debitzka

== Bibliography ==
- Von Dassanowsky, Robert. Screening Transcendence: Film Under Austrofascism and the Hollywood Hope, 1933-1938. Indiana University Press, 2018
