= My Heart Is Calling You =

1934 French film

- Directed by: Carmine Gallone; Serge Véber
- Written by: Ernst Marischka; Emeric Pressburger (uncredited)
- Produced by: Arnold Pressburger; Fritz Klotsch (line producer)
- Starring: Jan Kiepura; Danielle Darrieux; Lucien Baroux
- Cinematography: Friedl Behn-Grund
- Edited by: Eduard von Borsody
- Music by: Robert Stolz
- Production companies: Cine-Allianz Tonfilm; Gaumont-Franco Film-Aubert
- Release date: 14 September 1934 (Paris)
- Running time: 84 minutes
- Countries: France; Germany
- Language: French

My Heart Is Calling You (French: Mon coeur t'appelle) is the 1934 French version of a German musical film directed by Carmine Gallone and Serge Véber, written by Ernst Marischka, produced by Arnold Pressburger. The film stars Jan Kiepura, Danielle Darrieux and Lucien Baroux. The music score is by Robert Stolz.

Its English (My Heart Is Calling) and German language (My Heart Calls You) versions were filmed simultaneously with different cast members, Marta Eggerth playing Danielle Darrieux's role. The film's sets were designed by the art directors Kurt Herlth and Werner Schlichting.

It tells the story of a female tenor singer who ends up triumphing to the opera of Paris.

== Cast ==
- Jan Kiepura as Mario Delmonti
- Danielle Darrieux as Nicole Nadin
- Lucien Baroux as Rosé - le directeur
- Julien Carette as Coq
- Charles Dechamps as Arvelle - le directeur de l'Opéra
- Bill Bocket]
- Jeanne Cheirel as La directrice du salon de modes
- Colette Darfeuil as Margot
- Rolla France as Vera Valetti
- André Gabriello as Favrolles
- Edouard Hamel
- Hermant
- Nono Lecorre as Casserole
- Pierre Piérade
- Paul Kemp as Homme dans le casino

== Bibliography ==
- Bock, Hans-Michael & Bergfelder, Tim. The Concise CineGraph. Encyclopedia of German Cinema. Berghahn Books, 2009.
