= My Cousin from Warsaw (film) =

1931 film directed by Carmine Gallone

- Directed by: Carmine Gallone
- Written by: Louis Verneuil (play)
- Screenplay by: Franz Schulz; Karl Noti; Henri-Georges Clouzot
- Produced by: Arnold Pressburger
- Starring: Elvire Popesco; André Roanne; Madeleine Lambert
- Cinematography: Curt Courant
- Edited by: Roost
- Music by: Artur Guttmann
- Production company: Cine-Allianz Tonfilm
- Distributed by: Les Films Osso
- Release date: 10 April 1931 (Paris)
- Running time: 95 minutes
- Countries: France; Germany
- Language: French

My Cousin from Warsaw (French: Ma cousine de Varsovie) is a 1931 French-German comedy film directed by Carmine Gallone and starring Elvire Popesco, André Roanne and Madeleine Lambert. The film's screenplay was adapted by Henri-Georges Clouzot. A separate German-language version was also made.

The film's art direction was by Julius von Borsody.

== Cast ==
- Elvire Popesco as Sonia Varilovna
- André Roanne as Hubert
- Madeleine Lambert as Lucienne
- Gustave Gallet as Archibald Burel
- Pierre Noyelle as Toby
- Sylvette Fillacier as Rosalie
- Carlos Avril as Joseph
- Jean-Marie de l'Isle as The doctor Ma cousine de Varsovie
- Saturnin Fabre as Saint-Hilaire

== Release ==
The film was screened in Paris on 10 April 1931.

== Bibliography ==
- Goble, Alan (1999). The Complete Index to Literary Sources in Film. Walter de Gruyter. ISBN 978-3-11-095194-3.
