= My Cousin from Warsaw =

1931 film directed by Carl Boese

- German film poster
- German: Meine Cousine aus Warschau
- Directed by: Carl Boese
- Screenplay by: Károly Nóti; Franz Schult
- Produced by: Arnold Pressburger
- Starring: Liane Haid; Tala Birell; Fritz Schulz
- Cinematography: Curt Courant
- Edited by: Ladislao Vajda
- Music by: Artur Guttmann
- Production company: Cine-Allianz Tonfilm
- Distributed by: Südfilm AG
- Release date: 18 August 1931
- Running time: 80 minutes
- Country: Germany
- Language: German

My Cousin from Warsaw (German: Meine Cousine aus Warschau) is a 1931 German comedy film directed by Carl Boese and starring Liane Haid, Tala Birell, and Fritz Schulz. It was shot at the Babelsberg Studios in Berlin. The film's art director was Julius von Borsody. A separate French language version, Ma cousine de Varsovie, was also made, directed by Carmine Gallone. The film was based upon the play by Louis Verneuil.

== Cast ==
- Liane Haid as Sonja, the cousin from Warsaw
- Tala Birell as Lucienne
- Fritz Schulz as Fred Carteret
- S. Z. Sakall as Burel, Lucienne's Spouse
- Charles Puffy as Tobby
- Paul Kemp as the Neighbor
- Hugo Fischer-Köppe as Sonja's Chauffeur
- Leo Peukert as doctor

== Release ==
My Cousin from Warsaw was screened in Germany at the Titiana-Palast on 18 August 1931.

== Bibliography ==
- Jacobsen, Wolfgang. Babelsberg: ein Filmstudio 1912-1992. Argon, 1992.
