= Sehnsucht 202 =

1932 film directed by Max Neufeld

- Directed by: Max Neufeld
- Written by: Emeric Pressburger; Karl Farkas; Irma von Cube
- Produced by: Arnold Pressburger; Gregor Rabinovitch
- Starring: Magda Schneider; Luise Rainer
- Cinematography: Otto Kanturek; Anton Pucher
- Edited by: Else Baum
- Music by: Richard Fall
- Distributed by: UFA
- Release dates: 9 September 1932 (Austria); 15 September 1932 (Germany)
- Running time: 86 minutes
- Countries: Weimar Republic; Austria
- Language: German

Sehnsucht 202 (English title: Longing 202) is a 1932 German musical comedy film directed by Max Neufeld and distributed by UFA. Sehnsucht 202 was Luise Rainer's film debut.

== Plot ==
Set in Vienna, the film focuses on two young women. Unemployed Magda places a classified ad seeking employment. Wealthy Kitty places a classified ad offering investment in promising businesses. An incompetent desk worker gets the two ads mixed up into one. The ad triggers a reply by the two young owners of a parfume store on the brink of insolvency. All sorts of complications ensue.

== Cast ==
- Magda Schneider as Magda
- Luise Rainer as Kitty
- Fritz Schulz as Bobby
- Paul Kemp as Silber
- Rolf von Goth as Harry
- Attila Hörbiger as Paul, Magda's brother
- Mizzi Griebl as Magda's mother
- Hans Thimig as Beamter

== Reception ==
The film was received generally well. The New York Times praised Magda Schneider, calling her "impersonally pleasing as ever". The reviewer furthermore said: "Fritz Schulz did not let a comedy point get by and the cast was rounded smoothly by Rolf van Goth and Paul Kemp. Richard Fall has composed a song, "Mein Schatz, ich bin in Dein Parfüm verliebt" ("Sweetheart, I'm in Love With Your Perfume"), which will have a bad break if it remains within Central European dance orchestra borders. I have spent many worse two hours with camera and microphone."

Because of the film's success, two alternate versions were made and released shortly later: Une jeune fille et un million (1932), a French version, and Milyon avcilari (1934), a Turkish version.
