= My Heart Is Calling (film) =

1935 film directed by Carmine Gallone

My Heart is Calling
- Directed by: Carmine Gallone
- Written by: Richard Benson; Robert Edmunds; Sidney Gilliat; Ernst Marischka
- Produced by: Ivor Montagu; Arnold Pressburger
- Starring: Jan Kiepura; Mártha Eggerth; Sonnie Hale
- Cinematography: Glen MacWilliams
- Edited by: Ralph Kemplen
- Music by: Tommie Connor; Louis Levy; Harry S. Pepper
- Production companies: Cine-Allianz Tonfilmproduktions; Gaumont British Picture Corporation
- Distributed by: Gaumont British Distributors
- Release date: 8 January 1935
- Running time: 86 minutes
- Country: United Kingdom
- Language: English

My Heart Is Calling is a 1935 British musical film directed by Carmine Gallone and starring Jan Kiepura, Mártha Eggerth and Sonnie Hale. It is the English-language version of the German film My Heart Calls You and the French film Mon cœur t'appelle. It was made at Beaconsfield Studios.

== Cast ==
- Mickey Brantford as member of Rosee Opera Company
- Mártha Eggerth as Carla
- Sonnie Hale as Alphonse Rosee
- Anthony Hankey as member of Rosee Opera Company
- Anton Imkamp as member of Rosee Opera Company
- Parry Jones as member of Rosee Opera Company
- Jan Kiepura as Mario Delmonte
- Marie Lohr as Manageress of dress salon
- Percy Parsons as Customs man
- Frederick Peisley as member of Rosee Opera Company
- John Singer as Page boy
- Jeanne Stuart as Margot
- Ernest Thesiger as Fevrier
- Hilde von Stolz as member of Rosee Opera Company
- Hugh Wakefield as Armand Arvelle

== Bibliography ==
- Low, Rachael. Filmmaking in 1930s Britain. George Allen & Unwin, 1985.
- Wood, Linda. British Films, 1927-1939. British Film Institute, 1986.
