= Her Highness the Saleswoman =

1933 film

- Directed by: Karl Hartl
- Written by: Karl Hartl
- Based on: My Sister and I by Georges Berr and Louis Verneuil
- Produced by: Fritz Klotsch; Arnold Pressburger; Gregor Rabinovitch
- Starring: Liane Haid; Willi Forst; Paul Kemp
- Cinematography: Franz Planer
- Edited by: René Métain
- Music by: Ralph Benatzky; Willy Schmidt-Gentner
- Production company: Cine-Allianz Tonfilmproduktions
- Distributed by: UFA
- Release date: 4 November 1933
- Running time: 82 minutes
- Country: Germany
- Language: German

Her Highness the Saleswoman (German: Ihre Durchlaucht, die Verkäuferin) is a 1933 German comedy film directed by Karl Hartl and starring Liane Haid, Willi Forst and Paul Kemp. The film is based on the play My Sister and I by Georges Berr and Louis Verneuil. It was shot at the Babelsberg Studios in Potsdam. Location shooting took place around Lake Constance and Lindau in Bavaria. The film's sets were designed by the art director Werner Schlichting. It premiered in Hamburg and first appeared in Berlin at the city's Gloria-Palast. A separate French-language version The Princess's Whim was also produced.

== Synopsis ==
The temperamental Princess Irene falls in love with the literary historian André, but he dislikes her behaviour. Shen then pursues him pretending to be Irene's poor younger sister, who is struggling to make a living as a saleswoman in a shoe shop.

== Cast ==
- Liane Haid as Irene, Gräfin von Wittenbrugg
- Willi Forst as Dr. André Lenz
- Paul Kemp as Peter Knoll
- Hubert von Meyerinck as Paul
- Gerhard Bienert as Der Kontrolleur
- Max Gülstorff as Der Notar
- Margot Köchlin as Henriette
- Theo Lingen as Felix
- Walter Steinbeck as Der Kapitän
- Jakob Tiedtke as Ein Kunde
- Kurt von Ruffin as Otto

== Bibliography ==
- Bock, Hans-Michael & Bergfelder, Tim. The Concise CineGraph. Encyclopedia of German Cinema. Berghahn Books, 2009.
- Klaus, Ulrich J. Deutsche Tonfilme: Jahrgang 1933. Klaus-Archiv, 1988.
- Rentschler, Eric. The Ministry of Illusion: Nazi Cinema and Its Afterlife. Harvard University Press, 1996.
