= Spies at Work =

1933 film

- Directed by: Gerhard Lamprecht
- Written by: Herbert Juttke; Max W. Kimmich (novel); Georg C. Klaren (novel)
- Produced by: Arnold Pressburger; Gregor Rabinovitch
- Starring: Karl Ludwig Diehl; Brigitte Helm; Eduard von Winterstein
- Cinematography: Robert Baberske; Fritz Arno Wagner
- Music by: Giuseppe Becce
- Production company: Cine-Allianz Tonfilm
- Distributed by: UFA
- Release date: 31 March 1933
- Running time: 83 minutes
- Country: Germany
- Language: German

Spies at Work (German: Spione am Werk) is a 1933 German thriller film directed by Gerhard Lamprecht and starring Karl Ludwig Diehl, Brigitte Helm, and Eduard von Winterstein. A spy film, it is set during the First World War conflict between Austria and Italy.

The film's sets were designed by the art director Karl Weber and Erich Zander. The film was shot at the Babelsberg Studios in Berlin. A British version On Secret Service was also made.

== Cast ==
- Karl Ludwig Diehl as Michael von Hombergk, Generalstabsoffizier
- Brigitte Helm as Marchesa Marcella Galdi
- Eduard von Winterstein as Oberst von Waldmüller
- Günther Hadank as Hauptmann Larco
- Ernst Dumcke as Hauptmann Romanelli
- Theodor Loos as Davila, Kunsthändler
- Paul Otto as Conte Valenti
- Oskar Homolka as Blünzli (Agent B 18)
- Heinrich Heilinger as Der Fremde Herr
- Julius Falkenstein as Ricci, Uhrmacher
- Harry Hardt as 1. Offizier
- André Mattoni as 2. Offizier

== Bibliography ==
- Bock, Hans-Michael; Bergfelder, Tim, eds. (2009). The Concise Cinegraph: Encyclopaedia of German Cinema. New York: Berghahn Books. ISBN 978-1-57181-655-9.
