= Ernst Marischka =

Austrian screenwriter and director (1893-1963)

- Born: 2 January 1893; Vienna, Austria-Hungary
- Died: 12 May 1963 (aged 70); Chur, Switzerland
- Occupations: Screenwriter, film director
- Years active: 1913-1962

Ernst Marischka (2 January 1893 – 12 May 1963) was an Austrian screenwriter and film director. He wrote for more than 90 films between 1913 and 1962. He also directed 29 films between 1915 and 1962. He wrote and directed the Sissi trilogy - Sissi (1955), Sissi – The Young Empress (1956) and Sissi – Fateful Years of an Empress (1957). The films were based on the life of Empress Elisabeth of Austria. He was the brother of Hubert Marischka. He was named for the Academy Award for Best Original Screenplay in 1946, for A Song to Remember (1945).

== Selected filmography ==
- The Orlov, directed by Luise Fleck and Jacob Fleck (Germany, 1927, based on the operetta Der Orlow)
- The Tsar's Diamond, directed by Max Neufeld (Germany, 1932, based on the operetta Der Orlow)
- The Queen's Affair, directed by Herbert Wilcox (UK, 1934, based on the operetta Die Königin)
- Waltzes from Vienna, directed by Alfred Hitchcock (UK, 1934, based on Walzer aus Wien)
- The King Steps Out, directed by Josef von Sternberg (1936, based on the operetta Sissy)

=== Director ===
- Seven Years Hard Luck (Germany, 1940)
- Seven Years of Good Luck (German-language version, 1942)
  - Seven Years of Happiness (Italian-language version, 1943, co-director: Roberto Savarese)
- Dove andiamo, signora? (Italian-language version, 1942, co-director: Gian Maria Cominetti. Remake of I Do Not Want to Know Who You Are)
  - Abenteuer im Grand Hotel (German-language version, 1943. Remake of I Do Not Want to Know Who You Are)
- St Matthew Passion (Italy, 1949)
- Verklungenes Wien (Austria, 1951)
- Zwei in einem Auto (Austria, 1951. Remake of Companion Wanted)
- Season in Salzburg (Austria, 1952)
- Hannerl (1952) (Austria, 1952)
- Grandstand for General Staff (Austria, 1953)
- Du bist die Welt für mich (Austria, 1953)
- Hooray, It's a Boy! (West Germany, 1953)
- König der Manege (Austria, 1954)
- Victoria in Dover (Austria, 1954. Remake of Victoria in Dover)
- Die Deutschmeister (Austria, 1955. Remake of Spring Parade)
- Sissi (Austria, 1955)
- Opera Ball (Austria, 1956. Remake of Opera Ball)
- Sissi – The Young Empress (Austria, 1956)
- Scherben bringen Glück (Austria, 1957. Remake of Seven Years Hard Luck)
- Sissi – Fateful Years of an Empress (Austria, 1957)
- Embezzled Heaven (West Germany, 1958)
- The House of Three Girls (Austria, 1958)
- Old Heidelberg (West Germany, 1959)

=== Screenwriter ===
- Companion Wanted (French-language version, 1932, dir: Joe May)
  - Two in a Car (German-language version, 1932, dir: Joe May)
- The Company's in Love (Germany, 1932, dir. Max Ophüls)
- I Do Not Want to Know Who You Are (Germany, 1932, dir. Géza von Bolváry)
- Three on a Honeymoon (German-language version, 1932, dir. Erich Schmidt)
  - Honeymoon Trip (French-language version, 1933, dir. Erich Schmidt, Germain Fried)
- A Song for You (German-language version, 1933, dir: Joe May)
  - All for Love (French-language version, 1933, dir: Joe May, Henri-Georges Clouzot)
- Must We Get Divorced? (Germany, 1933, dir. Hans Behrendt)
- Rákóczi induló (Hungarian-language version, 1933, dir. Steve Sekely)
  - The Rakoczi March (German-language version, 1933, dir. Steve Sekely, Gustav Fröhlich)
- Adventure on the Southern Express (Germany, 1934, dir. Erich Waschneck)
- My Heart Calls You (German-language version, 1934, dir. Carmine Gallone)
  - My Heart Is Calling You (French-language version, 1934, dir. Carmine Gallone, Serge Véber)
- My Song for You (UK, 1934, dir: Maurice Elvey. Remake of A Song for You)
- Spring Parade (Austria, 1934, dir. Géza von Bolváry)
- Farewell Waltz (German-language version, 1934, dir. Géza von Bolváry)
  - Song of Farewell (French-language version, 1934, dir. Géza von Bolváry, Albert Valentin)
- Ihr größter Erfolg (Germany, 1934, dir. Johannes Meyer)
- My Heart Is Calling (UK, 1935, dir. Géza von Bolváry. Remake of My Heart Calls You)
- Winter Night's Dream (Germany, 1935, dir. Géza von Bolváry)
- Eva (Austria, 1935, dir. Johannes Riemann)
- Stradivari (German-language version, 1935, dir. Géza von Bolváry)
- Stradivarius (French-language version, 1935, dir. Géza von Bolváry, Albert Valentin)
- I Love All the Women (German-language version, 1935, dir. Karel Lamač)
  - J'aime toutes les femmes (French-language version, 1935, dir. Karel Lamač, Henri Decoin)
- The World's in Love (Austria, 1935, dir. Victor Tourjansky)
- Forget Me Not (Germany, 1935, dir. Augusto Genina)
- Victoria in Dover (Germany, 1936, dir. Erich Engel)
- Confetti (Austria, 1936, dir. Hubert Marischka)
- Dreams Come True (UK, 1936, dir. Reginald Denham. Remake of The World's in Love)
- Forget Me Not (UK, 1936, dir. Zoltan Korda. Remake of Forget Me Not)
- The Night With the Emperor (Germany, 1936, dir. Erich Engel)
- Dangerous Game (Germany, 1937, dir. Erich Engel)
- Frk. Møllers jubilæum (Denmark, 1937, dir. Lau Lauritzen, Alice O'Fredericks. Remake of Winter Night's Dream)
- The Charm of La Boheme (Austria, 1937, dir. Géza von Bolváry)
- Immer wenn ich glücklich bin (Austria, 1938, dir. Karel Lamač)
- Die unruhigen Mädchen (Austria, 1938, dir. Géza von Bolváry)
- Julia jubilerar (Sweden, 1938, dir. Lau Lauritzen, Alice O'Fredericks. Remake of Winter Night's Dream)
- Dir gehört mein Herz (German-language version, 1938, dir. Carmine Gallone)
  - Marionette (Italian-language version, 1939, dir. Carmine Gallone)
- Das Abenteuer geht weiter (Germany, 1939, dir. Carmine Gallone)
- The Dream of Butterfly (Italy, 1939, dir. Carmine Gallone)
- Opera Ball (Germany, 1939, dir. Géza von Bolváry)
- Two on a Vacation (Italy, 1940, dir. Carlo Ludovico Bragaglia. Remake of Companion Wanted)
- Vienna Tales (Germany, 1940, dir. Géza von Bolváry)
- Spring Parade (1940, dir. Henry Koster. Remake of Spring Parade)
- Eternal Melodies (Italy, 1940, dir. Carmine Gallone)
- Roses in Tyrol (Germany, 1940, dir. Géza von Bolváry)
- Thrice Wed (Germany, 1941, dir. Géza von Bolváry)
- Mistress Moon (Germany, 1941, dir. Theo Lingen)
- Vienna Blood (Germany, 1942, dir. Willi Forst)
- In flagranti (Germany, 1944, dir. Hans Schweikart)
- Schrammeln (Germany, 1944, dir. Géza von Bolváry)
- A Song to Remember (1945, dir. Charles Vidor. Remake of Abschiedswalzer)
- Die Fledermaus (Germany, 1946, dir. Géza von Bolváry)
- Tell the Truth (West Germany, 1946, dir. Helmut Weiss)
- Addio Mimí! (Italy, 1949, dir. Carmine Gallone. Remake of The Charm of La Boheme)
- Wedding Night in Paradise (West Germany, 1950, dir. Géza von Bolváry)
- Love and Blood (Italian-language version, 1951, dir. Marino Girolami)
  - Shadows Over Naples (German-language version, 1951, dir. Hans Wolff)
- Ohne Dich kann ich nicht leben (Italy, 1958, dir. Giulio Del Torre, Arthur Maria Rabenalt. Remake of Forget Me Not)
- Season in Salzburg (Austria, 1961, dir. Franz Josef Gottlieb. Remake of Season in Salzburg)
- Wedding Night in Paradise (Austria, 1962, dir. Paul Martin. Remake of Wedding Night in Paradise)
