= Egon Wilden =

German painter (1894–1931)

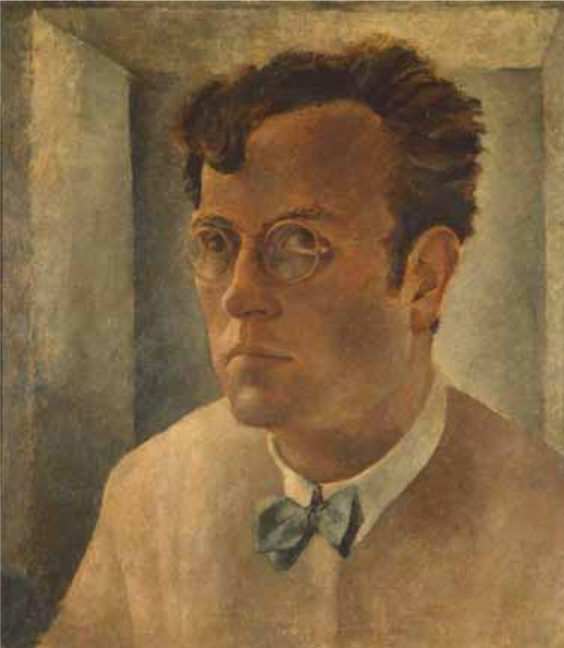
Egon Wilden, Self-portrait in a bow tie (Selbstporträt mit Fliege), c. 1930

Egon Wilden (8 December 1894, in Düsseldorf – 7 September 1931, in Ahlen, Westphalia) was a German painter and set-designer.

== Life ==
Wilden began his studies at the Kunstakademie Düsseldorf, but they were interrupted until 1919 by World War I. One of his most important teachers there was Heinrich Nauen, a proponent of Rhenish Expressionism. His work was influenced by that school and other trends of the time. Watercolours and pastels formed a major part of his oeuvre. He received early recognition as a set-designer around the time of the 1919–20 season at the Schauspielhaus Düsseldorf, which developed into one of the most modern theatres in the German-speaking world under the direction of Louise Dumont and Gustav Lindemann. He was later taken on by theatres in Herne, Gera, Hagen, Barmen-Elberfeld and Cologne, producing a total of around two hundred set designs, featuring vivid colours and often vertical emphases, front-facing architectural motifs and perspectives creating several illusory rooms.

He left the theatre behind in 1930 to work as an independent artist, though he did marry the actress Hedwig Sparrer. He moved into a studio in an artists' house in Düsseldorf-Stockum in January 1931 but in the summer of that year his health began to deteriorate. He died soon afterwards whilst staying with friends in Ahlen. His work remained largely unknown until 2005, when his niece donated a large collection of his paintings and drawings to the Förderkreis of the Kunstmuseum Ahlen. Since then his works have been the subject of several exhibitions.

== Selected works ==
- Flight into Egypt, 1919
- Two figures in a wood, watercolour, 1920
- God's Love, watercolour (set designs for a production of Die Liebe Gottes by Hermine von Boetticher), c.1920
- The Barber of Seville, set design for the Theater Hagen, 1924
- Paul Kemp, portrait in pencil, c. 1925
- Elektra, set design for the Theater Hagen, 1927
- Angelina, set design for the Theater Köln, 1929
- Self-portrait in bow tie, oil on panel, c. 1930, Theaterwissenschaftliche Sammlung Universität zu Köln
- The Martyrdom of St Sebastian
- Pieta
- Lichtflut (literally A Flood of Light)
- Strahlen (literally Radiating)
- Trees in Light
- Loneliness, Aquarell
- Mourning, Aquarell
- Painter in his Studio

== Literature ==
- (in German) Elmar Buck (ed.): Egon Wilden. Maler und Bühnenbildner, 1894–1931. Ausstellungskatalog der Theaterwissenschaftlichen Sammlung der Universität zu Köln, des Theatermuseums Düsseldorf und des Ernst-Osthaus-Museums Hagen, Köln 1994
- (in German) Joachim Geil: Egon Wilden. Der Maler und die Bühne. Teiresias-Verlag, Köln 1999, ISBN 978-3-98058-605-4
- (in German) Burkhard Leismann (ed.), Kinga Luchs, Martina Padberg (Redaktion): Egon Wilden. Leben und Werk, 1894–1931. Förderkreis Kunstmuseum Ahlen e.V., Verlag Hachmannedition, Bremen 2009, ISBN 978-3-93942-969-2
