= I Love All the Women =

1935 German film

- Directed by: Karel Lamac
- Written by: Ernst Marischka
- Produced by: Fritz Klotsch; Arnold Pressburger; Gregor Rabinovitch
- Starring: Jan Kiepura; Theo Lingen; Lien Deyers
- Cinematography: Friedl Behn-Grund
- Edited by: Ella Ensink
- Music by: Robert Stolz
- Production company: Cine-Allianz
- Distributed by: UFA
- Release date: 30 August 1935
- Running time: 89 minutes
- Country: Germany
- Language: German

I Love All the Women (German: Ich liebe alle Frauen) is a 1935 German musical comedy film directed by Karel Lamac and starring Jan Kiepura, Theo Lingen and Lien Deyers. The film's sets were designed by the art directors Hermann Warm and Karl Haacker. A separate French-language version J'aime toutes les femmes was also produced with Keipura appearing alongside Danielle Darrieux.

== Cast ==
- Jan Kiepura as Jan Morena & Edi Jaworski
- Theo Lingen as Hans Heinz Hinz
- Lien Deyers as Susi
- Adele Sandrock as Fürstin Loridowska
- Rudolf Platte as Bernhard, Gardrobier
- Fritz Imhoff as Sebastian Weismaier
- Margarete Kupfer as Frau Schmidt
- Inge List as Camilla Weismaier, Tochter
- Hans Hermann Schaufuß as Graf Hartenstein
- Heinz Salfner as H. G. Benfield, amerik. Zeitungsinhaber
- Paul Beckers as Ein Taschenspieler
- Karin Luesebrink as Eine Blumenverkäuferin
- Paul Bildt as Ein Ladeninhaber

== Bibliography ==
- Heuckelom, Kris Van. Polish Migrants in European Film 1918–2017. Springer, 2019.
- Klaus, Ulrich J. Deutsche Tonfilme: Jahrgang 1935. Klaus-Archiv, 1988.
