= Paul Kemp (actor) =

German actor (1896–1953)

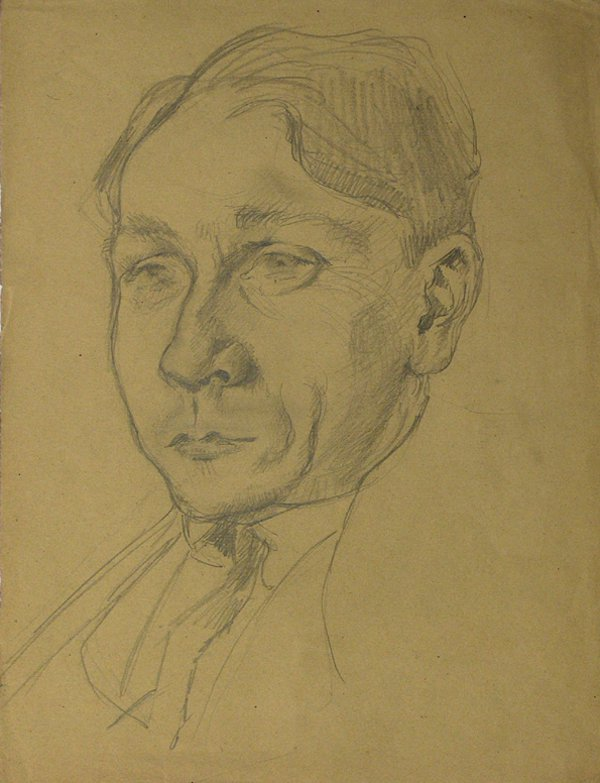
- Paul Kemp, sketch circa 1925 by Egon Wilden
- Born: 20 May 1896; Bad Godesberg, German Empire
- Died: 13 August 1953 (aged 57); Bad Godesberg, West Germany
- Other name: Paul Peter Kemp
- Occupation: Film actor
- Years active: 1920–1953

Paul Kemp (20 May 1896 – 13 August 1953) was a German stage and film actor. Kemp worked as a piano accompaniest for silent films, and then served as an ambulance driver on the Western Front during the First World War. Post-war he moved into acting on the stage in Düsseldorf and Hamburg. His career really took off when he moved to Berlin in 1929, appearing in the hit stage version of the novel Menschen im Hotel by Vicki Baum. He made his film debut in 1930, shortly after the introduction of sound film. He appeared prolifically in German and Austrian films until his death in 1953.

== Selected filmography ==
- Cyanide (1930) – Kuckuck
- The Shot in the Sound Film Studio (1930) – Aufnahmeleiter
- The King of Paris (1930)
- Rag Ball (1930) – Priem
- The Great Longing (1930) – Regieassistent Mopp
- Dolly Gets Ahead (1930) – Jack
- The Blonde Nightingale (1930) – Hirschfield
- The Threepenny Opera (1931) – Mackie Messers Platte
- Seitensprünge (1931) – Anton Schiller
- M (1931) – Pickpocket with Six Watches
- My Cousin from Warsaw (1931) – Der Nachbar
- The Theft of the Mona Lisa (1931) – Polizeileutnant
- By a Nose (1931) – Sperling, ein Rennbahnbesucher
- The Soaring Maiden (1931) – Dr. Kurt Winter
- Berlin-Alexanderplatz (1931)
- An Auto and No Money (1932) – Peter Knopf, Auslagendekorateur
- Three from the Unemployment Office (1932) – Arthur Jaenicke, Arbeitsloser
- Gitta Discovers Her Heart (1932) – Fred, sein Freund
- The Bartered Bride (1932) – Wenzel – ihr Sohn
- Sehnsucht 202 (1932) – Splitter / Silber
- Mieter Schulze gegen alle (1932)
- Gypsies of the Night (1932) – Julius
- A Man with Heart (1932) – Rochus Sperling
- A Song for You (1933) – Charlie, Gattis Impresario
- Roman einer Nacht (1933) – Nissen, ein Diener
- Invisible Opponent (1933) – Hans Mertens
- Her Highness the Saleswoman (1933) – Peter Knoll
- The Castle in the South (1933) – Ottoni
- The Song of Happiness (1933) – Bernhard Probst, sein Freund
- The Fugitive from Chicago (1933) – August P. Lemke, Buchhalter
- Mit dir durch dick und dünn (1934) – Kasimir Lampe, Bildhauer
- My Heart Calls You (1934) – Director Rosé
- My Heart Is Calling You (1934) – Homme dans le casino (uncredited)
- The Csardas Princess (1934) – Graf Bonipart Kancsianu
- Charley's Aunt (1934) – Fancourt 'Babbs' Babberley
- Prinzessin Turandot (1934) – Willibald
- Amphitryon (1935) – Götterbote Merkur / Diener Sosias
- The King's Prisoner (1935) – Fritz Böttger
- The Valiant Navigator (1935) – Berthold Jebs
- E lucean le stelle (1935)
- The Bashful Casanova (1936) – Innocenz Freisleben
- Hot Blood (1936) – Jozsi – Faktotum
- Boccaccio (1936) – Calandrino – Verleger und Buchdrucker
- Glückskinder (1936) – Frank Black
- Flowers from Nice (1936) – Rudi Hofer
- The Charm of La Boheme (1937) – Pierre Casale
- The Missing Wife (1937) – Ferdinand Bartel
- Musik für dich (1937)
- Ihr Leibhusar (1938) – Bunko
- Capriccio (1938) – Henri de Grau
- Dir gehört mein Herz (1938) – Ricco
- Unsere kleine Frau (1938) – Bobby Brown
- Mia moglie si diverte (1938) – Paolo
- The Stars Shine (1938) – Himself
- Marionette (1939) – Rico
- Another Experience (1939) – Hausmann – Gardrobier
- Madame Butterfly (1939) – Richard Hell
- Kornblumenblau (1939)
- Was wird hier gespielt? (1940)
- Das leichte Mädchen (1940) – Bertel
- Small Town Poet (1940) – Paul Schleemüller, Stadtsekretär
- Mistress Moon (1941) – Max
- Immer nur Du (1941) – Sepp Zeisig
- Jenny und der Herr im Frack (1941) – Willy Krag
- A Gust of Wind (1942) – Emanuele Rigattieri
- The Big Number (1943) – Otto Gellert
- Fahrt ins Abenteuer (1943) – Rudi Waschek
- The Song of the Nightingale (1944) – Kapellmeister Schnepf
- Sieben Briefe (1944) – Kramer, Bildschriftleiter
- Glück unterwegs (1944) – Dramaturg Gustav
- Dir zuliebe (1944) – Karl Sinn
- Leuchtende Schatten (1945)
- Ghost in the Castle (1947) – Waldemar
- Lysistrata (1947) – Damon
- The Singing House (1947) – Karli Weidner
- Liebe nach Noten (1947) – Maximilian Schmidt
- The Heavenly Waltz (1948) – Spaatz
- Insolent and in Love (1948) – Der alte Pernrieder, Clarissas Großvater
- Lambert Feels Threatened (1949) – Bobby
- Dangerous Guests (1949) – Amadeus Strohmayer
- Unknown Sender (1950) – Schuldiener Bock
- Kein Engel ist so rein (1950) – Paul-Theodor
- The Man in Search of Himself (1950) – Theobald Finger
- Mädchen mit Beziehungen (1950) – Hahn
- Nacht ohne Sünde (1950) – Friedrich
- Third from the Right (1950) – Hähnchen
- The Midnight Venus (1951) – Hansl
- Engel im Abendkleid (1951)
- Mutter sein dagegen sehr! (1951) – "Häschen" Haas
- Das unmögliche Mädchen (1951) – Kronbecher
- In München steht ein Hofbräuhaus (1951) – Otto Kackelmann
- The Thief of Bagdad (1952) – Kalif Omar
- Queen of the Arena (1952) – Fritz Zwickel, Faktotum Mahnkes
- Salto Mortale (1953) – Willi
- A Musical War of Love (1953) – Prof. Melchior Quint
- Drei, von denen man spricht (1953) – Otto Kistenkugel (final film role)

== Bibliography ==
- Bock, Hans-Michael; Bergfelder, Tim, eds. (2009). The Concise Cinegraph: Encyclopaedia of German Cinema. New York: Berghahn Books. ISBN 978-1-57181-655-9.
