= Albrecht Joseph =

German playwright, screenwriter and film editor

- Born: 20 November 1901; Frankfurt, German Empire
- Died: 28 April 1991 (aged 89); Los Angeles, California, United States
- Occupations: Writer, Editor
- Years active: 1941–1967 (film & TV)
- Spouse: Anna Mahler (1969–1988)

Albrecht Joseph (1901–1991) was a German playwright, screenwriter and film editor.

== Biography ==
Due to his Jewish heritage Joseph was forced to leave Germany following the Nazi Party's takeover in 1933. He initially went to Austria and then on to Italy and Britain. He finally settled in the United States in 1939 and was employed occasionally in Hollywood where he was sometimes credited as Al Joseph. His final work was on the western television series Gunsmoke, editing over hundred and fifty episodes.

== Selected filmography ==
- The Captain from Köpenick (1931)
- Peter Voss, Thief of Millions (1932)
- Tell Me Tonight (1932)
- The Song of Night (1932)
- One Night's Song (1933)
- The Secret of Cavelli (1934)
- Fresh Wind from Canada (1935)
- Girls in Distress (1939)
- Three Russian Girls (1943)
- Hitler's Madman (1943)
- A Scandal in Paris (1946)
- Loan Shark (1952)
- Second Chance (1953)
- The Great Man (1956)
- Desert Hell (1958)

== Bibliography ==
- Robert von Dassanowsky. Austrian Cinema: A History. McFarland, 2005.
