= Mischa Spoliansky =

Russian-German composer (1898–1985)

Mischa Spoliansky Миша Сполянский
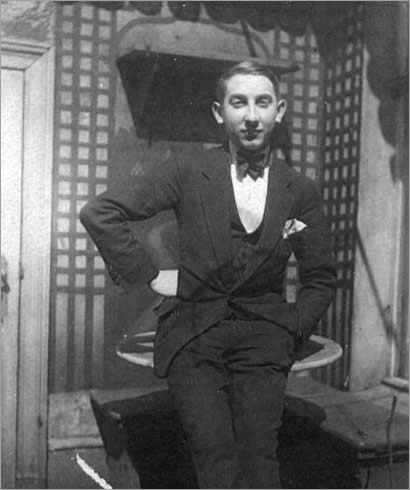
- Spoliansky, c. 1914

Background information
- Also known as: Arno Billing
- Born: Mikhail Pavlovich Spoliansky; 28 December 1898; Belostok, Belostok Oblast, Russian Empire (present-day Białystok, Podlaskie Voivodeship, Poland)
- Died: 28 June 1985 (aged 86) London, England
- Genres: Cabaret; revue; schlager; film score
- Occupation: Composer
- Instrument: Piano

Mikhail Pavlovich Spoliansky (Russian: Михаил Павлович Сполянский, romanized: Mikhail Pavlovich Spolyanskiy; 28 December 1898 – 28 June 1985) was a Russian-German composer. He made his name writing cabaret and revue songs in the Weimar Republic, but was forced to emigrate to London in 1933 following the rise of Nazism and stayed in Britain for the rest of his life, re-inventing himself as a composer of film scores.

== Early life and education ==
Spoliansky was born into a Jewish, musical family in Białystok, then part of the Belostok Oblast of the Russian Empire (present-day Podlaskie Voivodeship, Poland). His father Pavel (Paul) Spoliansky was an baritone opera singer and his sister, Lisa, would later become a pianist and his brother Alexander (Schura) was a cellist. After the birth of Mischa the family moved to Warsaw, and later Kalisz. After the early death of his mother, the family moved to Vienna.

Spoliansky's early musical education in piano, violin and cello began at the age of five and was continued in Dresden under Professor Mark Günzburg. He made his public debut aged 10. Shortly thereafter, his father died and Spoliansky moved to Königsberg (Prussia) where he had relatives. In 1914 however as a result of the war he had to flee to Berlin, where his brother worked as a cellist and his sister Lisa, a pianist, began studies with Artur Schnabel.

== Berlin, cabaret and revue ==
Spoliansky worked in a coffeehouse as a pianist in order to continue his musical education at the Stern'sches Konservatorium. Spoliansky's first compositions were played by the UFA-Filmtheaterorchester in Friedrichstraße. In addition he worked as a composer and pianist in a pit orchestra (where Marlene Dietrich played in the second violins) and in a Russian émigré cabaret. There Friedrich Hollaender and Werner Richard Heymann heard him and invited him to write and play for the literary cabaret Schall und Rauch in the basement of the Großes Schauspielhaus, which Max Reinhardt had founded in 1919. Spoliansky set the texts of Kurt Tucholsky, Klabund, Joachim Ringelnatz, and accompanied stars such as Gussy Holl, Paul O'Montis, Rosa Valetti and Trude Hesterberg.

In 1920 under the pseudonym "Arno Billing" he composed the melody for the first homosexual anthem called Das lila Lied, (The Lavender Song) which he dedicated to Magnus Hirschfeld, the sexologist who attracted the young Christopher Isherwood to Berlin a decade later. It was published with other texts such as "Sei meine Frau für vierundzwanzig Stunden".

In 1922 he met the poet Marcellus Schiffer and the diseuse Margo Lion. He married the dancer Elsbeth (Eddy) Reinwald in the same year. In 1927 Spoliansky accompanied Richard Tauber in a recording of 12 songs from Schubert's Winterreise, having recorded an album of 12 German folk-songs with the tenor in the previous year.

On May 15, 1928, the musical revue Es liegt in der Luft opened at the Komödie am Kurfürstendamm, Berlin, with music by Spoliansky and lyrics by Marcellus Schiffer. Viktor Rotthaler has described it as "the first attempt at a German language musical. The music draws on influences from American jazz and Argentine tango now characteristic of the cabaret music of Berlin in the 1920s. Marlene Dietrich was in the cast. One year later Dietrich would be "discovered" in Spoliansky's revue Zwei Krawatten (text by Georg Kaiser) by Josef von Sternberg, who was searching for the leading actress for The Blue Angel.

There followed in 1930 Wie werde ich reich und glücklich?, in 1931 Alles Schwindel, in 1932 Rufen Sie Herrn Plim and Das Haus dazwischen, and in 1933 100 Meter Glück.

== Emigration to London and film work ==
When Hitler came to power in 1933, Spoliansky, like all Jewish artists in Germany, was no longer allowed to work in the now "Aryan" entertainment business. He was forced to emigrate to London, where he began a second career as a film composer. He was taken under the wing of the expatriate film community, as well as British producers and directors, such as Alfred Hitchcock, who had made films in Berlin in what had been, until Hitler's rule, the international centre for film production. Spoliansky's naturalisation as a British national succeeded in large part thanks to Schlager "Heute Nacht oder nie" from the film Das Lied einer Nacht (1932), which made Spoliansky world-renowned.

In 1935, he was hired by Zoltan Korda to compose the music for Sanders of the River, which was being shot on location in Nigeria. This included songs that were meant to be "authentic" Nigerian music, performed by star Paul Robeson, and the local Nigerian cast members and extras, but they were composed in London by Spoliansky. Many years later, Korda was delighted to discover, in a remote river in the Congo, Spoliansky's theme song for the film being sung by Congolese fishermen as they paddled their boats upriver. Spoliansky had never been to Africa, but his work was so authentic that it became, in a sense, genuinely authentic.

Sanders of the River began a collaboration with Robeson. Among his very best songs were the four that he wrote for Robeson featured in Sanders of the River in 1935 ("The Canoe Song", "Love Song", "Congo Lullabye" and "The Killing Song") and King Solomon's Mines in 1937 ("Ho, Ho" and "Climbing Up!"). Another of his songs was performed by Elisabeth Welch in 1937 ("Red Hot Annabelle"). Other film successes included "Dedication" (the theme from Idol of Paris), the music for The Happiest Days of Your Life and "The Melba Waltz (Dream Time)" from Melba. He also continued writing for the theatre: the musical Who's Taking Liberty? ran for 59 performance at the Whitehall Theatre in 1939. In 1943, Spoliansky gave a recital of his own film music in London.

== Later career ==
In 1950, Hitchcock remembered Spoliansky, and hired him to write the song "Love Is Lyrical (Whisper Sweet Little Nothing to Me)", performed by Marlene Dietrich in the film Stage Fright. In later years he composed scores for films such as Trouble in Store (1953), Saint Joan (1957), The Whole Truth (1958), North West Frontier (1959), The Battle of the Villa Fiorita (1965), The Best House in London (1969) and Hitler: The Last Ten Days (1973), on which he clearly had a personal perspective.

Post-war revues in London include One, Two, Three (1947) and Four, Five, Six (1948), both at the Duke of York's Theatre and both starring Binnie Hale. In the 1950s and 1960s Spoliansky attempted to re-introduce the German public to the musical, first with Katharina Knie (1957) in Munich – based on a circus story and dealing with themes of vagrant life and settledness – and then with Wie lernt man Liebe (1967), also in Munich, at the Cuvilliés-Theater. These met with little success, probably due to anti-American sentiment in Germany at the time. Spoliansky returned to Berlin in 1977 to appear at a gala in the Renaissance Theatre, and made several return visits over the next few years.

He was also a composer of concert works, such as his Symphony in Five Movements, composed over a long period between 1941 and 1969. This work, along with his orchestral jazz piece Boogie (1958) and the overture to his last stage show My Husband and I (aka Wie lernt man Liebe) were recorded by the Liepāja Symphony Orchestra conducted by Paul Mann, in 2022. There are also some small piano pieces.

In 1976, Spoliansky was interviewed for the American documentary Memories of Berlin: The Twilight of Weimar Culture. He remained Dietrich's regular confident right up until his death in London in 1985 at the age of 87.

== Legacy ==
Since his death, his works have occasionally been produced in theatres. For example, the 1932 cabaret opera Rufen Sie Herrn Plim (as Send for Mr Plin) had a successful production at the Battersea Arts Centre in 1999, transferring to Covent Garden the following year. In the 2004/2005 season Zwei Krawatten was produced in Dortmund, and Rufen Sie Herrn Plim in the Städtischen Bühnen Münster (2002/2003) and later in a theatre in Kassel. All Spoliansky archives are held in the Akademie der Künste, Berlin.

== Works ==
Theatre

- Cabaret songs, including Das lila Lied (1920s)
- Es liegt in der Luft, revue (1928)
- Zwei Krawatten, revue (1929)
- Wie werde ich reich und glücklich?, revue (1930)
- Alles Schwindel, revue (1931)
- Rufen Sie Herrn Plim, revue (1932)
- Das Haus dazwischen, revue (1932)
- 100 Meter Glück, revue (1933)
- Who's Taking Liberty? musical (1939)
- One, Two, Three, revue (1947)
- Four Five, Six, revue (1948)
- Katharina Knie, musical (1957)
- Wie lernt man Liebe, musical (1957)

Film scores

- No More Love (1931)
- Calais-Dover (1931)
- The Schlemihl (1931)
- For Once I'd Like to Have No Troubles (1932)
- The Song of Night (1932)
- The Lucky Number (1932)
- One Night's Song (1933)
- Love at Second Sight (1934)
- My Song for You (1934)
- Sanders of the River (1935)
- The Ghost Goes West (1935)
- The Man Who Could Work Miracles (1936)
- Forget Me Not (1936)
- King Solomon's Mines (1937)
- Paradise for Two (1937)
- Jeannie (1941)
- Mr. Emmanuel (1944)
- Don't Take It to Heart (1944)
- Idol of Paris (1948)
- This Was a Woman (1948)
- Under the Frozen Falls (1948)
- Golden Arrow (1949)
- The Happiest Days of Your Life (1950)
- Into the Blue (1950)
- Happy Go Lovely (1951)
- Trouble in Store (1953)
- Saint Joan (1957)
- The Whole Truth (1958)
- North West Frontier (1959)
- The Battle of the Villa Fiorita (1965)
- The Best House in London (1969)
- Hitler: The Last Ten Days (1973)

Concert

- Charleston Caprice, orchestra (1930)
- Boogie, orchestra (1958)
- Symphony in Five Movements (1941-1969)
- My Husband and I overture (1958) (from Wie lernt man Liebe)
- King Solomon's Mines, suite (three movements, arr. Philip Lane)
