= Irma von Cube =

American screenwriter (1899–1977)

Irma von Cube (December 26, 1899, Hanover – July 25, 1977) was a German-American screenwriter. She began as an actress and a writer for films in Germany in the early 1930s, and continued when she arrived in the United States in 1938.

Among her films are They Shall Have Music (1939), Johnny Belinda (1948), for which she received an Academy Award nomination, and Song of Love (1947) co-starring Katharine Hepburn, Paul Henreid, and Robert Walker. She also directed one of five segments of the Italy-UK co-production anthology film A Tale of Five Cities (1951). She was the mother of Oscar-winning producer Konstantin Kalser.

== Filmography ==
- Mädchenschicksale (dir. Richard Löwenbein, 1928)
- What Price Love? (dir. E. W. Emo, 1929)
- Farewell (dir. Robert Siodmak, 1930)
- Dolly Gets Ahead (dir. Anatole Litvak, 1930)
- The Stolen Face (dir. Philipp Lothar Mayring and Erich Schmidt, 1930)
- No More Love (dir. Anatole Litvak, 1931)
  - Calais-Dover (dir. Anatole Litvak and Jean Boyer, 1931)
- Der Hochtourist (dir. Alfred Zeisler, 1931)
- The Cheeky Devil (dir. Carl Boese and Heinz Hille, 1932)
  - You Will Be My Wife (dir. Carl Boese, Heinz Hille and Serge de Poligny, 1932)
- The Song of Night (dir. Anatole Litvak, 1932)
  - Tell Me Tonight (dir. Anatole Litvak, 1932)
  - One Night's Song (dir. Anatole Litvak, 1933)
- Sehnsucht 202 (dir. Max Neufeld, 1932)
  - Une jeune fille et un million (dir. Max Neufeld and Fred Ellis, 1932)
- Eine von uns (dir. Johannes Meyer, 1932)
- A Song for You (dir. Joe May, 1933)
  - Tout pour l'amour (dir. Joe May and Henri-Georges Clouzot, 1933)
  - My Song for You (dir. Maurice Elvey, 1934)
- Mayerling (dir. Anatole Litvak, 1936)
- La Peur (dir. Victor Tourjansky, 1936)
- The Terrible Lovers (dir. Marc Allégret, 1936)
- Street of Shadows (dir. G. W. Pabst, 1937)
  - Under Secret Orders (dir. Edmond T. Gréville, 1937)
- They Shall Have Music (dir. Archie Mayo, 1939)
- Song of Love (dir. Clarence Brown, 1947)
- Johnny Belinda (dir. Jean Negulesco, 1948)
- The Girl in White (dir. John Sturges, 1952)

Director

- A Tale of Five Cities (1951)

Actress

- Nameless Heroes (1925)
