= No More Love (film) =

1931 film

- Directed by: Anatole Litvak
- Written by: Irma von Cube; Anatole Litvak; Felix Jackson; Curt J. Braun; Fritz Falkenstein
- Based on: Dover-Calais by Julius Berstl
- Produced by: Noë Bloch; Arnold Pressburger; Gregor Rabinovitch
- Starring: Lilian Harvey; Harry Liedtke; Felix Bressart
- Cinematography: Robert Baberske; Franz Planer
- Edited by: Aleksandr Uralsky
- Music by: Mischa Spoliansky
- Production companies: Bloch-Rabinowitsch-Produktion; UFA
- Distributed by: UFA
- Release date: 27 July 1931
- Running time: 88 minutes
- Country: Germany
- Language: German

No More Love (German: Nie wieder Liebe) is a 1931 German musical comedy film directed by Anatole Litvak and starring Lilian Harvey, Harry Liedtke and Felix Bressart. It is based on Julius Berstl's novel Dover-Calais. It was shot at the Babelsberg Studios in Berlin and on location along the French Riviera including Nice. The film's art direction was by Werner Schlichting. A separate French-language version Calais-Dover was also released.

== Cast ==
- Lilian Harvey as Gladys O'Halloran
- Harry Liedtke as Sandercroft
- Felix Bressart as Jean
- Margo Lion as Eine Stimmungssängerin
- Oskar Marion as Jack
- Julius Falkenstein as Dr. Baskett
- Hermann Speelmans as Tom
- Theo Lingen as Rhinelander
- Raoul Lange as Der Spanier
- Louis Brody as Der Koch
- Rina Marsa as Claire
- Konstantin Kalser as Der Schiffsjunge
- Hans Behal as Charlie
- Mischa Spoliansky as Piano Man

== Bibliography ==
- Grange, William (2008). Cultural Chronicle of the Weimar Republic. Scarecrow Press. ISBN 978-0-8108-5967-8.
