= I Do Not Want to Know Who You Are =

1932 film directed by Géza von Bolváry

- Directed by: Géza von Bolváry
- Written by: Gustav Holm; Ernst Marischka
- Produced by: Siegfried Fritz Fromm
- Starring: Liane Haid; Gustav Fröhlich; S.Z. Sakall
- Cinematography: Willy Goldberger
- Music by: Robert Stolz
- Production company: Boston-Film
- Distributed by: Metropol-Filmverleih; Tobis Film
- Release date: 9 September 1932
- Running time: 95 minutes
- Country: Germany
- Language: German

I Do Not Want to Know Who You Are (German: Ich will nicht wissen, wer du bist) is a 1932 German comedy film directed by Géza von Bolváry and starring Liane Haid, Gustav Fröhlich, and S.Z. Sakall.

The film's sets were designed by the art director Franz Schroedter.

== Cast ==
- Liane Haid as Alice Lamberg
- Gustav Fröhlich as Robert Lindt
- S.Z. Sakall as Ottokar
- Max Gülstorff as Präsident Führing
- Fritz Odemar as Fritz von Schröder
- Leonard Steckel as Alvarez Zambesi
- Vera Spohr as Carmen Zambesi
- Adele Sandrock as Emerenzia
- Betty Bird as Käthe, ihre Nichte
- Julius E. Herrmann as Kommerzienrat Blume
- Lotte Lorring as Helga, seine Frau
- Erika Helmke as Zofe

== Bibliography ==
- Bock, Hans-Michael; Bergfelder, Tim, eds. (2009). The Concise Cinegraph: Encyclopaedia of German Cinema. New York: Berghahn Books. ISBN 978-1-57181-655-9.
