= Jan Kiepura =

Polish singer and actor (1902–1966)

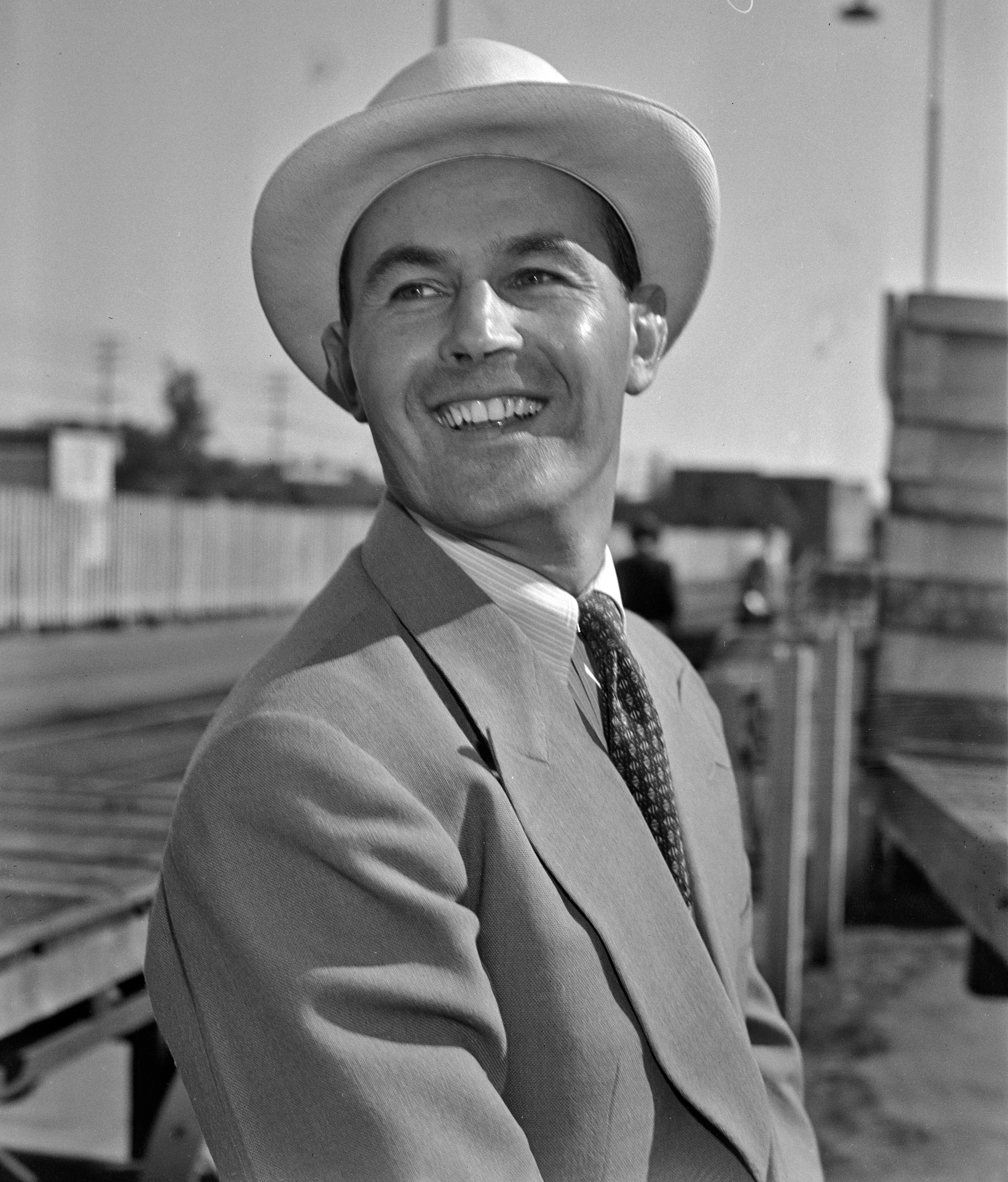
- Kiepura in 1935
- Born: Jan Wiktor Kiepura; May 16, 1902; Sosnowiec, Poland
- Died: August 15, 1966 (aged 64); Harrison, New York, US
- Resting place: Powązki, Poland
- Monuments: Sosnowiec, Krynica-Zdrój
- Other name: Jean Kiepura
- Occupations: singer (lyric tenor)/(lirico spinto),(Heldentenor) and actor
- Spouse: Marta Eggerth (m. 1936)

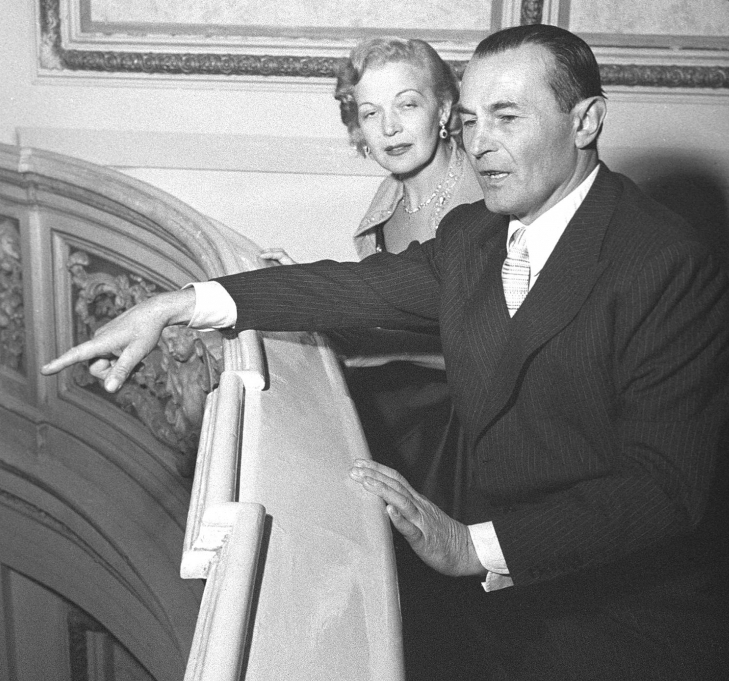
Marta Eggerth and Jan Kiepura (1954)

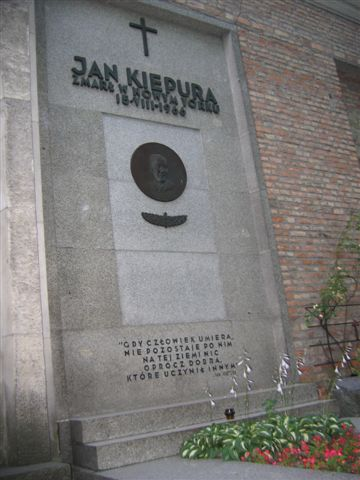
Grave of Kiepura at Powązki Cemetery in Warsaw

Jan Wiktor Kiepura (Polish: [ˈjan ˈviktɔr kʲɛˈpura]; May 16, 1902 – August 15, 1966) was a Polish opera singer (lyric tenor / lirico spinto, Heldentenor) and actor. He enjoyed a successful international career and performed at leading opera houses around the world including La Scala, Metropolitan Opera, Royal Opera House, Opéra-Comique, La Fenice and Teatro Colón. He was the recipient of numerous national and international distinctions and honours including Poland's Order of Polonia Restituta, France's Legion of Honour and Sweden's Order of the Polar Star.

== Life and career ==
Jan Kiepura was born in Sosnowiec, Poland, the son of Maria « Miriam » (née Neuman), a former professional singer, and Franciszek Kiepura, a baker and grocery owner. His mother came from a Jewish family but converted to Christianity. He had a brother, Władysław. During 1916–1920, he attended the Junior School in Sosnowiec where he graduated from high school. In 1921 he studied law at the University of Warsaw. He learned singing from Wacław Brzeziński and Tadeusz Leliwa. In 1923 he performed his first concert in the Sphinx cinema in Sosnowiec. In 1924, Jan Kiepura was admitted by Emil Młynarski to the local choir. He played the role of Góral in Moniuszko's opera Halka. He also took part in a production of Gounod's Faust in Lwów (now Lviv, Ukraine).

In 1926, Jan Kiepura left Poland for an international career in Germany, Hungary, France, and England. When he returned to Poland, with the money he had earned from his performances, he built the well-known hotel Patria in the border town of Krynica-Zdrój, which cost him about US$3 million. Some Polish movies were made there. Kiepura played in twelve Polish musicals, including O czym się nie myśli (1926), Die Singende Stadt (Neapol, śpiewające miasto) (1930), Tout Pour L'amour (Zdobyć cię muszę) (1933), and Mon coeur t'appelle (1934).

=== Return to Warsaw ===
Kiepura's return to Warsaw in 1934 caused a sensation in the Polish capital, and his musical shows were received with huge enthusiasm. Apart from his performances in concert halls, he also sang to a crowd gathered under the balcony of the Warsaw hotel "Bristol". He also sang while standing on the roof of his car, or from the window of a carriage, and also spoke to the audience. Kiepura introduced himself as "The Great Kiepura", to the annoyance of similarly temperamental individuals. However, he was not a frequent guest in Poland. He signed contracts with Covent Garden in London, Opéra Comique in Paris and National Opera in Berlin. Kiepura also started a film career, working with Berlin's UFA and then with the Motion Picture Industry in Hollywood. He played in many films, of which the most famous are: The Singing City, The Song of Night, Ich liebe alle Frauen, The Charm of La Boheme, The Land of Smiles.

=== Marriage ===
On October 31, 1936, Kiepura married the Hungarian-born lyric soprano Marta Eggerth (1912–2013). The two often sang together in operettas, in concerts, on records, and in films until his death. In 1937 Kiepura and Eggerth were forced to flee Europe due to the rise of German Nazism. They emigrated to the United States.

=== Death ===
He died at the age of 64 in New York and was buried in Powązki Cemetery, Warsaw.

== Chronology ==
- 1927: performances in Budapest, Berlin, Vienna, London (Royal Albert Hall), Stuttgart, Munich and Prague. Faust, Calaf, and Stranger ("Miracle Heliana" Korngold) in Vienna. Concerts in Warsaw, Lwów, Gdańsk.
- 1928: performances in Budapest, a three-year contract with La Scala, debut in the role of Calaf, and then he sings well and Mario Cavaradossi, the premiere of Le Preziose ridicole of Lattuada under the baton of Arturo Toscanini. Cavaradossi in Paris with a team of the Vienna Staatsoper. Cavaradossi in Warsaw and Poznań. Concerts in Kraków, Warsaw and Poznań.
- 1929: performances in Budapest (Calaf), Rio de Janeiro, Buenos Aires (Cavaradossi, the Duke of Mantua, Alfredo in La Traviata), Montevideo, Frankfurt. Cavaradossi, the Duke of Mantua, Rodolfo (La Bohème Puccini) and a concert in Warsaw.
- 1930: The throat disease reduces for some time his performances at opera houses. Film career, becoming one of the first European cinema idols sound. The film The Singing City (Die singende Stadt) (London). Cavaradossi in.
- 1931: Knight des Grieux in Manon Massenet's La Scala in Milan. He sang in Hamburg and Chicago. Cavaradossi in Warsaw. Concerts in Warsaw, Poznań and Lwów.
- 1932: the movie The Song of Night (Berlin), concerts in Warsaw and Poznań.
- 1933: The film I need to get you (Berlin). Calaf in Warsaw. Opens Hotel Patria in Krynica.
- 1934: The movie My Song for You (London), Cavaradossi in Berlin, Warsaw Faust, Cavaradossi, Knight des Grieux and Rodolfo at the Paris Opera Comique, in Krynica concert for flood victims.
- 1935: Cavaradossi in Kraków, a concert in Berlin, the film I love all women (Ciné-Alliance for UFA), awarded the Polish Gold Cross of Merit and the Knight's Cross of the French Legion of Honour.
- 1936: Movies Love Song (USA) and sunshine (Vienna), married Oct 30 in Katowice, Martha Eggerth, a Hungarian actress and singer, has performed for the construction of the National Museum in Kraków, awarded the Officer's Cross, Order of Polonia Restituta and the Belgian Order of Leopold I.
- 1937: concerts in Kraków and Paris, the film The Charm of La Boheme (Vienna), Swedish Cross North, Warsaw Philharmonic concerts in the winter to help the poor population.
- 1938: Debut at New York's Metropolitan Opera (from February 10 to April 9 there occurred 13 times in the office and at the venue the band in Boston and Cleveland, he sang Rodolfo (4 times), Don José in Carmen by Bizet (4 times) Duke of Mantua (4 times) and participated in a concert gigs in Warsaw (Don José).
- 1939: from February 10 to April 10 there are 15 times at the Metropolitan Opera and the guest appearances of this syndrome in Boston, Cleveland, Dallas and Rochester, he sang Rodolfo (5 times), Chevalier des Grieux (5 times), Duke of Mantua (2 times) Cavaradossi (once) and participated in two concerts, summer concerts in Cieszyn, Poznań, Gdynia, and after World War II in Paris and France Polonia centers.
- 1940: Germans place him in the Lexikon der Juden in der Musik (Lexicon of Jewish musicians), he returned to America, giving concerts to Poles in Montreal (to 1944 associated with the Civic Opera of Chicago).
- 1942: the switch. February and March, again appeared with the New York Metropolitan Opera, singing there for only five: Don José Cavaradossi (2 times), Duke of Mantua's aria in a concert and a show lounge Rodolfo team in Philadelphia (in total for the years 1939–1942 he sang with MET 1922 Times in New York and 11 times during the performances in other cities).
- 1943: the movie My song for you (USA), he rented the Majestic Theater on Broadway, where he and his wife took part as Danilo in The Merry Widow Lehar who is extremely popular, he made the presentation to tour other U.S. cities And after the war, Britain, France, Italy and Germany, singing widow in four languages).
- 1946: exhibited at the Majestic Theater musical Polonaise Bronislaw Kapera the recitals of Chopin's music.
- 1948: he returned with his family to Europe and settled for six years in Paris, the new version of the movie The Charm of La Boheme (Rome).
- 1949: The film Valse brillante (Paris), performing with his wife in Czardas Princess on stage Kálmán Théâtre de Paris.
- 1952: the movie Land of Smiles (West Berlin), re-settled in America, buying property in Rye, New York, which did not interrupt his performances in Europe.
- 1954: The title role in Der Zarewitsch Lehar's Viennese Raimundtheater on stage.
- 1955: The Merry Widow: Palace Theatre, London London: produced by Henry Kendall, on behalf of Peter Daubeny
- 1956: title role in Paganini Lehar's Viennese Raimundtheater on stage.
- 1958: visited Poland twice, performed in Bydgoszcz, Gdańsk, Lódź, Katowice, Kraków, Poznań, Warsaw and Wrocław.
- 1959: re-sung in Poland, he returned to the role Danilo in the Merry Widow on stage in New York.
- 1960: concerts in West Berlin.
- 1965: Danilo in The Merry Widow in West Berlin.
- 1966: last appearance (August 13) in Port Chester for the Polish American community.

== Filmography ==
- The Unthinkable (1926, Polish)
- The Singing City (1930, German)
- City of Song (1931, British)
- The Song of Night (1932, German)
- Tell Me Tonight (1932, British)
- All for Love (1933, French)
- One Night's Song (1933, French)
- A Song for You (1933, German)
- My Heart Calls You (1934, German)
- My Heart Is Calling You (1934, French)
- My Song for You (1934, British)
- My Heart Is Calling (1935, British)
- I Love All the Women (1935, German)
- J'aime toutes les femmes (1935, French)
- Thank You, Madame (1936, Austrian)
- Give Us This Night (1936, American)
- The Charm of La Boheme (1937, Austrian)
- Das Abenteuer geht weiter (1939, German)
- Addio Mimí! (1949, Italian)
- Brilliant Waltz (1949, French)
- Unknown Sender (1950, German)
- The Land of Smiles (1952, German)

== See also ==
- Music of Poland
- List of Polish music artists
