= A Man with Heart =

1932 film directed by Géza von Bolváry

- Directed by: Géza von Bolváry
- Written by: Hans H. Zerlett
- Based on: A milliomos by Adorján Bónyi
- Produced by: Julius Haimann
- Starring: Gustav Fröhlich; Maria Matray; Gustav Waldau
- Cinematography: Willy Goldberger
- Music by: Robert Stolz
- Production company: Super-Film
- Distributed by: Bayerische Filmgesellschaft
- Release date: 26 November 1932
- Running time: 102 minutes
- Country: Germany
- Language: German

A Man with Heart (German: Ein Mann mit Herz) is a 1932 German comedy film directed by Géza von Bolváry and starring Gustav Fröhlich, Maria Matray, and Gustav Waldau. It was shot at the Emelka Studios in Munich. The film's sets were designed by the art directors Ludwig Reiber and Willy Reiber. It was remade as the 1935 Swedish film Under False Flag. The film is based on the play A milliomos by Adorján Bónyi.

== Synopsis ==
Bank clerk Paul Ritter falls in love with a young woman, without realising that she is the daughter of his boss. He is therefore jealous of their close relationship. The misunderstanding is cleared up when he manages to save the bank from being defrauded.

== Cast ==
- Gustav Fröhlich as Paul Ritter
- Maria Matray
- Gustav Waldau as Theodor Monti
- Paul Kemp as Rochus Sperling
- Georg Henrich as Direktor Haber
- Kurt Horwitz as Direktor Sieber
- Ali Ghito as Fräulein Kelter
- Erna Fentsch as Fräulein John
- Gina Falckenberg as Fräulein Kleinschmidt
- Max Weydner
- Hans Schlenck
- Beppo Benz
- Max Schreck

== Bibliography ==
- Grange, William (2008). Cultural Chronicle of the Weimar Republic. Lanham, MD: Scarecrow Press. ISBN 978-0-8108-5967-8.
- Klaus, Ulrich J. Deutsche Tonfilme: Jahrgang 1932. Klaus-Archiv, 1988.
