= Franz Planer =

Austrian-American cinematographer (1894–1963)

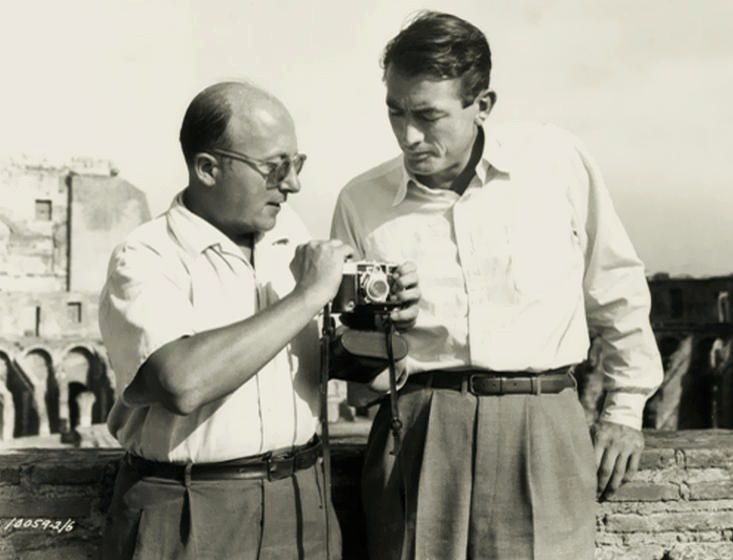
Frank Planer and Gregory Peck in Roman Holiday (1953)

Franz Planer, A.S.C. (29 March 1894 – 10 January 1963) was an Austrian-American cinematographer, later naturalized in the United States.

== Life ==
Planer was born on 29 March 1894 in Chomutov, Bohemia, Austria-Hungary, but his family came from Ústí nad Labem. He studied photography in Vienna in the 1910s and started to work there as cinematographer. He then moved to Germany and shot his first film Storms in May there in 1919. In 1923, he married a Jewish woman in Církvice in Czechoslovakia.

When the Nazis came to power, he decided to move from Germany to Austria and then to Great Britain. Because of his Jewish wife, he left Europe in 1937 and moved to the United States. He decided to change his name to Frank Planer, this time officially and permanently.

He shot over 130 movies in Hollywood, including Letter from an Unknown Woman (1948), The Big Country (1958) and Breakfast at Tiffany's (1961).

== Partial filmography ==
- Storms in May (1920)
- The War of the Oxen (1920)
- The Monastery's Hunter (1920)
- The Fountain of Madness (1921)
- Night of the Burglar (1921)
- The Drums of Asia (1921)
- Monna Vanna (1922)
- The Favourite of the Queen (1922)
- Trutzi from Trutzberg (1922)
- Destiny (1925)
- Love's Finale (1925)
- Darling, Count the Cash (1926)
- Her Husband's Wife (1926)
- Tea Time in the Ackerstrasse (1926)
- Only a Dancing Girl (1926)
- The Son of Hannibal (1926)
- How Do I Marry the Boss? (1927)
- The Eighteen Year Old (1927)
- Queen of the Boulevards (1927)
- The Bordello in Rio (1927)
- Break-in (1927)
- Volga Volga (1928)
- The Duty to Remain Silent (1928)
- Strauss Is Playing Today (1928)
- The Green Alley (1928)
- Women on the Edge (1929)
- The Love of the Brothers Rott (1929)
- Hans in Every Street (1930)
- Retreat on the Rhine (1930)
- Helene Willfüer, Student of Chemistry (1930)
- The Road to Paradise (1930)
- The Son of the White Mountain (1930)
- Calais-Dover (1931)
- The Office Manager (1931)
- No More Love (1931)
- The Prince of Arcadia (1932)
- The First Right of the Child (1932)
- The Countess of Monte Cristo (1932)
- The Black Hussar (1932)
- Sailor's Song (1932)
- Gently My Songs Entreat (1933)
- Her Highness the Saleswoman (1933)
- A City Upside Down (1933)
- The Hymn of Leuthen (1933)
- Unfinished Symphony (1934)
- Maskerade (1934)
- Moscow Nights (1934)
- So Ended a Great Love (1934)
- The Princess's Whim (1934)
- The Typist Gets Married (1934)
- Turn of the Tide (1935)
- The Divine Spark (1935)
- Thank You, Madame (1936)
- The Beloved Vagabond (1936)
- Harvest (1936)
- Flowers from Nice (1936)
- Such Great Foolishness (1937)
- Capers (1937)
- The Charm of La Boheme (1937)
- Premiere (1937)
- Holiday (1938)
- Glamour for Sale (1940)
- The Face Behind the Mask (1941)
- Our Wife (1941)
- Daring Young Man (1942)
- Appointment in Berlin (1943)
- My Kingdom for a Cook (1943)
- Secret Command (1944)
- I Love a Bandleader (1945)
- Her Sister's Secret (1946)
- The Chase (1946)
- One Touch of Venus (1948)
- Letter from an Unknown Woman (1948)
- Champion (1949)
- Criss Cross (1949)
- Illegal Entry (1949)
- Take One False Step (1949)
- Cyrano de Bergerac (1950)
- The Blue Veil (1951)
- The 5,000 Fingers of Dr. T. (1953)
- The Caine Mutiny (1954)
- 20,000 Leagues Under the Sea (1954)
- Not as a Stranger (1955)
- The Pride and the Passion (1957)
- The Big Country (1958)
- King of Kings (1961)
- Breakfast at Tiffany's (1961)
- The Children's Hour (1961)
- Something's Got to Give (1962, unfinished, restarted a year later as Move Over, Darling, with a different cast and technical staff)

== Academy Award Nominations ==
- Nominated for Cinematography (Black & White) 1949: Champion
- Nominated for Cinematography (Black & White) 1951: Death of a Salesman
- Nominated for Cinematography (Black & White) 1953: Roman Holiday
- Nominated for Cinematography (Color) 1959: The Nun's Story
- Nominated for Cinematography (Black & White) 1961: The Children's Hour

== See also ==
- List of German-speaking Academy Award winners and nominees
