= The Charm of La Boheme =

1937 film directed by Géza von Bolváry

The Charm of La Bohème
- German film poster
- German: Zauber der Boheme
- Directed by: Géza von Bolváry
- Written by: Henri Murger (novel); Ernst Marischka; Alfred Gerasch
- Produced by: William A. Szekeley
- Starring: Jan Kiepura; Mártha Eggerth; Paul Kemp
- Cinematography: Franz Planer
- Edited by: Hermann Haller
- Music by: Robert Stolz
- Production company: Standard-Film
- Distributed by: Tobis-Sascha Film
- Release date: 7 October 1937
- Running time: 102 minutes
- Country: Austria
- Language: German

The Charm of La Bohème (German: Zauber der Boheme) is a 1937 Austrian musical film directed by Géza von Bolváry and starring Jan Kiepura, Mártha Eggerth, and Paul Kemp. It follows the plot of Giacomo Puccini's 1896 opera La bohème. The film's sets were designed by Hans Ledersteger. The Berlin premiere took place at the Ufa-Palast am Zoo.

== Cast ==
- Jan Kiepura as René Lambertin
- Mártha Eggerth as Denise
- Paul Kemp as Pierre Casale
- Theo Lingen as Aristide Boupon
- Oskar Sima as André Dupre
- Richard Romanowsky as Professor Delumat
- Lizzi Holzschuh as Lolotte Diridon
- Alfred Gerasch as Francois Vernier
- Karl Günther as Octave de Croisson
- Fritz Imhoff as Didier Blancheron
- Mimi Shorp as Anita
- Karl Skraup as Biscot
- Louise Kartousch as Frau Barbouche
- Hans Brand as Theaterarzt
- Ray Neudörffer as Director of the Opera
- Robert Valberg as Charles Fouqué, Operndirektor
- Karl Ehmann as Arzt von Denise
