= Anatole Litvak =

Ukrainian-American filmmaker (1902–1974)

Anatole Litvak OBE
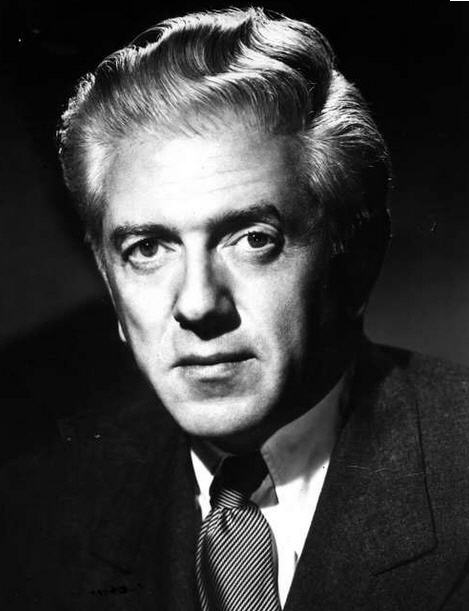
- Born: Anatoly Moishevich Litvak; June 3, 1902; Kiev, Russian Empire (now Kyiv, Ukraine)
- Died: December 15, 1974 (aged 72); Neuilly-sur-Seine, France
- Citizenship: United States (after 1940)
- Occupations: Film director; producer; screenwriter
- Years active: 1930–1970
- Notable work: Mayerling; Why We Fight; The Battle of Russia; City for Conquest; The Snake Pit
- Spouse(s): Miriam Hopkins (m. 1937; div. 1939) Sophie Steur (m. 1955)
- Awards: Legion of Honour and Croix de guerre, (France); Order of the British Empire, honorary officer; United States Legion of Merit, Bronze Star Medal
- Military career
- Allegiance: United States
- Branch: United States Army
- Service years: 1940–1947
- Rank: Colonel
- Unit: Army Signal Corps
- Conflicts: World War II; European Theater of Operations; Operation Overlord

Anatoly Mikhailovich Litvak (Note: Russian: Анатолий Михайлович Литвак Ukrainian: Анатолій Михайлович Літвак Hebrew: אנטול ליטבק) OBE (June 3, 1902 – December 15, 1974), commonly known as Anatole Litvak, was a Ukrainian and American filmmaker. Born to Jewish parents in Kiev, then in the Russian Empire, he began his theatrical training at age 13 in Saint Petersburg, where he lived through the end of the Russian Revolution. He began his film directing career in Germany and France, before moving to the United States in the late 1930s.

Litvak was notable for directing little-known foreign actors to early fame and is believed to have contributed to several actors winning Academy Awards. In 1936 he directed Mayerling, a film which made French actors Charles Boyer and Danielle Darrieux international stars. He returned Swedish star Ingrid Bergman to popularity with American audiences in 1956 with Anastasia, in which she won her second Oscar. He directed Olivia de Havilland to an Academy Award nomination for The Snake Pit (1948). He directed Jean Gabin in his screen debut and directed Elia Kazan in his earliest acting role, City for Conquest.

Litvak directed Confessions of a Nazi Spy in 1939, starring Edward G. Robinson, which used actual newsreel footage from U.S. Nazi rallies. As a refugee from Nazi Germany, Litvak was among the few directors who tried to open Hollywood's eyes to the threat Germany posed to Europe and the world.

During World War II, he enlisted and co-directed documentaries with Frank Capra, including Why We Fight films. On his own he directed The Battle of Russia (1943), which won numerous awards and was nominated for an Oscar. Because of Litvak's fluency in multiple languages, he supervised the filming of the D-Day Normandy landings. He also filmed aerial warfare with the U.S. Eighth Air Force. He was promoted to full colonel by the end of the war for his volunteer wartime efforts. He received special awards from the governments of France, Britain, and the United States.

== Early years ==
Anatoly Mikhailovich Litvak was born in Kiev to a Jewish family that had originated from Lithuania (his surname means "Lithuanian" in Yiddish). The family moved to Saint Petersburg, the capital of the Russian Empire, when Litvak was still a child. As a teenager, he worked at a theater and took acting lessons at the state drama school, and later graduated from the Saint Petersburg State University.

Litvak remained there through the Russian Revolution, and began his filmmaking career at Nordkino Studios, where he was assistant director and a production designer for nine silent films during the 1920s. For political and ideological reasons, and especially because Russian theaters were nationalized by the Soviet government in the 1920s, he left Russia for Berlin, Germany in 1925. There he would have more artistic possibilities.

== Director in Europe ==
=== Germany ===
Litvak's first film as director was the musical Dolly Gets Ahead (1930) with Dolly Haas. He followed it with two Lilian Harvey films, No More Love (1931) and Calais-Dover (1931).

He directed Lilac (1932) in France. He returned to Germany for The Song of Night (1932), shot at the same time as an English version, released as Tell Me Tonight (1932). He went to England to direct Sleeping Car (1933), starring Ivor Novello.

=== France ===
Following Adolf Hitler's rise to power with the Nazi Party in 1933, Litvak moved to France. Paris became his favored locale for shooting films. Thirteen of his thirty-seven films were set there.

He made The Old Devil (1933) and The Crew (1935).

According to film historian Ronald Bowers, Litvak became skilled in using location shooting and realistic documentary effects as early as the 1930s. He also became known in the industry for emphasizing sound effects over dialogue in sound films. He preferred to keep the camera running with tracking shots and pans. Given his preference for achieving motion in camerawork, he often used crane shots and sat with the cameraman to be sure he was getting what he wanted.

==== Mayerling ====
Mayerling (1936), which starred French actors Charles Boyer and Danielle Darrieux, is credited with establishing Litvak's international reputation as a producer and director. Critics widely praised the film; some reviewers called it "one of the most compelling love stories the cinema has produced," and "a romantic tragedy of the highest order." American writer Lincoln Kirstein claimed the film became "a kind of standard for the romantic film in a historical setting." In describing Litvak's cinematography style in the film, critic Jack Edmund Nolan writes that it is "replete with the camera trackings, pans, and swoops, techniques which later became the trademark of Max Ophuls."

== Hollywood and World War II ==
=== Warner Bros ===
The worldwide success of Mayerling brought Litvak invitations from Hollywood; he was offered a four-year contract by Warner Brothers. After accepting the contract, Litvak became one of Hollywood's leading directors by the late 1930s. He was lucky to have left France before it fell to the Nazi invasion and occupation.

He directed the films The Woman I Love (1937); Tovarich (1937) with Boyer, a comedy celebrating "outmoded values of the ruined Russian aristocracy"; The Amazing Dr. Clitterhouse (1938); and The Sisters (1938), starring Bette Davis and Errol Flynn.

"Anatole Litvak was an inspiring help.... I like his severity. It keeps you on your toes."

— actor Tyrone Power

Also with Warner Brothers, he directed Confessions of a Nazi Spy, a 1939 film starring Edward G. Robinson as an FBI agent who breaks up a Nazi spy ring. It was released at a time of increasing tensions in Europe as the Nazis promoted their expansion. Among the techniques he used in the film to achieve realism was the inclusion of newsreel footage from U.S. Nazi rallies. While the story was fictional, the espionage methods that it revealed were considered factual. The film was described as the "strongest and most thrilling dramatic movie" that had ever been put on screen. The film was banned in Germany, and by its Fascist allies Italy and Spain. Neutral countries such as Switzerland and Ireland also banned it. The producers hoped to arouse concern in the United States, where many people wanted to pursue isolation and escape any "European war."

Biographer Alexander Walker said in his book about Vivien Leigh, that Litvak tried to open Hollywood's eyes to the threat Germany posed to Europe and the world. Leigh, who later starred in Litvak's The Deep Blue Sea (1955), recalls her Sunday morning visits to Litvak and his wife, Miriam Hopkins. She learned from him that the studios were trying to protect their investments in the German box office and did not want to produce films that would offend that country. Hollywood's "comfortable isolationism affronted her."

After Castle on the Hudson (1940), Litvak produced and directed All This and Heaven Too, starring Bette Davis and Charles Boyer. The film was nominated for an Academy Award as Best Picture.

That same year he co-produced and directed City for Conquest, starring James Cagney and supporting actor Elia Kazan. This was one of Kazan's few film roles before he became a leading director. The Hollywood Reporter gave Litvak's directing special praise:

The work of Anatole Litvak is the outstanding credit. He seems to have topped every other effort in his direction of each sequence of this picture. His fight scenes are terrific; his love scenes give you creeps of joy; his pacing of the yarn, because it told so much, was perfection... Litvak is definitely at the top of the heap with this contribution. It was no easy task.

He directed two films released the same year: Out of the Fog (1941) and Blues in the Night (1941). 20th Century Fox borrowed him under contract to direct This Above All (1942).

=== World War II and Why We Fight ===
Litvak, having by then become an American citizen, enlisted in the United States Army at the beginning of US involvement in World War II. During the war, when he directed training and other films, and documentaries about the war, he was promoted to lieutenant colonel. He joined with fellow director Frank Capra to make the Why We Fight war training film series, most of which included newsreel footage.

Films they co-directed for the series included Prelude to War (1942), The Nazis Strike (1943), Divide and Conquer (1943), The Battle of China (1944) and War Comes to America (1945). Capra was in charge of production for all the films.

Litvak became involved with helping the Soviet Union in August 1941, soon after it was invaded by Nazi Germany. He was treasurer of the Russian War Relief Association, which sponsored international radio benefits with stars such as Edward G. Robinson and Ronald Colman.

Litvak co-produced and alone directed The Battle of Russia in 1943. After the film was released, he was sent to Russia on a special mission, in which he held a private screening for the Russian General Staff. The theme of the film was to show the heroic manner that the Russian people fought against the Nazis. U.S. ambassador to Russia W. Averell Harriman asked Litvak to narrate the English-language film in Russian during the screening.

Litvak recalled:

Afterward, the Russian generals came up to me, very friendly, and asked me how I had learned to speak Russian so fluently... I explained that I was born in Russia, but had left there when I was twenty-two and now I was an American citizen.

Litvak was decorated by Soviet leader Joseph Stalin for his work on this film. It was shown in theaters throughout Russia. During his trip to Russia, Litvak briefly reunited with his mother in Leningrad; they had not seen each other for nearly 20 years. After the film's excellent reception in the U.S., it won the New York Film Critics Award as Best Documentary.

He later directed War Comes to America (1945), the final film in the Why We Fight series. The films were scripted by Anthony Veiller and narrated by Walter Huston, with music by Dimitri Tiomkin, another Russian-born émigré to Hollywood. Prelude to War won the Oscar for Best Documentary of 1942. Because of Litvak's ability to speak Russian, German, and French, he subsequently supervised the filming of the D-Day Normandy landings. He also filmed aerial warfare with the U.S. Eighth Air Force.

Because Litvak joined the army to help Capra produce the film series, the director said he was one of the "Hollywood knights" who came to America's "rescue," and without whose help "no one could have made the Why We Fight films."

Ending the war as a full colonel, Litvak received special awards from the governments of France, Britain, and the United States for his work. The French government awarded him the Legion of Honour and the Croix de Guerre. The British government awarded him with a gold medal, ribbon, and citation as an honorary officer of the Order of the British Empire. By an order from Winston Churchill, all the films in the Why We Fight series were to be shown in all public theaters throughout Britain. From the U.S., he received the United States Legion of Merit and a Bronze Star Medal.

== Post-war films ==
=== Hollywood ===
At the end of the war, Litvak returned to filmmaking with The Long Night (1947), a flop thriller at RKO.

He directed Barbara Stanwyck and Burt Lancaster in Sorry, Wrong Number, a role which film historian James Robert Parish states is Stanwyck's "greatest screen triumph." Litvak directed using a "variety of surrealistic and expressionistic devices," notes Film Noir magazine. "Litvak isn't afraid to use close-ups either. And his players not only stand up to this relentless probing but offer some of the greatest performances of their lives.". Stanwyck was nominated for the best actress academy award.

Litvak was nominated in 1948 for a Best Director Oscar for The Snake Pit (1948), starring Olivia de Havilland. The film was nominated for Best Actress, Best Screenplay, and Best Musical Score. To prepare de Havilland for her role as a mental patient, she and Litvak spent months observing actual patients at mental hospitals. Litvak had purchased the pre-publication rights to the story which is based on a fictionalized autobiography.

This is the finest picture I have seen this year, and I nominate it for an Academy Award.

— General Douglas MacArthur,
upon seeing Decision Before Dawn

=== Europe ===
In the 1950s, Litvak began filming in Europe.

In 1951, his war film Decision Before Dawn filmed on location in Germany was nominated for an Academy Award for Best Picture. Thousands of French admirers of the film signed a huge scroll which they sent to AMPAS, insisting that the film be given an Oscar. It was Oskar Werner's first acting role in an American film.

Among his productions, there was Act of Love (1953) with Kirk Douglas filmed in Paris, and The Deep Blue Sea (1955) with Vivien Leigh and Kenneth More shot in England.

He directed Anastasia, filmed in Paris in 1956, starring Ingrid Bergman, Yul Brynner and Helen Hayes. The film was Bergman's first U.S. film after a seven-year absence from Hollywood, which she left after her scandalous affair with director Roberto Rossellini became news. Twentieth Century Fox conducted a poll and found that the public still had negative feelings toward Bergman. Litvak, however, felt she would be an excellent actress for the part and insisted on her starring in the film. Bergman won an Oscar for Best Actress for her part, and film critic Michael Barson calls it Litvak's best film of the 1950s.

Litvak directed Mayerling (1957) for television with Audrey Hepburn, then The Journey (1959) with Yul Brynner, which was filmed in Austria.

At the 1961 Cannes Film Festival, Litvak's Goodbye Again (also starring Ingrid Bergman) was nominated for the Palme d'Or. It starred Anthony Perkins who was reunited with Litvak in Five Miles to Midnight (1962) with both films shot in Paris. He produced, but did not direct, Jules Dassin's 10:30 P.M. Summer (1966).

Litvak filmed The Night of the Generals (1967) in France, Germany, and Poland; a movie about three Nazi Generals suspected of murder, starring Peter O'Toole and Omar Sharif. Litvak said about the film's subdued tones: "We tried staying away from color as much as we could; color can be bad, particularly with the war; it takes away from reality in the most horrible way."

His last film was The Lady in the Car with Glasses and a Gun (1970), a thriller set in the South of France, based on a Sébastien Japrisot novel of the same name.

== Personal life ==
In 1937, Litvak became the third husband of American actress Miriam Hopkins; their marriage ended in divorce in 1939. His second marriage was in 1955 to the model Sophie Steur. They remained married until his death.

Litvak was a polyglot, fluent in Yiddish, Ukrainian, Russian, English, German, and French.

=== Death ===
Litvak died at the age of 72 on 15 December 1974, at a hospital in the Parisian suburb of Neuilly-sur-Seine.

== Legacy ==
For his contribution to the motion picture industry, Litvak received a star on the Hollywood Walk of Fame at 6633 Hollywood Blvd on February 8, 1960.

== Filmography ==
Year	Title	Functioned as			Notes
Year	Title	Director	Writer	Producer	Notes
1930	Dolly Gets Ahead	Yes	No	No	
1931	No More Love	Yes	Yes	No	
1931	Calais-Dover	Yes	Yes	No	French-language version of No More Love; Co-directed with Jean Boyer
1932	The Song of Night	Yes	No	No	
1932	Tell Me Tonight	Yes	No	No	English-langauge version of The Song of Night
1932	Lilac	Yes	Yes	No	
1933	The Old Devil	Yes	Yes	No	
1933	One Night's Song	Yes	No	No	French-language version of The Song of Night; Co-directed with Pierre Colombier
1933	Sleeping Car	Yes	Story	No	
1935	The Crew	Yes	Yes	No	
1936	Mayerling	Yes	No	No	
1937	The Woman I Love	Yes	No	No	First American film
1937	Tovarich	Yes	No	Yes	
1938	The Sisters	Yes	No	Yes	
1938	The Amazing Dr. Clitterhouse	Yes	No	No	
1939	Confessions of a Nazi Spy	Yes	No	No	
1940	Castle on the Hudson	Yes	No	Yes	
1940	City for Conquest	Yes	No	Yes	
1940	All This and Heaven Too	Yes	No	No	
1941	Out of the Fog	Yes	No	No	
1941	Blues in the Night	Yes	No	No	
1942	This Above All	Yes	No	No	
1943	The Battle of Russia	Yes	Yes	No	Documentary; Co-directed with Frank Capra
1944	The Battle of China	Yes	Yes	Yes	Documentary; Co-directed with Frank Capra
1945	War Comes to America	Yes	Yes	No	Documentary; Co-directed with Frank Capra
1947	The Long Night	Yes	No	Yes	
1948	Sorry, Wrong Number	Yes	No	Yes	
1948	The Snake Pit	Yes	No	Yes	
1951	Decision Before Dawn	Yes	No	Yes	
1953	Act of Love	Yes	No	Yes	
1955	The Deep Blue Sea	Yes	No	No	
1956	Anastasia	Yes	No	No	
1957	Mayerling	Yes	No	No	
1959	The Journey	Yes	No	Yes	
1961	Goodbye Again	Yes	No	Yes	
1962	Five Miles to Midnight	Yes	No	Yes	
1967	The Night of the Generals	Yes	No	Yes	
1970	The Lady in the Car with Glasses and a Gun	Yes	Yes	Yes	

==== Producer only ====
- Prelude to War (1942, documentary)
- 10:30 P.M. Summer (1966)

== Awards and nominations ==
Institution	Year	Category	Work	Result
Academy Awards	1949	Best Director	The Snake Pit	Nominated
Academy Awards	1952	Best Picture	Decision Before Dawn	Nominated
Bodil Awards	1950	Best English Language Film	The Snake Pit	Won
Cannes Film Festival	1961	Palme d'Or	Goodbye Again	Nominated
Directors Guild of America	1949	Outstanding Directorial Achievement in Theatrical Feature Film	The Snake Pit	Nominated
Directors Guild of America	1952	Outstanding Directorial Achievement in Theatrical Feature Film	Decision Before Dawn	Nominated
Mar del Plata International Film Festival	1959	Best Film (International Competition)	The Journey	Nominated
Venice Film Festival	1932	Audience Award	The Song of Night	Nominated
Venice Film Festival	1936	Best Foreign Film	Mayerling	Nominated
Venice Film Festival	1949	Golden Lion	The Snake Pit	Won
Venice Film Festival	1949	International Award	The Snake Pit	Nominated
Venice Film Festival	1955	Golden Lion	The Deep Blue Sea	Nominated
