= Fritz Klotzsch =

German film producer and production manager

- Born: 16 May 1896; Berlin, German Empire
- Died: 9 January 1971 (aged 74); Berlin, West Germany
- Other name: Fritz Klotsch
- Occupation: Producer
- Years active: 1921-1968 (film)

Fritz Klotzsch (16 May 1896 – 9 January 1971) was a German film producer and production manager. He was head of production at Bavaria Film for two years.

== Selected filmography ==
- All for Love (1933)
- Her Highness the Saleswoman (1933)
- So Ended a Great Love (1934)
- I Love All the Women (1935)
- Tomfoolery (1936)
- The Broken Jug (1937)
- The Muzzle (1938)
- People in the Storm (1941)
- Die Entlassung (1942)
- My Wife Theresa (1942)
- An Old Heart Becomes Young Again (1943)
- The Court Concert (1948)
- The Divorcée (1953)
- Marili (1959)
- The Hunchback of Soho (1966)
- Dr. Fabian: Laughing Is the Best Medicine (1969)
- The Man with the Glass Eye (1969)

== Bibliography ==
- Giesen, Rolf. Nazi Propaganda Films: A History and Filmography. McFarland, 2003.
