= Kurt Herlth =

German art director (1896–1966)

- Born: 24 February 1896; Wriezen, Brandenburg, German Empire
- Died: 17 July 1966 (aged 70); Berlin, Germany
- Other name: Kurt Otto Albert Herlth
- Occupation: Art director
- Years active: 1934-1963 (film)

Kurt Herlth (1896–1966) was a German art director known for his designs of film sets. His brother Robert Herlth was also an art director active in the German film industry, and the two men worked together a number of times.

== Selected filmography ==
- My Heart Calls You (1934)
- My Heart Is Calling You (1934)
- Victoria (1935)
- The Emperor's Candlesticks (1936)
- Court Theatre (1936)
- Capers (1937)
- Ride to Freedom (1937)
- Serenade (1937)
- The Girl with a Good Reputation (1938)
- A Mother's Love (1939)
- I Am Sebastian Ott (1939)
- Thrice Wed (1941)
- Andreas Schlüter (1942)
- Destiny (1942)
- Melusine (1944)
- Marriage in the Shadows (1947)
- No Place for Love (1947)
- The Adventures of Fridolin (1948)
- Artists' Blood (1949)
- Don't Dream, Annette (1949)
- The Murder Trial of Doctor Jordan (1949)
- The Merry Wives of Windsor (1950)
- It Began at Midnight (1951)
- The White Horse Inn (1952)
- The Sergeant's Daughter (1952)
- The Empress of China (1953)
- Hit Parade (1953)
- As Long as There Are Pretty Girls (1955)
- Regine (1956)
- And Lead Us Not Into Temptation (1957)

== Bibliography ==
- Bock, Hans-Michael & Bergfelder, Tim. The Concise CineGraph. Encyclopedia of German Cinema. Berghahn Books, 2009.
