= Werner Schlichting =

German art director (1904–1996)

- Born: 27 June 1904; Berlin, German Empire
- Died: 8 March 1996 (aged 91); Oberalm, Austria
- Occupation: Art Director
- Years active: 1928 - 1971 (film)

Werner Schlichting (1904–1996) was a German art director who worked on over a hundred films during a lengthy career. He worked on a number of Austrian films including The Congress Dances and The Last Ten Days (1955).

== Selected filmography ==
- Luther (1928)
- The Flame of Love (1930)
- Calais-Dover (1931)
- No More Love (1931)
- Two Hearts Beat as One (1932)
- The Song of Night (1932)
- How Shall I Tell My Husband? (1932)
- All for Love (1933)
- What Men Know (1933)
- Her Highness the Saleswoman (1933)
- A Song for You (1933)
- My Heart Calls You (1934)
- So Ended a Great Love (1934)
- The Princess's Whim (1934)
- My Heart Is Calling You (1934)
- Victoria (1935)
- Artist Love (1935)
- Casta Diva (1935)
- The Emperor's Candlesticks (1936)
- Court Theatre (1936)
- Serenade (1937)
- Capers (1937)
- The Girl with a Good Reputation (1938)
- A Mother's Love (1939)
- Bel Ami (1939)
- Thrice Wed (1941)
- Destiny (1942)
- The Secret Countess (1942)
- Late Love (1943)
- Archduke Johann's Great Love (1950)
- Bonus on Death (1950)
- Maria Theresa (1951)
- Heidi (1952)
- The Venus of Tivoli (1953)
- Fireworks (1954)
- Walking Back into the Past (1954)
- Cabaret (1954)
- The Congress Dances (1955)
- The Last Ten Days (1955)
- Mozart (1955)
- Crown Prince Rudolph's Last Love (1956)
- The Saint and Her Fool (1957)
- The Unexcused Hour (1957)
- The Priest and the Girl (1958)
- Arena of Fear (1959)
- Jacqueline (1959)
- Via Mala (1961)
- Captain Sindbad (1963)
- Honour Among Thieves (1966)
- Long Legs, Long Fingers (1966)
- Morning's at Seven (1968)
- When Sweet Moonlight Is Sleeping in the Hills (1969)

== Bibliography ==
- Fritsche, Maria. Homemade Men in Postwar Austrian Cinema: Nationhood, Genre and Masculinity. Berghahn Books, 2013.
