= Tell Me Tonight =

1932 film

- Directed by: Anatole Litvak
- Written by: Albrecht Joseph; Henri-Georges Clouzot; J.O.C. Orton; Irma von Cube
- Produced by: Hermann Fellner; Arnold Pressburger; Gregor Rabinovitch; Josef Somlo
- Starring: Jan Kiepura; Sonnie Hale; Magda Schneider
- Cinematography: Willy Goldberger; Fritz Arno Wagner
- Production companies: Cine-Allianz Tonfilm; Gainsborough Pictures
- Distributed by: Woolf and Freedman
- Release date: 31 October 1932
- Running time: 91 minutes
- Country: United Kingdom
- Language: English

Tell Me Tonight or Be Mine Tonight is a 1932 British musical comedy film directed by Anatole Litvak and starring Jan Kiepura, Sonnie Hale and Magda Schneider. It was shot in Berlin at the Babelsberg Studios as part of a co-production between Gainsborough Pictures and the German firm Cine-Allianz. A separate German-language version The Song of Night was also released.

== Cast ==
- Jan Kiepura as Enrico Ferraro
- Sonnie Hale as Alexander Koretsky
- Magda Schneider as Mathilde Pategg
- Edmund Gwenn as Mayor Pategg
- Athene Seyler as Mrs. Pategg
- Betty Chester as Miss Barker
- Aubrey Mather as Balthasar

== Bibliography ==
- Creekmur, Corey & Mokdad, Linda. The International Film Musical. Edinburgh University Press, 2012.
- Wood, Linda. British Films, 1927-1939. British Film Institute, 1986.
