= Gregor Rabinovitch =

Ukrainian-born film producer (1889-1953)

- Born: 2 April 1889; Kyiv
- Died: 12 November 1953 (aged 64); Munich
- Occupation: Film producer, production manager

Gregor Rabinovitch (Russian: Григо́рий Алекса́ндрович Рабино́вич; 2 April 1889 – 12 November 1953) was a Ukrainian-born film producer who worked for many years in the German film industry. He emigrated to France from the Soviet Union in the early 1920s. After working for a time in Germany, he left following the Nazi takeover of power in 1933, and spent a number of years in France and the United States. He later returned and died in Munich in 1953.

In 1932 he set up the production company Cine-Allianz with Arnold Pressburger. The company enjoyed commercial success, but was subsequently expropriated from them by the Nazi government of Germany as part of the anti-Jewish policy.

Under pressure from the Reich Film Chamber, Cine-Allianz Tonfilm GmbH was converted into a liquidation company in 1935. Expropriation followed on July 24, 1937. Rabinowitsch left Germany and worked mainly in Paris, where his old company Ciné-Alliance had already resumed work in 1934. Although Rabinowitsch was able to produce Robert Z. Leonard's romantic film Maytime for MGM in 1937, his efforts to establish a lasting partnership with American production companies, especially United Artists, were unsuccessful.

A legal dispute initiated by Gregor Rabinowitsch in 1950 in the Federal Republic of Germany over Cine-Allianz Tonfilm GmbH, which had been lost through expropriation, led to the retransfer of ownership and exploitation rights. As financial compensation, he received 500,000 Reichsmark from the assets of Felix Pfitzner, the managing director of the 'aryanized' Cine-Allianz. Two years later, he founded a production company with the same name in Munich, which was only able to produce a single film before Rabinowitsch's death (Die geschiedene Frau, directed by Georg Jacoby, with Marika Rökk and Johannes Heesters, 1953). In 1979, the claim of the heirs (Helene Rabinowitsch, Fred Pressburger and Nelly Mandel) for higher compensation was dismissed because both owners of the Cine-Allianz had agreed to the settlement of November 23, 1950 and it was therefore legally binding.

== Selected filmography ==
- Heart of an Actress (1924)
- Prince Charming (1925)
- Michel Strogoff (1926)
- 600,000 Francs a Month (1926)
- The Loves of Casanova (1927)
- Muche (1927)
- Looping the Loop (1928)
- Hurrah! I Live! (1928)
- Secrets of the Orient (1928)
- The Wonderful Lies of Nina Petrovna (1929)
- Dolly Gets Ahead (1930)
- The White Devil (1930)
- Calais-Dover (1931)
- In the Employ of the Secret Service (1931)
- No More Love (1931)
- Lumpenkavaliere (1932)
- Tell Me Tonight (1932)
- The Song of Night (1932)
- The Countess of Monte Cristo (1932)
- All for Love (1933)
- Gently My Songs Entreat (1933)
- A Song for You (1933)
- Spies at Work (1933)
- One Night's Song (1933)
- Her Highness the Saleswoman (1933)
- My Heart Calls You (1934)
- So Ended a Great Love (1934)
- The Blonde Carmen (1935)
- I Love All the Women (1935)
- Gibraltar (1938)
- Port of Shadows (1938)
- I Was an Adventuress (1938)
- There's No Tomorrow (1939)
- Night in December (1940)
- Beating Heart (1940)
- Three Russian Girls (1943)
- The Lady of the Camellias (1947)
- The Legend of Faust (1949)
- Aida (1953)
- The Divorcée (1953)
