= Arnold Pressburger =

Austrian film producer (1885-1951)

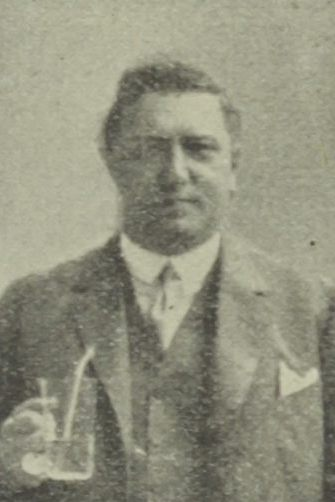
- Born: 27 August 1885; Pressburg, Austria-Hungary (now Bratislava, Slovakia)
- Died: 17 February 1951 (aged 65); Hamburg, Germany
- Occupation: Film producer
- Years active: 1913-1951
- Children: Fred Pressburger (1915-1998)

Arnold Pressburger (27 August 1885 – 17 February 1951) was an Austrian Jewish film producer who produced more than 70 films between 1913 and 1951. Pressburger was born in Pressburg, Austria-Hungary (now Bratislava, Slovakia) and died in Hamburg, Germany from a stroke.

In 1932, he set up the production company Cine-Allianz with Gregor Rabinovitch. The company enjoyed commercial success, but was subsequently expropriated from them by the Nazi government of Germany as part of the anti-Jewish policy. He was not related to the Hungarian British filmmaker Emeric Pressburger.

He fled to England, and then to the U.S.A., via France. He produced movies in both France and the UK. He arrived in Hollywood in 1941. There, he founded 'Arnold Pressburger Films', a banner under which he was able to release more films.

He was the father of Fred Pressburger, also in the film business.

Arnold died at the age of 65, while the shooting of his last-produced film, 'Der Verlorene' was underway.

== Partial filmography ==
- Martyr of His Heart (1918)
- The Other I (1918)
- Gypsy Love (1922)
- Masters of the Sea (1922)
- Children of the Revolution (1923)
- Young Medardus (1923)
- Miss Madame (1923)
- Avalanche (1923)
- Nameless (1923)
- Moon of Israel (1924)
- The Revenge of the Pharaohs (1925)
- One Does Not Play with Love (1926)
- Unmarried Daughters (1926)
- The Famous Woman (1927)
- Ghost Train (1927)
- Odette (1928)
- The Wrecker (1929)
- Land Without Women (1929)
- Three Days Confined to Barracks (1930)
- The Singing City (1930)
- Twice Married (1930)
- Dolly Gets Ahead (1930)
- The Virtuous Sinner (1931)
- My Cousin from Warsaw (1931)
- Calais-Dover (1931)
- No More Love (1931)
- Danton (1931)
- City of Song (1931)
- In the Employ of the Secret Service (1931)
- Berlin-Alexanderplatz (1931)
- No Money Needed (1932)
- Tell Me Tonight (1932)
- The Song of Night (1932)
- Spies at Work (1933)
- One Night's Song (1933)
- Her Highness the Saleswoman (1933)
- A Song for You (1933)
- All for Love (1933)
- My Heart Calls You (1934)
- So Ended a Great Love (1934)
- My Heart Is Calling You (1934)
- The Divine Spark (1935)
- My Heart Is Calling (1935)
- I Love All the Women (1935)
- The Blonde Carmen (1935)
- Conquest of the Air (1936)
- Return of the Scarlet Pimpernel (1937)
- Conflict (1938)
- The Lafarge Case (1938)
- Love Cavalcade (1940)
- The Shanghai Gesture (1941)
- Hangmen Also Die! (1943)
- It Happened Tomorrow (1944)
- A Scandal in Paris (1946)
- The Lost One (1951)
