= Cine-Allianz =

German film company

Cine-Allianz Tonfilm was a German film production company established in 1932 by Arnold Pressburger and Gregor Rabinovitch. The company specialised in co-productions targeted at international markets, and enjoyed immediate success during the final year of the Weimar Republic. During the Nazi era the company's Jewish owners came under increasing pressure from the government and their property was expropriated. They were forced into exile, while Cine-Allianz continued to produce films under the Nazi regime until its merger with UFA in 1942.

Rabinovitch went into exile in France where he set up a fresh production company also named Cine-Allianz which produced films such as I Was an Adventuress (1938) and Beating Heart (1940).

The 1951 West German film The Lost One was partly financed by money received as post-war compensation for the loss of Cine-Allianz.

== Selected filmography ==
- My Cousin from Warsaw (1931)
- Tell Me Tonight (1932)
- One Night's Song (1933)
- A Song for You (1933)
- So Ended a Great Love (1934)
- I Love All the Women (1935)
- The Merry Wives (1936)
- Tomfoolery (1936)
- The Impossible Woman (1936)
- Mystery About Beate (1938)
- Secret Mission (1938)
- Marriage in Small Doses (1939)
- Six Days of Leave (1941)

== Bibliography ==
- Gerd Gemünden. Continental Strangers: German Exile Cinema, 1933-1951. Columbia University Press, 2014.
