= Little Veronica =

1929 film

- Directed by: Robert Land
- Written by: Felix Salten (novelette); Max Jungk; Robert Land
- Produced by: Georg C. Horetsky; Robert Land; Seymour Nebenzal
- Starring: Käthe von Nagy; Maly Delschaft; Mizzi Zwerenz
- Cinematography: Otto Kanturek; Bruno Timm
- Production companies: Nero-Film; Pan-Film; Wien-Film
- Distributed by: Vereinigte Star-Film (Germany); Mondial Filmverleih (Austria)
- Release date: 21 November 1929
- Countries: Austria; Germany
- Languages: Silent; German intertitles

Little Veronica (German: Die kleine Veronika) is a 1929 Austrian-German silent film directed by Robert Land and starring Käthe von Nagy, Maly Delschaft and Mizzi Zwerenz.

The film's art direction was by Julius von Borsody.

== Cast ==
- Käthe von Nagy as Veronika - deren Tochter
- Maly Delschaft as Rosi - ihre Tante
- Mizzi Zwerenz as Kathi
- Harry Hardt as Ferdinand
- Karl Forest as Ein reicher Wiener Hausbesitzer
- Gustl Werner as Eugen
- Artur Ranzenhofer as Franz Weber - ein Dorfschreiber
- Anny Ranzenhofer as Frau Weber - seine Frau
- Gaby Gilles as Gusti
- Otto Hartmann as Franzl
- Anita Muthsam as Mali
- Lizzi Natzler
- Otto Schmöle
- Richard Waldemar

== Bibliography ==
- Jennifer M. Kapczynski & Michael D. Richardson. A New History of German Cinema.
