= Costenoble =

Costenoble is a German surname. Notable people with the surname include:

- Anna Costenoble (1866–1930), German artist
- August Costenoble (1894–1976), Belgian painter
- Karl Costenoble (1837–1907), Austrian sculptor and politician
- Johann Jakob Costenoble (1766–1838), German judge and politician
- Johanna Costenoble (1777–1828), German actress
- Karl Ludwig Costenoble (1769–1837), German actor, director and writer
