= Zwerenz =

Zwerenz is a surname. Notable people with the surname include:

- Gerhard Zwerenz (1925–2015), German writer and politician
- Mizzi Zwerenz (1876–1947), Austrian opera singer, theater and film actress
