= Storm in a Water Glass =

Storm in a Water Glass may refer to:

- Storm in a Water Glass (1931 film), an Austrian-German comedy film
- Storm in a Water Glass (1960 film), a West German comedy film
