= 4th Venice International Film Festival =

Italian film festival in 1936

- Festival poster
- Location: Venice, Italy
- Founded: 1932
- Festival date: 10 – 31 August 1936
- Website: Website

Venice Film Festival chronology
- 5th 3rd

The 4th annual Venice International Film Festival was held between 10 and 31 August 1936. This year saw an international jury nominated for the first time.

== Jury ==
- Giuseppe Volpi di Misurata, Italian - Jury President
- Ottavio Croze, Italian
- Giacomo Paolucci de'Calboli, Italian
- Luigi Freddi, Italian
- Mario Gromo, Italian
- Neville Kearney, British
- Oswald Lehnich, German
- Antonio Maraini, Italian
- Karl Meltzer, German
- Filippo Sacchi, Italian
- Ryszard Ordynski, Polish
- Louis Villani, Hungarian
- Émile Vuillermoz, French

== In-Competition films ==
- La Kermesse héroïque by Jacques Feyder
- Der Kaiser von Kalifornien by Luis Trenker
- The Ghost Goes West by René Clair
- The Great Ziegfeld by Robert Z. Leonard
- It Was Me by Arthur Bárdos
- Lo squadrone bianco by Augusto Genina
- Mayerling by Anatole Litvak
- Mr. Deeds Goes to Town by Frank Capra
- Show Boat by James Whale
- The Story of Louis Pasteur by William Dieterle
- Veille d'armes by Marcel L'Herbier

== Awards ==
- Best Foreign Film: Der Kaiser von Kalifornien by Luis Trenker
- Best Italian Film: Lo squadrone bianco by Augusto Genina
- Volpi Cup:
  - Best Actor: Paul Muni for The Story of Louis Pasteur
  - Best Actress: Annabella for Veille d'armes
- Special Recommendation:
  - Ave Maria by Johannes Riemann
  - Children's Corner by Marcel L'Herbier, Emile Vuillermoz
  - Mary of Scotland by John Ford
  - Marysa by Josef Rovenský
  - Metropolitan Nocturne by Leigh Jason
  - Mr. Deeds Goes to Town by Frank Capra
  - Opernring by Carmine Gallone
  - Polesie by Maksymilian Emmer, Jerzy Maliniak
  - Pompei by Giorgio Ferroni
  - Scrooge by Henry Edwards
  - The Mine by J. B. Holmes
  - The Robber Symphony by Friedrich Feher
  - Verräter by Karl Ritter
- Animated Film: Who Killed Cock Robin? by Walt Disney
- Color Film: The Trail of the Lonesome Pine by Henry Hathaway
- Best Director: La Kermesse héroïque by Jacques Feyder
- Best Cinematography: Tudor Rose by Mutz Greenbaum
