= Champion of the World =

Champion of the World may refer to:

- Holder of a World championship
- "We Are the Champions", a 1977 song by the band, Queen
- The Champion of the World, a short story by Roald Dahl later adapted into Danny, the Champion of the World
- The nineteenth chapter of I Know Why the Caged Bird Sings
- The Champion of the World (1927 film), a German silent film
- Champion of the World (2021 film), a Russian drama film
- "Champion of the World" (song), a 2020 single by Coldplay
