= Dyckerpotts' Heirs =

1928 film

- Directed by: Hans Behrendt
- Written by: Robert Grötzach (play); Hans Behrendt; Franz Schulz
- Starring: Paul Hörbiger; Georg Alexander
- Cinematography: Eduard Hoesch
- Production company: Felsom Film
- Distributed by: Deutsche Fox
- Release date: 2 October 1928
- Country: Germany
- Languages: Silent; German intertitles

Dyckerpotts' Heirs (German: Dyckerpotts Erben) is a 1928 German silent comedy film directed by Hans Behrendt. It was based on a 1917 Robert Grötzach-penned play by the same name. It was shot at the Staaken Studios in Berlin. The film's art direction was by Emil Hasler and Oscar Friedrich Werndorff. It was distributed by the German branch of Fox Film.

== Cast ==
In alphabetical order

- Georg Alexander
- Paul Biensfeldt
- Hanne Brinkmann
- Oscar Ebelsbacher
- Pepi Glöckner-Kramer
- Ilka Grüning
- Paul Hörbiger
- Lotte Lorring
- Paul Morgan
- Fred Solm
- Paul Westermeier

== Bibliography ==
- Bock, Hans-Michael & Bergfelder, Tim. The Concise Cinegraph: Encyclopaedia of German Cinema. Berghahn Books, 2009.
