= The Face at Your Window =

1920 film by Richard Stanton

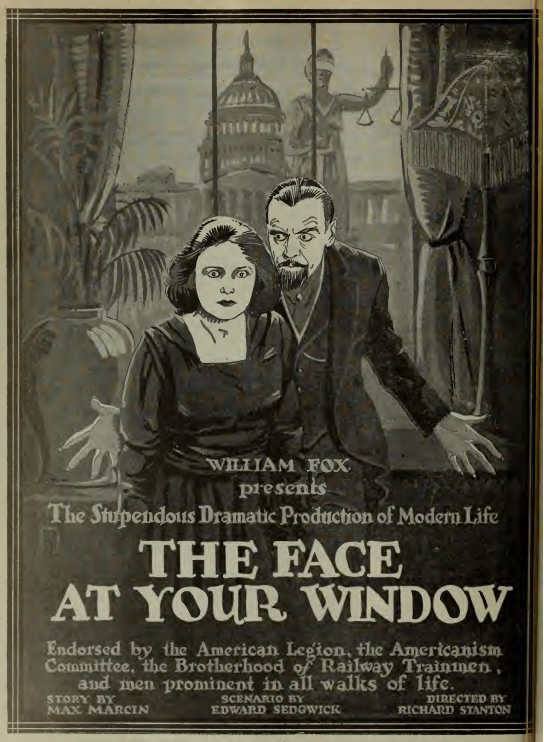
- Directed by: Richard Stanton
- Screenplay by: Edward Sedgwick
- Story by: Max Marcin
- Starring: Gina Relly; Earl Metcalfe; Edward Roseman; Boris Rosenthal; Walter McEwen; Diana Allen
- Cinematography: Horace G. Plympton
- Production company: Fox Film Corporation
- Distributed by: Fox Film Corporation
- Release date: October 31, 1920
- Running time: 70 minutes
- Country: United States
- Language: English

The Face at Your Window is a lost 1920 American drama film directed by Richard Stanton and written by Edward Sedgwick. The film stars Gina Relly, Earl Metcalfe, Edward Roseman, Boris Rosenthal, Walter McEwen and Diana Allen. The film was released on October 31, 1920, by Fox Film Corporation.

== Cast ==
- Gina Relly as Ruth Kravo
- Earl Metcalfe as Frank Maxwell
- Edward Roseman as Comrade Kelvin
- Boris Rosenthal as Ivan Koyloff
- Walter McEwen as Hiram Maxwell
- Diana Allen as 'Dot' Maxwell
- Alice Reeves as Ethel Harding
- Frazer Coulter as Nicholas Harding
- William Corbett as Steve Drake
- Robert Cummings as Kravo
- Henry Armetta as Danglo
- Frank Farrington as District Attorney
