= Odette (1928 film) =

1928 film

- Directed by: Luitz-Morat
- Written by: Herbert Juttke; Georg C. Klaren; Luitz-Morat
- Based on: Odette by Victorien Sardou
- Produced by: Hermann Fellner; Arnold Pressburger; Josef Somlo
- Starring: Francesca Bertini; Warwick Ward; Simone Vaudry
- Cinematography: Otto Kanturek
- Production company: Felsom Film
- Distributed by: Deutsche Lichtspiel-Syndikat
- Release date: 23 March 1928
- Running time: 91 minutes
- Country: Germany
- Languages: Silent; German intertitles

Odette (German: Mein Leben für das Deine) is a 1928 German silent drama film based upon the play by Victorien Sardou, directed by Luitz-Morat, and starring Francesca Bertini, Warwick Ward, and Simone Vaudry. Bertini would star in two other adaptations of the play, Odette (1916) and Odette (1934). It was shot at the Tempelhof Studios of UFA in Berlin. The film's sets were designed by the art directors Emil Hasler and Oscar Friedrich Werndorff.

== Cast ==
- Francesca Bertini as Odette
- Warwick Ward as Graf Georg de Clermont-Latour, ihr Mann
- Simone Vaudry as Jacqueline, beider Tochter
- Fred Solm as Marquis Gaston de Meyran
- Fritz Kortner as Frontenac
- Angelo Ferrari as Cardeilhan
- Alfred Gerasch as Philippe La Hoche

== Bibliography ==
- Goble, Alan. The Complete Index to Literary Sources in Film. Walter de Gruyter, 1999.
