= Number 17 (1928 film) =

1928 film by Géza von Bolváry

- Directed by: Géza von Bolváry
- Written by: Adolf Lantz; Benno Vigny
- Based on: Number 17 by Joseph Jefferson Farjeon
- Produced by: Hermann Fellner; Josef Somlo
- Starring: Guy Newall; Lien Deyers; Carl de Vogt; Fritz Greiner
- Cinematography: Eduard Hoesch
- Production companies: Felsom Film; Gainsborough Pictures
- Distributed by: Woolf and Freedman Film Service (UK); Deutsche Fox (Germany)
- Release date: 30 November 1928
- Running time: 90 minutes
- Country: Germany
- Languages: Silent Version; German Intertitles; Sound (Synchronized); English Intertitles

Number 17 (German: Haus Nummer 17) is a 1928 German-British silent and sound crime film directed by Géza von Bolváry and starring Guy Newall, Lien Deyers, and Carl de Vogt. The English version was produced with sound. While the sound version has no audible dialog, it features a synchronized musical score with sound effects.

The film was based on the 1925 play Number 17 by Joseph Jefferson Farjeon, later adapted by Alfred Hitchcock for his film Number Seventeen (1932). The 1928 film was one of several co-productions made in the 1920s between Britain's Gainsborough Pictures and Germany's Felsom Film. It was shot at the Tempelhof Studios in Berlin. The film's sets were designed by the art director Oscar Friedrich Werndorff.

== Cast ==
- Guy Newall as Ben
- Lien Deyers as Elsie Ackroyd
- Carl de Vogt as Gilbert Fordyce
- Fritz Greiner as Shelldrake
- Ernst Reicher as Harold Brant
- Hertha von Walther as Nora Brant
- Craighall Sherry as Sam Ackroyd
- Fred Solm as Henry Jobber
- Paul Samson-Körner

== Bibliography ==
- Bergfelder, Tim; Cargnelli, Christian, eds. (2008). Destination London: German-Speaking Emigrés and British Cinema, 1925–1950. New York: Berghahn Books. ISBN 978-0-85745-019-7.
