= Sins of Yesterday =

1922 film

- Directed by: Robert Wüllner
- Written by: Julius Urgiß
- Produced by: Hermann Fellner; Josef Somlo
- Starring: Gina Relly; Alfred Gerasch; Erich Kaiser-Titz
- Cinematography: Werner Brandes
- Production company: Felsom Film
- Release date: 28 July 1922
- Country: Germany
- Languages: Silent; German intertitles

Sins of Yesterday (German: Sünden von gestern) is a 1922 German silent film directed by Robert Wüllner and starring Gina Relly, Alfred Gerasch, and Erich Kaiser-Titz.

== Cast ==
- Gina Relly
- Alfred Gerasch
- Erich Kaiser-Titz
- Jakob Tiedtke
- Alfred Haase
- Arnold Korff
- Max Ruhbeck

== Bibliography ==
- Caneppele, Paolo (2002). Entscheidungen der Tiroler Filmzensur: 1922–1938. Vienna: Film Archiv Austria. ISBN 978-3-901932-12-0.
