= Storm in a Water Glass (1931 film) =

1931 film

- Scene from a film
- German: Sturm im Wasserglas
- Directed by: Georg Jacoby
- Written by: Bruno Frank (play); Felix Salten; Walter Schlee; Walter Wassermann
- Produced by: Hermann Fellner; Josef Somlo
- Starring: Hansi Niese; Renate Müller; Paul Otto; Harald Paulsen
- Cinematography: Guido Seeber; Bruno Timm
- Music by: Stefan Weiß
- Production companies: Sascha Film; Felsom Film
- Distributed by: Felsom Film
- Release date: 13 March 1931
- Countries: Austria; Germany
- Language: German

Storm in a Water Glass (German: Sturm im Wasserglas) is a 1931 Austrian-German comedy film directed by Georg Jacoby and starring Hansi Niese, Renate Müller and Paul Otto. The film is based on the play of the same title by Bruno Frank, later adapted into the British film Storm in a Teacup. The film is known by the alternative title The Flower Woman of Lindenau (Die Blumenfrau von Lindenau). It is notable, in part, for the small role played by Hedy Lamarr in her second film. The film's art direction was by Hans Jacoby.

It premiered in Vienna on 13 March 1931, coinciding with the opening of the Sascha-Filmpalast cinema. The film was remade in 1960.

== Plot ==
An ambitious town councillor feels confident he will be elected the next mayor, but a dispute over a mongrel dog owned by a local flower seller rapidly turns into a scandal which threatens his political career.

== Cast ==
- Hansi Niese, as Frau Vogel - flower woman
- Renate Müller, as Viktoria Thoss
- Paul Otto, as Dr. Thoss - her husband
- Harald Paulsen, as Burdach - editor
- Herbert Hübner, as Quilling - newspaper publisher
- Grete Maren, as Lisa - his wife
- Oscar Sabo, as Pfaffenzeller - Magistrates' servant
- Otto Treßleras presiding judge
- Franz Schafheitlin, as Prosecutor
- Hedy Lamarr, as Secretary
- Eugen Guenther, as assessor #1
- Karl Kneidinger, as assessor #2
- Alfred Neugebauer, as a kid
