= Ghost Train (1927 film) =

1927 film directed by Géza von Bolváry

The Ghost Train
- French poster for the film
- Directed by: Géza von Bolváry
- Written by: Arnold Ridley (play); Adolf Lantz; Benno Vigny
- Produced by: Michael Balcon; Hermann Fellner; Arnold Pressburger; Josef Somlo
- Starring: Guy Newall; Ilse Bois; Louis Ralph; Hilde Jennings
- Cinematography: Otto Kanturek
- Music by: Willy Schmidt-Gentner
- Production companies: Gainsborough Pictures; Phoebus Film
- Distributed by: Woolf & Freedman Film Service
- Release dates: September 1927 (UK); 29 October 1927 (Germany)
- Running time: 6,500 feet
- Countries: Germany; United Kingdom
- Languages: Silent; English/German intertitles

The Ghost Train (German: Der Geisterzug) is a 1927 German-British crime comedy film directed by Géza von Bolváry and starring Guy Newall, Ilse Bois and Louis Ralph. It is an adaptation of Arnold Ridley's play The Ghost Train. The film was a co-production between Gainsborough Pictures and Phoebus Film and was shot at the latter's Staaken Studios in Berlin. The film was released in France as Le Train Fantome.

Some sources have reported over the years that the film was directed by famed Hungarian director Michael Curtiz but, according to critic Troy Howarth, "he's not credited on the prints, nor is the title attributed to him in any reputable source".

The story was filmed again (with sound) in 1931.

== Plot ==
Some strange supernatural phenomenon starts to occur in a railway station, leading members of the public to avoid the place. It turns out some criminals are faking the strange events to keep people away from the station to protect their smuggling operations.

== Cast ==
- Guy Newall as Teddy Deakin
- Ilse Bois as Miss Bourne
- Louis Ralph as Saul Hodgkin
- Hilde Jennings as Peggy Murdock
- John Manners as Charles Murdock
- Sinaida Korolenko as Elsie Winthrop
- Ernő Verebes as Richard Winthrop
- Hertha von Walther as Julia Price

== Bibliography ==
- Bergfelder, Tim; Cargnelli, Christian, eds. (2008). Destination London: German-Speaking Emigrés and British Cinema, 1925–1950. New York: Berghahn Books. ISBN 978-0-85745-019-7.
- Low, Rachael; Manvell, Roger (1971). The History of the British Film, 1918–1929. London: Allen & Unwin. ISBN 978-0-04-791021-0.
- Workman, Christopher; Howarth, Troy (2016). Tome of Terror: Horror Films of the Silent Era. Baltimore: Midnight Marquee Press. p. 312. ISBN 978-1-936168-68-2.
