= The Woman on the Rack =

1928 German silent drama film

- Directed by: Robert Wiene
- Written by: Edward Hemmerde (play); Francis Neilson (play); Arthur Bárdos
- Produced by: Hermann Fellner; Josef Somlo
- Starring: Lili Damita; Vladimir Gajdarov; Johannes Riemann
- Cinematography: Otto Kanturek; Bruno Timm
- Production company: Felsom-Film
- Distributed by: Deutsche Fox
- Release date: 13 September 1928
- Country: Germany
- Languages: Silent; German intertitles

The Woman on the Rack (German: Die Frau auf der Folter) is a 1928 German silent drama film directed by Robert Wiene and starring Lili Damita, Vladimir Gajdarov, and Johannes Riemann. It was also known by the alternative title A Scandal in Paris. It was based on a British play by Edward Hemmerde and Francis Neilson. The wife of a British aristocratic politician, who is neglected by her husband, resists an attempt to break them up. When her husband discovers what he mistakenly believes to be a dalliance with another man he begins divorce proceedings. Eventually the truth comes out and the couple reconcile. The film was not considered one of Wiene's greatest achievements, but he was praised for directing with his usual competence while Damita's performance as Lady Admaston was hailed.

== Cast ==
In alphabetical order

- Lili Damita as Lady Admaston
- Vladimir Gajdarov
- Vivian Gibson
- Leopold Kramer
- Arthur Pusey
- Johannes Riemann
- Ferdinand von Alten
- Helene von Bolváry

== Bibliography ==
- Jung, Uli; Schatzberg, Walter (1999). Beyond Caligari: The Films of Robert Wiene. New York: Berghahn Books. ISBN 978-1-57181-156-1.
