= Max Devrient =

German actor (1857–1929)

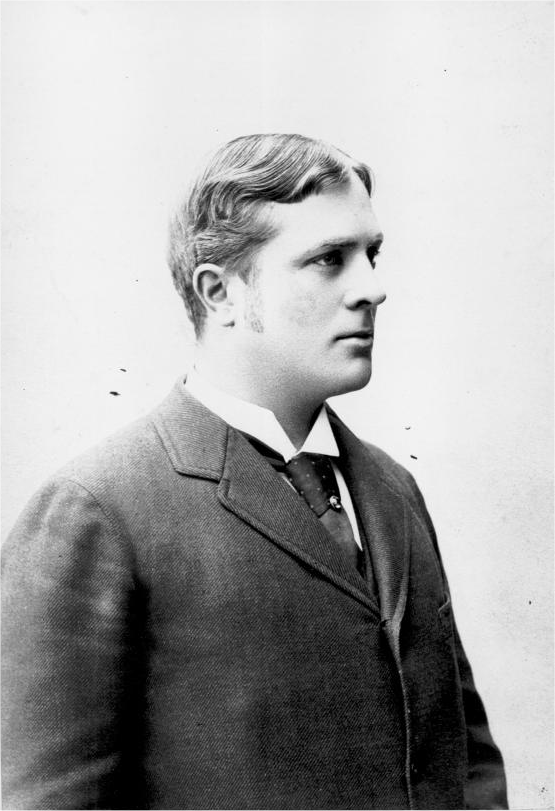
- Devrient, ca. 1885
- Born: Maximilian Paul Devrient; 12 December 1857; Hanover, Kingdom of Hanover
- Died: 14 June 1929 (aged 71); Chur, Graubünden, Switzerland
- Occupation: Actor
- Years active: 1920-1924 (film)

Max Devrient (12 December 1857 – 14 June 1929) was a German-born stage and film actor. He worked at the Burgtheater in Vienna throughout his career, and in 1920 was made chief director. He was the son of the actor Karl August Devrient.

== Selected filmography ==
- The Daughter of the Brigadier (1922)
- Sunken Worlds (1922)
- Money in the Streets (1922)
- Meriota the Dancer (1922)
- Confessions of a Monk (1922)

== Bibliography ==
- William Grange. Historical Dictionary of German Theater. Rowman & Littlefield, 2015.
