= Melchior Lengyel =

Hungarian writer, playwright and screenwriter (1880–1974)

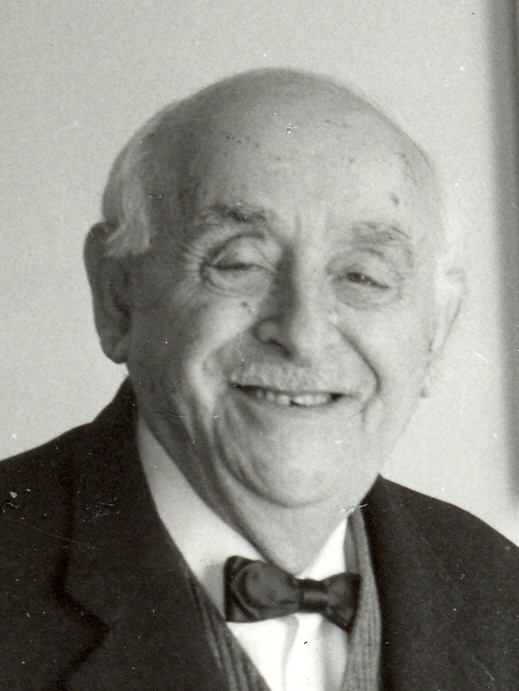
- Born: Menyhért Lebovics; 12 January 1880; Balmazújváros, Kingdom of Hungary, Austria-Hungary
- Died: 23 October 1974 (aged 94); Budapest, Hungarian People's Republic
- Resting place: Farkasréti Cemetery
- Occupations: Writer, playwright, screenwriter
- Spouse: Lídia Gerő (m. 1917)
- Children: Thomas Lengyel (b. 1919); Anne Lengyel (b. 1929)
- Writing career
- Period: 1907–1965
- Genres: Drama, film, literature

Melchior Lengyel (born Menyhért Lebovics; Hungarian: Lengyel Menyhért; 12 January 1880 – 23 October 1974) was a Jewish Hungarian writer, dramatist, and film screenwriter.

== Biography ==
Lengyel was born Menyhért Lebovics in 1880, the second of six children in a Jewish family, in rural Hungary, in Sajohidveg, where his father supported the family as a farming supervisor. He started his writing career as a reviewer and journalist. He worked first in Kassa (Košice), then later in Budapest.

His first play, A nagy fejedelem (The Great Prince) was performed by the Thalia Company in 1907. The Hungarian National Theatre performed his next drama A hálás utókor (The Grateful Posterity) in 1908 for which he received the Vojnits Award from the Hungarian Academy of Sciences, given every year for the best play. Taifun (Typhoon), one of his plays, written in 1909, became a worldwide success and is still performed today. It was adapted to the screen in the United States in 1914.

His articles were often published in Nyugat (West), the most important Hungarian literary journal in the first half of the 20th century. During World War I, he was sent to Switzerland by the Hungarian daily newspaper Az Est (The Evening) as a reporter. His pacifist articles and other publications written in 1918 were also published in German and French papers and were collected in a book called Egyszerű gondolatok (Simple Thoughts).

His story The Miraculous Mandarin (A csodálatos mandarin), a "pantomime grotesque" came out in 1916. It is the story which inspired Béla Bartók, the famous Hungarian composer, to create in 1924 the ballet The Miraculous Mandarin.

After World War I, Lengyel went to the United States for a longer stay and published his experiences in 1922 in a book Amerikai napló (American Journal). In the 1920s, he was active in the film industry. For some time, he was story editor at May-Film in Berlin. In 1929/30, he was co-director of a Budapest theatre. In 1931, he was sent by the Hungarian newspaper Pesti Napló (Pest Journal) to London as its reporter. The story of his Utopian novel A boldog város (The Happy City) came out in 1931; it was set in an American city that lay in the depths of a chasm created by the great Californian earthquake.

Lengyel moved to Hollywood, California in 1937 and became a screenwriter. Several of his stories were the basis of screenplays for films by Ernst Lubitsch which became worldwide successes such as Ninotchka (1939), for which he was nominated for the Academy Award for Best Writing, Original Story, To Be or Not to Be (1942) and the 1937 film Angel, starring Marlene Dietrich.

In 1960, Lengyel returned to Europe and settled in Italy. In 1963, he received the Great Award of Rome for his literary works.

Following the Hungarian Revolution of 1956, Lengyel often visited his home country and in 1974, he returned to live in Budapest, where he died shortly afterward at the age of 94.

The public library of his native town of Balmazújváros, was named after him in 2004. A complete list of Lengyel's works as well as the articles and references about him and his publications were compiled by one of the librarians on this occasion.

== Selected filmography ==
- The Gypsy Baron (1927)
- The Famous Woman (1927)
- Ninotchka (1939)
- To Be or Not to Be (1942)
