= Three Days of Love =

1931 film

- Directed by: Heinz Hilpert
- Written by: Heinz Hilpert; Joe Lederer
- Produced by: Hermann Fellner; Josef Somlo
- Starring: Hans Albers; Käthe Dorsch; Trude Berliner
- Cinematography: Otto Kanturek
- Music by: Friedrich Hollaender
- Production company: Felsom Film
- Distributed by: Felsom Film
- Release date: 18 February 1931
- Running time: 101 minutes
- Country: Germany
- Language: German

Three Days of Love (German: Drei Tage Liebe) is a 1931 German drama film directed by Heinz Hilpert and starring Hans Albers, Käthe Dorsch, and Trude Berliner. It was made and distributed by the independent Felsom Film company. It was shot at the Tempelhof Studios in Berlin. The film's sets were designed by the art director Hans Jacoby.

== Synopsis ==
A poor servant girl falls in love with a man but becomes convinced that he will leave her because of her poverty. Encouraged in this belief by his jealous former lover, she steals a ring and smart clothes to try and impress him. However, this leads only to tragedy.

== Cast ==
- Hans Albers as Franz
- Käthe Dorsch as Lena
- Trude Berliner as Carla
- Paul Samson-Körner as Emil
- Hansi Arnstaedt as Frau Wernicke
- Oskar Groß as Herr Wernicke
- Ruth Jacobsen as Freundin des Chauffeurs
- Lotte Stein as Köchin
- Carl Jönsson as Autobesitzer
- Rudolf Platte as Chauffeur
- Riel van Rappart as Monteur
- Jakob Sinn as Erster Polizist
- Harry Nestor as Zweiter Polizist
- Luigi Bernauer
- Camillo Kossuth
- Heinrich Marlow
- Fritz Odemar

== Bibliography ==
- Bock, Hans-Michael; Bergfelder, Tim, eds. (2009). The Concise Cinegraph: Encyclopaedia of German Cinema. New York: Berghahn Books. ISBN 978-1-57181-655-9.
