= Bruno Frank =

German writer (1887–1945)

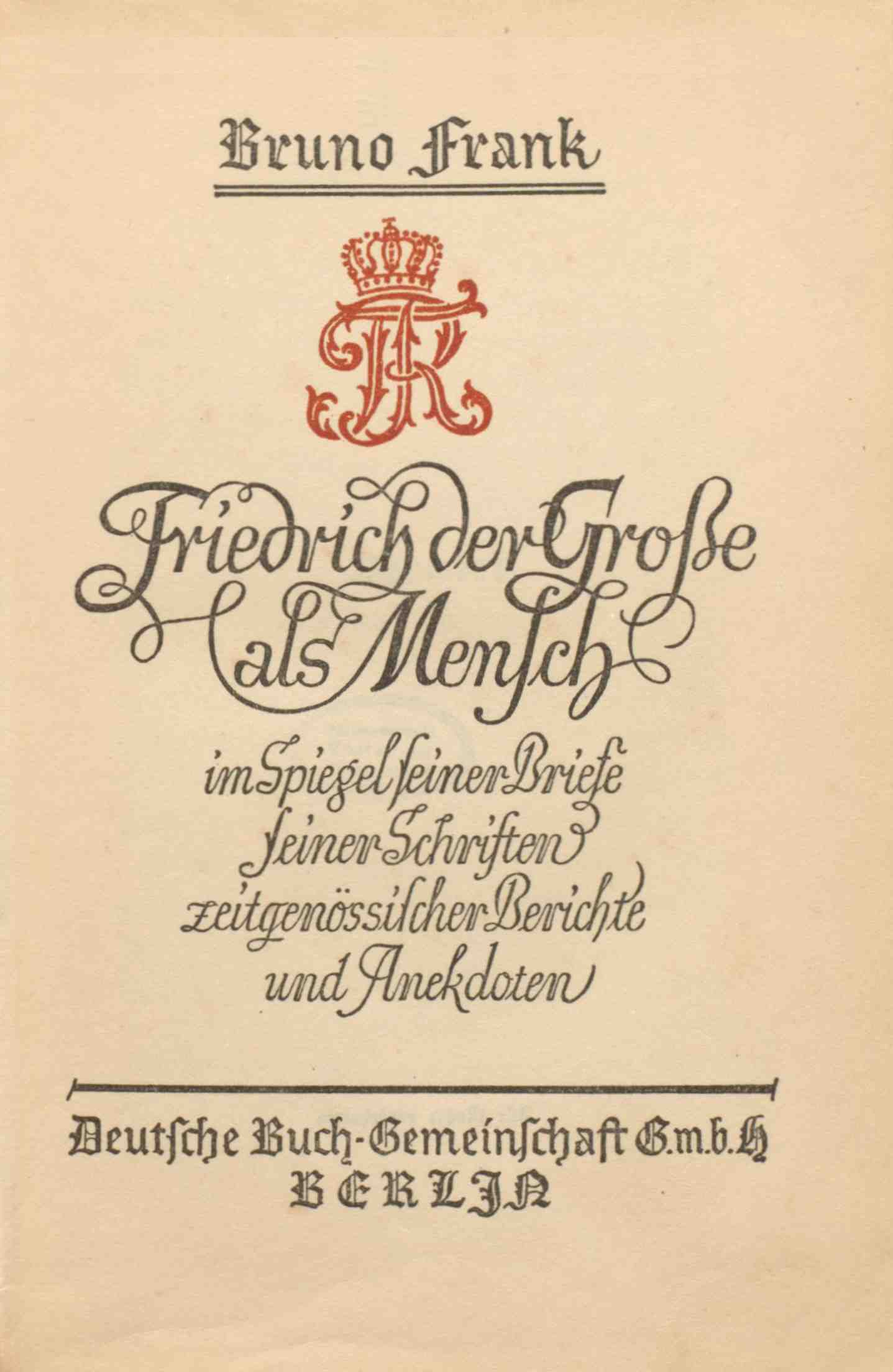

Bruno Frank (June 13, 1887 – June 20, 1945) was a German author, poet, playwright, screenwriter, and humanist.

== Biography ==
Frank was born in Stuttgart. He studied law and philosophy in Munich, where he later worked as a dramatist and novelist until the Reichstag fire in 1933. Persecuted by the government because of his Jewish heritage, he left Nazi Germany with his wife, Liesl, daughter of famed Jewish operetta diva Fritzi Massary and Count Karl Coudenhove. They lived for four years in Austria and England, before emigrating in 1937 to the United States, where he was reunited with his friends Heinrich Mann and Thomas Mann. Frank is considered part of the group of anti-Nazi writers whose works constitute German Exilliteratur. He continued to write, producing two novels, and worked in the film industry for the rest of his life.

Frank wrote the screenplay for the popular movie version of The Hunchback of Notre Dame (1939 film), directed by William Dieterle and starring Charles Laughton, based on the novel by Victor Hugo. Frank's play, Sturm im Wasserglas, was filmed in Great Britain, in 1937, as Storm in a Teacup, and posthumously made into a movie directed by Josef von Báky in 1960.

His nephew Anthony M. Frank became United States Postmaster General in 1988.

Frank died of a heart attack in Beverly Hills. He is interred in the Forest Lawn Memorial Park Cemetery in Glendale, California.

== Works ==
- novel The Days of the King (1924)
- novel Trenck (1924)
- play Twelve Thousand (1927)
- comic play Storm Over Patsy (1930)
- historical novel A Man Called Cervantes (1934)
- short story collection "The Magician and Other Stories" (1947)
- novel "One Fair Daughter" (1943) (English language version translated from the German by Claire Trask) (German title: Die Tochter [The Daughter])

== Selected filmography ==
- Different Morals, directed by Gerhard Lamprecht (1931, based on the play Perlenkomödie)
- Storm in a Water Glass, directed by Georg Jacoby (1931, based on the play Sturm im Wasserglas)
- Trenck, directed by Ernst Neubach and Heinz Paul (1932, based on the novel Trenck)
- Sutter's Gold, directed by James Cruze (1936, based on a novel by Blaise Cendrars and a play by Bruno Frank)
- Storm in a Teacup, directed by Victor Saville and Ian Dalrymple (1937, based on the play Sturm im Wasserglas)
- Storm in a Water Glass, directed by Josef von Báky (1960, based on the play Sturm im Wasserglas)
- Cervantes, directed by Vincent Sherman (1967, based on the novel Cervantes)

Screenwriter

- Peter Voss, Thief of Millions (dir. E. A. Dupont, 1932)
- Heart's Desire (dir. Paul L. Stein, 1935)
- The Hunchback of Notre Dame (dir. William Dieterle, 1939)
- Northwest Passage (dir. King Vidor, 1940), uncredited
- A Royal Scandal (dir. Otto Preminger, 1945)

== See also ==
- Exilliteratur
