= The Gallant Hussar =

1928 German-British romance film

- Directed by: Géza von Bolváry
- Written by: Arthur Bárdos; Margarete-Maria Langen
- Produced by: Hermann Fellner; Josef Somlo
- Starring: Ivor Novello; Evelyn Holt; Hilde Hildebrand; Paul Hörbiger
- Cinematography: Eduard Hoesch
- Production companies: Gainsborough Pictures; Felsom-Film
- Distributed by: Woolf & Freedman Film Service; Deutsche Fox
- Release date: September 1928
- Running time: 6,666 feet
- Countries: Germany; United Kingdom
- Languages: Silent; English/German intertitles

The Gallant Hussar (German: Der fesche Husar) is a 1928 German-British romance film directed by Géza von Bolváry and starring Ivor Novello, Evelyn Holt, and Paul Hörbiger. It was based on a story by the Hungarian writer Arthur Bárdos and Margarete-Maria Langen.

The film was a co-production made under an agreement between Gainsborough Pictures and the German studio Felsom-Film and was shot in Berlin. After the passage of the Cinematograph Films Act 1927 by the British Parliament it was classified under the terms of the Act as a foreign film and only received a limited release in Britain. It is also known under the alternative title The Bold Dragoon. It is now considered a lost film.

Along with A South Sea Bubble (1928), the film marked a significant change in the role played by Novello. He had previously appeared as unsettled, outsider figures in films such as The Lodger, but from now on played more well-balanced romantic figures.

== Synopsis ==
The daughter of an American millionaire falls in love with a Hungarian hussar officer during a visit to the Austrian Empire.

== Cast ==
- Ivor Novello as Lieutenant Stephen Alrik
- Evelyn Holt as Mary Wentworth
- Paul Hörbiger as Baron von Korporetzky
- Paul Otto as Oberst von Stromm
- Hilde Hildebrand as Vilma von Noszty
- Ernő Verebes as Bubenyik
- Ibolya Szekely as Katy
- Gyula Szőreghy as Herr Ocks
- Fritz Alberti as Michael Toth
- Franz Paray as Paul von Noszty
- Elisabeth Pinajeff as Rosie Velkovicz

== Bibliography ==
- Bergfelder, Tim; Cargnelli, Christian, eds. (2008). Destination London: German-Speaking Emigrés and British Cinema, 1925–1950. New York: Berghahn Books. ISBN 978-0-85745-019-7.
- Low, Rachael (1997) [1971]. The History of British Film. Vol. IV, 1918–1929. Hoboken, NJ: Routledge. ISBN 978-1-136-20634-4.
- Slattery-Christy, David (2008). In Search of Ruritania: Ivor Novello. Milton Keynes: AuthorHouse. ISBN 978-1-5403-9082-0.
- Williams, Michael (2003). Ivor Novello: Screen Idol. London: British Film Institute. ISBN 978-0-85170-982-6.
