= The Daughter of the Brigadier =

1922 Austrian silent film

- Directed by: Friedrich Porges
- Written by: Alexandre Dumas (play); Friedrich Porges
- Produced by: Friedrich Porges
- Starring: Grit Haid; Nora Gregor; Max Devrient
- Cinematography: Willy Winterstein
- Production company: Sun-Film
- Release date: 14 April 1922
- Running time: 78 minutes
- Country: Austria
- Languages: Silent; German intertitles

The Daughter of the Brigadier (German: Die Tochter des Brigadiers) is a 1922 Austrian silent film directed by Friedrich Porges and starring Grit Haid, Nora Gregor and Max Devrient.

The film's sets were designed by the art director Oscar Friedrich Werndorff.

== Cast ==
- Grit Haid
- Nora Gregor
- Max Devrient
- Hermann Romberg
- Wilhelm Schmidt
- Werner Schott
- Otto Schmöle
- Anton Dorschner

== Bibliography ==
- Parish, Robert. Film Actors Guide. Scarecrow Press, 1977.
