= The Great Adventuress =

1928 film directed by Robert Wiene

- Directed by: Robert Wiene
- Written by: Ferdinand Ujhelyi
- Produced by: Hermann Fellner; Josef Somlo
- Starring: Lili Damita; Georg Alexander; Fred Solm
- Cinematography: Otto Kanturek
- Production company: Felsom Film
- Distributed by: Deutsche Fox
- Release date: 9 October 1928
- Running time: 92 minutes
- Country: Germany
- Languages: Silent; German intertitles

The Great Adventuress (German: Die große Abenteuerin) is a 1928 German silent comedy film directed by Robert Wiene and starring Lili Damita, Georg Alexander, and Fred Solm. Much of the film's funding came from Britain. Location shooting took place in Paris, Calais and London. The film's plot was criticised by reviews for lacking clarity.

== Synopsis ==
The film centres on the rivalry between two competing aviation firms, one British and the other French. While in London, visiting his competitors, the head of the French firm falls in love with a young woman who turns out to be the daughter of his British rival. The film eventually ends with them marrying and the two firms merging.

== Cast ==
- Lili Damita
- Georg Alexander
- Fred Solm
- Trude Hesterberg
- Félix de Pomés
- Paul Hörbiger
- Rudolf Lettinger
- Paul Rehkopf
- Heinrich Schroth

== Bibliography ==
- Jung, Uli; Schatzberg, Walter (1999). Beyond Caligari: The Films of Robert Wiene. New York: Berghahn Books. ISBN 978-1-57181-156-1.
