= Strauss: The Waltz King =

1928 film

- German film poster
- German: Heut' spielt der Strauss
- Directed by: Conrad Wiene
- Written by: Robert Wiene
- Produced by: Hermann Fellner; Josef Somlo
- Starring: Alfred Abel; Hermine Sterler; Imre Ráday; Antonie Jaeckel
- Cinematography: Franz Planer
- Music by: Bernard Homola
- Production company: Felsom Film
- Distributed by: Deutsche Fox
- Release date: 26 October 1928
- Running time: 104 minutes
- Country: Germany
- Languages: Silent; German intertitles

Strauss: The Waltz King, (German: Heut' spielt der Strauss) is a 1928 German silent drama film directed by Conrad Wiene and starring Alfred Abel, Hermine Sterler and Imre Ráday. The film was made at the Tempelhof Studios in Berlin. The film's sets were designed by the art director Robert A. Dietrich It portrays the relationship between the father and son Austrian composers Johann Strauss I and Johann Strauss II.

== Cast ==
- Alfred Abel as Johann Strauss father
- Hermine Sterler as Anna, his wife
- Imre Ráday as Johann Strauss son
- Antonie Jaeckel as Deisinger's wife
- Willy Schmieder as Deisinger
- Lilian Ellis as Liesl
- Ferdinand Bonn as Drechsler
- Trude Hesterberg as Trampusch
- Jakob Tiedtke as Wieß
- Paul Hörbiger as Lamperlhirsch
- Eugen Neufeld as Grand Duke
- John Mylong as Mödlinger

== See also ==
- A Waltz by Strauss (1931)
