= Linden Lady on the Rhine =

1927 film

- Maly Delschaft in a scene.
- Directed by: Rolf Randolf
- Written by: Emanuel Alfieri
- Starring: Maly Delschaft; Carl de Vogt; Fred Solm
- Cinematography: Julius Balting
- Music by: Willy Schmidt-Gentner
- Production company: Phoebus Film
- Distributed by: Phoebus Film
- Release date: 27 July 1927
- Country: Germany
- Languages: Silent; German intertitles

Linden Lady on the Rhine (German: Lindenwirtin am Rhein) is a 1927 German silent film directed by Rolf Randolf and starring Maly Delschaft, Carl de Vogt and Alfred Solm.

The film's art direction was by Gustav A. Knauer.

== Cast ==
In alphabetical order

- Iris Arlan as Kellnerin Toni
- Gerd Briese as Henning Schott
- Gertrud de Lalsky as Fürstin Liebingen von Hohrath
- Carl de Vogt as Dr. Allertag
- Maly Delschaft as Lindenwirtin
- Julius Falkenstein as Diener
- Oskar Marion as Graf Hasso von Aich
- Maria Matray
- Alexander Murski as Fürst Liebingen von Hohrath
- Fred Solm as Detlev Allertag
- Emmy Wyda as Miß Philpotts

== Bibliography ==
- Douglas B. Thomas. The early history of German motion pictures, 1895-1935. Thomas International, 1999.
