= Dancing Mad =

1925 film

- Film poster
- German: Der Tänzer meiner Frau
- Directed by: Alexander Korda
- Written by: Paul Armont (play); Jacques Bousquet (play); Adolf Lantz; Alexander Korda
- Produced by: Hermann Fellner; Josef Somlo
- Starring: María Corda; Victor Varconi; Willy Fritsch; Livio Pavanelli
- Cinematography: Nicolas Farkas
- Edited by: Ratnadip Dey
- Production company: Felsom Film
- Distributed by: UFA
- Release date: 6 November 1925
- Country: Germany
- Languages: Silent; German intertitles

Dancing Mad (German: Der Tänzer meiner Frau) is a 1925 German silent comedy film directed by Alexander Korda and starring Victor Varconi, María Corda and Willy Fritsch. It based on the French play Le Danseur de Madame by Paul Armont and Jacques Bousquet. A free-spirited young wife flirts with an old flame, before finally settling down in her marriage.

== Cast ==
- Victor Varconi as Edmund Chauvelin
- María Corda as Lucille Chauvelin
- Willy Fritsch as Max de Sillery
- Livio Pavanelli as Claude Gerson
- Lea Seidl as Mad. Ivonne Trieux
- Hans Junkermann as prima dancer
- Hermann Thimig as Der Diener
- Olga Limburg as the maid
- Marlene Dietrich as dancing extra
- Alexander Choura as dancing extra
- John Loder as dancing extra
