= Gina Relly =

French actress

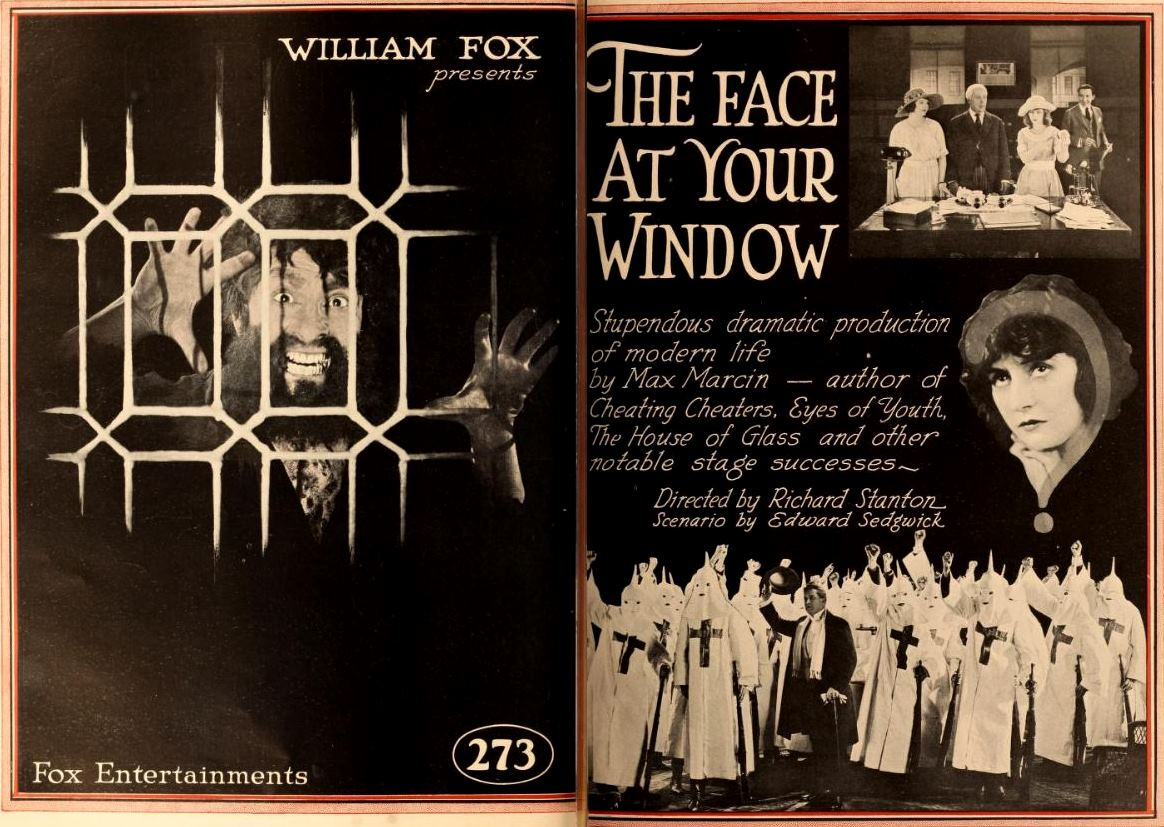
- Relly at right in ad for The Face at Your Window (1920)
- Born: 24 December 1891; Thenon, Dordogne, France
- Died: 4 October 1985 (aged 93); Colombes, Hauts-de-Seine, France
- Other name: Anne-Marie Geneviève Boyer
- Occupation: Actress
- Years active: 1912-1926 (film)

Gina Relly (1891–1985) was a French film actress of the silent era.

== Selected filmography ==
- The Face at Your Window (1920)
- Sins of Yesterday (1922)
- The False Dimitri (1922)
- The Two Boys (1924)
- The Cradle of God (1926)

== Bibliography ==
- Goble, Alan. The Complete Index to Literary Sources in Film. Walter de Gruyter, 1999.
