= Storm in a Water Glass (1960 film) =

1960 film

- German: Sturm im Wasserglas
- Directed by: Josef von Báky
- Written by: Bruno Frank (play); Gregor von Rezzori
- Produced by: Hans Abich; Eberhard Krause; Rolf Thiele
- Starring: Ingrid Andree; Hanns Lothar; Therese Giehse
- Cinematography: Friedl Behn-Grund
- Edited by: Caspar van den Berg
- Music by: Werner Eisbrenner
- Production company: Filmaufbau
- Distributed by: Europa-Filmverleih
- Release date: 3 May 1960
- Running time: 97 minutes
- Country: West Germany
- Language: German

Storm in a Water Glass (German: Sturm im Wasserglas) is a 1960 West German comedy film directed by Josef von Báky and starring Ingrid Andree, Hanns Lothar and Therese Giehse. It is an adaptation of a play by Bruno Frank, which had previously been made into a 1931 film of the same title, and, in 1937, in Great Britain, as, Storm in a Teacup.

It was shot at the Spandau Studios in West Berlin. The film's sets were designed by the art director Erich Kettelhut and Johannes Ott.

== Cast ==
- Ingrid Andree as Viktoria Thoss
- Hanns Lothar as Hans Burdach
- Therese Giehse as Frau Vogel
- Peter Lühr as Dr. Thoss
- Erni Mangold as Lisa
- Harry Meyen as George
- Reinhold Pasch as Möller
- Willy Rösner as Dr. Wirz
- Michl Lang as Pfaffenzeller
- Werner Finck as veterinarian
- Werner Oehlschlaeger as Max Küppers
- Klaus Havenstein as Dressel
- Franz Fröhlich as Hosinger
