= Money in the Streets =

1922 film

- Directed by: Reinhold Schünzel
- Written by: George Randolph Chester (novel); Robert Liebmann
- Produced by: Victor Micheluzzi; Reinhold Schünzel
- Starring: Liane Haid; Liesl Stillmark; Max Ralph-Ostermann
- Cinematography: Carl Hoffmann
- Production company: Micco Film
- Release date: 25 January 1922
- Running time: 105 minutes
- Countries: Austria; Germany
- Languages: Silent; German intertitles

Money in the Streets (German: Das Geld auf der Strasse) is a 1922 Austrian-German silent drama film directed by Reinhold Schünzel and starring Liane Haid, Liesl Stillmark and Max Ralph-Ostermann.

The film's sets were designed by the art director Oscar Friedrich Werndorff. It was shot at the Schönbrunn Studios in Vienna.

== Cast ==
- Liane Haid
- Liesl Stillmark
- Max Ralph-Ostermann
- Alfred Neugebauer
- Robert Valberg
- Max Devrient
- Jaro Fürth
- Julius Strebinger
- Josef Moser
- Heinrich Eisenbach
- Eugen Klöpfer
- Reinhold Schünzel
- Hugo Werner-Kahle

== Bibliography ==
- Grange, William. Cultural Chronicle of the Weimar Republic. Scarecrow Press, 2008.
