= Madame Dubarry (1919 film) =

1919 film directed by Ernst Lubitsch

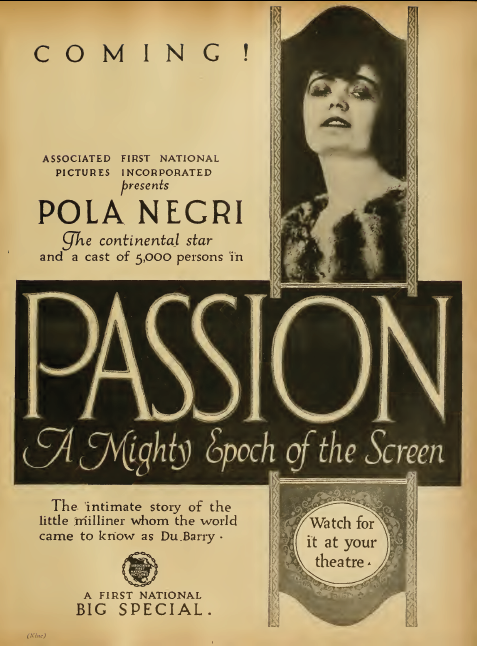
- Ad for film, released in the United States as Passion
- Directed by: Ernst Lubitsch
- Written by: Norbert Falk; Hanns Kräly
- Based on: Memoirs d’un médecin 1848 novel by Alexandre Dumas
- Produced by: Paul Davidson
- Starring: Pola Negri; Emil Jannings
- Cinematography: Theodor Sparkuhl; Kurt Waschneck
- Edited by: Elfi Böttrich
- Music by: William Axt; Hans Jönsson; David Mendoza; Alexander Schirmann
- Production company: PAGU
- Distributed by: UFA (Germany); First National (US)
- Release dates: 18 September 1919 (German; premiere); 26 November 1919 (Denmark); 12 December 1920 (US; as Passion)
- Running time: 85 minutes 114 minutes
- Country: Germany
- Language: Silent film

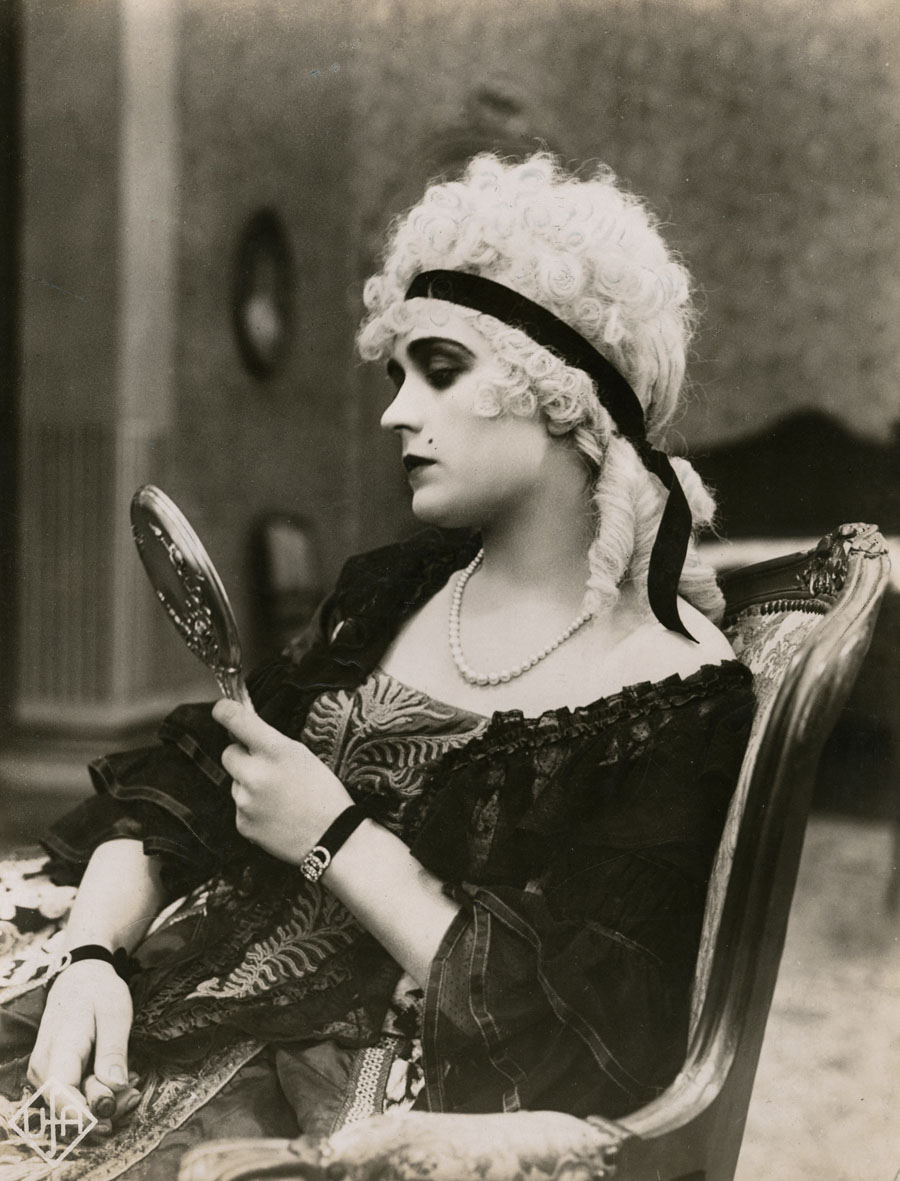
Publicity photo of Pola Negri as Countess Dubarry

Madame Dubarry (1919)

Madame Dubarry (U.S. title Passion) is a 1919 German silent historical film of the life of Madame du Barry. It was directed by Ernst Lubitsch, written by Norbert Falk and Hanns Kräly, with the title role taken by Pola Negri and Louis XV played by Emil Jannings. It was made at the Tempelhof Studios in Berlin. The film's sets were designed by the art director Kurt Richter.

== Plot ==
The plot is presented in seven acts.

Poor seamstress Jeanne Vaubernier works in Madame Labille's milliner's shop. She and student Armand de Foix are a couple, but Jeanne is not averse to flirting with the Spanish ambassador Don Diego. A sword fight breaks out between Armand and Don Diego, in which Don Diego is killed and Armand is arrested.

Jeanne becomes the lover of Count Guillaume Dubarry. When Guillaume is on the verge of bankruptcy because of their shared lavish lifestyle, he sends his lover with a petition to the king's minister, the Duke of Choiseul, who, however, refuses to pay the requested money. On her way back, however, Jeanne catches the eye of King Louis XV himself, who chooses her as his mistress.

When Jeanne receives an insulting letter denigrating her relationship with the king, she demands redress, and the king decides to officially introduce her to court. Before doing so, however, she needs a noble title, so she marries Guillaume's brother, Jean Dubarry. As Countess Dubarry and mistress to the king, she is now the most powerful woman in France. Armand, who was released from prison at her instigation and given a position as a soldier for the king, is appointed lieutenant in the palace guard at her behest. He witnesses how a group of people protesting against the king's mistress is dispersed at gunpoint and begins to detest the mistress, whom he has never met. He is horrified when he recognises her as his former lover. He leaves the palace and turns to his friend Paillet, a shoemaker with a small child and a sick wife. The family has nothing to eat because bread is becoming increasingly expensive and taxes are rising. A protesting crowd forms, led by Armand. They storm the bakery, and Armand is arrested by the king's soldiers.

The Duke of Choiseul makes it clear to Armand that Madame Dubarry has brought him to his misfortune. When Armand says that he would take revenge on her if he were free, Choiseul immediately releases him. A group of rebels forms around the shoemaker Paillet, with Armand initially leading the group. When he receives a visit from the disguised Jeanne, however, he swears not to harm her. The group of rebels goes to the king, but he collapses before their eyes with smallpox. Following a spiteful remark, Madame Dubarry arranges for Paillet's arrest. The king dies of his illness, and Madame Dubarry is banished from the palace by the new king, Louis XVI.

Paillet's wife dies, and Armand promises her on his deathbed that he will free her husband. The revolution begins, and the insurgents storm the Bastille and free Paillet. The king is expelled from the palace, and Madame Dubarry is betrayed by her slave, Zamor. She is sentenced to death by the Revolutionary Tribunal, presided over by Armand. Armand, who tries to help her escape, is shot as a traitor and dies in her arms. Madame Dubarry is executed on the scaffold by guillotine.

== Cast ==
- Pola Negri as Madame Dubarry, formerly Jeanne Vaubernier
- Emil Jannings as Louis XV
- Harry Liedtke as Armand de Foix
- Eduard von Winterstein as Count Jean Dubarry
- Reinhold Schünzel as Minister Choiseul
- Fred Immler as Duke of Richelieu
- Gustav Czimeg as Aiguillon
- Alexander Ekert as Paillet the shoemaker
- Karl Platen as Guillaume Dubarry
- Paul Biensfeldt as Lebelle the valet
- Magnus Stifter as Don Diego
- Wilhelm Kaiser-Heyl as commander of the castle guard
- Else Berna as Geneviève de Gramont
- Marga Köhler as Madame Labille
- Bernhard Goetzke as revolutionary

== Production ==
Madame Dubarry was filmed on the Ufa-Freigelände (open-air grounds), against the backdrop of the Neues Palais in Potsdam, and in the Ufa-Union studio in Tempelhof (Berlin). Censorship banned the film from youth screenings in July 1919. The film premiered on 18 September 1919, at the Ufa-Palast am Zoo in Berlin; it marked the opening of this important Berlin cinema.

== Critical reception ==
Contemporary critics praised the film:

Yes, the evening is best described as a tribute to Negri-Lubitsch. Lubitsch, who was already believed to be at the height of his powers as the director of Carmen, has surpassed himself here and made everything he had achieved before forgotten in the face of this brilliant creation. […] Lubitsch is not one of, but "the" genius of film directing and undoubtedly the best we have today. Whether friend or foe, anyone who sees Countess Dubarry must admit that.

— Lichtbild-Bühne

French critics were initially horrified that French history was being filmed by Germans so soon after the First World War ("The graceful and light era of Louis XV, revived by the sauerkraut gentlemen with their small, round eyes and their heavy bellies!"), but found that "the execution, apart from a few errors, is admirable."

The Lexikon des internationales Films stated that "Lubitsch's popular, but rather careless handling of the subject [...] stood in macabre contrast to the revolutionary unrest in Germany in 1919." Other critics emphasised that "Lubitsch proves himself to be a master of artful and grand arrangement in the crowd scenes."

== Home media ==
The film has been released on DVD. In 2014, it was released on dual format Blu-ray and DVD as part of the Masters of Cinema series, accompanied by Als ich tot war (1916).
