= Land Without Women =

1929 film directed by Carmine Gallone

- Directed by: Carmine Gallone
- Written by: Peter Bolt (novel); Ladislaus Vajda
- Produced by: Hermann Fellner; Josef Somlo; Arnold Pressburger
- Starring: Conrad Veidt; Elga Brink; Clifford McLaglen; Grete Berger
- Cinematography: Otto Kanturek; Bruno Timm
- Edited by: Jean Oser
- Music by: Wolfgang Zeller
- Production company: Felsom Film
- Distributed by: Tobis Film (Germany)
- Release date: 30 September 1929
- Running time: 118 minutes
- Country: Germany
- Language: German

Land Without Women (German: Das Land ohne Frauen) is a 1929 German lost drama film directed by Carmine Gallone and starring Conrad Veidt, Elga Brink and Clifford McLaglen. It was based on the novel Die Braut Nr. 68 by Peter Bolt. The film is set amongst a community of gold diggers in Western Australia. It was shot at the Staaken and Templehof Studios in Berlin with sets designed by the art directors Hans Sohnle and Otto Erdmann. It was made by the small independent production company Felsom Film using the Tri-Ergon sound-on-film process, the first full-length German-speaking sound film to be released. It was followed a month later by the first all-talking film Atlantik, which had been made in Britain.

== Cast ==
- Conrad Veidt as Dick Ashton
- Elga Brink as Evelyne Bernheim
- Clifford McLaglen as Steve Parker
- Grete Berger as Ashton's mother
- Mathias Wieman as American Physician
- Ernő Verebes as O'Donegan, goldminer in Coolgardie
- Erwin Faber as Jim Sleigh, goldminer
- Carla Bartheel as Mary Dawson
- Boris de Fast as Captain of Hastings
- Kurt Vespermann as Joe Smith, Hastings steward
- Charles Puffy as Dirt-covered man
- Kurt Katch as Goldminer
- Robert Colléy as unnamed Ethiopian beggar

== See also ==
- List of early sound feature films (1926–1929)

== Bibliography ==
- Bock, Hans-Michael; Bergfelder, Tim, eds. (2009). The Concise Cinegraph: Encyclopaedia of German Cinema. New York: Berghahn Books. ISBN 978-1-57181-655-9.
- Hardt, Ursula (1996). From Caligari to California: Erich Pommer's Life in the International Film Wars. Providence: Berghahn Books. ISBN 978-1-57181-930-7.
