= A Modern Dubarry =

1927 film

- A scene featuring future star Marlene Dietrich.
- German: Eine Dubarry von heute
- Directed by: Alexander Korda
- Written by: Lajos Bíró
- Produced by: Hermann Fellner; Josef Somlo
- Starring: María Corda; Alfred Abel; Friedrich Kayßler
- Cinematography: Fritz Arno Wagner
- Music by: Werner R. Heymann
- Production company: Felsom Film
- Distributed by: UFA
- Release date: 10 January 1927
- Country: Germany
- Languages: Silent; German intertitles

A Modern Dubarry (German: Eine Dubarry von heute) is a 1927 German silent drama film directed by Alexander Korda and starring María Corda, Alfred Abel and Friedrich Kayßler. The title is a reference to the life of the eighteenth century courtesan Madame Du Barry. It was made by Felsom Film and distributed by the major studio UFA. Location shooting took place on the French Riviera. The film's sets were designed by the art director Oscar Friedrich Werndorff. It features performances from Hans Albers and Marlene Dietrich both of whom later achieved greater fame.

== Synopsis ==
A young woman working at a dressmakers rises to become a model and entertainer before falling in love with a King.

== Cast ==
- María Corda as Toinette
- Alfred Abel as Sillon
- Friedrich Kayßler as Cornelius Corbett
- Gyula Szőreghy as Gen. Padilla
- Jean Bradin as King Sandor
- Hans Albers as Toinette's first lover
- Alfred Gerasch as Graf Rabbatz
- Albert Paulig as Clairet
- Hans Wassmann as Theater Director
- Karl Platen as Diener
- Eugen Burg as Levaseur
- Marlene Dietrich as Kokotte
- Hilde Radney as Juliette
- Julia Serda as Tante Julie
- Hedwig Wangel as Rosalie
- Lotte Lorring as Mannequin

== Bibliography ==
- Kulik, Karol. Alexander Korda: The Man who Could Work Miracles. Virgin Books, 1990.
