= Mathilde Sussin =

Austrian actress

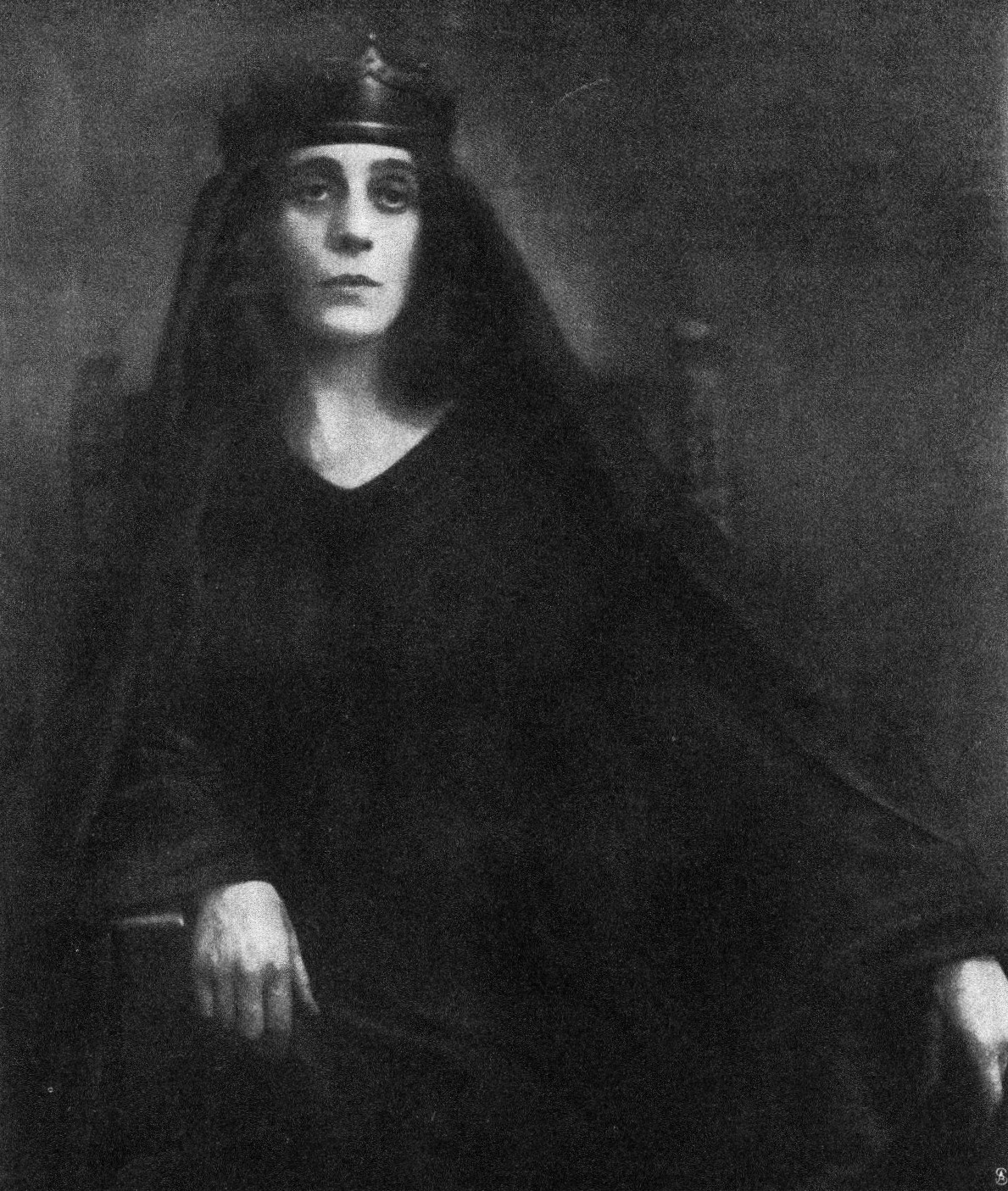
- Born: 21 September 1876; Vienna, Austria-Hungary
- Died: 2 August 1943 (aged 66); Theresienstadt concentration camp, Protectorate of Bohemia and Moravia
- Occupation: Actress
- Years active: 1896–1933

Mathilde Sussin (21 September 1876 – 2 August 1943) was an Austrian actress.

Sussin was born in Vienna into a Jewish family and died in 1943 at Theresienstadt concentration camp in the Protectorate of Bohemia and Moravia (German-occupied Czechoslovakia).

== Selected filmography ==
- The Black Tulip Festival (1920)
- To the Ladies' Paradise (1922)
- Das Haus ohne Lachen (1923)
- Die Buddenbrooks (1923)
- I.N.R.I. (1923)
- His Wife, The Unknown (1923)
- Tragedy in the House of Habsburg (1924)
- A Free People (1925)
- A Waltz-Dream (1925)
- The Woman Who Did (1925)
- Vater werden ist nicht schwer... (1926)
- People to Each Other (1926)
- One Does Not Play with Love (1926)
- The Famous Woman (1927)
- The Glass Boat (1927)
- U-9 Weddigen (1927)
- Assassination (1927)
- Violantha (1928)
- The Saint and Her Fool (1928)
- Refuge (1928)
- The Fourth from the Right (1929)
- Spring Awakening (1929)
- A Tango for You (1930)
- Flachsmann the Educator (1930)
- The Blue of Heaven (1932)
- The First Right of the Child (1932)

== Bibliography ==
- Eisner, Lotte H. The Haunted Screen: Expressionism in the German Cinema and the Influence of Max Reinhardt. University of California Press, 2008.
