= Otto Schmöle =

German actor

Otto Schmöle (1890 – 1968) was a German actor.

== Filmography ==
Year	Title	Role	Notes
1922	The Daughter of the Brigadier		
1922	The Marquis of Bolibar	Salignac	
1924	Everybody's Woman	Philipp Thun	
1924	Vier Nächte einer schönen Frau		
1925	The Curse	Torwächter	
1925	A Waltz by Strauss	Mann im Frack	
1926	Franz Schuberts letzte Liebe	Paganini	
1927	Seine Hoheit, der Eintänzer	Polizeikommissar	
1927	The Family without Morals	Josef Meisl	
1928	Der Geliebte seiner Frau	Taschendieb Stieglitz	
1929	The Midnight Waltz		
1929	Little Veronica		
1931	Purpur und Waschblau	Der Polizeipräfekt	
1932	Lumpenkavaliere	Generaldirektor	
1933	Invisible Opponent		
1934	Spring Parade	Der Adjutant	Uncredited
1934	Frasquita		
1935	Leutnant Bobby, der Teufelskerl		
1935	Buchhalter Schnabel	Der Syndikus	
1939	Linen from Ireland	Nagel	
1940	Das jüngste Gericht		
1941	Oh, diese Männer	Polizeikommissar	
1942	Whom the Gods Love		
1948	Der Prozeß	Prussian, Gast im Hause Solymosi	
1948	Gottes Engel sind überall	Hugo	
1948	Der Herr Kanzleirat		
1949	Duel with Death	Präsident des deutschen Feldkriegsgerichts	
1949	Mysterious Shadows	Präsident Ries	
1952	Ich hab' mich so an Dich gewöhnt	Herr von Prittwitz, Hotelgast	
1955	The Last Ten Days	Generaloberst Alfred Jodl	
1955	Gasparone	Cavalaliero	
1955	Sonnenschein und Wolkenbruch		
1956	Wilhelm Tell	Walter Fürst	
1957	Die Lindenwirtin vom Donaustrand	Dicker Herr	
1958	Die Landärztin vom Tegernsee		
1959	Maria Stuart		
1960	Herr Puntila and His Servant Matti	Richter	
1960	The Good Soldier Schweik	Generalmajor von Schwarzenberg	Uncredited
1962	Adorable Julia	Albert, Chauffeur bei Gosselyns	
1962	He Can't Stop Doing It	Lord Bannister	
1963	With Best Regards	Fohnsheim, Bankpräsident	

== Bibliography ==
- Kulik, Karol. Alexander Korda: The Man Who Could Work Miracles. Virgin Books, 1990.
