= Two on a Vacation =

- Spanish poster
- Directed by: Carlo Ludovico Bragaglia
- Written by: Carlo Ludovico Bragaglia; Aldo De Benedetti; Ernst Marischka; Maria Teresa Ricci
- Produced by: Giuseppe Gallia
- Starring: Vittorio De Sica; María Denis; Umberto Melnati
- Cinematography: Anchise Brizzi
- Edited by: Mario Serandrei
- Music by: Giovanni Fusco
- Production company: Atlas Film
- Distributed by: Industrie Cinematografiche Italiane
- Release date: 7 March 1940
- Running time: 78 minutes
- Country: Italy
- Language: Italian

Two on a Vacation (Italian: Pazza di gioia) is a 1940 Italian comedy film directed by Carlo Ludovico Bragaglia and starring Vittorio De Sica, María Denis, and Umberto Melnati. It was a remake of the 1932 German film Two in a Car. It was shot at the Cinecittà Studios in Rome.

The film's sets were designed by Gastone Medin.

== Cast ==
- Vittorio De Sica as Il conte Corrado Valli
- María Denis as Liliana Casali
- Umberto Melnati as Aroldo Bianchi
- Paolo Stoppa as Alvaro Monteiro, il capo reparto della ditta Do-re-mi
- Enzo Biliotti as Peppino, il maggiordome del conte
- Rosetta Tofano as Rosetta, la moglie di Peppino
- Giuseppe Pierozzi as Il principale della ditta Do-re-mi
- Marcella Melnati as Rosalia
- Luigi Erminio D'Olivo as Il direttore d'orchestra
- Olga von Kollar as Giulia
- Aristide Garbini as Il proprietario della trattoria
- Renato Malavasi as Un barbiere
- Alfredo Martinelli as Il signore con la barba rasata a metà

== See also ==
- Two in a Car (1932)
- Companion Wanted (1932)

== Bibliography ==
- James Monaco. The Encyclopedia of Film. Perigee Books, 1991.
