= Gustav Czimeg =

German actor (1877–1939)

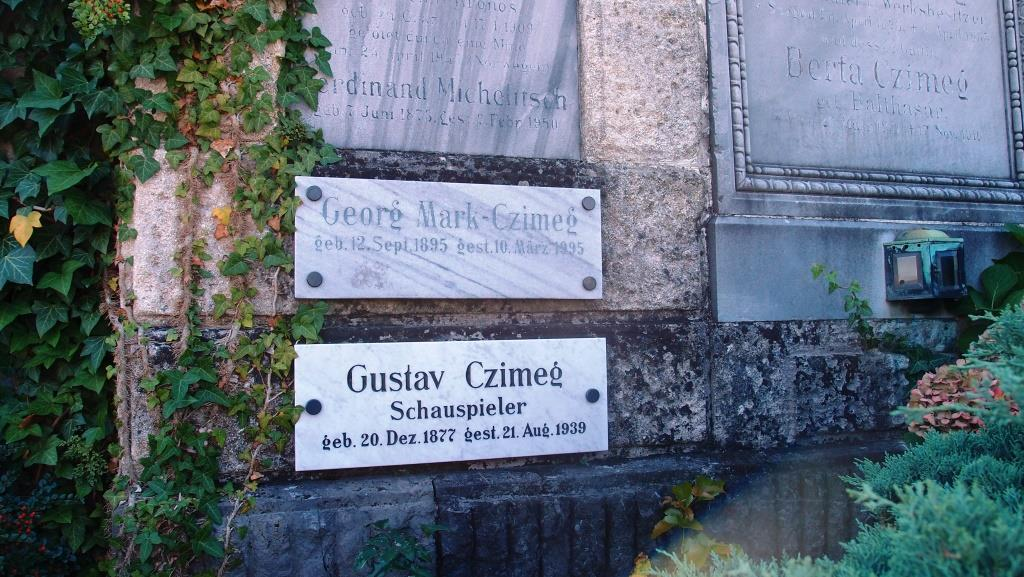
Grave of Gustav Czimeg at Steinfeldfriedhof in Graz, Austria

Gustav Czimeg (20 December 1877 – 21 August 1939) was a German actor of the silent period. He appeared in films such as Madame Dubarry (1919), in which he played Duke Aiguillon, Die Rache des Titanen (1919), Glasprinzessin (1921), and One Does Not Play with Love (1926).
