= Bruno Timm =

German cinematographer

Bruno Timm (10 June 1902, in Berlin – 15 December 1972) was a German cinematographer.

== Selected filmography ==
- Destiny (1921)
- Wrath of the Seas (1926)
- The Woman on the Rack (1928)
- Land Without Women (1929)
- Die kleine Veronika (1929)
- Storm in a Water Glass (1931)
- Girls to Marry (1932)
- Modern Dowry (1932)
- The Escape to Nice (1932)
- The Tsar's Diamond (1932)
- Two in a Car (1932)
- All for Love (1933)
- A Song for You (1933)
- The Tsarevich (1933)
- Must We Get Divorced? (1933)
- Bashful Felix (1934)
- Between Two Hearts (1934)
- The Four Musketeers (1934)
- Heaven on Earth (1935)
- Forget Me Not (1935)
- Königstiger (1935)
- Game on Board (1936)
- Men, Animals and Sensations (1938)
- Search for Majora (1949)
- Madonna in Chains (1949)
- The Tiger Akbar (1951)
- Rose of the Mountain (1952)
- Lady's Choice (1953)
- Love's Awakening (1953)
- Dutch Girl (1953)
- The Charming Young Lady (1953)
- Josef the Chaste (1953)
- The Beautiful Miller (1954)
- Liane, Jungle Goddess (1956)
- It Happened Only Once (1958)

== Bibliography ==
- Jung, Uli & Schatzberg, Walter. Beyond Caligari: The Films of Robert Wiene. Berghahn Books, 1999.
