= The Famous Woman =

1927 film directed by Robert Wiene

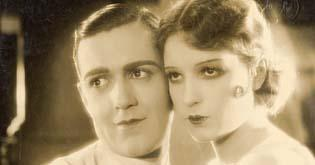
- Fred Solm and Lili Damita
- Directed by: Robert Wiene
- Written by: Melchior Lengyel (play and screenplay)
- Produced by: Hermann Fellner; Josef Somlo; Arnold Pressburger
- Starring: Lili Damita; Fred Solm; Warwick Ward; Lissy Arna
- Cinematography: Otto Kanturek
- Music by: Walter Ulfig
- Distributed by: Deutsche Lichtspiel-Syndikat
- Release date: 29 October 1927
- Country: Germany
- Languages: Silent; German intertitles

The Famous Woman (German: Die berühmte Frau) is a 1927 German silent drama film directed by Robert Wiene and starring Lili Damita, Fred Solm and Warwick Ward. It was based on the play Die Tänzerin by Melchior Lengyel, who also wrote the film's screenplay. While performing in Barcelona, a dancer falls in love with a Spanish aristocrat. He proposes marriage to her providing she give up her profession. She agrees and the wedding preparations begin. When her troupe returns to Spain, however, she is drawn back to her true calling as a dancer and her aristocratic lover reluctantly allows her to go free. Damita's performance was particularly praised, as was the cinematography of Otto Kanturek who had done location shooting in Barcelona.

== Cast ==
- Lili Damita as Sonja Litowskaja
- Fred Solm as Alfredo de Cavalcante
- Warwick Ward as Gerald
- Lissy Arna as Zofe bei Sonja
- Alexander Granach as Diener bei Alfredo
- Arnold Korff as Der Herzog v. Olivarez
- Mathilde Sussin as Mutter des Alfredo
- Alexander Murski as Vater des Alfredo
- Nikolaus von Lovrie

== Bibliography ==
- Jung, Uli; Schatzberg, Walter (1999). Beyond Caligari: The Films of Robert Wiene. Berghahn Books. ISBN 9781571811561.
