= It Was Me =

1936 film

- Directed by: Arthur Bárdos
- Written by: Rózsi Meller (play); Jenõ Szatmári
- Produced by: Ferenc Hegedüs
- Starring: Elma Bulla; Jenö Törzs; Mici Erdélyi
- Cinematography: István Eiben
- Edited by: József Szilas
- Music by: Andor Komáromy
- Production company: Pallas Film
- Release date: 8 October 1936
- Running time: 84 minutes
- Country: Hungary
- Language: Hungarian

It Was Me (Hungarian: Én voltam) is a 1936 Hungarian drama film directed by Arthur Bárdos and starring Elma Bulla, Jenö Törzs and Mici Erdélyi. The film's sets were designed by the art director Márton Vincze. It premiered at the 1936 Venice Film Festival.

== Cast ==
- Elma Bulla as Huber Wanda
- Jenö Törzs as Köhler Ervin mérnök
- Mici Erdélyi as Mici
- Tivadar Uray as Bornemann mérnök
- Ferenc Kiss as Dr. Mödlinger
- Piroska Vaszary as Dubrovitzné
- Jenõ Szigeti as Dubrovitz
- Gyula Csortos as Elmeszakértõ
- Lajos Boray as Dr. Theodor
- György Gonda as Irodaszolga
- Lajos Csele as Rendõrgyakornok
- Elemér Baló as Bruckner Ottó
- Magda Kálmán as Dr. Theodor titkárnõje

== Bibliography ==
- Frey, David. Jews, Nazis and the Cinema of Hungary: The Tragedy of Success, 1929-1944. Bloomsbury Publishing, 2017.
- Juhász, István. Kincses magyar filmtár 1931-1944: az eredeti forgatókönyvből 1931 és 1944 között létrejött hazai mozgóképekről. Kráter, 2007.
- Rîpeanu, Bujor. (ed.) International Directory of Cinematographers, Set- and Costume Designers in Film: Hungary (from the beginnings to 1988). Saur, 1981.
