= Josef Somlo =

Hungarian film producer

- Born: 5 October 1884; Pápa, Austro-Hungarian Empire
- Died: 29 November 1973 (aged 89); Locarno, Switzerland
- Occupation: Film Producer
- Years active: 1922 - 1958

Josef Somlo (1884–1973) was a Hungarian film producer. Following the Nazi takeover in Germany, where he had worked for a number of years, Somlo went into exile in Britain. During his German period he was associated with Hermann Fellner with whom he co-produced a number of films for their Felsom Film company.

== Partial filmography ==
- Sins of Yesterday (1922)
- Dancing Mad (1925)
- One Does Not Play with Love (1926)
- Unmarried Daughters (1926)
- The Ghost Train (1927)
- The Famous Woman (1927)
- A Modern Dubarry (1927)
- The Great Adventuress (1928)
- The Bold Dragoon (1928)
- Odette (1928)
- Number 17 (1928)
- The Woman on the Rack (1928)
- Strauss Is Playing Today (1928)
- Land Without Women (1929)
- The Fourth from the Right (1929)
- The Wrecker (1929)
- Storm in a Water Glass (1931)
- Three Days of Love (1931)
- Tell Me Tonight (1932)
- Girls to Marry (1932)
- The Arsenal Stadium Mystery (1939)
- Old Bill and Son (1941)
- Uncle Silas (1947)
- The Man Who Loved Redheads (1955)
- Behind the Mask (1958)

== Bibliography ==
- Bergfelder, Tim & Cargnelli, Christian. Destination London: German-speaking emigrés and British cinema, 1925–1950. Berghahn Books, 2008.
- Prawer, S.S. Between Two Worlds: The Jewish Presence in German and Austrian Film, 1910-1933. Berghahn Books, 2007.
