= U-9 Weddigen =

1927 film

- Directed by: Heinz Paul
- Written by: Willy Rath
- Produced by: Hanns Otto
- Starring: Carl de Vogt; Mathilde Sussin; Fritz Alberti
- Cinematography: Willy Goldberger
- Production company: Johannisthaler Filmanstalten
- Release date: 5 May 1927
- Running time: 97 minutes
- Country: Germany
- Languages: Silent; German intertitles

U-9 Weddigen is a 1927 German silent war film directed by Heinz Paul and starring Carl de Vogt, Mathilde Sussin and Fritz Alberti. The film is based on the exploits of the submarine SM U-9 under the command of Otto Weddigen during the First World War. It is similar in theme to the previous year's Our Emden, which also depicted the Imperial German Navy in heroic terms.

It was shot at the Johannisthal Studios in Berlin. The film's sets were designed by the art directors Karl Machus and Franz Schroedter.

== Cast ==
- Carl de Vogt as Weddingen
- Mathilde Sussin as Elisabeth Fuller
- Fritz Alberti as Elizabeth Fullers Gatte
- Fred Solm as Percy
- Gerd Briese as Gerhard v. Dietrischsen
- Ernst Hofmann as Fritz
- Hella Moja as Hilde
- Hans Mierendorff as Fritzs Onkel
- Hanne Brinkmann as Girl at Dietrichs
- Willy Mendau as Bursche von Oberleutnant Gerhard Dietrichs

== Bibliography ==
- Kester, Bernadette. Film Front Weimar: Representations of the First World War in German films of the Weimar Period (1919-1933). Amsterdam University Press, 2002.
