= Girls to Marry =

1932 film

- Directed by: Wilhelm Thiele
- Written by: István Zágon (play); Hans Jacoby; Franz Schulz; Henry Gilbert
- Produced by: Hermann Fellner; Josef Somlo
- Starring: Renate Müller; Hermann Thimig; Wolf Albach-Retty
- Cinematography: Otto Kanturek; Bruno Timm
- Music by: Michael Krausz
- Production company: Felsom Film
- Distributed by: Felsom Film
- Release date: 15 April 1932
- Running time: 102 minutes
- Country: Germany
- Language: German

Girls to Marry (German: Mädchen zum Heiraten) is a 1932 German romantic comedy film directed by Wilhelm Thiele and starring Renate Müller, Hermann Thimig and Wolf Albach-Retty. It was shot at the Babelsberg Studios in Berlin. The film's sets were designed by the art director Hans Jacoby. It was remade the same year in Britain as Marry Me, also directed by Wilhelm Thiele, with Müller starring again.

== Cast ==
- Renate Müller as Gerda Arnhold
- Hermann Thimig as Robert Goll
- Wolf Albach-Retty as Paul, sein Bruder
- Gustl Gstettenbaur as Willi, sein Bruder
- Fritz Grünbaum as Sigurd Bernstein, Heiratsvermittler
- Willi Grill as Meyer, sein Sekretär
- S.Z. Sakall as Alois Novak
- Gertrud Wolle as Frau Krause
- Oskar Sima as Direktor Korten
- Margita Alfvén
- Ilse Fürstenberg
- Else Ward
- Ludwig Donath
- Erich Dunskus
- Das Mikro Jazz und Konzert-Orchester as Orchester
- Melody Gents as Singer

== Bibliography ==
- Cook, Pam (1997). Gainsborough Pictures. Cassell. ISBN 978-0-304-33708-8.
