= One Does Not Play with Love =

1926 film

- Directed by: G. W. Pabst
- Written by: Willy Haas; Alfred de Musset (play)
- Produced by: Hermann Fellner; Arnold Pressburger; Josef Somlo
- Starring: Werner Krauss
- Cinematography: Robert Lach; Guido Seeber; Kurt Oertel
- Edited by: Georg Wilhelm Pabst
- Production company: FPS-Film
- Distributed by: Phoebus Film
- Release date: 10 November 1926
- Running time: 70 minutes
- Country: Weimar Republic
- Languages: Silent; German intertitles

One Does Not Play with Love (German: Man spielt nicht mit der Liebe) is a 1926 silent German drama film directed by G. W. Pabst. The film is an adaptation of the 1834 play by Alfred de Musset, On ne badine pas avec l'amour. The film is considered to be a lost film. It featured work by Guido Seeber.

== Cast ==
- Werner Krauss as Fürst Colalto (Prince Colalto)
- Lili Damita as Calixta
- Erna Morena as Florence, ehemalige Opernsängerin (alumna opera singer)
- Egon von Jordan as Eugen Lewis
- Artur Retzbach as Nepallek, Hofmobiliardirektor (Director of the furniture of the court) (as Artur Retzbach-Erasiny)
- Oreste Bilancia as Der Freund (the friend)
- Gustav Czimeg
- Tala Birell as Bit Role (as Thala Birell)
- Karl Etlinger
- Maria Paudler
- Mathilde Sussin

== See also ==
- List of lost films
