= The Wrecker (1929 film) =

1929 film by Géza von Bolváry

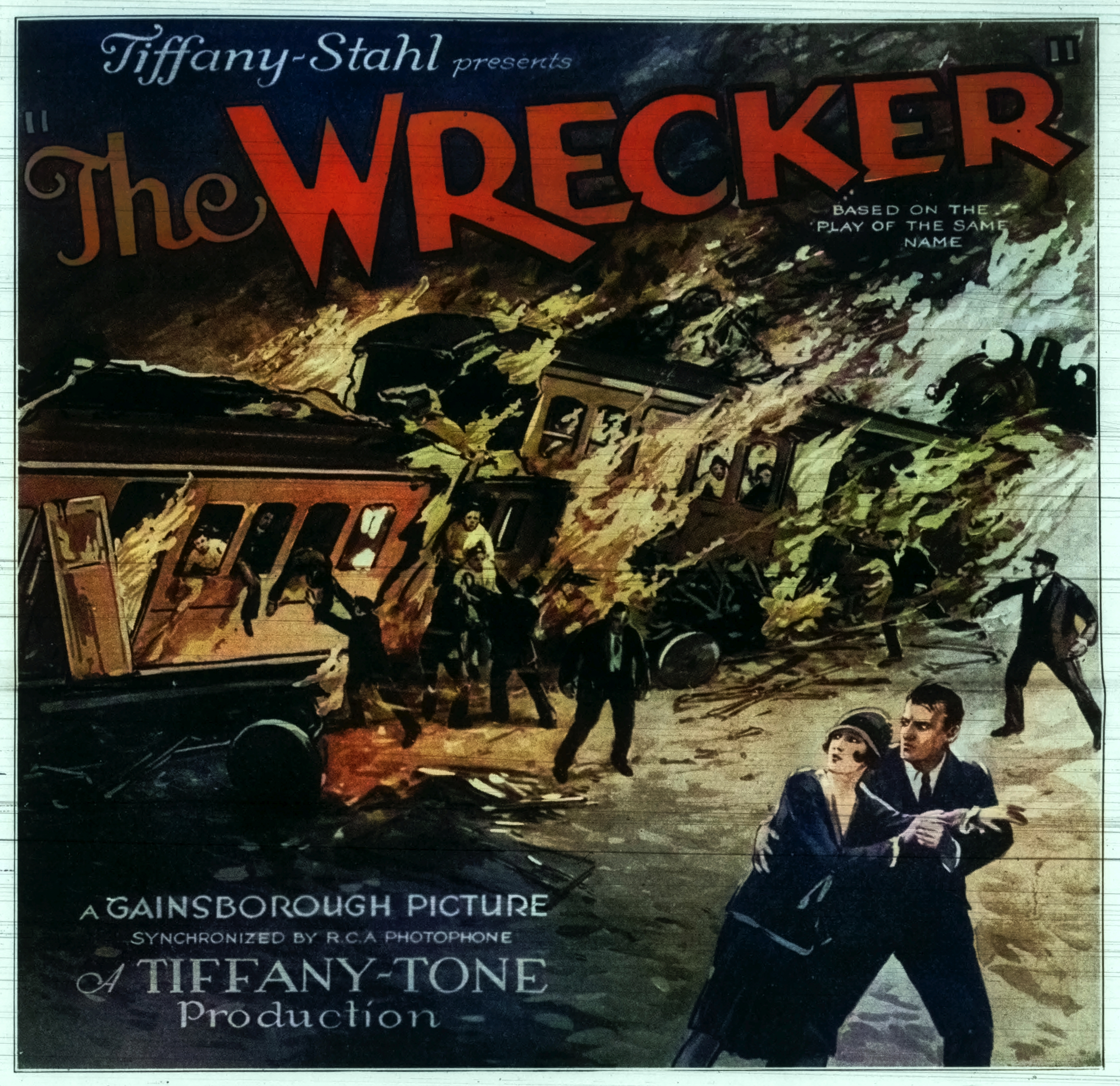
- Directed by: Géza von Bolváry
- Written by: Benno Vigny
- Based on: The Wrecker by: Arnold Ridley; Bernard Merivale
- Produced by: Michael Balcon; Hermann Fellner; Arnold Pressburger; Josef Somlo
- Starring: Carlyle Blackwell; Benita Hume; Joseph Striker; Winter Hall
- Cinematography: Otto Kanturek
- Edited by: Arthur Tavares
- Production companies: Gainsborough Pictures; Felsom Film
- Distributed by: Woolf & Freedman Film Service (UK); Universum Film AG (Germany); Tiffany Pictures (US)
- Release dates: 17 July 1929 (UK); 27 August 1929 (Germany)
- Running time: 74 minutes
- Countries: Germany; United Kingdom
- Languages: Sound (Part-Talkie); English/German Intertitles

The Wrecker (German: Der Würger) is a 1929 British-German sound crime film directed by Géza von Bolváry and starring Carlyle Blackwell, Joseph Striker, and Benita Hume. The sound version was a Part-Talkie prepared by Tiffany-Stahl Productions and was copyrighted by them in 1929 in the United States making the sound version public domain. The film has two short sequences with audible dialog at the start and towards the end of the film. The rest of the film features a synchronized musical score with sound effects. Tiffany-Stahl used the sound-on-film RCA Photophone process to record the soundtrack. The film was also issued on sound-on-disc format using Tiffany-Tone (Vitaphone-type) sound discs. The film was based on the play of the same title by Arnold Ridley. It was produced by Michael Balcon for Gainsborough Pictures in a co-production with the German firm Felsom Film.

== Plot ==
A criminal referred to by the press as "The Wrecker" is orchestrating accidents on Britain's railways. One such accident occurs on the (fictional) United Coast Lines Railway, whose train is carrying Roger Doyle (Joseph Striker), who has retired from cricket to work on the railway. Roger survives, and reports the accident to his uncle, Sir Gerald Bartlett (Winter Hall), the managing director of the railway, and his assistant, the sly Ambrose Barney (Carlyle Blackwell). Unbeknownst to them, Ambrose is The Wrecker, and is also the head of the Kyle Motor-Coach Company, whose buses are introduced on services where The Wrecker has struck, hoping to frighten passengers off of the trains and onto buses. When Sir Gerald becomes suspicious of Ambrose following yet another accident, he is shot dead.

After receiving a tip-off from one of Ambrose's employees, Roger and bumbling detective Ramesses Ratchett (Leonard Thompson) foil another planned accident, much to the delight of the press. Ambrose, enraged at being foiled, plans another accident, but his conversation is recorded onto a wax cylinder by Roger and his girlfriend, Mary Shelton (Benita Hume), Sir Gerald's secretary who had been on the train that Roger had saved from disaster. On hearing the wax cylinder that exposes his crimes, Ambrose shoots the phonograph, destroying the cylinder, and flees from Roger and Mary, only to find himself on the very train that is to be wrecked. Ambrose holds Roger at gunpoint, but is attacked from behind by Mary and subdued (possibly dead since he jumps from the moving train) and the train is brought to a safe halt. With Ambrose defeated, Roger and Mary profess their love for each other, disappearing in a cloud of steam as the train reverses away.

== Cast ==
- Carlyle Blackwell as Ambrose Barney
- Benita Hume as Mary Shelton
- Joseph Striker as Roger Doyle
- Winter Hall as Sir Gerald Bartlett
- Gordon Harker as William
- Pauline Johnson as Beryl Matchley

== Music ==
The musical score for the film was composed by Irvin Talbot. The orchestra was directed by Emanuel Baer. The film featured a theme song entitled "Are You Really Mine?" which was composed by Joseph H. Santly and Irving Caesar.

== Production ==
The crash scene was filmed at Herriard on the Basingstoke and Alton Light Railway. A set of SECR coaches and F1 class locomotive No. A148 were released on an incline to collide into a Foden steam lorry. The impact, which destroyed the locomotive and the lorry, was recorded by 23 cameras and has been described as "the most spectacular rail crash in cinema history."

== Restoration ==
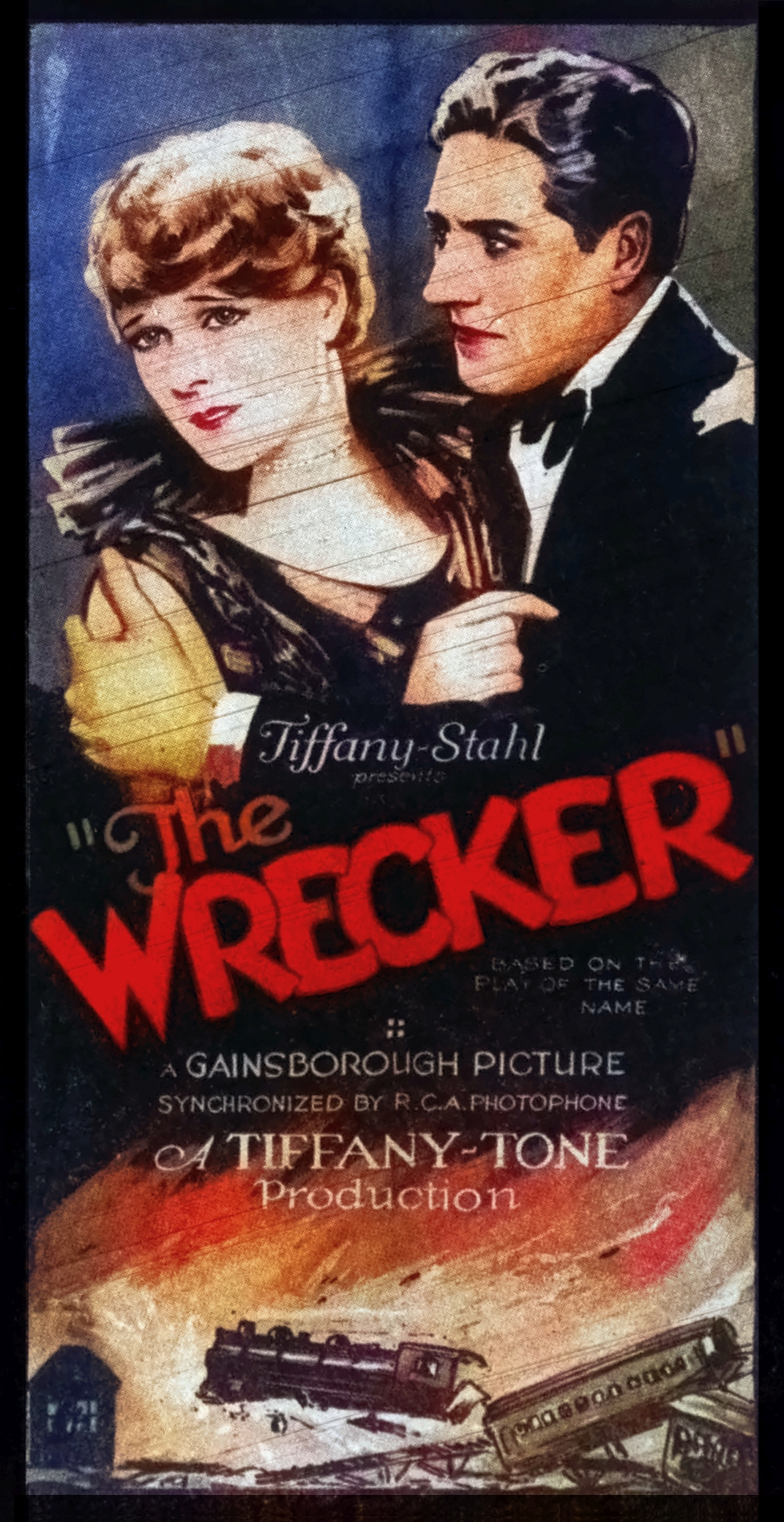
Poster for the 1929 Part-Talkie Film The Wrecker

The sound public domain version of the film was restored by The Vitaphone Soundtrack Project in 2025 and place on the Internet Archive and YouTube. This is the version that the majority of American audiences saw in 1929. Many British cinemas had not yet been wired for sound and presented the silent version.

The 2009 DVD uses a mute print which has a newly composed score by the composer Neil Brand. The original musical score is said to have been removed because it had been prepared by Tiffany Pictures, the American film studio, and this sound version had become public domain.

On 26 November 2009 the film was launched at a special screening at the Watercress Line, a heritage railway close to where the filming took place.

== See also ==
- List of early sound feature films (1926–1929)

== Bibliography ==
- Cook, Pam, ed. (1997). Gainsborough Pictures. London: Cassell. ISBN 978-0-304-33708-8.
- Low, Rachael; Manvell, Roger (1971). The History of the British Film, 1918–1929. London: Allen & Unwin. ISBN 978-0-04-791021-0.
- Bergfelder, Tim; Cargnelli, Christian, eds. (2008). Destination London: German-Speaking Emigrés and British Cinema, 1925–1950. New York: Berghahn Books. ISBN 978-0-85745-019-7.
