= The Fourth from the Right =

1929 film

- Directed by: Conrad Wiene
- Written by: Walter Supper; Hans Wilhelm
- Produced by: Hermann Fellner; Josef Somlo
- Starring: Ossi Oswalda; Betty Bird; Arthur Pusey
- Cinematography: Axel Graatkjær
- Production company: Felsom Film
- Distributed by: Deutsche Fox
- Release date: 4 February 1929
- Country: Germany
- Languages: Silent; German intertitles

The Fourth from the Right (German: Die vierte von rechts) is a 1929 German silent comedy film directed by Conrad Wiene and starring Ossi Oswalda, Betty Bird and Arthur Pusey. The film's sets were designed by the art director Emil Hasler. It was released by the German subsidiary of Fox Film.

== Cast ==
- Ossi Oswalda as Josyane
- Betty Bird as Betty
- Arthur Pusey as Lord Douglas Blandford
- Adolphe Engers as Bob Murphy
- Albert Paulig
- Gustav Püttjer
- Fritz Spira
- Mathilde Sussin
- Otto Wallburg

== Bibliography ==
- Frank-Burkhard Habel. Verrückt vor Begehren.: Die Filmdiven aus der Stummfilmzeit. Ein leidenschaftlicher Blick zurück in die Zeit der ersten Stars.. Schwarzkopf und Schwarzkopf, 1999.
