= Gerhard Zwerenz =

German writer and politician (1925-2015)

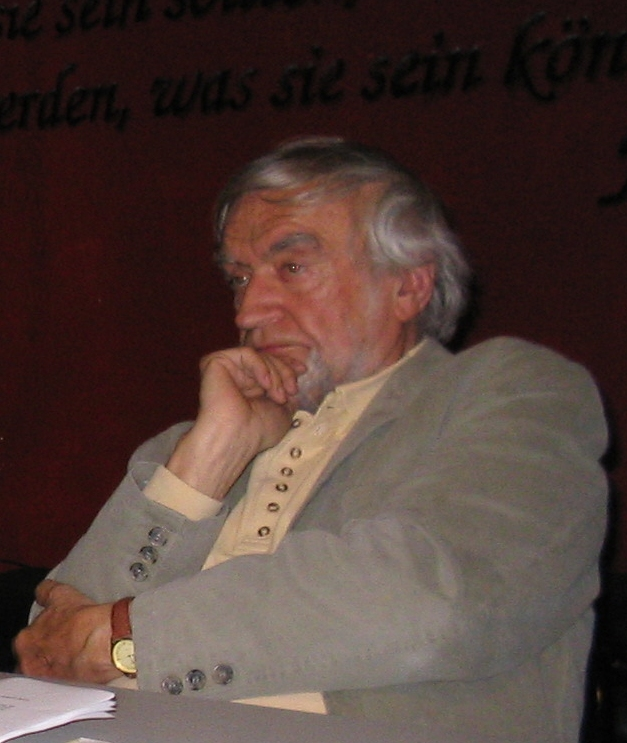
- Born: 3 June 1925; Gablenz, Saxony, Germany
- Died: 13 July 2015 (aged 90); Oberreifenberg, Hesse, Germany
- Occupations: Writer and politician
- Spouse: Ingrid Hoffmann
- Children: 1

Gerhard Zwerenz (3 June 1925 in Gablenz, Saxony – 13 July 2015) was a German writer and politician. From 1994 until 1998 he was a member of the Bundestag for the Party of Democratic Socialism (PDS).

== Life ==
Gerhard Zwerenz was born in Gablenz, a district of Crimmitschau. Through his father, he is a great-great-grandnephew to Mizzi Zwerenz. After an apprenticeship to a coppersmith he enlisted in the Wehrmacht in 1942 and participated in World War II. In 1944 he deserted and became a prisoner of war.

In 1948 he came back to Germany, where he worked as a policeman until 1951. From 1949 until 1957 he was member of the Socialist Unity Party of Germany. After he became ill with tuberculosis he had to stay in a sanatorium. From 1953 until 1956 he studied philosophy under Ernst Bloch at Leipzig University. From 1956 up until his death in 2015 he worked as a writer. In 1957 Zwerenz was expelled from the SED and soon after fled to West-Berlin. Later he and his wife, writer Ingrid Zwerenz, lived in Munich, Cologne, Offenbach am Main and Oberreifenberg/Schmitten im Taunus.

From 1994 until 1998 Zwerenz was a member of the Bundestag for the PDS.

Zwerenz died on 13 July 2015, aged 90.

== Selected works ==
- 1956: Aristotelische und Brechtsche Dramatik. Versuch einer ästhetischen Wertung (Essays) (Greifen, Rudolstadt)
- 1956: Magie, Sternenglaube, Spiritismus, Streifzüge durch den Aberglauben (Urania, Leipzig)
- 1959: Die Liebe der toten Männer (Kiepenheuer & Witsch, Köln)
- 1959: Aufs Rad geflochten. Roman vom Aufstieg der neuen Klasse (Kiepenheuer & Witsch, Köln)
- 1961: Ärgernisse – Von der Maas bis an die Memel (Essays) (Kiepenheuer & Witsch, Köln)
- 1962: Gesänge auf dem Markt. Satiren und phantastische Geschichten (Kiepenheuer & Witsch, Köln)
- 1962: Wider die deutschen Tabus (Polemik) (List, München)
- 1962: Nicht alles gefallen lassen. Schulbuchgeschichten (Fischer TB, Frankfurt)
- 1964: Heldengedenktag. Dreizehn Versuche in Prosa, eine ehrerbietige Haltung einzunehmen (Scherz, München)
- 1966: Casanova oder der Kleine Herr in Krieg und Frieden (Roman) Scherz, München (1975 als Taschenbuch bei dtv, München)
- 1968: Vom Nutzen des dicken Fells und andere Geschichten (Wilhelm Goldmann, München)
- 1968: Erbarmen mit den Männern. Roman vom Aschermittwochsfest und den sieben Sinnlichkeiten (Scherz, München)
- 1969: Die Lust am Sozialismus (Heinrich-Heine, Frankfurt)
- 1970: Leslie Markwart (d.i. G. Z.): Die Zukunft der Männer (Olympia Press, Frankfurt)
- 1970: Peer Tarrok (d.i. G. Z.): Rasputin (Joseph Melzer Zero Press, Darmstadt)
- 1971: Kopf und Bauch. Die Geschichte eines Arbeiters, der unter die Intellektuellen gefallen ist (Fischer, Frankfurt)
- 1972: Der plebejische Intellektuelle (Frankfurt)
- 1972: Bericht aus dem Landesinneren. City. Strecke. Siedlung (S. Fischer Verlag, Frankfurt)
- 1973: Die Erde ist unbewohnbar wie der Mond (S. Fischer Verlag, Frankfurt)
- 1974: Der Widerspruch. Autobiographischer Bericht (Frankfurt)
- 1975: Die Quadriga des Mischa Wolf (S. Fischer Verlag, Frankfurt)
- 1975: Vorbereitungen zur Hochzeit. Erzählungen (Fischer Taschenbuch, Frankfurt)
- 1977: Die Westdeutschen. Erfahrungen, Beschreibungen, Analysen (C. Bertelsmann, München)
- 1977: Wozu das ganze Theater. Lustige Geschichten von Schauspielern, Verlegern, von Frankfurt, seiner Buchmesse und vom lieben schönen Tod (Verlag R.S. Schulz, Percha u. Kempfenhausen)
- 1978: Das Grosselternkind (Beltz & Gelberg, Weinheim)
- 1978: Die schrecklichen Folgen der Legende, ein Liebhaber gewesen zu sein. Erotische Geschichten (Wilhelm Goldmann, München)
- 1979: Kurt Tucholsky. Biographie eines guten Deutschen (Bertelsmann, München)
- 1979: Die Ehe der Maria Braun (Wilhelm Goldmann, München)
- 1979: Ein fröhliches Leben in der Wüste. Roman einer Reise durch drei Tage und drei Nächte (R.S. Schulz, Percha u. Kempfenhausen)
- 1980: Die Geschäfte des Herrn Morgenstern (Universitas, München) (1984 edition at Moewig, Rastatt)
- 1980: Eine Liebe in Schweden. Roman vom seltsamen Spiel und Tod des Satirikers K. T. (Wilhelm Goldmann, München)
- 1980: Salut für einen alten Poeten (Wilhelm Goldmann, München)
- 1980: Der Mann und das Mädchen (Moewig, München)
- 1980: Rohes Muster. In: Kritik der Tierversuche. Kübler Verlag, Lambertheim 1980, ISBN 3-921265-24-X, S. 37–40.
- 1981: Wir haben jetzt Ruhe in Deutschland (Hoffmann & Campe, Hamburg)
- 1981: Il matrimonio di Maria Braun (Translation from German edition 1979) (Rizzoli Editore, Milano)
- 1981: Der chinesische Hund (Roman) (Wilhelm Goldmann, München)
- 1981: Die 25. Stunde der Liebe (Roman) (Wilhelm Goldmann, München)
- 1981: Das Konzept des plebejischen Intellektuellen
- 1981: Die lang verlorenen Gefühle (Moewig, München)
- 1981: Die Freiheit einer Frau (Moewig, München)
- 1981: Der Mann, der seinen Bruder rächte (Moewig, München)
- 1981: Schöne Geschichten. Erotische Streifzüge (Wilhelm Goldmann, München)
- 1981: Ungezogene Geschichten (Wilhelm Goldmann, München)
- 1981: Wüste Geschichten von Liebe und Tod. Erotische Erzählungen (Wilhelm Goldmann, München)
- 1982: Der langsame Tod des Rainer Werner Fassbinder. Ein Bericht (Schneekluth, Münchner Edition, München)
- 1982: Venus auf dem Vulkan (März Verlag, Berlin & Schlechterwegen)
- 1982: Abschied von den Mädchen (Arthur Moewig, Rastatt)
- 1982: Der Mann und die Wilde (Arthur Moewig, Rastatt)
- 1982: Antwort an einen Friedensfreund oder längere Epistel für Stephan Hermlin und meinen Hund (Bund, Köln)
- 1982: Auf den Tod ist kein Verlass. Erotischer Thriller (Wilhelm Goldmann, München)
- 1983: Der Bunker (Roman) (Schneekluth, München)
- 1983: Der Sex-Knigge. Erotische Spiele über und unter der Bettdecke (with Ingrid Zwerenz) (Delphin, München)
- 1983: Schöne Niederlagen. Wie Stories entstehen, und Weltuntergänge (Brennglas, Assenheim)
- 1983: Berührungen. Geschichten vom Eros des 20. Jahrhunderts (Knaur, München)
- 1983: Erotische Kalendergeschichten (12 Bände) (Wilhelm Goldmann, München)
- 1984: Reise unter die Haut (Knaur, München)
- 1984: Die Tierschutz-Lady (Moewig, Rastatt)
- 1984: Das Lachbuch (Gütersloh)
- 1984: Lachen, Liebe, Laster. Erotische Stories (Wilhelm Goldmann, München)
- 1985: Die Venusharfe. Liebeslieder, Zorngedichte, Knittelverse (Knaur, München)
- 1985: Die DDR wird Kaiserreich. Thriller (Bastei, Bergisch Gladbach)
- 1985: Langsamer deutscher Walzer. Thriller (Bastei, Bergisch Gladbach)
- 1986: Frisches Blut und alte Krieger. Thriller (Bastei, Bergisch Gladbach)
- 1986: Peepshow für den Kommissar. Thriller (Bastei, Bergisch Gladbach)
- 1986: Die Rückkehr des toten Juden nach Deutschland (Max Hueber, München)
- 1988: "Soldaten sind Mörder". Die Deutschen und der Krieg (Knesebeck & Schuler, München)
- 1989: Vergiß die Träume Deiner Jugend nicht (Rasch und Röhring, Hamburg)
- 1991: Der Alternative Büchnerpreis 1991 (H.L. Schlapp, Darmstadt)
- 1991: Der legitime Krieg? (Zimmermann, Berlin)
- 1993: Rechts und dumm (Carlsen, Hamburg)
- 1994: Links und lahm. Die Linke stirbt, doch sie ergibt sich nicht (Carlsen, Hamburg)
- 1994: Die neue Weltordnung (Zimmermann, Berlin)
- 1996: Das Großelternkind (edited as "Ausgabe letzter Hand"; 1978) (Dingsda, Querfurt)
- 1997: Die Antworten des Herrn Z. oder Vorsicht, nur für Intellektuelle Published by Ingrid Zwerenz and Joachim Jahns. Additional material: Freunde und Feinde über Zwerenz (Dingsda, Querfurt)
- 1998: Unendliche Wende. Ein Streitgespräch (mit Hermann Kant) Hg. Joachim Jahns (Dingsda, Querfurt)
- 1999: Die grundsätzliche Differenz. Ein Streitgespräch in Wort und Schrift (with Sahra Wagenknecht) [moderated by: Christa Gießler] (Dingsda, Querfurt)
- 2000: Gute Witwen weinen nicht. Exil. Lieben. Tod. Die letzten Jahre Kurt Tucholskys (Kranichsteiner Literaturverlag) (First edition 1980 as Eine Liebe in Schweden)
- 2000: Krieg im Glashaus oder Der Bundestag als Windmühle. Autobiographische Aufzeichnungen vom Abgang der Bonner Republik (Edition Ost, Berlin)
- 2004: "Rechts Raus," mein Ausstieg aus der Szene. Autobiography of Torsten Lemmer, a reformed neo-Nazi. Foreword by Zwerenz. Das Neue Berlin, Berlin, ISBN 3-360-01242-9.
- 2004: Sklavensprache und Revolte, der Bloch-Kreis und seine Feinde in Ost und West. (mit Ingrid Zwerenz). Schwartzkopff Buchwerke, Hamburg, ISBN 978-3-937738-11-6.

== Awards ==
- 1974: Ernst-Reuter-Preis
- 1986: Carl-von-Ossietzky-Preis für Zeitgeschichte und Politik der Stadt Oldenburg
- 1991: Alternativer Georg-Büchner-Preis
