= Dive (1929 film) =

1929 film

- Directed by: E. W. Emo
- Written by: Fritz Falkenstein; Walter Wassermann
- Produced by: Josef Stein
- Starring: Igo Sym; Corry Bell; Paul Samson-Körner
- Cinematography: László Schäffer
- Production company: Domo-Strauß-Film
- Release date: 1 February 1929
- Country: Germany
- Languages: Silent; German intertitles

Dive (German: Spelunke) is a 1929 German silent film directed by E. W. Emo and starring Igo Sym, Corry Bell, and Paul Samson-Körner.

The film's art direction was by Kurt Richter.

== Cast ==
- Igo Sym as Sträfling
- Corry Bell as Die Schwarze Else
- Paul Samson-Körner as Schlosserfranz, ein Einbrecher
- Paul Rehkopf as Der sanfte Paul
- Sig Arno as Der schicke Emil
- Annie Ann as Emils Braut
- Harry Hardt as Garreis, Mann ohne Beruf
- Paul Otto as Polizeikommissar

== Bibliography ==
- Bock, Hans-Michael; Bergfelder, Tim, eds. (2009). The Concise Cinegraph: Encyclopaedia of German Cinema. New York: Berghahn Books. ISBN 978-1-57181-655-9.
