= Two in a Car =

1932 film directed by Joe May

- Directed by: Joe May
- Written by: Bruno Granichstaedten; Ernst Marischka; Hans Wilhelm
- Produced by: Joe May; Julius Außenberg
- Starring: Karl Ludwig Diehl; Magda Schneider; Richard Romanowsky
- Cinematography: Jean Bachelet; Otto Kanturek; Bruno Timm
- Edited by: Erich Schmidt
- Music by: Bruno Granichstaedten; Willy Schmidt-Gentner
- Production company: May-Film
- Distributed by: Deutsche Lichtspiel-Syndikat
- Release date: 8 March 1932
- Running time: 98 minutes
- Country: Germany
- Language: German

Two in a Car (German: Zwei in einem Auto) is a 1932 German comedy film directed by Joe May and starring Karl Ludwig Diehl, Magda Schneider and Richard Romanowsky. It was shot at the Joinville Studios of Pathé-Natan in Paris with sets designed by the art directors Heinrich Richter and Hermann Warm. It premiered at the Gloria-Palast in Berlin. A separate French version Companion Wanted was also released. In 1940 the film was remade at the Cinecitta studios in Rome as Two on a Vacation.

== Cast ==
- Karl Ludwig Diehl as Lord Kingsdale
- Magda Schneider as Lisa Krüger
- Richard Romanowsky as Oberbuchhalter Broesecke
- Ernö Verebes
- Kurt Gerron as Agent Niedlich
- Heinz Gordon as Chauffeur Meyer
- Max Nadler as Gemütlicher Matthias

== Bibliography ==
- Bock, Hans-Michael & Bergfelder, Tim. The Concise Cinegraph: Encyclopaedia of German Cinema. Berghahn Books, 2009.
