= Fred Solm =

German actor (1899–1982)

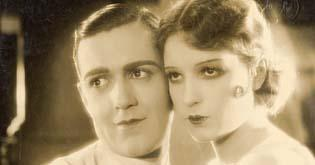
- Fred Solm and Lili Damita in The Famous Woman (1927)
- Born: Alfred Solm; Frankfurt, Germany
- Occupation: Actor

Fred Solm (22 January 1899 – 1982) was a German silent movie actor.

== Selected filmography ==
- U 9 Weddigen (1927)
- Die Lindenwirtin am Rhein (1927)
- The Champion of the World (1927)
- The Famous Woman (1927)
- Linden Lady on the Rhine (1927)
- U-9 Weddigen (1927)
- Mein Leben für das Deine (1928)
- The Great Adventuress (1928)
- Dyckerpotts' Heirs (1928)
- Number 17 (1928)
- Odette (1928)
- When the Guard Marches (1928)
- Marianne (1929)

== Bibliography ==
- Jung, Uli & Schatzberg, Walter. Beyond Caligari: The Films of Robert Wiene. Berghahn Books, 1999.
