= Paul Samson-Körner =

German boxer and actor (1887-1942)

- Born: 13 November 1887; Zwickau, German Empire
- Died: 25 August 1942 (aged 54); Berlin, Germany
- Occupations: Boxer, Actor
- Years active: 1926-1942 (film)

Paul Samson-Körner (13 November 1887 – 25 August 1942) was a German heavyweight boxer. After retiring he became a stage and film actor.

== Selected filmography ==
- Annemarie and Her Cavalryman (1926)
- The Duty to Remain Silent (1928)
- Number 17 (1928)
- Dive (1929)
- Sin and Morality (1929)
- Love in the Ring (1930)
- Three Days of Love (1931)
- The Testament of Cornelius Gulden (1932)
- Knockout (1935)
- Ninety Minute Stopover (1936)
- The Three Codonas (1940)

== Bibliography ==
- James K. Lyon. Brecht Unbound. University of Delaware Press, 1995.
