= Johanna Costenoble =

German actress (1777–1828)

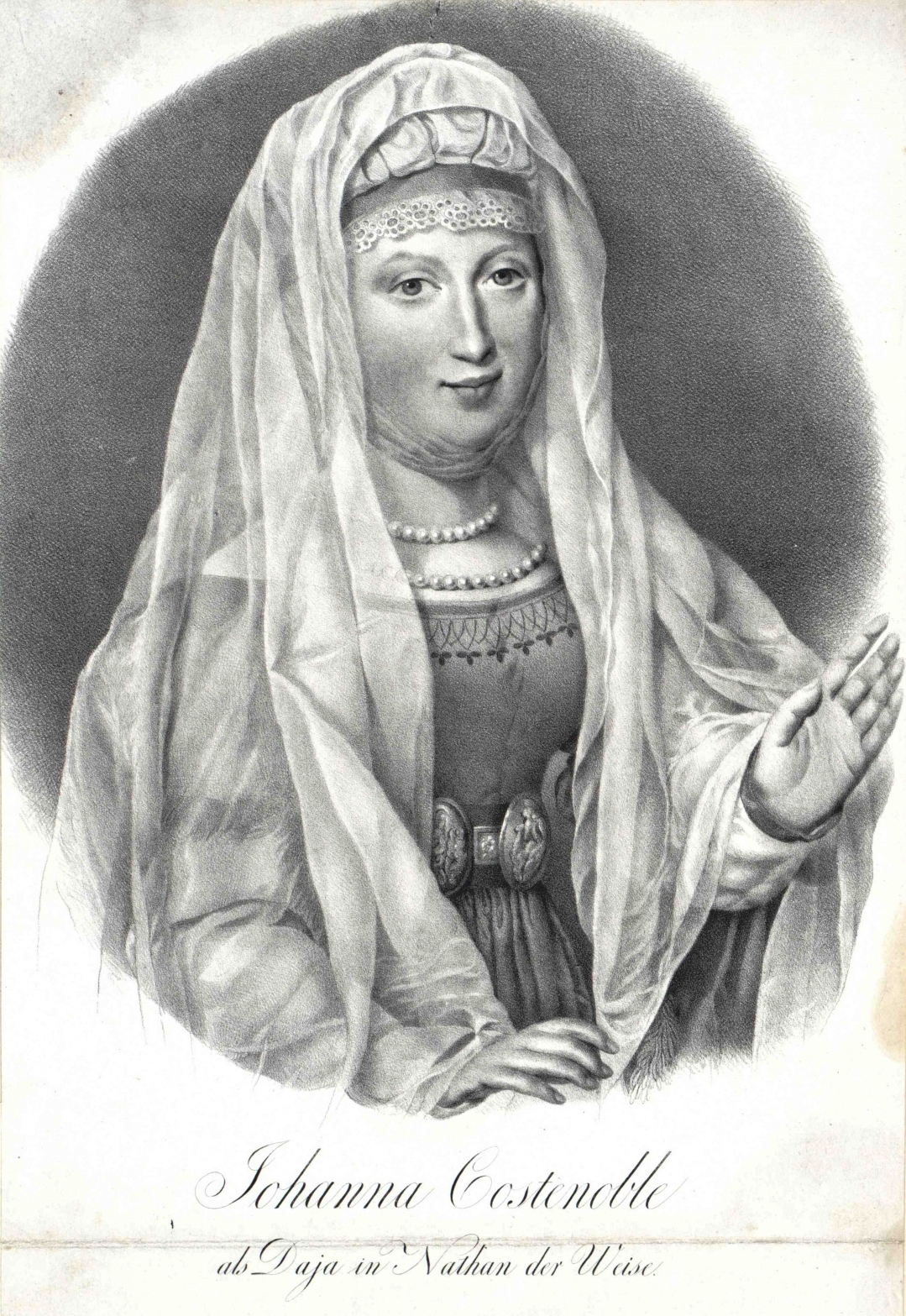
Johanna Costenoble as Daja in Nathan the Wise

Johanna Margarethe Costenoble, née Johanna Margarethe Steinhäuser (10 September 1777, in Bayreuth – 16 July 1828, in Vienna) was a German stage actress.

== Life ==
Costenoble devoted herself entirely to the stage. From 1801 to 1818, she was engaged in Hamburg and from 1818 until her death at the Hofburgtheater. She was married with the actor Karl Ludwig Costenoble.

== Bibliography ==
- Ludwig Eisenberg: Großes biographisches Lexikon der Deutschen Bühne im XIX. Jahrhundert. Edited by Paul List, Leipzig 1903, p. 166,
- "Costenoble Johanna". In: Österreichisches Biographisches Lexikon 1815–1950 (ÖBL). Vol. 1, Austrian Academy of Sciences, Vienna 1957, p. 156.
