= Boris Rosenthal =

Boris Rosenthal (1881–1938) was a character actor and operetta lyricist in the Yiddish theater. Born in Kishinev, Bessarabia to a flour merchant. Rosenthal was sent to work very early at a manufacturing factory, when the family moved to Łódź he began to frequent the German theater productions. In 1904, he played a small role in an Ida Kamińska play and then decided to become an actor. He worked in Dovid-Moyshe Sabsay's troupe, debuting in Abraham Goldfaden's Bobe Yakhne, moving then to Fishzon's troupe.

His parents left for the United States in 1906 and he followed two years later. The Actors' Union refused him work so he went to London for two seasons. In 1910 he returned to Łódź and played there successfully for three years. He then emigrated to America, where he played from 1913-1917 in Philadelphia, and then a year in New York's Yidishe kunst teater (Jewish art theater) and then in Boris Thomashefsky's National Theater and then Kessler's Second Avenue Theater and the Public Theater. He played lesser roles as he became ill and partially paralyzed. He died in New York.

He acted in one film, Gelebt un gelakht (Live and Laugh).
