= Hermann Fellner (producer) =

German screenwriter and film producer (1878–1936)

Hermann Siegfried Fellner
- Born: 26 March 1878; Frankfurt, German Empire
- Died: 22 March 1936 (aged 57); London, England
- Occupations: Screenwriter, Film Producer
- Years active: 1915–1936

Hermann Siegfried Fellner (26 March 1878 – 22 March 1936) was a German screenwriter and film producer.

He formed a production company, Felsom Film, with Josef Somlo in the silent and early sound eras. Following the Nazi takeover of power in 1933, Fellner fled into exile in Britain where he killed himself in 1936.

At the time of his suicide, Fellner was living at 20 Berkeley House, Hay Hill, Mayfair. He left an estate valued at £7,808, which was administered by his business partner Somlo and Ludwig Falk.

== Partial filmography ==
- Madness (1919)
- The Strumpet's Plaything (1922)
- Sins of Yesterday (1922)
- The Stolen Professor (1924)
- Dancing Mad (1925)
- Unmarried Daughters (1926)
- One Does Not Play with Love (1926)
- The Famous Woman (1927)
- A Modern Dubarry (1927)
- Number 17 (1928)
- The Great Adventuress (1928)
- Odette (1928)
- The Gallant Hussar (1928)
- The Woman on the Rack (1928)
- Strauss Is Playing Today (1928)
- The Wrecker (1929)
- Land Without Women (1929)
- The Fourth from the Right (1929)
- Storm in a Water Glass (1931)
- Three Days of Love (1931)
- Girls to Marry (1932)
- Tell Me Tonight (1932)
- Waltz Time (1933)
- Public Nuisance No. 1 (1936)
- Dishonour Bright (1936)

== Bibliography ==
- Bergfelder, Tim & Cargnelli, Christian. Destination London: German-speaking emigrés and British cinema, 1925–1950. Berghahn Books, 2008.
