= Oscar Werndorff =

Austrian art director (1880–1938)

- Born: 30 May 1880; Vienna, Austria-Hungary
- Died: 6 November 1938 (aged 58); Wembley, London; United Kingdom
- Other name: Oscar Friedrich Werndorff
- Occupation: Art director
- Years active: 1920 – 1938 (film)

Oscar Friedrich Werndorff (1880–1938) was an Austrian art director. After leaving Germany in the early 1930s he moved to Britain where he worked in the British film industry. He co-directed the 1931 film The Bells.

== Selected filmography ==
Art director

- The Count of Cagliostro (1920)
- The Story of a Maid (1921)
- Money in the Streets (1922)
- The Daughter of the Brigadier (1922)
- The Slipper Hero (1923)
- The Three Marys (1923)
- The Wonderful Adventure (1924)
- Carlos and Elisabeth (1924)
- Man Against Man (1924)
- Unmarried Daughters (1926)
- Nanette Makes Everything (1926)
- A Modern Dubarry (1927)
- Always Be True and Faithful (1927)
- Heaven on Earth (1927)
- Odette (1928)
- Dyckerpotts' Heirs (1928)
- The Singing City (1930)
- The First Mrs. Fraser (1932)
- The Camels Are Coming (1934)
- Forbidden Territory (1934)
- Heat Wave (1935)
- Fighting Stock (1935)
- Pagliacci (1936)
- Rhodes of Africa (1936)
- For Valour (1937)
- The Lilac Domino (1937)
- Under Secret Orders (1937)
- Keep Smiling (1938)
- The Ware Case (1938)
- Let's Be Famous (1939)

== Bibliography ==
- Bergfelder, Tim & Cargnelli, Christian. Destination London: German-speaking emigrés and British cinema, 1925-1950. Berghahn Books, 2008.
