= Karl Ludwig Costenoble =

German actor, director and writer (1769–1837)

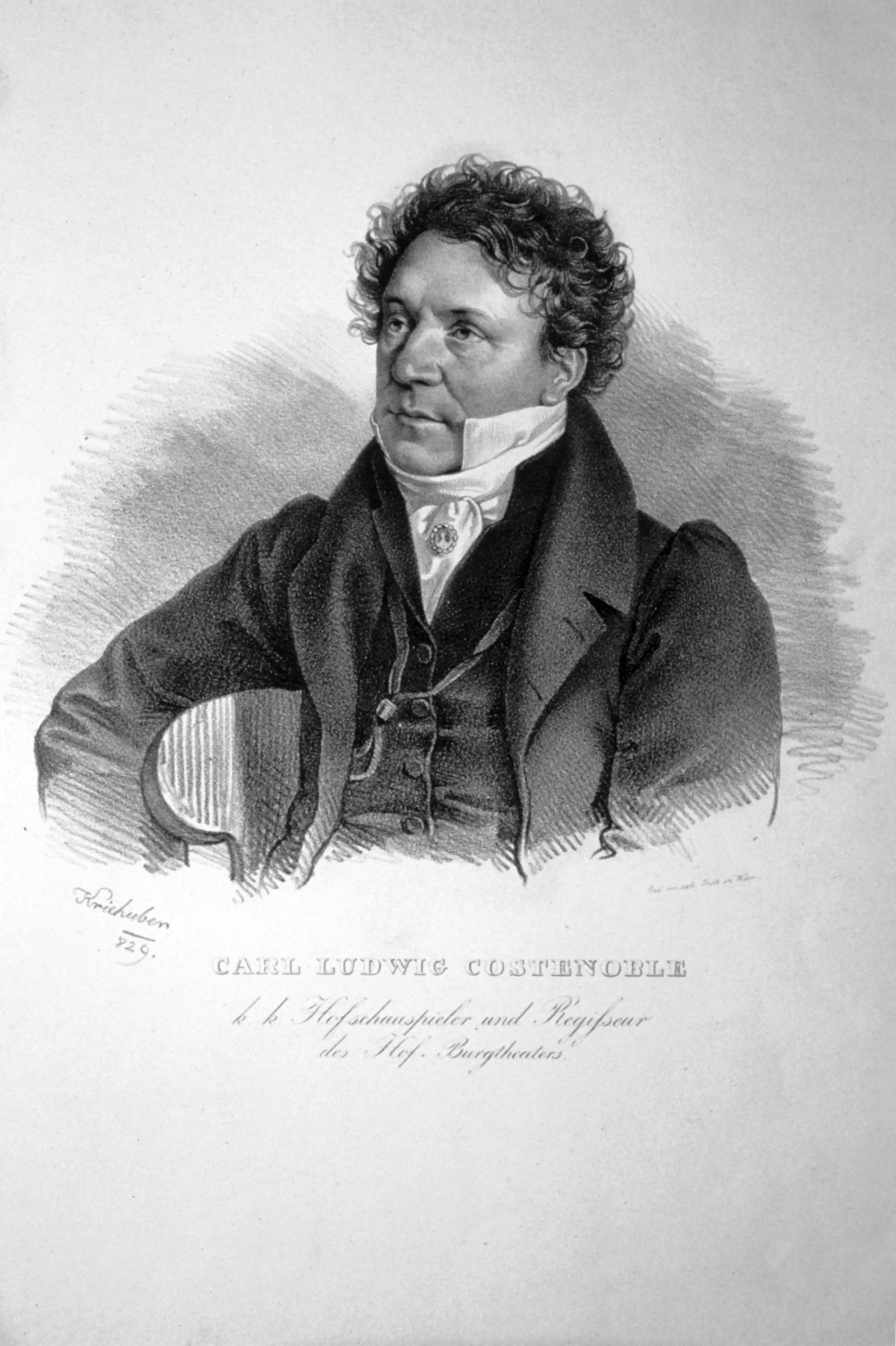
Karl Ludwig Costenoble, Lithographie von Josef Kriehuber, 1829

Karl Ludwig Costenoble, also Carl Ludwig Costenoble, (25 December 1769 – 28 August 1837) was a German stage actor, theatre director and writer.

== Life ==
Born in Herford, Costenoble was the son of a Reformed cathedral preacher. He eluded his planned appointment as clergyman by fleeing to Magdeburg. He joined several travelling stages as an actor before he got firm engagements in Bayreuth, Salzburg and finally Hamburg, where he made his debut on 10 March 1801 and played until 1818 as audience favourite, occupying different fields from singer to character actor and comedian. Among his most famous roles were Shylock in Shakespeare's The Merchant of Venice and the monk in Lessings' Nathan the Wise.

In 1818, Costenoble was appointed to the Burgtheater in Vienna, whose ensemble he belonged to until his death. The celebrated actor was also active as a director here. Costenoble died on one of his numerous tours on his way home to Prague from a guest performance in Hamburg.

He was first married with the actress Johanna Steinhäuser. The sculptor Karl Costenoble was a son from his second marriage. The Viennese folk actress Mizzi Zwerenz was his great-granddaughter.

Costenoble was buried in Vienna by a memorial at the Vienna Central Cemetery (Group 14A, Number 50), which the sculptor Parschalk executed in the form of an obelisk and which was unveiled in 1910.

== Work ==
Costenoble was also active as a writer. Above all, he wrote numerous comedies and plays which enjoyed great popularity. He also wrote Almanac dramatischer Spiele (1810-16) and diaries, which were published in 1889 under the title Aus dem Burgtheater (1818-37).

== Bibliography ==
- BLKÖ:Costenoble, Karl Ludwig
- Joseph Kürschner (1876). "Costenoble, Carl Ludwig" . Allgemeine Deutsche Biographie (in German). Vol. 4. Leipzig: Duncker & Humblot. pp. 514–515.
- Großes biographisches Lexikon der Deutschen Bühne im XIX. Jahrhundert. Ludwig Eisenberg: Edition by Paul List, Leipzig 1903, p. 165
- Alexander von Weilen: Carl Ludwig Costenobles Tagebücher von seiner Jugend bis zur Übersiedlung nach Wien. Gesellschaft für Theatergeschichte, Berlin 1912
- Costenoble über Grillparzer. Ungedruckte Notizen aus seinen Tagebüchern. Selbstverlag Alexander von Weilen, Vienna 1915
- Eleonora Schneck: Karl Ludwig Costenobles Leben und Wirken am Wiener Hofburgtheater 1818−1837. Mit neuen Mitteilungen aus seinen Tagebüchern. Dissertation. Vienna 1934
- Eckehard Catholy (1957). "Costenoble, Carl Ludwig". Neue Deutsche Biographie (in German). Vol. 3. Berlin: Duncker & Humblot. p. 375. (full text online).
- "Costenoble Karl Ludwig". In: Österreichisches Biographisches Lexikon 1815–1950 (ÖBL). Vol. 1, Austrian Academy of Sciences, Vienna 1957, p. 156.
- Felix Czeike: Historisches Lexikon Wien Bd. 1. Kremayr & Scheriau, Vienna 1992
