= Otto Kanturek =

Austrian-Czechoslovak cinematographer (1897–1941)

Otto W. Kanturek (27 July 1897 – 26 June 1941) was an Austrian, later Czechoslovak cameraman, cinematographer and film director.

== Life ==
Kanturek was born in Vienna on 27 July 1897. Having trained at the Graphischen Lehr- und Versuchsanstalt in Vienna and, after a voluntary internship for Gaumont Newsreels, he became an assistant film cameraman with them in 1912 and the following year received a post with producer Erich Pommer in Paris, filming newsreels for Pathé, Gaumont and Éclair. In 1914 he went to Milan to work for Milano-Film, then in 1915 to work with Sascha-Film in Vienna and with Alexander Korda in Budapest. During the First World War, he made his debut as chief cameraman and in 1916 he was conscripted and was seconded to the special photographic services in the military.

In 1920 he moved to Berlin and spent the 1920s working on several films, including Fritz Lang's Frau im Mond. After the Nazis seized power in Germany in 1933, he left Germany for Vienna and Prague, where he directed the film Das Glück von Grinzing. In 1933, by then a Czechoslovak citizen, he came to London, where he finally settled and continued his work as a cameraman, including on Blossom Time (known in German as Du bist mein Herz) with Richard Tauber. He also worked as a director on the romantic comedy The Student's Romance.

He died at Cawston, Norfolk on 26 June 1941, during the Second World War whilst filming the aerial shots for A Yank in the RAF from an Avro Anson, when it collided with a Hawker Hurricane. He left a widow, Edith Maria Lucia Beatrix, who was then living at St John's Wood, London.

== Filmography ==
- 1918: Das Leben einer Primadonna
- 1918: Wetterleuchten
- 1919: Fürst S. S.
- 1919: Die Rache ist mein
- 1919: Die Seele des Mörders
- 1920: Winterstürme
- 1920: Die Tragödie eines Kindes
- 1921: Hinter Gitterfenstern
- 1921: Fortunato
- The Love Affairs of Hector Dalmore (1921)
- 1921: Zu Hilfe!
- 1921: Susanne Stranzky
- 1921: Die Sonne Asiens
- 1921: Die schwarze Pantherin
- In Thrall to the Claw (1921)
- Four Around a Woman (1921)
- The Drums of Asia (1921)
- The Secrets of Berlin (1921)
- The Mute of Portici (1922)
- 1922: Der Unheimliche
- 1922: Brigantenrache
- 1923: Quarantäne
- 1924: Winterstürme
- Rosenmontag (1924)
- Darling of the King (1924)
- Dudu, a Human Destiny (1924)
- Oh Those Glorious Old Student Days (1925)
- The Elegant Bunch (1925)
- 1925: Vater Voss
- Cock of the Roost (1925)
- The Flower Girl of Potsdam Square (1925)
- 1925: Harry Hills Jagd auf den Tod
- Ballettratten (1925)
- The Queen of the Baths (1926)
- Superfluous People (1926)
- 1926: Das süße Mädel
- Mademoiselle Josette, My Woman (1926)
- 1926: Der Provinzonkel
- Circus Romanelli (1926)
- Accommodations for Marriage (1926)
- The Pride of the Company (1926)
- 1926: Die Ritt in die Sonne
- Wrath of the Seas (1926)
- The Fiddler of Florence (1926)
- The Merry Vineyard (1927)
- The Famous Woman (1927)
- Ghost Train (1927)
- The Queen Was in the Parlour (1927)
- 1927: Die Bräutigame der Babette Bomberling
- A Crazy Night (1927)
- 1928: Die Räuberbande
- Odette (1928)
- The Woman on the Rack (1928)
- The Great Adventuress (1928)
- Six Girls and a Room for the Night (1928)
- The Wrecker (1929)
- Woman in the Moon (1929)
- 1929: Die kleine Veronika
- Land Without Women (1929)
- 1930: Die Lindenwirtin
- Love Songs (1930)
- My Childish Father (1930)
- Rendezvous (1930)
- Kohlhiesel's Daughters (1930)
- Her Majesty the Barmaid (1931)
- Three Days of Love (1931)
- That's All That Matters (1931)
- The Opera Ball (1931)
- A Night at the Grand Hotel (1931)
- 24 Hours in the Life of a Woman (1931)
- The Adventurer of Tunis (1931)
- Under False Flag (1932)
- Modern Dowry (1932)
- Girls to Marry (1932)
- Two in a Car (1932)
- 1932: Sehnsucht 202
- The Tsar's Diamond (1932)
- The Escape to Nice (1932)
- Must We Get Divorced? (1933)
- A Song for You (1933)
- Grand Duchess Alexandra (1933)
- All for Love (1933)
- The Happiness of Grinzing (1933) (as director)
- Blossom Time (1934)
- The Student's Romance (1935) (as director)
- Music Hath Charms (1935)
- Love in Exile (1936)
- Pagliacci (1936)
- Let's Make a Night of It (1937)
- Please Teacher (1937)
- Spring Handicap (1937)
- Housemaster (1938)
- Queer Cargo (1938)
- Hold My Hand (1938)
- Over She Goes (1938)
- Premiere (1938)
- So This Is London (1939)
- Shipyard Sally (1939)
- Girl in the News (1940)
- Ten Days in Paris (1940)
