= The Champion of the World (1927 film) =

1927 film

- Directed by: Gennaro Righelli
- Written by: Leo Birinsky; Erika Von Der Bussche; Werner Scheff (novel)
- Produced by: Herman Millakowsky
- Starring: Fred Solm; Xenia Desni; Olga Chekhova
- Cinematography: Mutz Greenbaum
- Music by: Willy Schmidt-Gentner
- Production company: Greenbaum-Film
- Distributed by: Filmhaus Bruckmann
- Release date: 22 March 1927
- Running time: 99 minutes
- Country: Germany
- Languages: Silent; German intertitles

The Champion of the World (German: Der Meister der Welt) is a 1927 German silent film directed by Gennaro Righelli and starring Fred Solm, Xenia Desni and Olga Chekhova. The film's art direction was by Julius von Borsody. It premiered at the Marmorhaus in Berlin.

== Cast ==
- Fred Solm
- Xenia Desni
- Olga Chekhova
- Henri De Vries
- Angelo Ferrari
- Paul Graetz
- Dolly Grey
- Antonie Jaeckel
- Fritz Kampers
- Harry Lamberts-Paulsen

== Bibliography ==
- Hans-Michael Bock and Tim Bergfelder. The Concise Cinegraph: An Encyclopedia of German Cinema. Berghahn Books.
