= Storm in a Teacup (film) =

1937 film

- Theatrical poster
- Directed by: Ian Dalrymple; Victor Saville
- Screenplay by: Donald Bull; Ian Dalrymple
- Based on: Sturm im Wasserglas (German) by Bruno Frank; Storm in a Teacup (UK) and Storm Over Patsy (US) by James Bridie
- Produced by: Victor Saville; Stanley Haynes
- Starring: Vivien Leigh; Rex Harrison; Cecil Parker; Sara Allgood
- Cinematography: Mutz Greenbaum
- Edited by: Cyril Randell; Hugh Stewart
- Music by: Frederick Lewis
- Production company: London Films
- Release date: 12 June 1937 (UK)
- Running time: 87 minutes
- Country: United Kingdom
- Language: English

Storm in a Teacup is a 1937 British romantic comedy film directed by Ian Dalrymple and Victor Saville and starring Vivien Leigh, Rex Harrison, Cecil Parker, and Sara Allgood. It is based on the German play Sturm im Wasserglas by Bruno Frank, as well as the English-language adaptations: London's Storm in a Teacup and Broadway's Storm Over Patsy, both written by James Bridie. A reporter writes an article that embarrasses a politician. Meanwhile, the newspaperman is also attracted to his target's daughter.

== Plot ==
A Scottish town's powerful provost (mayor) struts and brags about his city "improvements" while the cowed villagers are sullenly forced to put up with him. A free-spirited English reporter is brought from London to work for the local newspaper and soon clashes with the autocrat—while falling in love with his daughter. He strikes out against the provost by taking up the cause of a poor woman who sells ice cream from a pushcart, and has dared to protest against the provost's new "dog tax". The local police are about to put her sheepdog Patsy to death because she cannot pay the back taxes and subsequent fine incurred by her ownership of the dog.

The idealistic young reporter exposes the injustice in the local newspaper before the editors have a chance to suppress the article, and it sparks an indignant protest campaign all over England and Scotland. The furious provost rashly sues the "cheeky little rotter from London" for libel. A courtroom scene ensues which strongly resembles a "kangaroo trial" until, in view of local support for the defendant (with the villagers humorously barking like dogs) and the budding love affair between the reporter and the provost daughter, the provost gives up, and all is happily resolved.

== Cast ==
- Vivien Leigh as Victoria Gow
- Rex Harrison as Frank Burdon
- Cecil Parker as Provost William Gow
- Sara Allgood as Honoria Hegarty
- Ursula Jeans as Lisbet Skirving
- Gus McNaughton as Horace Skirving
- Edgar K. Bruce as McKellar (credited as Edgar Bruce)
- Robert Hale as Lord Skerryvore
- Quentin McPhearson as Baillie Callender (credited as Quinton Macpherson)
- Arthur Wontner as Procurator Fiscal
- Eliot Makeham as Sheriff
- George Pughe as Menzies
- Arthur Seaton as Police Sergeant
- Cecil Mannering as Police Constable
- Ivor Barnard as Watkins
- Cyril Smith as Councillor
- W. G. Fay as Michael Cassidy (credited as W G. Fay)
- Jack Short as Donald (golf caddy)
- Mervyn Johns as Clerk of the Court
- Scruffy as Patsy, the dog

== Reception ==
At the time of the film's initial release, reviews were favourable. In The New York Times, Frank S. Nugent called it "an engaging miniature" and "a splendid comic brew". The critic for The Montreal Gazette wrote, "the excellent story is done fullest justice by the directors, Victor Saville and Dalrymple, and by the large and often-brilliant cast." The critic for Boys' Life called it "a riot of fun for the audience."

The number of favourable reviews grew over time. Leonard Maltin rated this movie three out of four stars and called it "witty social comedy." The book Guide to British Cinema considered this film as one of Victor Saville's "well-crafted, genre films" and "the breezy Rex Harrison–Vivien Leigh social comedy." The book British Film Directors: A Critical Guide called it "a whimsical comedy with anti-fascist undercurrents." The book A Chorus of Raspberries: British Film Comedy 1929–1939 considered this film "one of the best British comedies of the decade."

Anne Edwards, author of the 1977 biography of Vivien Leigh, considered this film a "funny but inconsequential comedy;" nevertheless, she called Leigh's performance "witty and warm" for her role that "could not have given [Leigh] much pride of accomplishment."

== Radio version ==
The play was adapted for Australian radio in 1940 with Peter Finch.
