= Arthur Bárdos =

Hungarian writer and theatre director

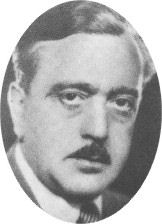
- Born: 2 April 1882; Budapest, Hungary
- Died: 10 August 1974 (aged 92); Buffalo, New York; United States
- Occupations: Theare director, writer

Arthur Bárdos (1892–1974) was a leading Hungarian writer and theatre director. He left Hungary in 1949, moving to Britain where he staged Shakespeare's Hamlet.

== Selected filmography ==
- The Queen of Spades (1927)
- A Scandal in Paris (1928)
- The Gallant Hussar (1928)
- It Was Me (1936)

== Bibliography ==
- Kennedy, Dennis. Foreign Shakespeare: Contemporary Performance. Cambridge University Press, 2004.
