= Mizzi Zwerenz =

Austrian singer and actress

Mizzi Zwerenz Guttmann
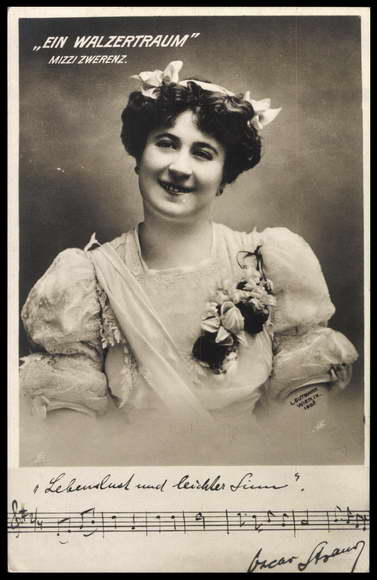

Background information
- Born: Maria Anna Zwerenz; 13 July 1876; Piešťany, Austria-Hungary
- Died: 14 June 1947 (aged 70) Vienna, Austria
- Occupations: Opera singer, actress

Maria Anna "Mizzi" Zwerenz, married name Marie Guttmann (13 July 1876 – 14 June 1947) was an Austrian opera soprano, theater and film actress.

== Biography ==
She was born on 13 July 1876 in Piešťany. Her father Karl Ludwig Zwerenz (1850–1925) was an actor and director, as well as director of theaters in Bolzano, Merano, Bucharest, Teplice, Jihlava, Pressburg and Bad Hall. Her mother, Eveline Zwerenz (1842–1921), worked at the Stadttheater in Baden bei Wien from 1888 to 1891 and 1893 to 1903. Her grandfather Karl Zwerenz (1826-1898) and her great-grandfather Karl Ludwig Costenoble were Hofburg actors. At first, she did not want to follow in the footsteps of the family. Then she followed the tradition, took lessons and made her debut in Baden bei Wien. She played in Bielitz, at the summer theater in Mödling, toured with the Wiener Soubrettenensemble in Russia, in Friedrich-Wilhelmstädtischen Theater in Berlin and sang between 1901 and 1920 in the Carltheater in Vienna. There she starred as Helena in the original 1913 production of Oskar Nedbal's hit operetta Polenblut in which she had a tremendous success.

At the Viennese Apollo-Theater, Zwerenz was a major force. In the early 1920s, she ran the Mizzi Zwerenz establishment in Baden, (Note: Das Haus Gasthof zum Goldenen Hirschen, ehemals Hauptplatz 12, wurde 2003 durch den Neubau eines Geldinstituts ersetzt. Rudolf Maurer: Rote Rose, Goldener Hirsch. Die Volksbank-Häuser am Hauptplatz der Stadt Baden. Katalogblätter des Rollettmuseums Baden, Band 59. Rollettmuseum Baden, Baden 2006, ISBN 3-901951-59-8, passim.) for which she collaborated with popular actors (including Fritz Imhoff). In addition to her stage work, she appeared in several films, including Die kleine Veronika (1929) and Walzer um den Stephansturm (1935).

Mizzi Zwerenz died of a heart condition on 14 June 1947 in Vienna. She is buried at the city's Hietzing Cemetery (group 29, number 9).

Zwerenz married actor Arthur Guttmann (1877-1952), brother of the twins Emil and Paul Guttmann, in 1905. She retired from the stage in 1937. Their son, Fritz Zwerenz (3 September 1895 in Vienna; 12 October 1970 in Linz), was successful, sometimes supporting his mother's artistry as a Kapellmeister in the field of music theater. After World War II, he worked mainly as a concert conductor and at the radio station Radio Linz.
