= Felsom Film =

German film production company

Felsom Film was a film production company which operated in Weimar Germany between 1922 and 1933. It was founded and run by producers Hermann Fellner and Josef Somlo. The company's name is a blend of their surnames.

During the 1920s, the firm embarked on a series of co-productions with the British studio Gainsborough Pictures. In September 1929, the company released Land Without Women, the first full-length German language sound film using the Tri-Ergon sound-on-film process. The film predated the German company UFA's Melody of the Heart, which wasn't released until December 1929. Following the Nazi takeover, they dissolved their company and fled into exile in Britain.

== Partial filmography ==
- Dancing Mad (1925)
- A Modern Dubarry (1927)
- The Woman on the Rack (1928)
- Number 17 (1928)
- Strauss Is Playing Today (1928)
- The Great Adventuress (1928)
- The Gallant Hussar (1928)
- The Wrecker (1929)
- The Fourth from the Right (1929)
- Land Without Women (1929)
- Three Days of Love (1931)
- Mädchen zum Heiraten (1932)

== Bibliography ==
- Bergfelder, Tim & Cargnelli, Christian. Destination London: German-speaking emigrés and British cinema, 1925–1950. Berghahn Books, 2008.
- Hardt, Ursula (1996). From Caligari to California: Erich Pommer's Life in the International Film Wars. Providence: Berghahn Books. ISBN 978-1-57181-930-7.
