= Her Majesty, Love =

1931 film

- Directed by: William Dieterle
- Written by: Robert Lord; Arthur Caesar; Joseph Jackson (uncredited)
- Screenplay by: Robert Lord; Arthur Caesar
- Based on: Ihre Majestät die Liebe (1931 German film) by: Rudolf Bernauer; Adolf Lantz; Rudolf Österreicher
- Starring: Marilyn Miller
- Cinematography: Robert Kurrle
- Edited by: Ralph Dawson
- Music by: Leo F. Forbstein
- Production company: First National Pictures
- Distributed by: Warner Bros. Pictures
- Release date: December 15, 1931
- Running time: 75 minutes
- Country: United States
- Language: English

Her Majesty, Love is a 1931 American pre-Code musical comedy drama film directed by William Dieterle for First National Pictures, starring Broadway stars Marilyn Miller and Ben Lyon, and in his talking feature debut, W. C. Fields.

It is a remake of the German film Her Majesty the Barmaid (1931).

== Plot ==
Fred von Wellingen, heir to a wealthy industrial family, falls for cabaret bartender Lia Toerrek and proposes to her on the condition that she dances with him. She accepts, but their engagement outrages Fred's aristocratic family, who disapprove of Lia's working-class background and her eccentric father, a former vaudevillian whose antics scandalize them at a formal dinner. To prevent the marriage, they offer Fred a lucrative contract and an esteemed title in exchange for breaking the engagement. Although he reluctantly agrees, he cannot bring himself to tell Lia.

Lia eventually discovers the truth and publicly confronts Fred at a high-society dinner where their engagement was to be announced. Her bold defiance catches the attention of Baron von Schwarzdorf, a notorious aristocrat with six previous wives, who impulsively proposes to her. Feeling lost, Lia accepts. Fred rushes to stop the wedding but arrives too late. However, as the newly titled Baroness, Lia is now socially acceptable in Fred's family's eyes. As they dance together, Fred subtly implies that her marriage to the Baron may not last long—hinting that love will ultimately find its way back to them.

== Cast ==
- Marilyn Miller as Lia Toerrek
- Ben Lyon as Fred von Wellingen
- W. C. Fields as Lia's Father
- Leon Errol as Baron von Schwarzdorf
- Ford Sterling as Otmar
- Chester Conklin as Emil
- Harry Stubbs as Hanneman
- Clarence Wilson as Uncle Cornelius
- Harry Holman as Reisenfeld
- Ruth Hall as Factory secretary
- Mae Madison as Elli, Fred's sister
- Maude Eburne as Aunt Harriette
- Virginia Sale as Laura Reisenfeld
- William Irving as Second man in cabaret

== Preservation status ==
Prints of Her Majesty, Love are held in the Turner Library and the Library of Congress.
