= Walter Jurmann =

Austrian composer

External audio
- Shellac recordings with Walter Jurmann in the Online Archive of the Österreichische Mediathek

Walter Jurmann (October 12, 1903 – June 17, 1971) was an Austrian-born composer of popular music renowned for his versatility who, after immigrating to the United States, specialized in film scores and soundtracks.

== Biography ==
Born in Vienna, Jurmann received a classical education, taking his Matura exams in 1921. For some time he studied medicine but in 1924, after working as a lounge pianist in a posh hotel in the Semmering area of Lower Austria, abandoned his studies altogether in order to pursue a career in music. He moved to Berlin and soon became successful with tunes such as "Du bist nicht die Erste". Probably his most famous 1920s song is "Veronika, der Lenz ist da", popularized by the all-male a cappella ensemble, the Comedian Harmonists. With the arrival of sound movies Jurmann also began writing film music, starting with Ihre Majestät, die Liebe (Her Majesty, Love) (1930). Jurmann's melodies were so charming and easy to remember that a contemporary paper reported that cinemagoers were humming the new tunes already on the morning following the release of a new film.

In 1933, after the Nazis had come to power, Jurmann left Berlin for Paris, France, where he continued writing songs, occasionally incorporating elements of the French chanson. In 1934 he met Louis B. Mayer, who offered him a seven-year contract with MGM. Subsequently, Jurmann and his partner, Polish-born composer Bronisław Kaper (1902 - 1983), went to Hollywood. Jurmann's successful films include Mutiny on the Bounty (1935) ("Love Song of Tahiti"), the 1936 movie San Francisco ("Theme from San Francisco"), the Marx Brothers films A Night at the Opera ("Cosi Cosa," 1935) and A Day at the Races ("All God's Chillun Got Rhythm," 1937), and Presenting Lily Mars (1943) starring Judy Garland.

In the early 1940s Jurmann, who had settled down in Los Angeles, withdrew from the film business although he continued writing Ohrwürmer up to his death. In 1953 he married Yvonne Jellinek, a Hungarian fashion designer whom he had met at a party in the U.S. In 1971, during a trip to Europe, he died unexpectedly of a heart attack in Budapest, his wife's home town. He is interred in the Hollywood Forever Cemetery in Hollywood, California.

== Selected filmography ==
- That's All That Matters (1931)
- The Big Attraction (1931)
- Salto Mortale (1931)
- Marriage with Limited Liability (1931)
- Her Majesty the Barmaid (1931)
- His Highness Love (1931)
- Scandal on Park Street (1932)
- Three on a Honeymoon (1932)
- Things Are Getting Better Already (1932)
- A Mad Idea (1932)
- Madame Wants No Children (1933)
- Honeymoon Trip (1933)
- Today Is the Day (1933)
- All for Love (1933)
- A Song for You (1933)
- A Man Has Been Stolen (1934)
- Moscow Nights (1934)

== See also ==
- List of Austrians in music
