= Rudolf Bernauer =

Austrian lyricist (1880–1953)

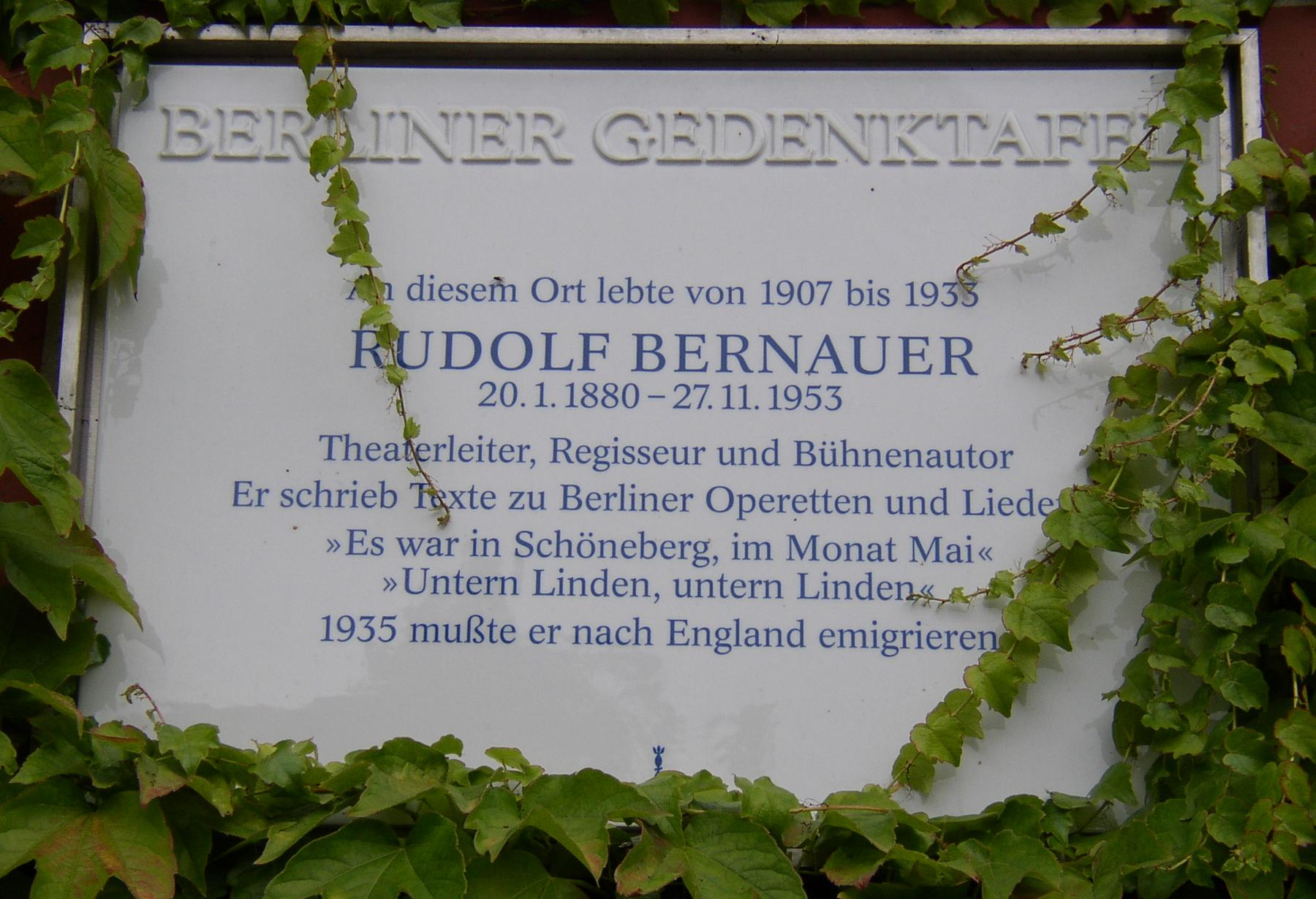
Berlin plaque at former residence site of Rudolf Bernauer in Berlin-Schöneberg.

Rudolf Bernauer (20 January 1880, in Vienna – 27 November 1953, in London) was an Austrian lyricist, librettist, screenwriter, film director, producer, and actor.

His autobiography is "Theater meines Lebens. Erinnerungen" ("Theater of my life: Memories"), published in Berlin in 1955.

== Life ==
He made his 1900 debut as an actor at the Deutsches Theater in Berlin. In 1907, he took over the Berlin Theater with Carl Meinhardt, then in 1911 to the Hebbel Theater and 1913, the comedy house. Finally, he was the owner of the theater at Nollendorfplatz.

Rudolf Bernauer wrote lyrics for the Berlin operettas: Der liebe Augustin (1912), Wie einst im Mai (1913), The mysterious history of the conductor Kreisler (1922), for which his own simultaneous stage ("Kreislerbühne") was developed, and Kreislers Eckfenster (1923).

His songs include: "Die Männer sind alle Verbrecher" ("All men are criminals..."), "Untern Linden, untern Linden" ("Unter den Linden") and "Es war in Schöneberg im Monat Mai" ("It was in Schöneberg in the month of May"). In 1924, he gave up all of his stages.

In 1935, he emigrated (fled) to London. He had a large apartment at Viktoria-Luise-Platz 1, in Berlin-Schöneberg (Germany), but the whole building was destroyed during the war. On a new building at this address in 1998 a memorial plaque was dedicated to him. The unveiling of the plaque was attended by his daughter, the actress Agnes Bernelle.

He staged a total of two movies, but wrote screenplays and texts for some other films.

Bernauer was Jewish Hungarian but he converted to Roman Catholicism in the mid-1930s along with Bernelle. His wife, Bernelle's mother Emmy (née Erb), was a German Protestant.

Actress Evelyn Rudie is his granddaughter.

== List of works ==
=== Plays by Rudolf Bernauer ===
- The Chocolate Soldier (Der tapfere Soldat, with Leopold Jacobson, 1908, operetta, music by Oscar Straus) - based on Arms and the Man by George Bernard Shaw
- Die keusche Barbara (Cudná Barbora, with Leopold Jacobson, 1910, operetta, music by Oskar Nedbal)
- Der liebe Augustin (with Ernst Welisch, 1912, operetta, music by Leo Fall) - English-language adaptation: Princess Caprice
- Große Rosinen (with Rudolph Schanzer, 1912, Große Originalposse mit Musik und Tanz, music by Walter Kollo and Willy Bredschneider)
- Filmzauber (with Rudolph Schanzer, 1912, Posse mit Gesang, music by Walter Kollo and Willy Bredschneider)
- Wie einst im Mai (with Rudolph Schanzer, 1913, Posse mit Gesang und Tanz, music by Walter Kollo and Willy Bredschneider) - English-language adaptation: Maytime
- Extrablätter (with Rudolph Schanzer and Heinz Gordon, 1914, music by Walter Kollo and Willy Bredschneider)
- Jung-England (with Ernst Welisch, 1914, operetta, music by Leo Fall)
- Wenn zwei Hochzeit machen (with Rudolph Schanzer, 1915, Scherzspiel mit Gesang und Tanz, music by Walter Kollo and Willy Bredschneider)
- Auf Flügeln des Gesangs (with Rudolph Schanzer, 1916, music by Walter Kollo and Willy Bredschneider)
- Die tolle Komtess (with Rudolph Schanzer, 1917, operetta, music by Walter Kollo)
- Blitzblaues Blut (with Rudolph Schanzer, 1918, operetta, music by Walter Kollo)
- Sterne, die wieder leuchten (with Rudolph Schanzer and Michael Klapp, 1918, operetta, music by Walter Kollo)
- Die Sache mit Lola (with Rudolph Schanzer, 1920)
- Prinzessin Olala (with Rudolph Schanzer, 1921, music by Jean Gilbert)
- Die wunderlichen Geschichten des Kapellmeisters Kreisler (with Carl Meinhard, 1922, music by Emil von Reznicek) - based on Tomcat Murr by E. T. A. Hoffmann
- Die Geliebte Seiner Hoheit (with Rudolf Österreicher, 1924, operetta, music by Jean Gilbert)
- Der Garten Eden (with Rudolf Österreicher, 1926) - English-language adaptation: The Garden of Eden
- Das zweite Leben (with Rudolf Österreicher, 1927)
- Geld auf der Straße (with Rudolf Österreicher, 1928)
- Das Konto X (with Rudolf Österreicher, 1930)

=== Filmography ===
- Maytime (1923, based on Wie einst im Mai)
- Maytime (1926, based on Wie einst im Mai)
- The Garden of Eden (1928, based on Der Garten Eden)
- The Beloved of His Highness (1928, based on Die Geliebte Seiner Hoheit)
- Three Sinners (1928, based on Das zweite Leben)
- Princess Olala (1928, based on Prinzessin Olala)
- The Crazy Countess (1928, based on Die tolle Komtess)
- Money on the Street (1930, based on Geld auf der Straße)
- Her Majesty the Barmaid (screenplay with Rudolf Österreicher and Adolf Lantz, 1931)
- Hirsekorn greift ein (screenplay with Rudolf Österreicher, 1931, producer and director)
- His Highness Love (1931, French-language version of the film Her Majesty the Barmaid)
- Once a Lady (1931, based on Das zweite Leben)
- The Office Manager (1931, based on Das Konto X)
- Her Majesty, Love (1931, American remake of the 1931 film Her Majesty the Barmaid)
- The Magic Top Hat (screenplay with Rudolf Österreicher, 1932, director)
- A Song for You (screenplay with Ernst Marischka and Irma von Cube, 1933)
- All for Love (1933, French-language version of the film A Song for You)
- My Song for You (1934, British remake of the 1933 film A Song for You)
- Leap into Bliss (screenplay with Karl Farkas, 1934)
- Southern Roses (screenwriter, 1936)
- Land Without Music (screenwriter, 1936)
- (The 1937 film Maytime is not based on Rudolf Bernauer's play)
- The Lilac Domino (screenwriter, 1937)
- Under Secret Orders (screenwriter, 1937)
- Wie einst im Mai (1938, based on Wie einst im Mai)
- Ducháček Will Fix It (1938, based on Das Konto X)
- Daddy Long Legs (screenwriter, 1938)
- (The 1941 film The Chocolate Soldier is not based on Rudolf Bernauer's play)
- Hatter's Castle (screenwriter, 1942)
- Give Me the Stars (screenwriter, 1945)

=== Works as lyricist ===
The earliest known work is as a lyricist:

- The Chocolate Soldier (1941) lyrics for songs: "The Chocolate Soldier" (1909), "Forgive" (1909), "My Hero" (1909), "Seek the Spy" (1909), "Sympathy" (1909), "Thank the Lord the War Is Over" (1909), "Tiralala" (1909).
