= Her Majesty the Barmaid =

1931 film directed by Joe May

- Directed by: Joe May
- Written by: Rudolf Bernauer; Adolf Lantz; Rudolf Österreicher
- Produced by: Joe May
- Starring: Käthe von Nagy; Francis Lederer; Otto Wallburg; Gretl Theimer
- Cinematography: Otto Kanturek
- Music by: Walter Jurmann; Bronislau Kaper
- Production company: Deutsche Lichtspiel-Syndikat
- Distributed by: Standard-Filmverleih
- Release date: 9 January 1931
- Running time: 102 minutes
- Country: Germany
- Language: German

Her Majesty the Barmaid or Her Majesty Love (German: Ihre Majestät die Liebe) is a 1931 German comedy film directed by Joe May and starring Käthe von Nagy, Francis Lederer and Otto Wallburg. It was shot at the Joinville Studios of Pathé in Paris. It premiered on 9 January 1931. A separate French-language version His Highness Love was produced at the same time. An American remake Her Majesty, Love was also released the same year by Hollywood studio Warner Brothers.

== Main cast ==
- Käthe von Nagy as Lia Török
- Francis Lederer as Fred von Wellingen
- Otto Wallburg as Othmar von Wellingen - Freds Bruder
- Gretl Theimer as Elli von Wellingen - seine Tochter
- Alexandra Schmitt as Großmama
- Adele Sandrock as Großtante Henriette
- Szöke Szakall as Bela Török / Lias Vater
- Ralph Arthur Roberts as Baron Schwapsdorf
- Kurt Gerron as Hornberg
- Walter Steinbeck as Hannemann
- Tibor Halmay as Friedrich Hempel
- Leo Monosson as Barsänger
- Lina Woiwode as Frau von Lingenfeld
- Paul Henckels as Standesbeamter
- Gerhard Bienert as Werkmeister

== See also ==
- Son altesse l'amour (1931, French-language version)
- Her Majesty, Love (1931, American remake)

== Bibliography ==
- Grange, William (2008). Cultural Chronicle of the Weimar Republic. Scarecrow Press. ISBN 978-0-8108-5967-8.
- Klaus, Ulrich J. Deutsche Tonfilme: Jahrgang 1931. Klaus-Archiv, 2006.
