= The Magic Top Hat =

1932 film

- Directed by: Rudolf Bernauer
- Written by: Jacobsohn; Rudolf Österreicher; Rudolf Bernauer
- Starring: Charlotte Ander; Felix Bressart; Oskar Sima; Adele Sandrock
- Cinematography: Heinrich Balasch; Willy Winterstein
- Edited by: Friedel Buckow; Graf Norman
- Music by: Bruno Granichstaedten
- Production company: Elite-Tonfilm
- Distributed by: Siegel-Monopolfilm
- Release date: 19 August 1932
- Running time: 88 minutes
- Country: Germany
- Language: German

The Magic Top Hat (German: Der Glückszylinder) is a 1932 German comedy film directed by Rudolf Bernauer and starring Charlotte Ander, Felix Bressart and Oskar Sima. It was shot at the Grunewald Studios in Berlin. The film's sets were designed by the art director Alfred Junge.

== Synopsis ==
A financially-struggling clerk falls in love with an attractive but equally impoverished actress. When she lands a contract with a film studio, it seems their problems will be over.

== Cast ==
- Charlotte Ander as Käte Wachtel
- Felix Bressart as Gottfried Jonathan Bankbeamter
- Oskar Sima as Generaldirektor Andreas
- Adele Sandrock as Edith, seine Schwester
- Karl Meinhardt as Delius, Roman-Schriftsteller
- Margo Lion as Olgar seine Frau
- Hans Zesch-Ballot as Alfred
- Max Ehrlich as Schmidt Kapellmeister
- Paul Heidemann as Plank
- Senta Söneland as Fräulein Grieseberg
- Hans Leibelt as Oberregisseur
- Julius Falkenstein as Dr.Pautus Dramaturg
- Eugen Jensen
- Lina Woiwode
- Michael von Newlinsky
- Ilse Gery
- H. von Schwindt
- Erika Fiedler
- Ernst Behmer

== Bibliography ==
- Hake, Sabine (2001). Popular Cinema of the Third Reich. University of Texas Press. ISBN 978-0-292-73458-6.
- Klaus, Ulrich J. Deutsche Tonfilme: Jahrgang 1932. Klaus-Archiv, 1988.
