= Barbara's Rhubarb Bar =

German and Dutch tongue twister and novelty song

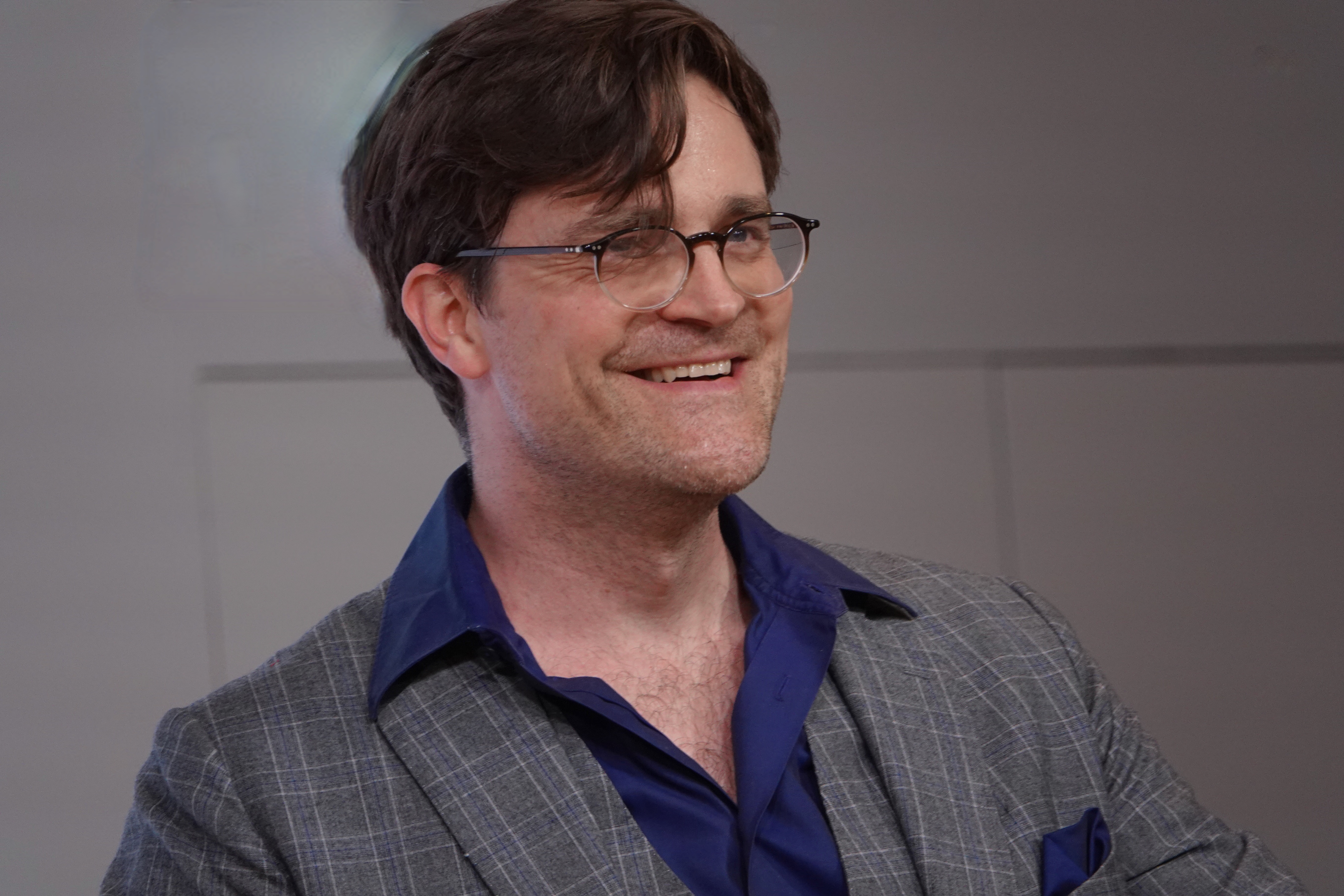
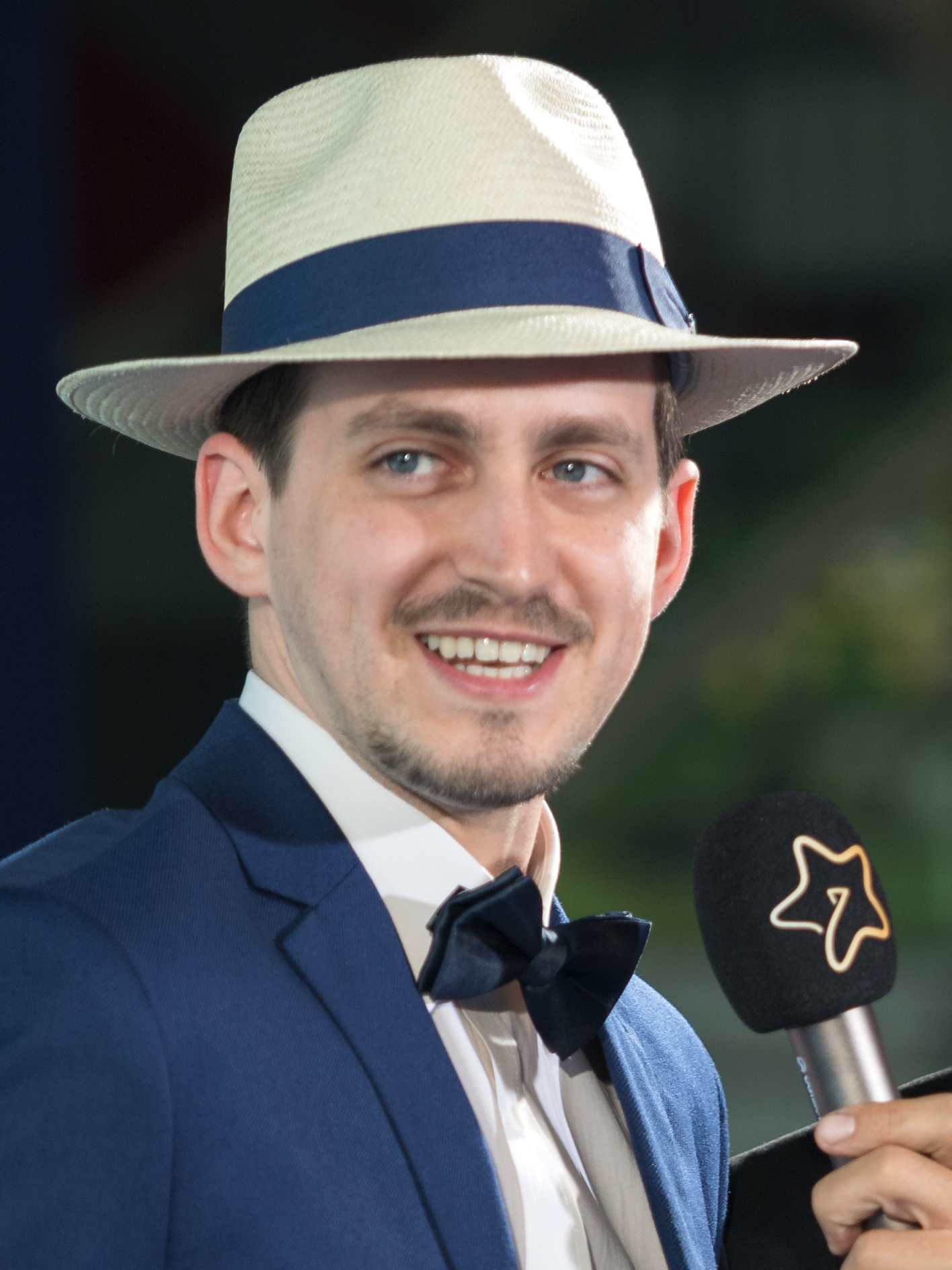
Bodo Wartke and Marti Fischer created a popular version of the song.

Barbara's Rhubarb Bar (German: Barbaras Rhabarberbar) is a German and Dutch tongue twister that gave rise to a popular novelty song. The tongue twister is based on repetition of the sound "bar", and celebrates a well-liked seasonal dessert.

A German music video of the song, created in late 2023, became an internet phenomenon, getting over 47 million views on TikTok within a few months.

== Creation ==
=== Tongue twister ===
The German tongue twister, Rhabarberbarbarabarbarbarenbartbarbierbier, had existed in various forms before the creation of the song. Such constructions have occurred since antiquity. A Vulgar Latin graffito about barbarians, reading "Barbara barbaribus barbabant barbara barbis", was found at Pompeii.

In the Germanic languages, the words "Barbara", "rhubarb", and "barbarian" have a shared etymology, originating from the Ancient Greek βάρβαρος (bárbaros), referring to foreigners, and literally meaning "babbler", as of a foreign language; "barber" derives from the Latin barba, for "beard". The modern tongue twister makes use of how compounding can result in long words in German, where multiple individual words are combined into a single long word, without spacing. It is constructed in the Präteritum tense.

An early German occurrence of a similar tongue twister can be found in a 1915 news article from Oberhausen, blaming vandalism of a rhubarb garden on Rhabarberbarbaren ("rhubarb barbarians"). An early Dutch version of the tongue twister, rabarberbarbarabarbarbierbarbaren (" Rhubarb-Barbara's bar's barber's barbarians") can be found in Binnenspel, a Dutch book with children's games from around 1935.

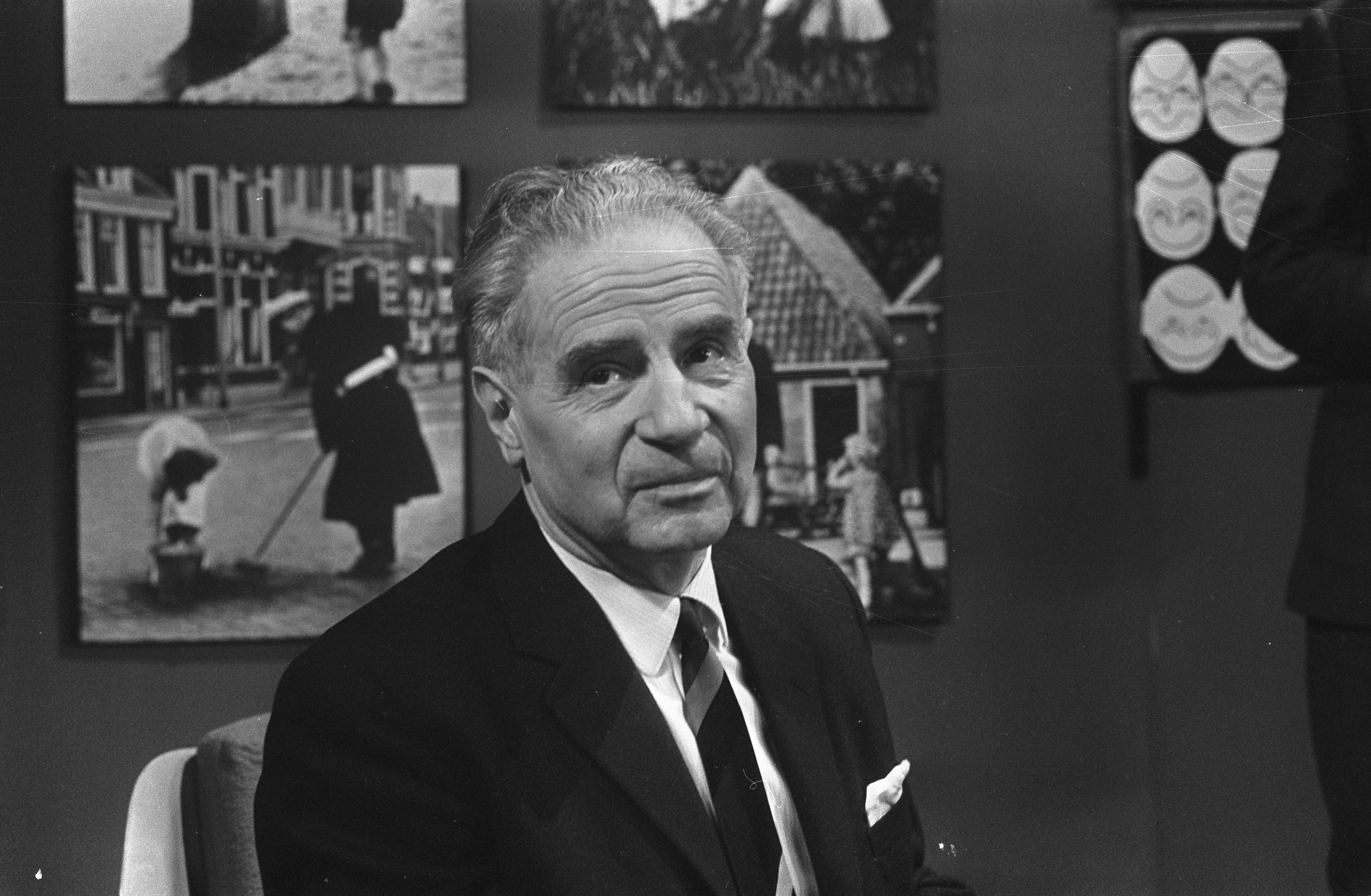
In the 1930s, a Dutch version of the tongue twister was used by Chiel de Boer in his cabaret routines.

The tongue twister has been widespread in the Dutch language since the mid-20th century. In 1981, it appeared as Barbararabarberbararabierenbarbarenbaardenbarbier ("Barbara's rhubarb bar's Arab barbarians' beards' barber") in Opperlandse taal- & letterkunde, a book of word play from Hugo Brandt Corstius. Brandt Corstius remembers having heard the tongue twister before World War II in one of Chiel de Boer's comedy routines. A 1950 article with rhubarb recipes in Libelle refers to the tongue twister in the introduction, suggesting that it "must have been invented by a logopedician as an exercise for slow talkers". An article in the Dutch newspaper Het Parool from 1954 mentions the tongue twister and says it was originally an American joke. In 1991, cartoonist Evert Geradts published a Gyro Gearloose comic strip episode based on the same story.

A particularly elaborate version of the tongue twister in German goes:

Nach dem Stutzen des Rhabarberbarbarabarbarbarenbarts ging der Rhabarberbarbarabarbarbarenbartbarbier meist mit den Rhabarberbarbarabarbarbaren in die Rhabarberbarbarabarbarbarenbartbarbierbierbar zu Rhabarberbarbarabarbarbarenbartbarbierbierbarbärbel um sie mit zur Rhabarberbarbarabar zu nehmen um etwas von Rhabarberbarbaras herrlichem Rhabarberkuchen zu essen und ein Rhabarberbarbarabarbarbarenbartbarbierbier anzustoßen. (Note: In English: After pruning the Rhubarb Barbara Bar Barbarian Beards, the Rhubarb Barbara Bar Barbarian Beard Barber mostly with the Rhubarb Barbara Bar Barbarians went to the Rhubarb Barbara Bar Barbarian Beard Barber Bier Bar to Rhubarb Barbara Bar Barbarian Beard Barber Bier Bar Bärbel in order to take her along to the Rhubarb Barbara Bar in order to eat some of Rhubarb Barbara’s superb rhubarb pie.)

=== Song and videos ===
The song and the original music video were created in December 2023 by comedian Bodo Wartke and music producer Marti Fischer. Wartke had the idea of making a humorous rap-like song and video based on the tongue twister and wrote the lyrics, while Fischer created the music. (Note: Although Di Placido attributes the lyrics to Fischer, other sources identify Wartke as the lyricist.) Wartke often makes comedic songs from German tongue twisters, which he says he frequently discovers on speech therapy websites. When asked if Barbara is a real person, Wartke replied: "Sure! Unfortunately, I haven't met her yet." The New York Times reports that the video briefly ranked above Beyoncé on some streaming media music charts.

The lyrics describe Barbara, who lives in a small town, and who creates an extraordinary rhubarb cake. She opens a bar to serve the cake. Three barbarians in the town love the cake – along with beer – so much that they come to the bar every day. They stop behaving barbarically, and go to a barber, who shaves them.

The lyrics also make references to Barbapapa, a French children's book character, the song Aberakadabera by the Austrian band Erste Allgemeine Verunsicherung, and the nonsense verse German children's song Drei Chinesen mit dem Kontrabass.

Numerous variations on the video were created by other people. Two young Australian women named Stephanie and Christina made a video in which they danced to the song, which got over 15 million views. After multiple other dance versions were created by other people, Wartke and Fischer posted their own dance version. The popularity of the videos has been attributed in part to the decision of the Universal Music Group to stop releasing their content to TikTok, creating an opening for unaffiliated contributors.

In 2024, Wartke and Fischer released a "Part 2" of the song and video. Similar in style to the original, the lyrics describe a bisexual relationship between Barbara and a woman named Bärbel, who get married in the bar, and have a baby named Emily.

It was featured in October 2025 as an "Icon Series" emote in Fortnite.

== Cultural context ==
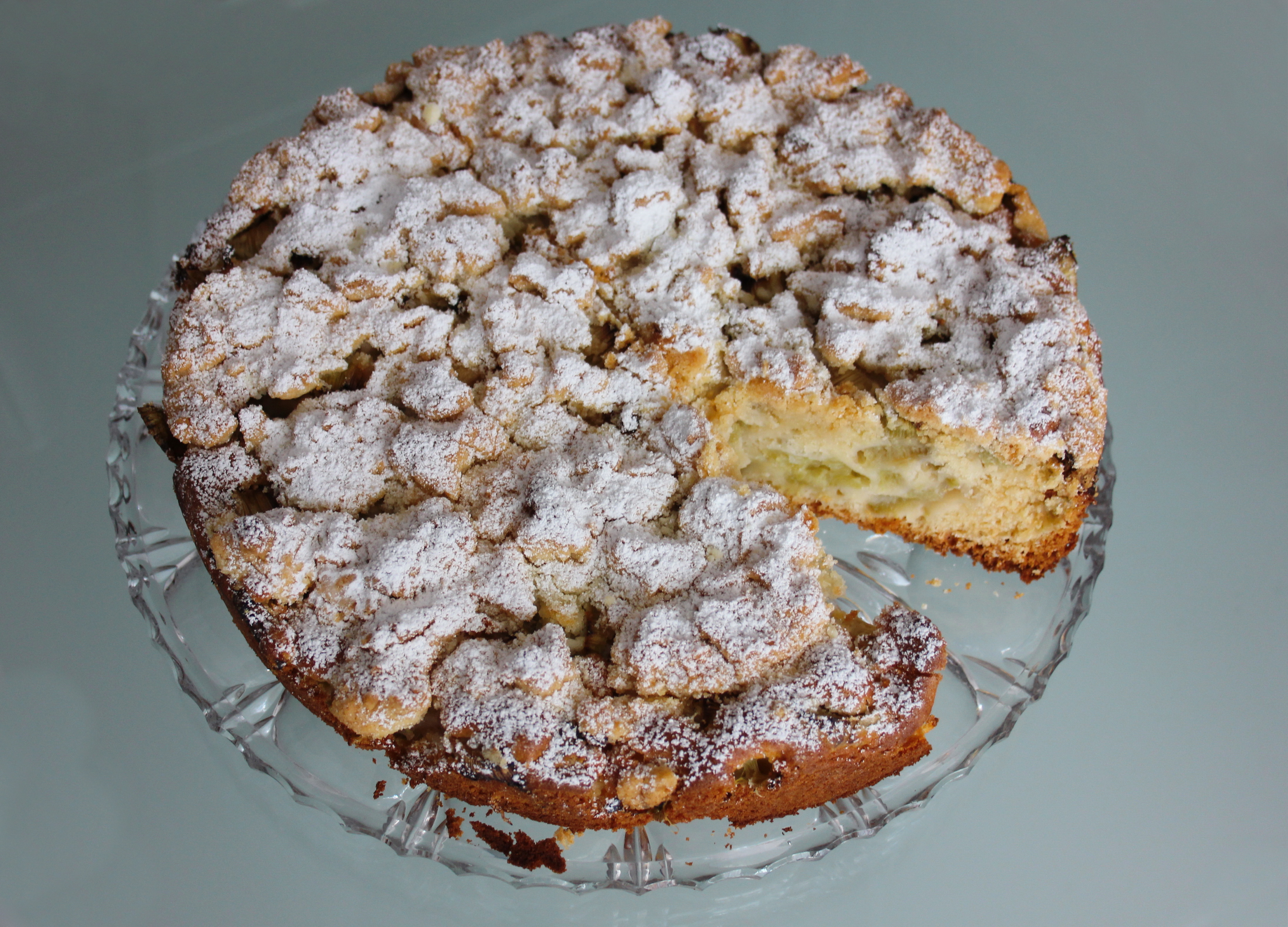
Rhubarb streuselkuchen

Audrey Morgan writes that, contrary to some inaccurate English translations of the song lyrics, the rhubarb dessert in the song would not, in German culture, be a rhubarb pie; rather, it would likely be a kuchen-like cake, probably with a streusel topping (streuselkuchen).

Sarah Maslin Nir places the craze over the video in the context of rhubarb's place in springtime seasonal cuisine in Germany. Rhubarb, along with strawberries and white asparagus, are treated as cause for merriment. Tobias Hagge, another German musical comedian, notes that there was also a song popular around 1930, about a woman named Veronika, whose ability to make asparagus grow gives rise to a double entendre.
