= Marry Me (1932 film) =

1932 film

- Directed by: Wilhelm Thiele
- Written by: Ernst Angel; Anthony Asquith; Desmond Carter; Frank Eyton; Robert Gilbert; Angus MacPhail; Armin Robinson; Franz Schulz; István Zágon (play)
- Produced by: Michael Balcon
- Starring: Renate Müller; Harry Green; George Robey
- Edited by: Ian Dalrymple
- Music by: Michael Krausz
- Production company: Gainsborough Pictures
- Distributed by: Ideal Films
- Release date: 1932
- Running time: 75 minutes
- Country: United Kingdom
- Language: English

Marry Me is a 1932 British musical comedy film directed by Wilhelm Thiele and starring Renate Müller, Harry Green and George Robey.

A separate German-language version, Girls to Marry, was made, also directed by Thiele and starring Müller, but with an otherwise different cast.

== Cast ==
- Renate Müller as Ann Linden
- Harry Green as Sigurd Bernstein
- George Robey as Aloysius Novak
- Ian Hunter as Robert Hart
- Maurice Evans as Paul Hart
- Billy Caryll as Meyer
- Charles Hawtrey as Billy Hart
- Charles Carson as Korten
- Viola Lyel as Frau Krause
- Sunday Wilshin as Ida Brun
- Roland Culver as Tailor (uncredited)
- Brian Lawrance as Singer (uncredited)

== Production ==
It was made by Gainsborough Pictures at Islington Studios. The film's sets were designed by the art director Alex Vetchinsky.
