= Bodo Wartke =

German cabaret artist, pianist and singer-songwriter

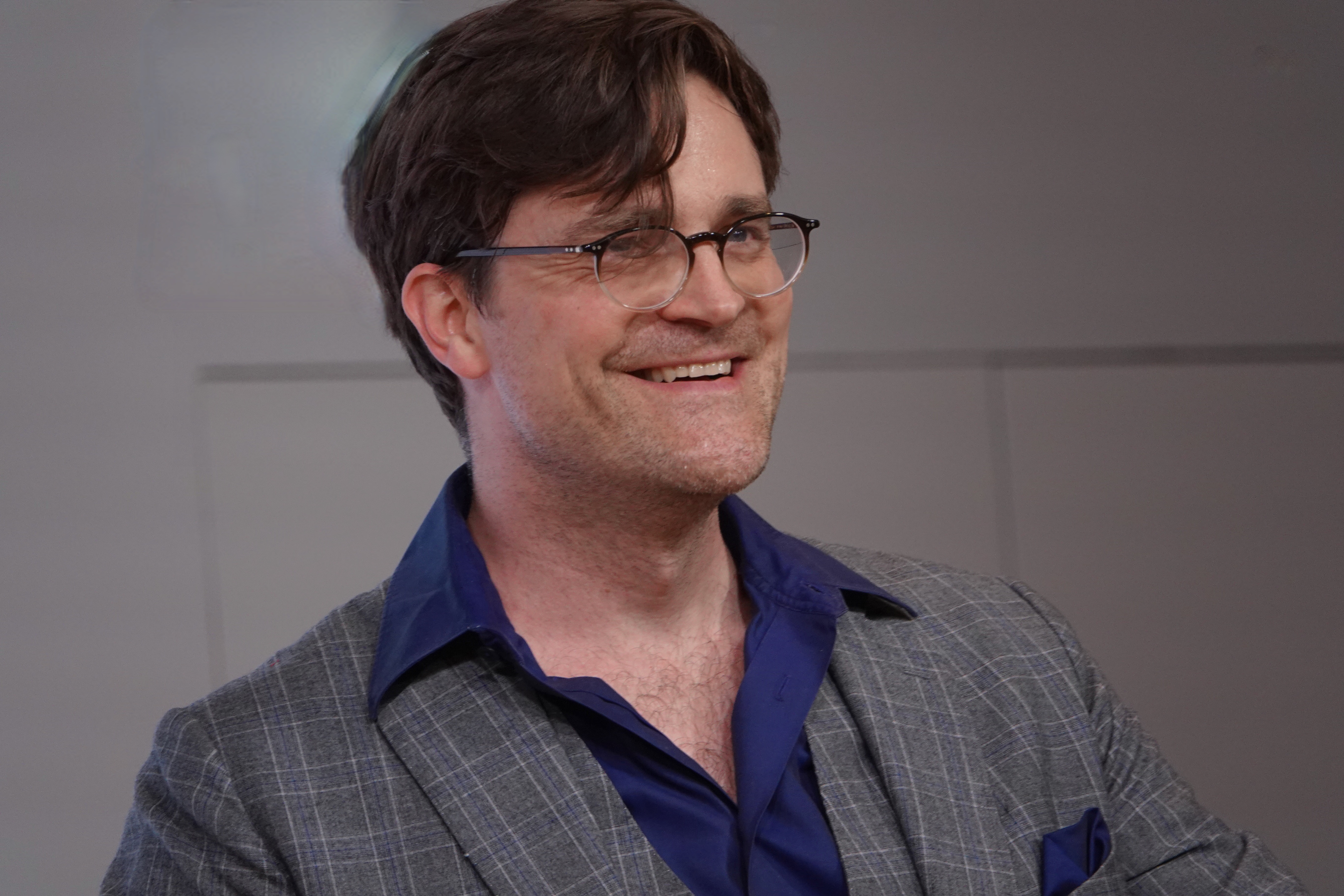
- Wartke in 2022
- Born: 21 May 1977 (age 49); Hamburg, West Germany
- Occupations: Cabaret artist, pianist, singer-songwriter, actor
- Years active: 1996–present
- Website: Official website

Bodo Wartke (born 21 May 1977) is a German musical cabaret artist, pianist, singer-songwriter and actor. He is known for his piano-based cabaret programmes, rhymed theatre adaptations and linguistic wordplay. In 2024, he gained international recognition through the viral novelty song Barbara's Rhubarb Bar, created with music producer Marti Fischer.

== Early life and education ==
Wartke was born in Hamburg and grew up in Reinbek and Bad Schwartau. He completed his Abitur at the Leibniz-Gymnasium in Bad Schwartau in 1996 and subsequently performed civilian service at the Städtisches Krankenhaus Süd in Lübeck.

In 1997, he began studying physics in Berlin, but changed after two semesters to music education at the Berlin University of the Arts. From 1998 to 2004, he was a member of SAGO, the academy for poetry and music founded by Christof Stählin, and he is a graduate of the Celler Schule.

Wartke lives in Berlin-Kreuzberg and has one son.

== Career ==
=== Musical cabaret ===
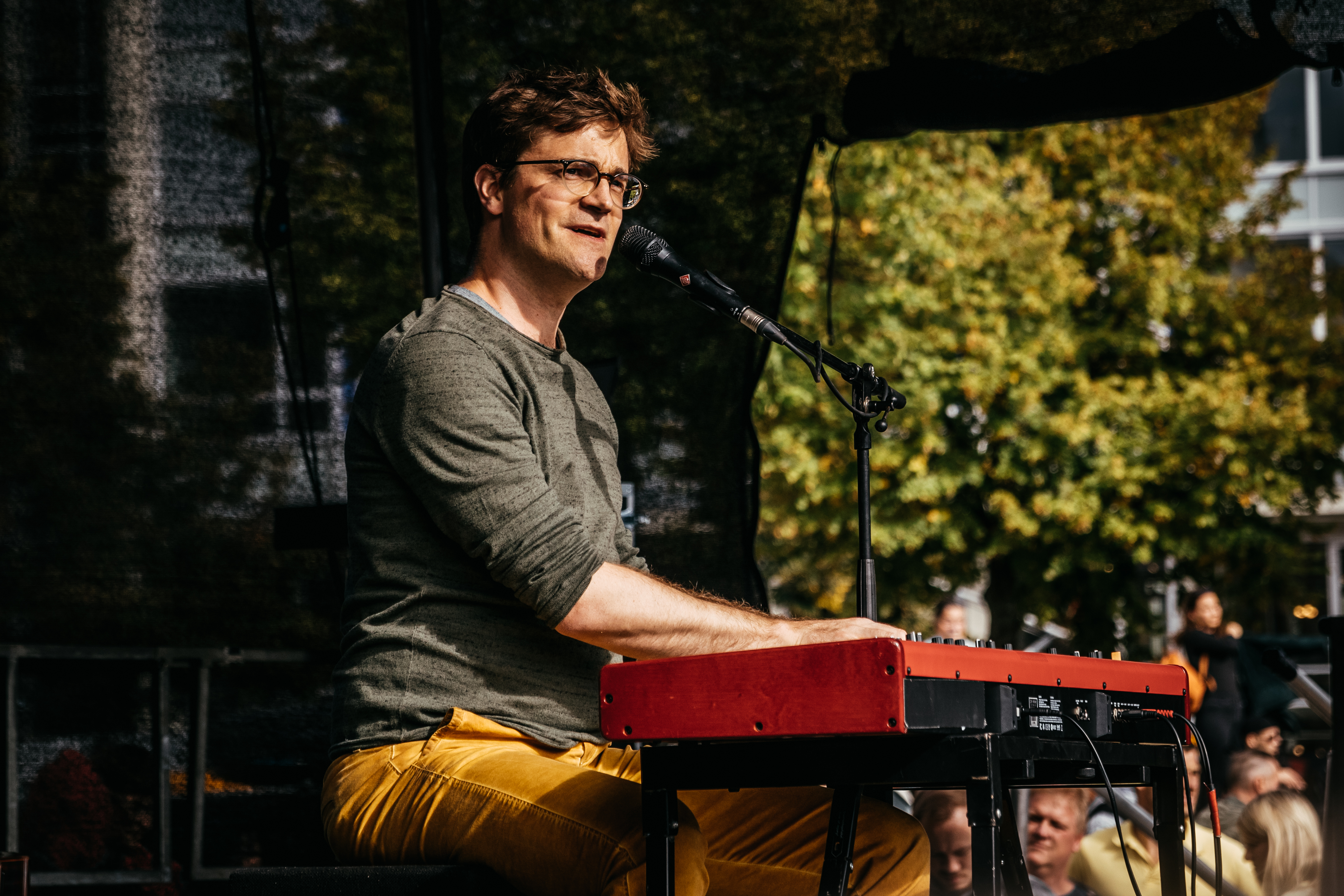
Wartke at a climate strike in Leipzig in 2019

Wartke gave his first full-length concert on 16 November 1996 at his former school. He became known as a musical cabaret artist who usually accompanies himself on the grand piano. In addition to piano, he also uses instruments such as the ukulele, cajón and harmonica. His lyrics are mostly in German and are characterized by rhyme, humour, satire and wordplay.

He has created several full-length piano cabaret programmes, including Ich denke, also sing ich, Achillesverse, Noah war ein Archetyp, Klaviersdelikte, Was, wenn doch?, Wandelmut and Wunderpunkt. He tours regularly in the German-speaking world and performs several programmes in parallel.

A recurring topic in Wartke's songs is love, treated both humorously and seriously. One of his best-known pieces is Liebeslied, a song consisting of short stanzas in many languages. By 2011, Wartke had 88 language versions in his repertoire, including German dialects and constructed languages such as Esperanto, Sindarin, Quenya and Klingon.

His songs also address political and social topics. Nicht in meinem Namen criticizes religious extremism, while Hambacher Wald opposes the clearing of the Hambach Forest.

=== Classical music and theatre ===
Classical music is a recurring element in Wartke's work. His programme Noah war ein Archetyp includes Alla Turca Stomp, an adaptation of Mozart's rondo from the Piano Sonata No. 11. His programmes also include references to works by Wolfgang Amadeus Mozart, Ludwig van Beethoven, Arnold Schoenberg, Friedrich Schiller and Johann Wolfgang von Goethe.

Wartke has also written and performed modern rhymed adaptations of Greek tragedies. His one-man play König Ödipus, based on the myth of Oedipus, premiered in 2009. His adaptation of Antigone, written with Carmen Kalisch and director Sven Schütze, premiered at the Schmidt Theater in Hamburg on 9 April 2018 and was performed by Wartke and Melanie Haupt.

The filmed version of Antigone was released in 2019 and received the rating besonders wertvoll from the Deutsche Film- und Medienbewertung. The adaptation was later used in teaching material published by the Westermann Gruppe.

=== Orchestra and band projects ===
In 2012, Wartke began performing Swingende Notwendigkeit, a swing programme with The Capital Dance Orchestra. In 2021, he performed Jetzt oder Sinfonie! with the WDR Funkhausorchester, which was released as a live album.

Since 2022, Wartke has also toured with the SchönenGutenA-Band, whose members had collaborated with him since the programme Noah war ein Archetyp.

=== Barbara's Rhubarb Bar ===
In late 2023, Wartke and music producer Marti Fischer created the novelty song Barbara's Rhubarb Bar (German: Barbaras Rhabarberbar), based on a German tongue twister. Wartke wrote the lyrics, while Fischer produced the music.

The song became an international viral phenomenon in 2024, especially on TikTok, where it inspired a dance trend. The New York Times reported that the music video received more than 47 million TikTok views within a few months and briefly ranked above Beyoncé on some streaming music charts. The trend was also covered by international media including Sky News and Forbes.

The single reached number 16 on the German Single Trending Charts on 24 May 2024.

== Other activities ==
In 2005, Wartke and his long-time collaborator Sven Schütze founded the music publishing company Reimkultur Musikverlag, after several labels had declined to represent him.

From 2006 to 2011, Wartke hosted the songwriter festival Songs an einem Sommerabend, broadcast by Bayerischer Rundfunk. He later also hosted Lieder auf Banz, the successor festival held at Banz Abbey.

As a composer and musical director, he worked on a Hamburg production of Dylan Thomas's Under Milk Wood. He also wrote a German libretto for Jacques Offenbach's operetta Orpheus in the Underworld, lyrics for Roger Cicero's song Der Anruf on the album Beziehungsweise, and the song … da wird auch dein Herz sein for the 33rd German Evangelical Church Assembly in Dresden.

In 2023, Wartke reached new audiences on social media with Zungenbrecher 4.0, a rap-like series of German tongue twisters. The piece Der dicke Dachdecker became popular on TikTok and Instagram, and the series had reportedly reached 84 million views by October 2023.

In May 2024 and May 2025, Wartke appeared in episodes of the ZDF political satire programme Die Anstalt.

== Awards ==
Wartke has received numerous awards for cabaret, chanson and songwriting, including:

- 1998: St. Ingberter Pfanne, first prize and audience award
- 2000: Bielefelder Kabarettpreis, first prize
- 2001: Das Schwarze Schaf, first prize
- 2001: Bundeswettbewerb Gesang, first prize in the chanson category
- 2004: Deutscher Kleinkunstpreis, chanson/music/song category
- 2023: Deutscher Sprachpreis of the Henning-Kaufmann-Stiftung
- 2024: Bayerischer Kabarettpreis, music award
- 2025: Fred Jay Preis
- 2026: Salzburger Stier

== Selected works ==
=== Stage programmes ===
- Ich denke also sing ich
- Achillesverse
- Noah war ein Archetyp
- König Ödipus
- Klaviersdelikte
- Swingende Notwendigkeit
- Was, wenn doch?
- Antigone
- Wandelmut
- Jetzt oder Sinfonie!
- In guter Begleitung
- Wunderpunkt

=== Books ===
- Ich denke also sing ich – Notenbuch. Reimkultur, 2005.
- Achillesverse – Notenbuch. Reimkultur, 2006.
- Noah war ein Archetyp – Notenbuch. Reimkultur, 2008.
- Bodo Wartke, Sven Schütze, Carmen Kalisch: König Ödipus – Stücktext. Reimkultur, 2009. ISBN 978-3-941439-05-4.
- Klaviersdelikte – Notenbuch. Reimkultur, 2012.
- Einfach machen – Klavierfibel. Reimkultur, 2015.
- Was, wenn doch? – Notenbuch. Reimkultur, 2016.
- Bodo Wartke, Sven Schütze, Carmen Kalisch: Antigone – Taschenbuch. Nach dem antiken Drama von Sophokles. Reimkultur, 2018. ISBN 978-3-941439-20-7.
- Bodo Wartke, Sven Schütze, Carmen Kalisch: Antigone – Textheft. Nach dem antiken Drama von Sophokles. Reimkultur, 2018. ISBN 978-3-941439-36-8.
- Wandelmut – Notenbuch. Reimkultur, 2020.
- Wunderpunkt – Notenbuch. Reimkultur, 2025.
- Bodo Wartke: In Barbaras Rhabarberbar wird niemals der Rhabarber rar – Zungenbrechergeschichten. Illustrated by Alexandra Junge. Carlsen, 2025. ISBN 978-3-551-55962-3.
