= Rudolf Österreicher =

Austrian writer (1881–1966)

Rudolf Österreicher, also Rudolf Oesterreicher, (19 July 1881 in Vienna – 23 October 1966 in idem) was an Austrian writer, librettist, comedy author, author of cabaret texts and biographer. From 1945 to 1947 he was director of the Wiener Stadttheater.

== Works ==
Comedies:

- 1907: Gummiradler
- 1912: Das Bett Napoleons
- 1913: Der Herr ohne Wohnung (with Bela Jenbach)
- 1926: Der Garten Eden (with Rudolf Bernauer) - English-language adaptation: The Garden of Eden
- 1927: Das zweite Leben (with Rudolf Bernauer)
- 1928: Geld auf der Straße (with Rudolf Bernauer)
- 1929: Die Sachertorte (with Siegfried Geyer)
- 1930: Das Konto X (with Rudolf Bernauer)

Operettas:

- 1910: Ihr Adjutant; music by Robert Winterberg
- 1914: Das Mädchen im Mond, libretto with Wilhelm Sterk; music by Karl von Stigler
- 1917: Zsuzsi kisasszony, libretto with Alfred Maria Willner (based on Ferenc Martos and Miksa Bródy); music by Emmerich Kálmán
- 1919: Der Künstlerpreis, libretto with Julius Horst; music by Leo Ascher
- 1923: Katja, die Tänzerin, libretto with Leopold Jacobson; music by Jean Gilbert
- 1924: Das Weib im Purpur, libretto with Leopold Jacobson; music by Jean Gilbert
- 1924: Die Geliebte Seiner Hoheit, libretto with Rudolf Bernauer; music by Jean Gilbert
- 1926: Der Mitternachtswalzer, with Alfred Maria Willner; music by Robert Stolz
- 1927: Yvette und ihre Freunde, libretto with Wilhelm Sterk; music by Michael Krasznay-Krausz
- 1927: Eine einzige Nacht, libretto with Leopold Jacobson; music by Robert Stolz
- 1949: Abschiedswalzer, libretto with Hubert Marischka; music by Ludwig Schmidseder

Adaptation:

- Das Spitzentuch der Königin (Johann Strauss)

== Filmography ==
- The Gentleman Without a Residence, directed by Fritz Freund (Austria, 1915, based on the play Der Herr ohne Wohnung)
- The Gentleman Without a Residence, directed by Heinrich Bolten-Baeckers (Germany, 1925, based on the play Der Herr ohne Wohnung)
- The Garden of Eden, directed by Lewis Milestone (1928, based on the play Der Garten Eden)
- The Beloved of His Highness, directed by Luise Fleck and Jacob Fleck (Germany, 1928, based on the operetta Die Geliebte Seiner Hoheit)
- Three Sinners, directed by Rowland V. Lee (1928, based on the play Das zweite Leben)
- Der Mitternachtswalzer, directed by Heinz Paul (Austria, 1929, based on the operetta Der Mitternachtswalzer)
- Money on the Street, directed by Georg Jacoby (Germany, 1930, based on the play Geld auf der Straße)
- Die Faschingsfee, directed by Hans Steinhoff (Germany, 1931, based on the operetta Zsuzsi kisasszony)
- Once a Lady, directed by Guthrie McClintic (1931, based on the play Das zweite Leben)
- The Office Manager, directed by Hans Behrendt (Germany, 1931, based on the play Das Konto X)
- Her Majesty, Love, directed by William Dieterle (1931, remake of the 1931 film Her Majesty the Barmaid)
- The Gentleman Without a Residence, directed by E. W. Emo (Austria, 1934, based on the play Der Herr ohne Wohnung)
- Who's Your Lady Friend?, directed by Carol Reed (UK, 1937, based on the play Der Herr ohne Wohnung)
- Ducháček Will Fix It, directed by Karel Lamač (Czechoslovakia, 1938, based on the play Das Konto X)
- Trees Are Blooming in Vienna, directed by Hans Wolff (Austria, 1958, based on the play Die Sachertorte)
- Das Geld liegt auf der Straße, directed by Klaus Überall (West Germany, 1966, TV film, based on the play Geld auf der Straße)

=== Screenwriter ===
- Hampels Abenteuer (dir. Richard Oswald, 1915, Germany)
- Her Majesty the Barmaid (dir. Joe May, 1931, German)
- His Highness Love (dir. Robert Péguy, Erich Schmidt, and Joe May, 1931, French)
- Hirsekorn greift ein (dir. Rudolf Bernauer, 1931, Germany)
- The Magic Top Hat (dir. Rudolf Bernauer, 1932, Germany)
- Ende schlecht, alles gut (dir. Fritz Schulz, 1934, Hungary; German-language adaptation of the 1934 film Helyet az öregeknek)
- Kissing Is No Sin (dir. Hubert Marischka, 1950, Austria/West Germany)
- The Merry Farmer (dir. Georg Marischka, 1951, Austria)
- Hello Porter (dir. Franz Antel, 1952, Austria)
- Rose of the Mountain (dir. Hubert Marischka, 1952, West Germany)
- A Night in Venice (dir. Georg Wildhagen, 1953, Austria)
- Die Perle von Tokay (dir. Hubert Marischka, 1954, Austria)
- Brillanten aus Wien (dir. Rolf Kutschera, TV film, 1959, Austria/West Germany)
- Die Gigerln von Wien (dir. Wolfgang Glück, TV film, 1965, Austria)

== Sources ==
- Christian Fastl: Oesterreicher (Österreicher), Rudolf. In Oesterreichisches Musiklexikon. Inline-edition, Vienna 2002 ff., ISBN 3-7001-3077-5; Druckausgabe: Volume 4, edition of the Austrian Academy of Sciences, Vienna 2005, ISBN 3-7001-3046-5.
- Rudolf Oesterreicher in Vienna History Wiki
