= Money on the Street =

1930 film

- German film poster
- German: Geld auf der Straße
- Directed by: Georg Jacoby
- Written by: Friedrich Raff; Julius Urgiß
- Based on: Geld auf der Straße (play) by: Rudolf Bernauer; Rudolf Österreicher
- Produced by: Nicolas Deutsch
- Starring: Lydia Pollman; Georg Alexander; Franz Schafheitlin; Leopold Kramer
- Cinematography: Nicolas Farkas
- Edited by: Else Baum
- Music by: Stefan Weiß
- Production companies: Felsom Film; Sascha Film
- Distributed by: Felsom-Film
- Release date: 11 November 1930
- Running time: 85 minutes
- Countries: Austria; Germany
- Language: German

Money on the Street (German: Geld auf der Straße) is a 1930 Austrian-German romantic comedy film directed by Georg Jacoby and starring Lydia Pollman, Georg Alexander, and Franz Schafheitlin. It is notable for the screen debut of Hedy Lamarr, who made a short appearance as an extra, and of Rosa Albach-Retty.

== Plot ==
A young woman tries to escape her fate of marriage to a dull, but wealthy fiancée.

== Cast ==
- Lydia Pollman as Dodo
- Georg Alexander as Peter Paul Lutz
- Franz Schafheitlin as Bornhausen
- Leopold Kramer as Emil Reimbacher
- Rosa Albach-Retty as Lona Reimbacher
- Hans Moser as Albin Jensch
- Hugo Thimig, as Max Kesselberg
- Hans Thimig, as Max Kesselberg
- Alfred Neugebauer as Policeman
- Karl Ziegler as Dallibor
- Harry Payer as Sänger in der Carlton-Bar
- Ernst Arnold as Lukas
- Wilhelm Heim as bookkeeper
- Franz Kammauf as manager
- Hedy Lamarr as young woman at night club table
- Rose Mathe as Tschakowa
- Hermann Wawra as Head waiter
- Karl Kneidinger

== Production ==
The film was made by Sascha Film, Austria's largest production company, at the Sievering Studios in Vienna. It was the first sound film made in Austria, facilitated by an agreement made with the German firm Tobis Film who supplied the sound recording equipment. The story was adapted from a play by Rudolf Bernauer. The film's art direction was by Hans Jacoby and Emil Stepanek.
