= Michael Krasznay-Krausz =

Austrian-Hungarian composer (1897–1940)

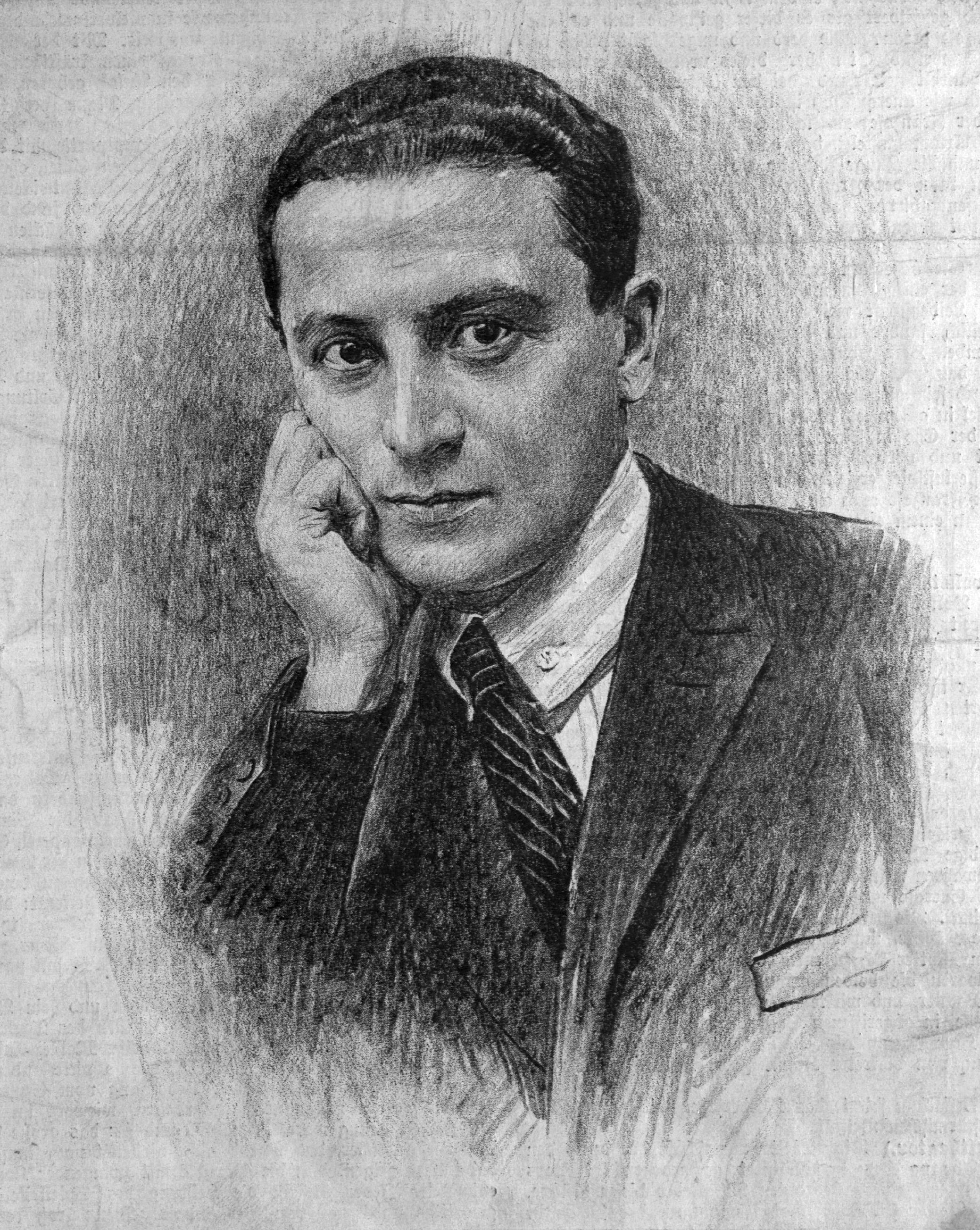
- Michael Krasznay-Krausz
- Born: 11 April 1897; Pancsova, Austria-Hungary
- Died: 3 November 1940 (aged 43); Budapest, Hungary
- Resting place: Kozma Street Jewish Cemetery
- Education: Budapest Academy of Music

Michael Krasznay-Krausz (also known as Michael Krausz; Hungarian: Krasznai Krausz Mihály; 11 April 1897 – 3 November 1940) was a Hungarian–Austrian composer.

He was born in Pancsova, Austria-Hungary (present-day Pančevo, Serbia), and died in Budapest.

== Life ==
Krasznay-Krausz was born into a Jewish family; his father owned a gramophone factory. He began composing at the age of 13. He studied counterpoint and composition at the Budapest Academy of Music under Victor von Herzfeld, as one of his first students, and also studied with Zoltán Kodály.

In 1919, his opera Mariká premiered at the Hungarian State Opera in Budapest. He subsequently moved to Vienna, where he initially focused on symphonic and operatic works before turning to operetta in 1923. His first operetta, Bajazzos Abenteuer (Bajazzo's Adventures), premiered on 22 December 1923 at the Johann Strauss Theatre in Vienna. Another operetta, A Woman with Style, starring Fritzi Massary, was a major success in Berlin in 1927.

In the early 1930s, Krasznay-Krausz moved to Berlin, where his works continued to be staged until he was forced to leave in 1933. In May 1934, he was accused of plagiarism by Paul Abraham in connection with his operetta Die gelbe Lilie (The Yellow Lily). He demonstrated that he had composed the work in August 1932, and the dispute was resolved amicably. Die gelbe Lilie premiered in Budapest on 5 January 1934 and in Vienna on 24 May, receiving 20 performances in Budapest.

In 1938, following the success of his so-called "musical crime novel" Dixie, which premiered on 8 February, rehearsals began for a new operetta, Mädel in Gefahr (Girls in Danger), at the Theater an der Wien, with radio broadcasts planned. The Anschluss in March 1938 brought the production to an end; on 17 March, flooding at the theatre further disrupted activities, and Krasznay-Krausz fled to Budapest.

His final operetta, Marion, premiered on 23 March 1940 at the Budapest City Theatre but was not successful. The title role was performed by Emmi Kosáry, who subsequently retired from acting.

Krasznay-Krausz died on 3 November 1940 in Budapest at the age of 43 and was buried in the Kozma Street Jewish Cemetery.

In addition to his operas and operettas, he was also known for composing numerous popular songs, particularly in the Schlager genre.

== Awards ==
- 1916: Haynald Prize (Hungary) for the best Mass

== Works ==
=== Operas ===
- Marika (libretto by Imre Földes), premiered 22 May 1919 at the Hungarian State Opera, Budapest.
- Táncosnő (Dancer), after Melchior Lengyel, premiered 1921.

=== Operettas ===
- Bajazzos Abenteuer (Nur ein Bajazzo!) (text: Ludwig Staerk and Adolf Eisler), premiered 22 December 1923, Johann Strauß-Theater, Vienna.
- Pusztaliebchen (text: Wilhelm Sterk), premiered 19 December 1924, Johann Strauß-Theater, Vienna.
- Glück in der Liebe (text: Julius Horst and Peter Herz), premiered 25 February 1927, Johann Strauß-Theater, Vienna.
- Eine Frau von Format (text: Rudolph Schanzer and Ernst Welisch), premiered 21 September 1927, Theater des Westens, Berlin; French version (La Femme sans voile: Robert de Machiels and André Mauprey), premiered 3 March 1931, Théâtre des Célestins, Lyon; Hungarian version (A fenséges asszony: Andor Szenes), premiered 31 January 1934, City Theatre, Budapest.
- Yvette und ihre Freunde (text: Rudolf Österreicher and Wilhelm Sterk), premiered 18 November 1927, Bürgertheater, Vienna.
- Die Frau in Gold (text: Leopold Jacobson and Bruno Hardt-Warden), premiered 28 February 1929, Neues Operetten-Theater, Leipzig.
- Der treue Musikant (Das Herrgottslied) (text: Bruno Hardt-Warden; song texts: Fritz Rotter and Bruno Hardt-Warden), premiered 21 November 1930, Neues Wiener Schauspielhaus.
- Arrangement of Sigmund Romberg's The Student Prince as Der Studentenprinz (German text: Rudolph Schanzer and Ernst Welisch), premiered 22 October 1932, Großes Schauspielhaus, Berlin.
- Die Lindenwirtin (based on the sound film of the same name; text: Rudolph Schanzer and Ernst Welisch; song texts: Bruno Hardt-Warden), premiered 30 March 1933, Metropol-Theater, Berlin.
- Papucs (after Pantoufle by Marcel Gerbidon and Paul Armont; Hungarian text: Andor Szenes), premiered 18 November 1933, Pesti Színház, Budapest.
- Sárga liliom (after Sárga liliom by Lajos Biró; text: Géza Herczeg in cooperation with Karl Farkas), premiered 5 January 1934, Stadttheater (later Erkel Theatre), Budapest; German version Die gelbe Lilie. Ungarische Rhapsodie premiered 24 May 1934, Theater an der Wien, Vienna.
- Eva im Pelz (text: Ludwig Herzer), premiered 14 June 1935.
- Arrangement of Leo Fall's Der süße Kavalier as Der junge Herr René (text: Ernst Welisch), 1935.
- Eső után köpönyeg (Cry Over Spilt Milk) (text: Mihály Szécsén and Stephan Békeffi), premiered 6 November 1936, Andrássy úti színház, Budapest.
- Black Butterfly (after Melchior Lengyel; text: Géza Herczeg and Henry Gilbert; song texts: Robert Gilbert), 1936.
- Verzeih, daß ich dich lieb (text: Stephan Békeffi, Karl Farkas, and Ludwig Herzer; song texts: Karl Farkas), premiered 1 March 1937, Scala, Vienna.
- Dixie: ein musikalischer Kriminalroman in fünf Kapiteln (text: Karl Farkas and Adolf Schütz), premiered 8 February 1938, Theater an der Wien.
- Mädel in Gefahr (text: Karl Farkas and Adolf Schütz), 1938.
- Marion (text: Maurice Dekobra; Hungarian version: Attila Orbók), premiered 23 March 1940, City Theatre, Budapest.
- Der heimliche Casanova (music by Michael Krasznay-Krausz, compiled posthumously, and Bruno Uher; text: Karl Farkas and Ludwig Herzer), premiered 10 April 1956, Deutsches Theater, Munich.

=== Instrumental music ===
- Nonet for strings and winds

=== Film music ===
- Der Kaufmann von Venedig (The Merchant of Venice), 1923
- Die Lindenwirtin, 1930
- Panic in Chicago, 1931
- Girls to Marry (German: Mädchen zum Heiraten, 1931–32; song texts: Robert Gilbert and Armin L. Robinson)
- Marry Me (British version of Girls to Marry, 1932)
