= A Song for You (film) =

1933 film directed by Joe May

- German: Ein Lied für Dich
- Directed by: Joe May
- Written by: Rudolf Bernauer; Ernst Marischka; Irma von Cube
- Produced by: Fritz Klotzsch; Arnold Pressburger; Gregor Rabinovitch
- Starring: Jan Kiepura; Jenny Jugo; Paul Kemp
- Cinematography: Otto Kanturek; Bruno Timm
- Edited by: Konstantin Mick
- Music by: Walter Jurmann; Bronislau Kaper
- Production companies: Cine-Allianz; UFA
- Distributed by: UFA
- Release date: 15 April 1933
- Running time: 89 minutes
- Country: Germany
- Language: German

A Song for You (German: Ein Lied für Dich) is a 1933 German musical comedy film directed by Joe May and starring Jan Kiepura, Jenny Jugo and Paul Kemp. It was shot at the Babelsberg Studios in Berlin and on location in Naples and Vienna. The film's sets were designed by the art director Werner Schlichting. It was remade in Britain the following year as My Song for You.

== Cast ==
- Jan Kiepura as Riccardo Gatti, opera singer
- Jenny Jugo as Lixie
- Paul Kemp as Charlie, Gatti's impresario
- Ida Wüst as Aunt Ida
- Ralph Arthur Roberts as Baron Kleeberg
- Paul Hörbiger as Schindler
- Jessie Vihrog as Fifi
- Julius Falkenstein as radio clerk
- Hans Junkermann as Mr Hausner, Lixie's father
- Karel Stepanek as Theo Bruckner, musician
- Leonard Steckel as opera director
- Theresa Gerson as Aida in Aida
- Maria Koppenhöfer as Mrs. Vogelmeyer
- Theodor Thony as waiter

== See also ==
- All for Love (1933 film) (Tout pour l'amour, French-language film, 1933)
- My Song for You (film) (English-language film, 1934)

== Bibliography ==
- Klaus, Ulrich J. Deutsche Tonfilme: Jahrgang 1933. Klaus-Archiv, 1988.
