= Streuselkuchen =

Crumbly, yeasty cake

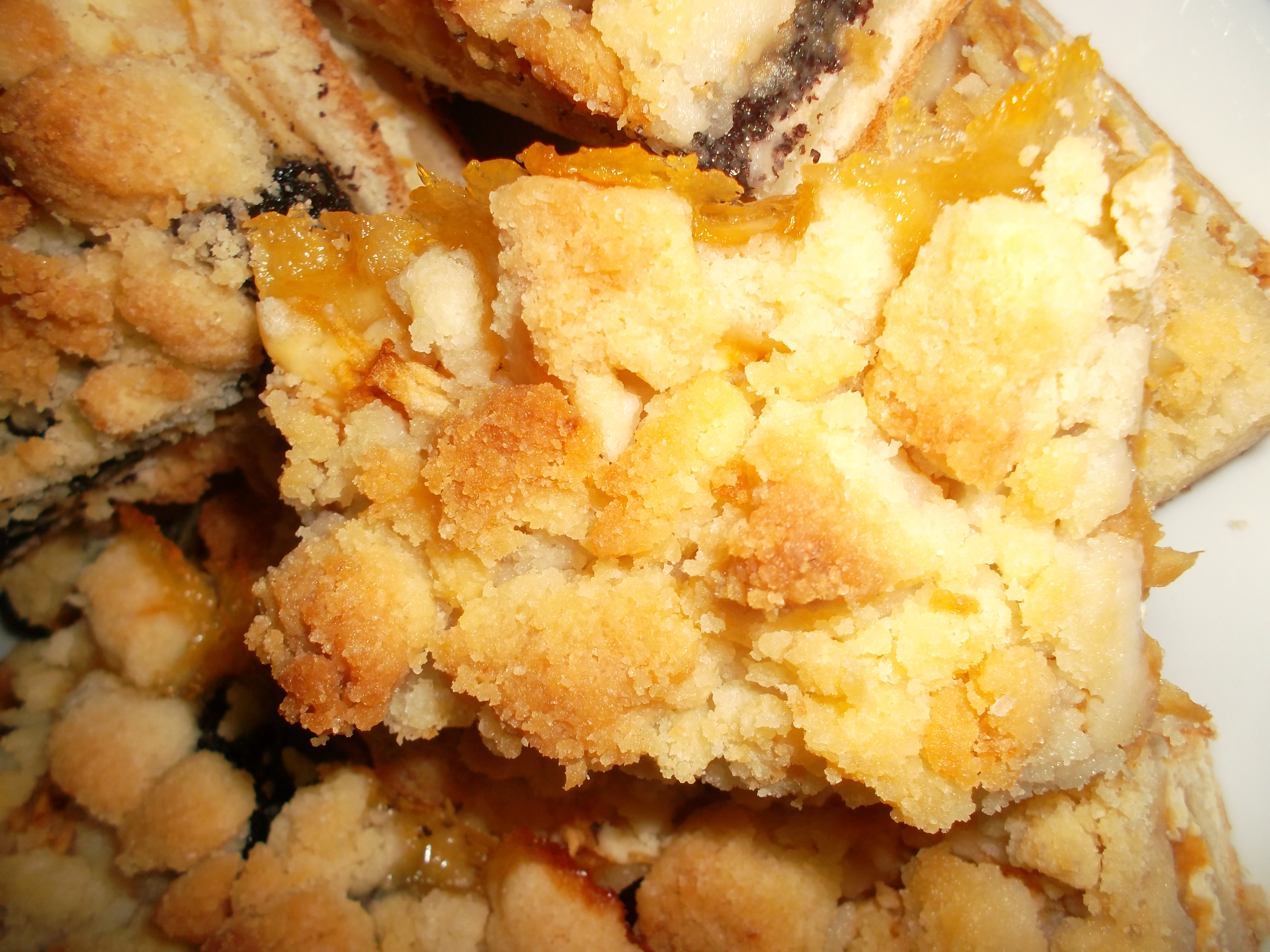
- Type: Cake
- Region or state: Silesia
- Associated cuisine: German, Polish
- Main ingredients: Crumbs: flour, sugar, fat

Streuselkuchen (German pronunciation: [ˈʃtʁɔʏzl̩ˌkuːxn̩]; "crumb cake"), also known in English-speaking countries as crumb cake, is a cake made of yeast dough covered with a sweet crumb topping referred to as streusel. The main ingredients for the crumbs are sugar, butter, and flour, which are mixed at a 1:1:2 ratio. The recipe allegedly originated in the region of Silesia, and is popular in German and Polish cuisines.

A streuselkuchen is usually a flat cake made on a baking tray and cut into oblong pieces. It should be flat – about 1 inch (25 mm) thick – with crumbs making up about half of its height. The original version uses yeast dough, however a short crust is possible. A puff pastry at the bottom turns it into a prasselkuchen.

Many variants of the cake are prepared with fillings such as fruit (mostly of sour taste, e.g. apples, gooseberries, sour cherries, rhubarb), poppy seeds or creme or using a shortening-based dough.

Barbara's Rhubarb Bar is a novelty song about a rhubarb streuselkuchen.

== Gallery ==
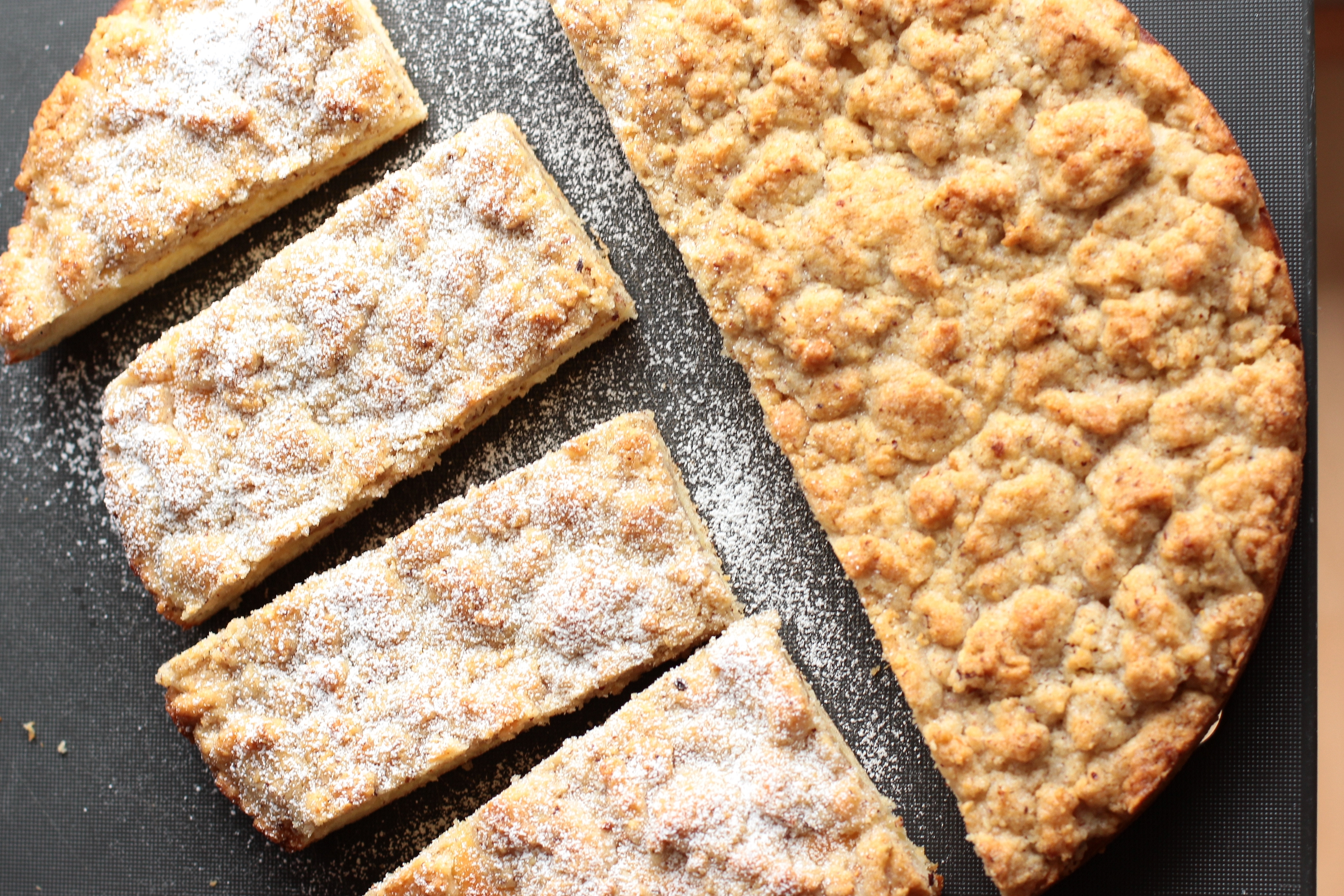
Streuselkuchen with and without powdered sugar

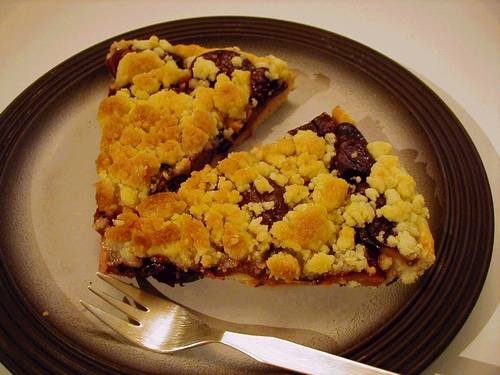
Streuselkuchen with plums

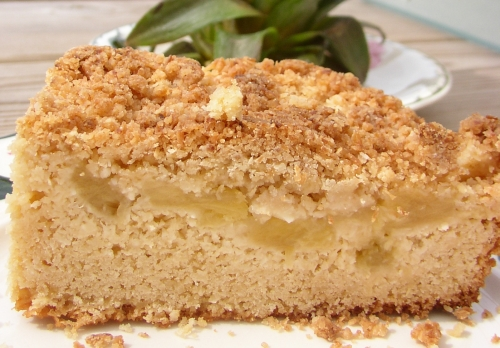
Pineapple coconut streusel cake

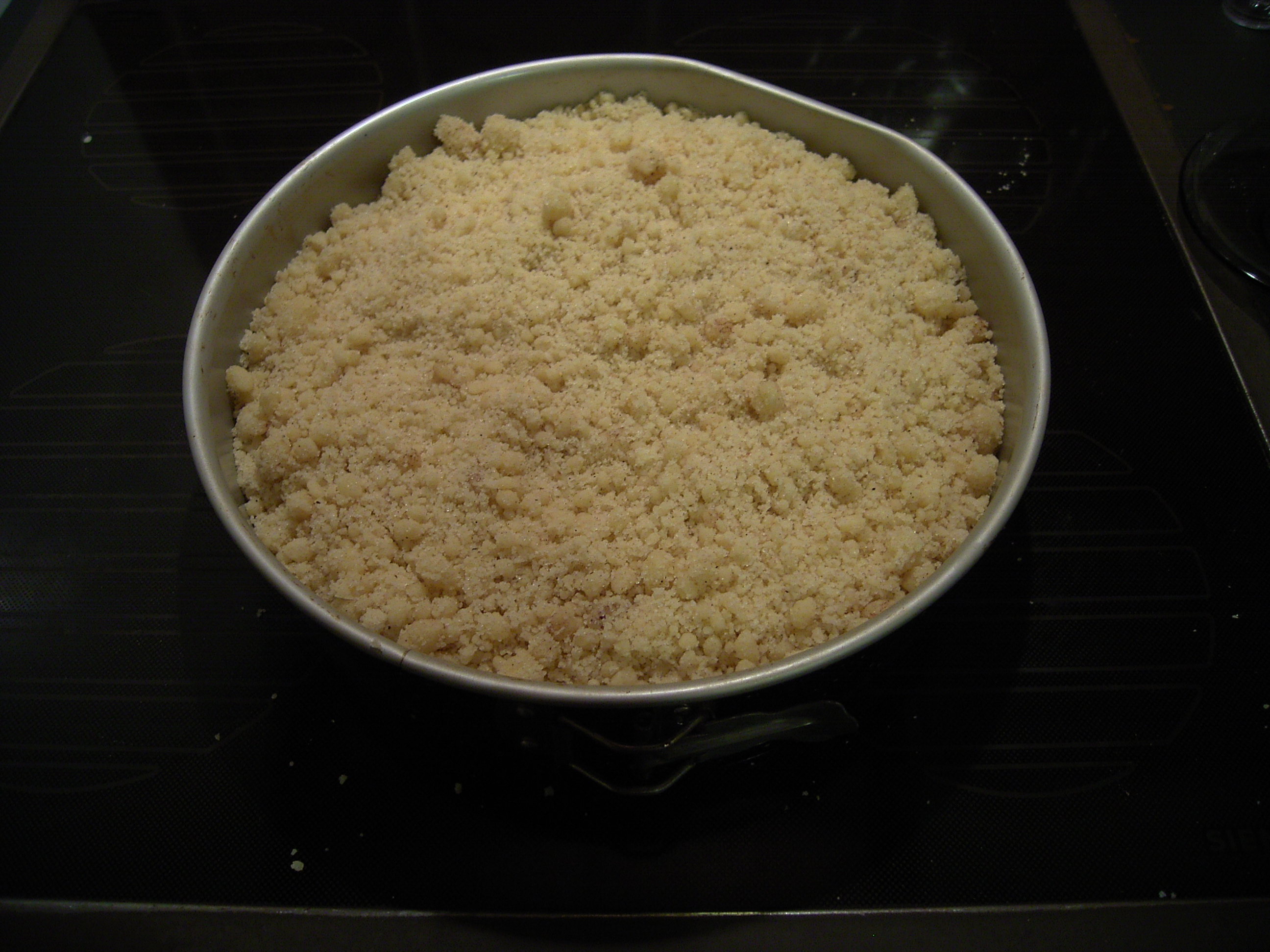
Streusel mixed, before being put on top of a cake and baked

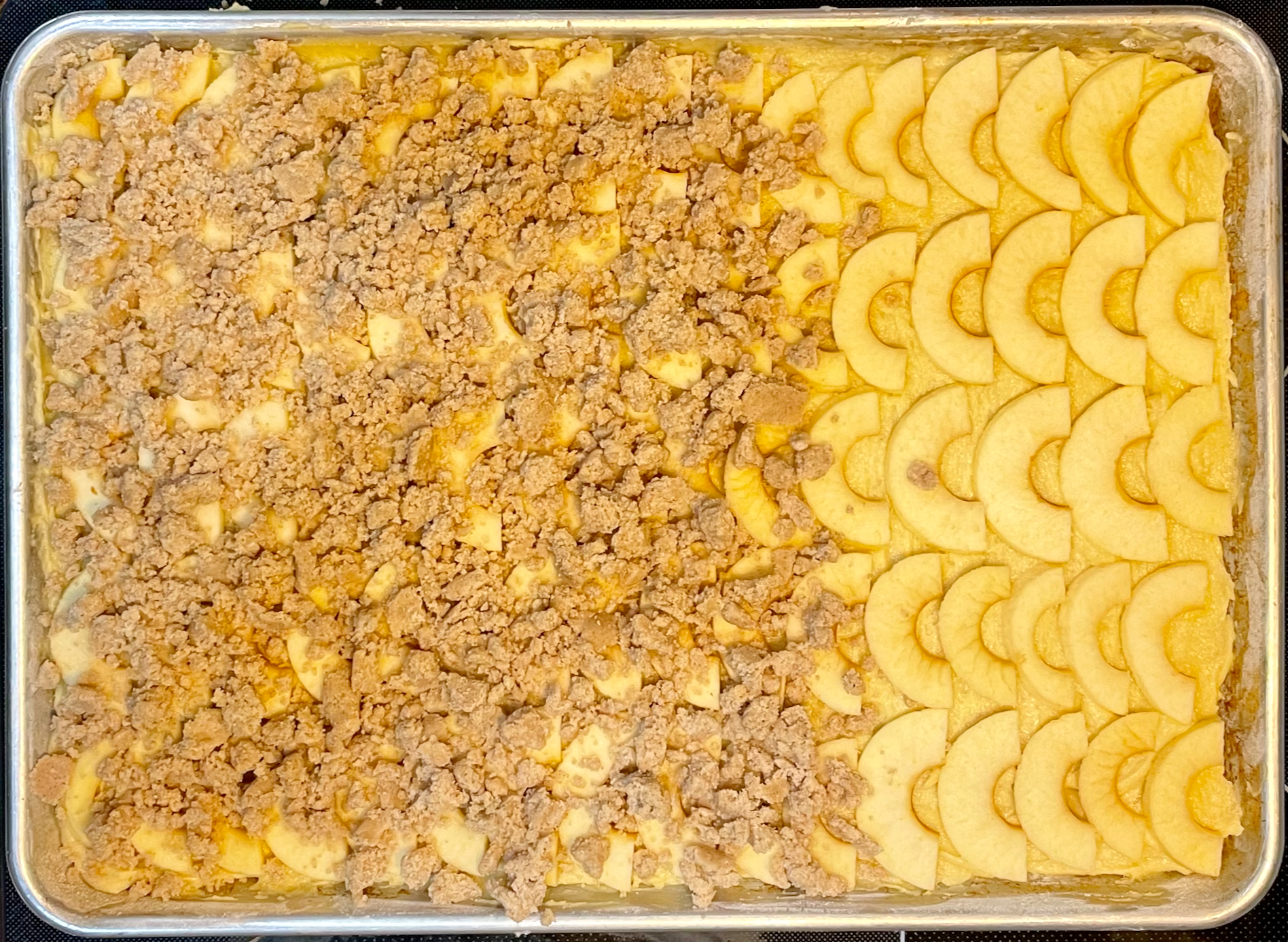
Apple cake, partially covered with streusel before being baked
