= Paganini (operetta) =

1925 operetta in three acts by Franz Lehár

- Operetta by Franz Lehár
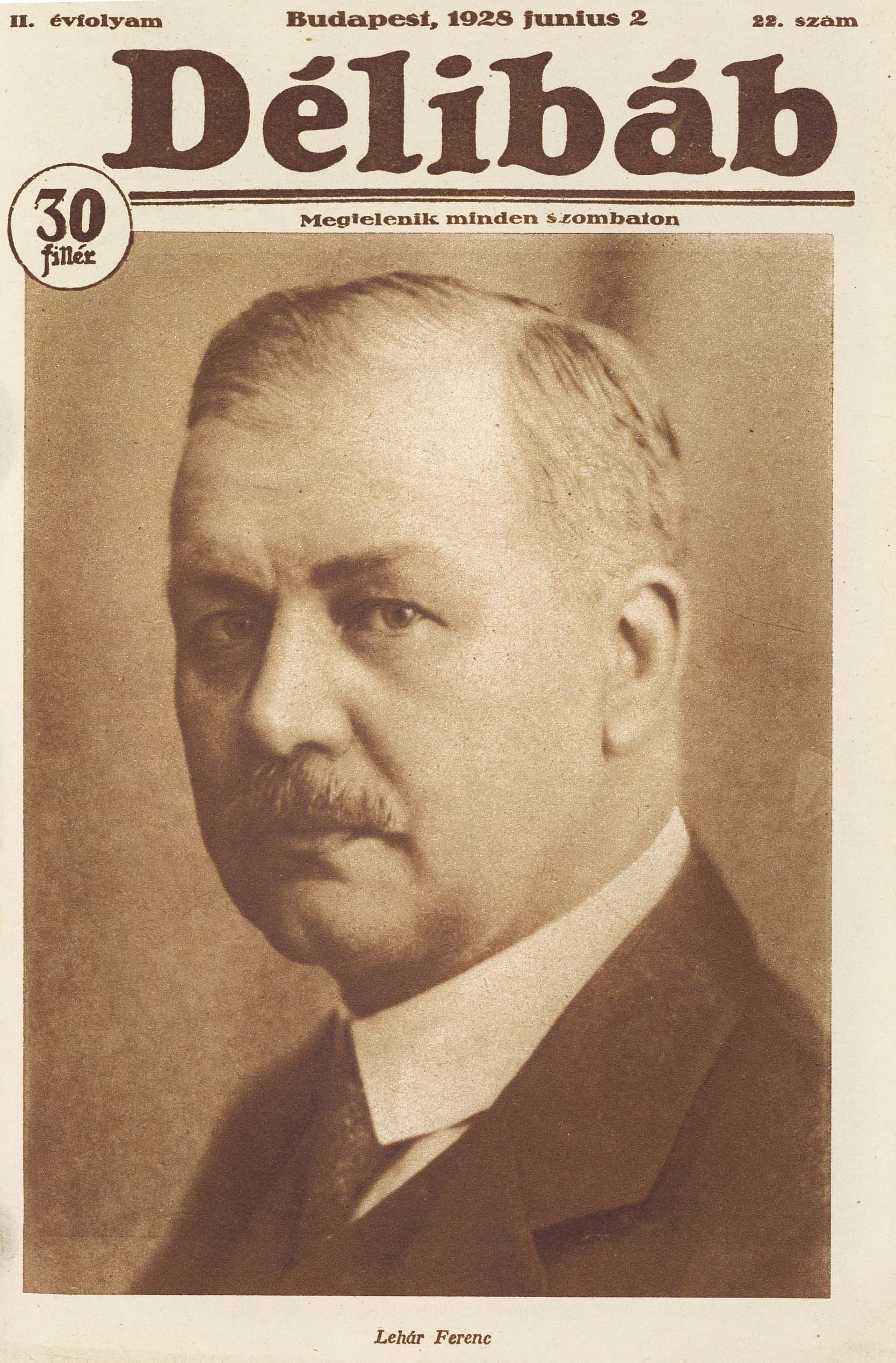
- Franz Lehár, 1928
- Librettist: Paul Knepler
- Language: German
- Premiere: 30 October 1925; Johann Strauss Theater, Vienna

Paganini is an operetta in three acts by Franz Lehár. The German libretto was by Paul Knepler and Bela Jenbach.

== History ==
Lehár composed the work as a vehicle for Richard Tauber, the acclaimed Austrian tenor, though he assumed the role (with Vera Schwarz as the princess) in Berlin on 30 January 1926, rather than the Vienna premiere which was at the Johann Strauss Theater on 30 October 1925 with Carl Clewing in the title role. Tauber's contract with the Berlin State Opera required him to be in Stockholm at the time of the Vienna premiere. The operetta was so coolly received in Vienna that the Berlin impresario, Heinz Saltenberg, was reluctant to mount it at the Deutsches Künstlertheater without guarantees against losses. In the event, Tauber and Schwarz made it a huge success in Berlin, where it ran for three months. It was the first Lehár operetta specially written for Tauber, who had previously appeared in the composer's Zigeunerliebe in 1920 and Frasquita in 1922 with great success. A new production was mounted in Berlin at the Theater des Westens in April 1930, again with Tauber and Schwarz, and the composer conducting at the opening night on Easter Sunday.

An English version with lyrics by A. P. Herbert was presented by C. B. Cochran at the Lyceum Theatre in London in May 1937, with Tauber as Paganini and Evelyn Laye as Anna Elisa. They recorded seven numbers from the show for Parlophone Records, including the new number 'Fear Nothing' that Lehár had written for the London production.

In 1934 the operetta was adapted into a German film Paganini.

== Roles ==
Role	Voice type	Premiere cast, 30 October 1925 (Conductor: Franz Lehár)
Niccolò Paganini, the violinist	tenor	Carl Clewing
Maria Anna Elisa, Princess of Lucca and Piombino, sister of Napoleon	soprano	Emmi Kosáry
Prince Felice Baciocchi, her husband	baritone	Peter Hœnselers
Bella Giretti, a dancer, romantically involved with the prince	soprano	Gisela Kolbe
Giacomo Pimpinelli, court chamberlain to the princess	tenor	Fritz Imhoff
Count Hédouville, a general	tenor	Felix Dombrowski
Bartucci, Paganini's impresario	bass	Max Brod
Countess De Laplace, a court lady	contralto	
Corallina	soprano	
Courtiers, soldiers, peasants, servants etc. (chorus)

== Synopsis ==
Set in Lucca, the story concerns the love affair of Niccolò Paganini, the irresistibly charming violinist, with Élisa Bonaparte, the arts and theatre-loving younger sister of Napoleon.

== Notable arias ==
- "Schönes Italien" (Paganini)
- "Liebe, du Himmel auf Erden" (Maria Anna Elisa)
- "Mit den Frau'n auf Du und Du" (Bella Giretti – Pimpinelli)
- "Niemand liebt dich so wie ich" (Maria Anna Elisa – Paganini)
- "Einmal möcht' ich was Närrisches tun" (Bella Giretti – Pimpinelli)
- "Gern hab ich die Fraun geküsst" (Paganini)
- "Deinen süssen Rosenmund..." (Paganini)
- "Wo meine Wiege stand, ich weiss es nicht" (Maria Anna Elisa)

== Recordings ==
- Lehár: Paganini, Bavarian State Opera Chorus, Bavarian Symphony Orchestra; conductor: Willi Boskovsky; principal singers: Nicolai Gedda, Anneliese Rothenberger, Heinz Zednik, Benno Kusche, Olivera Miljaković, Friedrich Lenz; Recording date: 1977; Label: EMI Classics CD 65968
