= Three Sinners =

1928 film

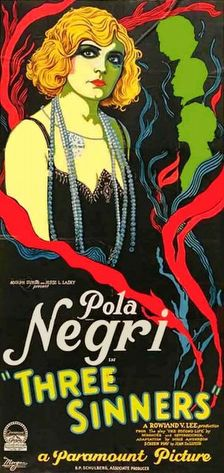
- Theatrical release three-sheet poster
- Directed by: Rowland V. Lee
- Written by: Doris Anderson (adaptation); Jean de Limur (adaptation); Julian Johnson (intertitles)
- Based on: Das Zweite Leben; 1927 play by Rudolf Bernauer and Rudolf Österreicher
- Produced by: Adolph Zukor; Jesse L. Lasky; Rowland V. Lee
- Starring: Pola Negri; Olga Baclanova
- Cinematography: Victor Milner
- Edited by: Robert Bassler
- Distributed by: Paramount Pictures
- Release date: April 14, 1928
- Running time: 8 reels
- Country: United States
- Languages: Silent; English intertitles

Three Sinners is a 1928 American silent drama film directed by Rowland V. Lee, starring Pola Negri, and co-starring Warner Baxter, Olga Baclanova, and Paul Lukas.

The film was produced by Famous Players–Lasky and distributed by Paramount Pictures, and is based on a play Das Zweite Leben (or The Second Life) by Rudolf Bernauer and Rudolf Österreicher. Director Lee also served as executive producer. A sound remake starring Ruth Chatterton was titled Once a Lady (1931).

== Cast ==
- Pola Negri as Baroness Gerda Wallentin
- Warner Baxter as James Harris
- Olga Baclanova as Baroness Hilda Brings
- Paul Lukas as Count Dietrich Wallentin
- Anders Randolph as Count Hellemuth Wallentin
- Tullio Carminati as Roul Stanislav
- Anton Vaverka as Valet to Dieetrich
- Ivy Harris as Countess Lilli
- William von Hardenburg as Prince von Scherson
- Robert Klein as Count Bogumi Sdarschinsky
- Irving Bacon
- Delmer Daves

== Preservation ==
With no holdings located in archives, Three Sinners is now considered a lost film.
