= His Highness Love =

1931 Franco-German comedy film

- Directed by: Robert Péguy; Erich Schmidt; Joe May
- Written by: Rudolph Bernauer; Henri Decoin; Adolf Lantz; René Pujol; Rudolf Österreicher
- Produced by: Joe May
- Starring: Annabella; André Alerme; Roger Tréville
- Cinematography: Curt Courant
- Music by: Walter Jurmann; Bronislau Kaper
- Production companies: May-Film; Standard-Filmverleih
- Distributed by: Pathé Consortium Cinéma
- Release date: 1 November 1931
- Running time: 91 minutes
- Country: France/Germany
- Language: French

His Highness Love (French: Son altesse l'amour) is a 1931 Franco-German comedy film directed by Robert Péguy, Erich Schmidt and Joe May. It stars Annabella, André Alerme and Roger Tréville and was made in Berlin as the French-language version of Her Majesty the Barmaid.

The film's sets were designed by the art directors Andrej Andrejew and Erich Kettelhut.

== Cast ==
- Annabella as Annette Wéber
- André Alerme as Jules Leroy
- Roger Tréville as Fred Leroy
- André Lefaur as Le baron Ducharme
- Charles Prince as Ernest
- Marie-Laure as La grand-mère
- Gretl Theimer as Monique
- André Dubosc as Emile
- Andrée Berty
- Raymond Galle
- Henri Richard
- Robert Tourneur

== Bibliography ==
- Driskell, Jonathan (2015). The French Screen Goddess: Film Stardom and the Modern Woman in 1930s France. I.B. Tauris. ISBN 978-0-85773-566-9.
