= The Office Manager =

1931 film

- Directed by: Hans Behrendt
- Written by: Rudolf Bernauer (play); Charlie Roellinghoff; Rudolf Österreicher (play)
- Produced by: Christoph Mülleneisen
- Starring: Felix Bressart; Hermann Thimig; Maria Meissner
- Cinematography: Franz Planer
- Edited by: Lothar Buhle
- Music by: Walter Kollo; Hans J. Salter
- Production company: Elite-Tonfilm-Produktion
- Distributed by: Siegel-Monopolfilm
- Release date: 19 November 1931
- Running time: 85 minutes
- Country: Germany
- Language: German

The Office Manager (German: Der Herr Bürovorsteher) is a 1931 German comedy film directed by Hans Behrendt and starring Felix Bressart, Hermann Thimig and Maria Meissner.

The film's sets were designed by the art director Jacek Rotmil.

== Cast ==
- Felix Bressart as Joachim Reißnagel
- Hermann Thimig as Dr. Fritz Barke
- Maria Meissner as Ulli von Waldhofen
- Julia Serda as Anna Barke
- Hans Wassmann as Admiral von Waldhofen
- Olga Limburg as Lucie von Waldhofen
- Peter Wolff as Kurt von Waldhofen
- Alfred Abel as Georg von Zamokki
- Albert Paulig as Baron Zergelien
- Margot Landa as Katrin Hinrichsen
- Henry Bender as Mitglied des Radfahrvereins
- Siegfried Berisch as Mitglied des Radfahrvereins
- Eugen Rex as Mitglied des Radfahrvereins
- Hedwig Wangel as Mitglied des Radfahrvereins

== Bibliography ==
- Bock, Hans-Michael; Bergfelder, Tim, eds. (2009). The Concise Cinegraph: Encyclopaedia of German Cinema. New York: Berghahn Books. ISBN 978-1-57181-655-9.
