= Tout pour l'amour =

- Directed by: Henri-Georges Clouzot; Joe May
- Screenplay by: Irma von Cube; Ernst Marischka; Rudolf Bernauer
- Produced by: Arnold Pressburger; Gregor Rabinovitch
- Starring: Jan Kiepura; Claudie Clèves; Charles Dechamps; Lucien Baroux
- Cinematography: Otto Kanturek; Bruno Timm
- Edited by: Konstantin Mick
- Music by: Bronislau Kaper; Walter Jurmann
- Production company: Cine-Allianz Tonfilm GmbH
- Release date: 15 September 1933 (Paris)
- Running time: 93 minutes
- Country: Germany
- Language: French

Tout pour l'amour is a 1933 German musical film directed by Henri-Georges Clouzot and Joe May, which stars Jan Kiepura, Claudie Clèves and Charles Dechamps. It was a French-language version of the film A Song for You. The English-language version is My Song for You (1934).

The film's sets were designed by Werner Schlichting.

== Cast ==
- Jan Kiepura as Ricardo Gatti
- Claudie Clèves as Lixie
- Charles Dechamps as Baron Kleeberg
- Lucien Baroux as Charlie
- Betty Daussmond as mother
- Pierre Magnier as father
- Charles Fallot as hotel's doorman
- Jean Martinelli as Théo
- Colette Darfeuil as sa lady in Monbijou
- Anna Lefeuvrier
