= Johann Strauss Theater =

Theatre in Vienna, Austria

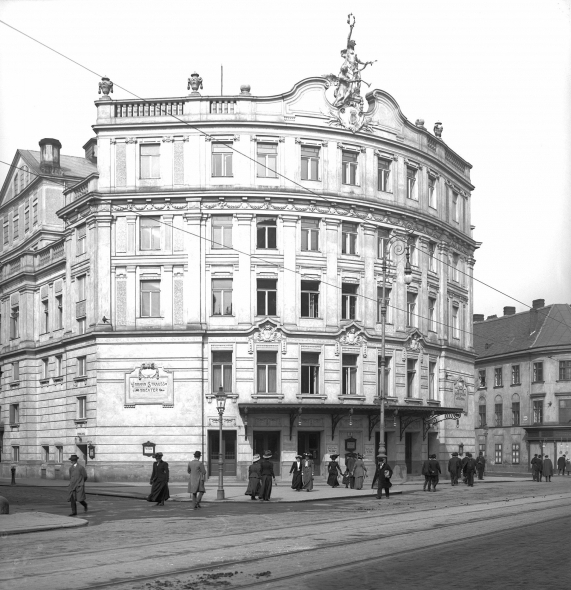
- Johann Strauss Theater c. 1910
- Interactive map of Johann Strauss Theater
- Address: Wieden; Austria
- Coordinates: 48.195395°N 16.368513°E
- Type: Theatre

Construction
- Opened: 30 October 1908
- Demolished: 1960

The Johann Strauss Theater in Wieden, part of Vienna, Austria, was built in 1908 especially for operettas. It had a hall for 1,200 spectators in Baroque Revival style. After many successful world premieres such as Die Csárdásfürstin, played more than 500 times, it was demolished in 1960.

== History ==
The Johann Strauss Theater was built at Favoritenstraße 8 in Wieden in 1908 when Viennese operetta was highly successful. The architect Eduard Prandl built a theatre dedicated to operetta for 1,200 spectators in Baroque Revival style. It was opened on 30 October 1908 with 1001 Nacht, an arrangement of Indigo und die vierzig Räuber by Johann Strauss, made after he died.

The world premiere of Emmerich Kálmán's Die Csárdásfürstin in 1915 was followed by more than 500 performances. Alexander Girardi starred in Kálmáns Der Zigeunerprimas, premiered in 1912. In 1925, Lehár's Paganini was first performed. Josephine Baker appeared in her revue Schwarz auf weiß in March 1928.

The theatre faced financial problems due to the Great Depression in 1929 and the growing attraction of sound film. Therefore the architect Carl Witzmann transformed the house into a cinema for 1,400 people in 1931. Named Scala, it was opened on 30 September 1931. It was also used for Varieté performances.

Between 1948 and 1956, when the district was under Soviet occupation, the housе was used for drama theatre in ambitious staging, such as with Karl Paryla and Therese Giehse in Brecht plays, but the Vienna press ignored them for political reasons.

After Soviet occupation, the house existed only for a short time; the last performance was held on 30 June 1956. It was demolished in 1959/60.

== World premieres ==
Several operettas were first performed at the theatre:

- Bub oder Mädel, by Bruno Granichstaedten, 13 November 1908
- Das Fürstenkind, by Franz Lehár, 7 October 1909
- Der Zigeunerprimas, by Emmerich Kálmán, 11 October 1912
- Der Nachtschnellzug, by Leo Fall, 20 December 1913
- Das dumme Herz, by Carl Michael Ziehrer, 27 February 1914
- Rund um die Liebe, by Oscar Straus, 9 November 1914
- Die Csárdásfürstin, by Kálmán, 17 November 1915
- Die Faschingsfee, by Kálmán, 21 September 1917
- Das Hollandweibchen, by Kálmán, 30 January 1920
- Eine Sommernacht, by Robert Stolz, 23 December 1921
- Bajazzos Abenteuer, by Michael Krasznay-Krausz, 1923
- Ein Märchen aus Florenz, by Ralph Benatzky, 14 September 1923
- Paganini, by Lehár, 30 October 1925
- Evelyne, by Bruno Granichstaedten, 6 January 1928
- Das Veilchen vom Montmartre, by Kálmán, 21 March 1930
- Der süßeste Schwindel der Welt, by Stolz, 21 December 1937
