= Once a Lady =

1931 film

- Theatrical release poster
- Directed by: Guthrie McClintic
- Written by: Zoë Akins; Samuel Hoffenstein
- Based on: Das Zweite Leben; 1927 play by Rudolf Bernauer and Rudolf Österreicher
- Produced by: Adolph Zukor
- Starring: Ruth Chatterton; Ivor Novello; Jill Esmond
- Cinematography: Charles Lang
- Production company: Paramount Pictures
- Distributed by: Paramount Pictures
- Release date: November 7, 1931
- Running time: 80 minutes
- Country: United States
- Language: English

Once a Lady is a 1931 American pre-Code drama film directed by Guthrie McClintic and starring Ruth Chatterton, Ivor Novello and Jill Esmond. The film, produced and distributed by Paramount Pictures, is a remake of the 1928 Pola Negri silent film Three Sinners. The film was the final attempt by British matinée idol Novello to establish himself in Hollywood.

== Plot ==
Anna, a young Russian woman living in France, marries Jimmy, a young Englishman who has gotten her pregnant. Though Jimmy is in love with Anna, he wants her to conform to his family's staid mores. Anna becomes a loving mother to their daughter, Faith. Jimmy and his family are embarrassed by Anna's free spirit, and when he stands for Parliament he sends her to France to get her out of the way. On the train from Calais to Nice, where she is supposed to join her in-laws and 6-year-old Faith, Anna meets a former suitor who persuades her to get off the train in Paris. The train crashes between Paris and Nice, and all passengers in the car Anna had been on are believed dead. Jimmy flies to the south of France to confirm her death. Meanwhile, Anna spends the night in Paris with her lover but decides that she belongs with her daughter. Unaware of the train crash, Anna arrives in Nice to find Jimmy there with his family, and the truth comes out about her infidelity. Jimmy declares that he will divorce her, and as the guilty party Anna will lose the right to be with her daughter. To avoid a scandal they agree that instead of divorce, Anna will remain "dead" as a presumed victim of the train crash.

Twelve years later, Anna is a wealthy courtesan living in Paris. She reads the society pages in English newspapers to follow Faith's life in England. Faith wants to marry Allan, a young man who is studying architecture in Paris. Jimmy and his second wife refuse consent to the engagement. Exasperated by their coldness, Faith impulsively leaves home and goes to Paris to be with Allan. Allan disappoints Faith by explaining that he can't afford to marry and isn't yet qualified for a job. At a party, Anna observes Faith drinking heavily and acting rashly. Without revealing her true identity as Faith's mother, Anna takes Faith in hand. Faith comes to her senses and Anna engineers a marriage settlement for her and Allan.

== Cast ==
- Ruth Chatterton as Anna Keremazoff
- Ivor Novello as Bennett Cloud
- Jill Esmond as Faith Fenwick the Girl
- Geoffrey Kerr as Jimmy Fenwick
- Doris Lloyd as Lady Ellen Somerville
- Herbert Bunston as Roger Fenwick
- Gwendolyn Logan as Mrs. Fenwick
- Stella Moore as Alice Fenwick
- Edith Kingdon as Caroline Gryce
- Bramwell Fletcher as Allen Corinth
- Theodore von Eltz as Harry Cosden
- Ethel Griffies as Miss Bleeker
- Claude King as Sir William Gresham
- Lillian Rich as Jane Vernon
- Leonard Carey as Butler
- Adrienne D'Ambricourt as Propriétaire
