= That's All That Matters (film) =

1931 film directed by Joe May

- German film poster
- German: ...und das ist die Hauptsache!?
- Directed by: Joe May
- Written by: Richard Duschinsky; Adolf Lantz
- Produced by: Joe May
- Starring: Nora Gregor; Harry Liedtke; Ursula Grabley
- Cinematography: Otto Kanturek
- Music by: Walter Jurmann; Willy Schmidt-Gentner
- Production companies: Deutsche Lichtspiel-Syndikat; May-Film
- Distributed by: Deutsche Lichtspiel-Syndikat
- Release date: 23 March 1931
- Running time: 88 minutes
- Country: Germany
- Language: German

That's All That Matters (German: ...und das ist die Hauptsache!?) is a 1931 German musical comedy film directed by Joe May and starring Nora Gregor, Harry Liedtke and Ursula Grabley. It was shot at the Babelsberg Studios in Potsdam. The film's sets were designed by the art director Otto Hunte. It premiered at the Gloria-Palast in Berlin.

== Cast ==
- Nora Gregor as Renée Roettlinck
- Harry Liedtke as Werner Roettlinck
- Ursula Grabley as Pixi
- Robert Thoeren as The Prince
- Agnes Bernauer as Peterle, son
- Ferdinand Hart as Bittrich
- Otto Wallburg as Klöppel, painter
- Fritz Odemar as Detective Commissioner Schierling
- Jakob Tiedtke as Wilhelm, servant to the Roettlincks
- Julius Falkenstein as Ball visitor
- Ernst Duschy as ragman
- Julius E. Herrmann
- Trude Lehmann
- Rolf Müller
- Ernst Pröckl
- Toni Tetzlaff
- Viktor Schwannecke
