= Veronika, der Lenz ist da =

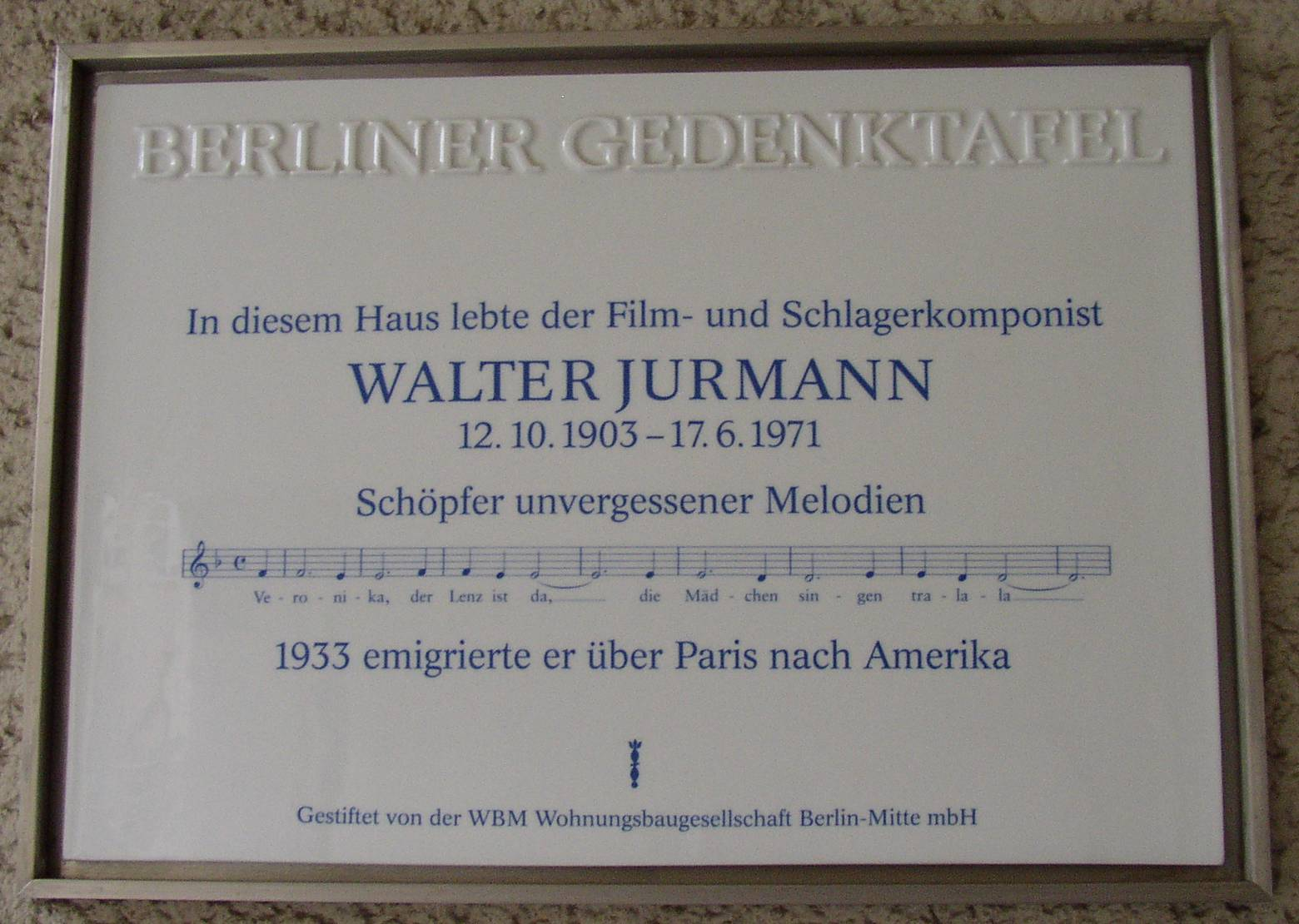
- Sheet music on Berlin memorial plaque

Song
- Released: 1920s
- Genre: Traditional pop
- Songwriter: Walter Jurmann

"Veronika, der Lenz ist da" ("Veronika, spring is here") is a popular 1920s song by Walter Jurmann. Covered countless times, probably the best-known version is by the German sextet the Comedian Harmonists in 1930.

== Lyrics ==
The refrain goes:

Veronika, der Lenz ist da,
die Mädchen singen tralala.
Die ganze Welt ist wie verhext,
Veronika, der Spargel wächst!
Veronika, die Welt ist grün,
drum laßt uns in die Wälder ziehn.
Sogar der Großpapa sagt zu der Großmama:
"Veronika, der Lenz ist da,
Veronika, Veronika, der Lenz ist da!"

Veronika, Spring is here,
The girls sing tralala.
The whole world is as bewitched,
Veronika, the asparagus grows!
Veronika, the world is green,
Let us go into the woods.
Even the Grandpa says to Grandma:
"Veronika, Spring is here,
Veronika, Veronika, Spring is here!"

== Interpretation ==
The growing asparagus can be read as a sexual metaphor.

== See also ==
- Barbara's Rhubarb Bar
