= Zsuzsi kisasszony =

Operetta by Emmerich Kálmán

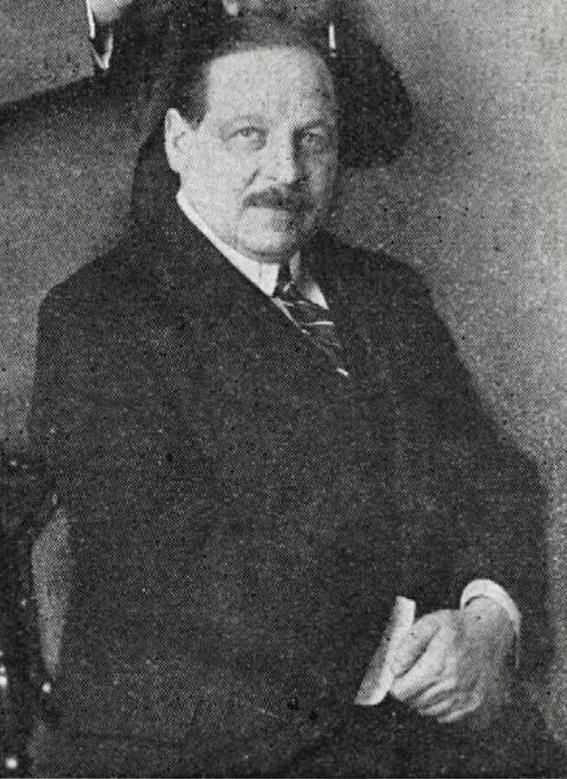
Emmerich Kálmán

Zsuzsi kisasszony (literally "Miss Suzy", also known as Miss Springtime and Die Faschingsfee) is an operetta in three acts by Hungarian composer Emmerich Kálmán. It premiered at the Vig theatre in Budapest on February 23, 1915. The Hungarian language libretto was by Martos and M. Bródy. As Miss Springtime, it opened, in heavily revised form, on Broadway in 1916.

With a German libretto by Alfred Maria Willner and Rudolf Österreicher, a revised version of the music premiered as Die Faschingsfee (The Carnival Fairy) in Vienna, at the Johann Strauss Theater, on 21 September 1917. A further revision of Die Faschingsfee was done for Berlin, with a larger role for the leading lady, and it is the Berlin version that is most often seen today. In 2012, an English translation of the Berlin version was done at the Ohio Light Opera under the title Miss Springtime, but the recording made of that production was eventually released in 2013 under the title The Carnival Fairy.

== Roles in Zsuzsi Kisasszony ==
Role	Voice type	Premiere Cast, February 27, 1915 (Conductor: -)
Zsuzsi	soprano	Mizzi Günther
Falsetti	tenor	Emil Guttmann
Péterfy	tenor	Karl Bachmann
Dinye	tenor	Oscar Sabo
Lauffen	tenor	
Szerafina	soprano	Mizzi Delorm

== Roles in Die Faschingsfee ==
Role	Voice type	Premiere Cast, September 21, 1917 (Conductor: -)
Alexandra Maria	soprano	Mizzi Günther
Hubert von Mützelburg	tenor	Oscar Sabo
Lori Aschenbrenner	soprano	Mizzi Delorm
Ottokar von Grevlingen	baritone	
Viktor Ronai	tenor	Karl Bachmann

== Synopsis ==
The plot of Zsuzsi Kisasszony concerns Zsuzsi, a small-town girl who runs off to Budapest with Falsetti, a famous tenor, only to return, somewhat the wiser, to her old home and Péterfy, her old sweetheart.

The plot of Die Faschingsfee revolves around an artist, Victor, who in defending the honor of an unknown woman (Princess Alexandra Maria, as it turns out) offends his patron and loses a large stipend. In the end, all comes out right.

== Film ==
- Die Faschingsfee, directed by Hans Steinhoff (Germany, 1931)

== Sources ==
- Lamb, Andrew (2001). "Kalman". In Sadie, Stanley; Tyrrell, John (eds.). The New Grove Dictionary of Music and Musicians (2nd ed.). London: Macmillan. ISBN 978-1-56159-239-5.
- A survey of Kalman operettas
