= Escapade =

Escapade or Escapades may refer to:

== Transportation ==
- Beneteau Escapade, a French sailboat design
- HMS Escapade, a 1934 Royal Navy destroyer that served in World War II
- Just Escapade, an American two-seat kit-built light aircraft

== Films ==
- Escapade (1932 film), an American crime film directed by Richard Thorpe
- Escapade (1935 film), starring William Powell and Luise Rainer
- Escapade (1936 film), a German romantic comedy film
- Escapade (1951 film), or Atoll K, a Laurel and Hardy film
- Escapade (1955 film), featuring John Mills
- Escapade (1957 film), with Louis Jourdan

== Music ==
=== Classical ===
- Escapades for two violins, Dick Kattenburg
- Escapades, David Dubery
- Escapades, concerto for alto saxophone & orchestra John Williams

=== Bands ===
- Escapade (band), an American rock band
- The Escapades, an American garage rock band

=== Albums ===
- Escapades (Gaspard Augé album), 2021
- Escapades (Hungry Kids of Hungary album)
- Escapade (James Spaulding album), 1999
- Escapade (Tim Finn album), 1983
- Escapades, album by Christine Atallah 2006
- Escapades, album by Dreadzone
- Escapades, album by Gem 2006
- Escapades, album by Harold Danko 2009

=== Songs ===
- "Escapade" (song), by Janet Jackson
- "Escapades" (song), by Azealia Banks

== Literature ==
- Escapade (play), a 1952 play by Roger MacDougall
- Escapade (Marvel Comics), a mutant character in comics published by Marvel Comics

== Television ==
- Escapade, a proposed TV series piloted in 1978; see The New Avengers (TV series)
- Escapade, an early 1980s cable television network featuring adult content that became The Playboy Channel

== Spacecraft ==
- ESCAPADE — a pair of Mars orbiters launched on 13 November 2025 to study interactions between its atmosphere and the solar wind
