= Bronisław Kaper =

Polish film and musical theatre composer (1902–1983)

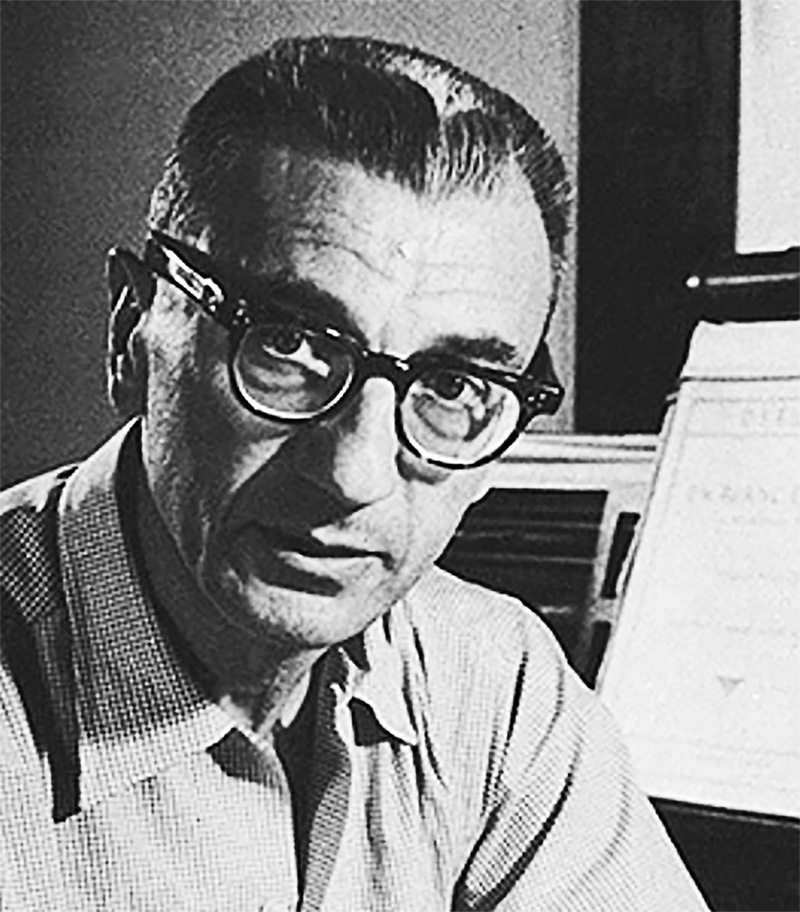

Background information
- Born: Bronisław Kaper; February 5, 1902
- Origin: Warsaw, Congress Poland, Russian Empire
- Died: April 26, 1983 (aged 81) Beverly Hills, California, U.S.
- Occupations: Composer; arranger; violinist; conductor; pianist; bandleader

Bronisław Kaper (Polish pronunciation: [brɔˈɲiswaf ˈkapɛr]; February 5, 1902 – April 26, 1983) was a Polish film composer who scored films and musical theater in Germany, France, and the United States. The American immigration authorities misspelled his name as Bronislau Kaper. He was also variously credited as Bronislaw Kaper, Bronislaw Kapper, Benjamin Kapper, and Edward Kane.

Kaper is perhaps best remembered as the composer of the jazz standards "On Green Dolphin Street" (lyrics by Ned Washington) and "Invitation" (lyrics by Paul Francis Webster) which were the respective title songs for the Metro-Goldwyn-Mayer films Green Dolphin Street (1947) and Invitation (1952). He also scored the MGM film musical Lili (1953) for which he received the Academy Award for Best Original Score. Kaper's later works include Mutiny on the Bounty (1962), Lord Jim (1965) and the TV series The F.B.I. (1965–1974).

== Biography ==
Bronisław Kaper was born in Warsaw, Poland, then in the Russian Empire into a wealthy Ashkenazi Jewish family. He began playing the piano at the age of six and quickly demonstrated considerable musical talent, being known as a "wunderkind". In 1919, he passed his secondary school leaving examination at Stanisław Staszic High School in Warsaw.

At his father’s urging, he studied law at Warsaw University, largely because higher education and a conventional profession were expected in his bourgeois Polish-Jewish family. Kaper later recalled that the usual career choices were law, medicine, or engineering, but his own ambitions were musical: he hoped to become a serious composer and, for a time, considered becoming a concert pianist. At the same time that he studied law, he studied piano and composition at the Warsaw Conservatory. He recalled that he was an exceptionally strong student, becoming the number-one student in his school, and that he graduated from law at approximately twenty-two and a half. In 1920, Bronislaw Kaper was drafted into the Polish Army, due to the Polish-Soviet War, and fought in the Battle of Warsaw, earning the Cross of Valour.

His education was demanding, as he completed his legal studies alongside his conservatory training and even had to perform a Chopin concerto only two weeks after graduating in law. Although he had initially pursued classical composition, Kaper soon began earning money through teaching subjects such as Mathematics and Latin. He also entered Warsaw’s cabaret scene, writing songs with a friend for local cabarets, such as Morskie Oko and collecting royalties in person each night. Alongside his popular work, he continued composing serious music, including piano pieces and art songs. Seeking further musical development, he eventually moved to Berlin, where he studied theory and composition and began establishing himself as a successful songwriter and composer.

In Berlin, Kaper spent approximately six years developing his career as a composer and songwriter. Although he had gone there primarily to continue his musical education, he later recalled that he learned a great deal about theory and composition, while finding the standard of piano playing in Poland considerably higher.

Berlin nevertheless became the place where he entered the film industry and established himself as a highly successful songwriter. He formed a close professional partnership with the lyricist Fritz Rotter, with whom he sometimes produced as many as two songs a day, taking them directly to publishers and receiving advances. Their success allowed Kaper to enjoy a comfortable lifestyle, including a convertible Cadillac and his own apartment.

During this period he became acquainted with prominent European performers, including the singer Richard Tauber, for whom he wrote numerous songs for films, and later Jan Kiepura, with whom he worked on his final film in Berlin. Kaper also married a Russian woman during these years. As the political situation in Germany deteriorated under Hitler, Kaper and his associates became increasingly concerned about their safety. After completing the final recording for the Kiepura film, he and his wife left Berlin for Paris, bringing his European career to an end just as the political climate became increasingly dangerous.

In 1935, MGM head Louis B. Mayer was vacationing in Paris and walked into a nightclub. Kaper was sitting at the piano, playing his own popular European tunes to a packed room. Mayer walked straight up to the piano mid-set, demanded to know who wrote the song, and offered Kaper a contract on the spot, and so in 1935, upon being offered a seven-year contract, Kaper and Jurmann emigrated to the United States, where they continued their work. One of their first American films was the Marx Brothers comedy A Night at the Opera (1935), for which they composed the song "Cosi-Cosa". Kaper and Jurmann also co-wrote the theme song for the 1936 film San Francisco. They worked again with the Marx Brothers on their follow-up film, A Day at the Races (1937), for which Kaper, Jurmann, and Gus Kahn wrote the song "All God's Chillun Got Rhythm", which became a minor jazz standard.

Kaper later recalled that his early work at MGM was initially regarded primarily as that of a songwriter rather than a film composer. After composing incidental music for Escapade (1935), he was told by the studio's music department that he was a songwriter and that a separate composer should write the score. Kaper later described this as an example of the tendency of the American studio system to assign composers to narrowly defined roles. He eventually demonstrated that he could work successfully in both areas, writing songs as well as complete film scores.

Kaper recalled that Escapade, starring William Powell and Luise Rainer, was particularly memorable because European composers had often been expected to perform several functions themselves, including writing songs, composing the score, and conducting. In Hollywood, however, these responsibilities were increasingly divided among specialists. Kaper disliked conducting and preferred to have another conductor work with the orchestra while he monitored the music alongside the dialogue and picture. He believed that this allowed him to judge how the music would ultimately function during the dubbing process and reduced the risk of the music sounding different from how he had intended it once combined with the finished film. A song he wrote for Escapade, "You're All I Need", reached the number-one position on the Lucky Strike Hit Parade. Kaper later recalled that, because his English was still limited, he initially did not understand the significance of the announcement and did not realize what connection the cigarette brand had with the program.

Kaper was part of a significant community of refugees in Los Angeles during the 1940s who had fled Nazi-occupied/war-torn Europe for the United States. This community included composers, writers, and filmmakers such as Thomas and Heinrich Mann, Bertolt Brecht, Arnold Schoenberg, Lion Feuchtwanger, Max Reinhardt, Hanns Eisler, and Berthold and Salka Viertel.

His sole musical theater venture in New York was 1946's Polonaise, for which he both adapted music by Chopin, and composed many numbers himself.

In 1947, Kaper scored the Metro-Goldwyn-Mayer film Green Dolphin Street, whose title song "On Green Dolphin Street" (lyrics by Ned Washington) is perhaps Kaper's most enduring and popular composition. It has since become a jazz standard, recorded by artists including Miles Davis, Sarah Vaughan, John Coltrane, Tony Bennett, and Eric Dolphy. Kaper later recalled learning that Miles Davis had recorded "On Green Dolphin Street" through composer and pianist André Previn, who told him that the recording would likely lead to numerous further interpretations of the song. Kaper expressed surprise at the transition of the composition from a film song into a work widely performed by jazz musicians.

Kaper composed perhaps his second most-enduring song "Invitation (song)" (lyrics by Paul Francis Webster) for director George Cukor's melodrama A Life of Her Own; but it was not until its use as the theme song for the 1952 film Invitation that the song became popular. "Invitation" has been widely recorded, by artists including Quincy Jones, Rosemary Clooney, Dinah Washington, and Jaco Pastorius as the title track of his 1983 album Invitation (Jaco Pastorius album). The composition originated when Cukor and MGM's music department were considering what music should be played during a bar scene in A Life of Her Own. Rather than using a Chopin waltz, Kaper offered to compose an original piece for the scene. He completed the music within approximately a week, and it was performed on piano in the film by Jakob Gimpel. The composition was subsequently reused in the 1952 film Invitation, which gave the piece its title. Kaper later said that he believed the work contributed to a trend toward more sophisticated harmonies in instrumental popular music. Kaper particularly objected to being judged by people whom he felt lacked musical or filmmaking experience, and he regarded the constant evaluation of composers during the creative process as one of the major disadvantages of the studio system. He contrasted this with the greater freedom enjoyed by independent songwriters, who could work at their own pace, travel, take breaks, and choose their own collaborators without being continuously supervised by a studio. Kaper ultimately regarded artistic independence as increasingly important later in his life and said that he no longer wanted his work to be subject to continual evaluation by studio executives.

In 1954, Kaper won an Oscar for scoring of the musical Lili (1953) starring Leslie Caron, and featuring Kaper's song "Hi-Lili, Hi-Lo" with lyrics by Helen Deutsch. Kaper also scored Caron's next film, The Glass Slipper, a musical adaptation of the fairy tale Cinderella.

Kaper's approach to film composition was strongly influenced by both his European musical training and his familiarity with American popular music. While still in Europe, he had admired composers such as George Gershwin, Jerome Kern, Vincent Youmans, and Arthur Schwartz and deliberately incorporated elements of American popular musical style into his own work. He later recalled that European musicians had sometimes described his music as "too American", a characterization he regarded humorously after moving to Hollywood. For "San Francisco", he deliberately wrote in a strongly American popular style, believing that the song's directness and rhythmic character suited the period of the film. Kaper refused to sit at a desk and write orchestral scores. He composed exclusively sitting at his piano, pounding out melodies and harmonies by hand. Because he never formally trained in modern, massive Hollywood orchestration, he completely relied on hiring specialized studio ghost-orchestrators to translate his piano playing into sheet music for the studio orchestras. Kaper physically could not stand conducting. While other composers loved standing on the podium waving the baton, Kaper found it stressful and counterproductive. He explicitly demanded that someone else conduct his music so he could physically sit in the dubbing booth next to the sound engineers, watching the film screen, manually checking how his notes hit the actors' dialogue in real-time.

In 1959, Kaper composed most of the music for MGM's production of Green Mansions with Audrey Hepburn and Anthony Perkins, after MGM had asked Brazilian composer Heitor Villa-Lobos to write the score. Only some of Villa-Lobos' music was used in the film; much of the rest was later arranged as the secular cantata Forest of the Amazons, which Villa-Lobos recorded in stereophonic sound for United Artists Records with the Symphony of the Air. Kaper later explained that Villa-Lobos had originally been expected to contribute music to the film but was unwilling to undertake the practical work of scoring the picture. MGM consequently asked Kaper to compose the score while incorporating as much of Villa-Lobos' music as possible. Kaper recalled that he and Villa-Lobos had a difficult professional relationship because of the latter's reluctance to see his music adapted for the film.

One of Kaper's last projects under his MGM contract was also his most ambitious: the big-budget 1962 remake of Mutiny on the Bounty starring Marlon Brando, for which he wrote epic seafaring melodies as well as native Polynesian music (Nominated for Academy Award for Best Musical Score). MGM had originally wanted composer Miklós Rózsa (who was known for lush epics) to score this remake, but Rózsa declined. The film's love theme "Love Song from Mutiny on the Bounty (Follow Me)" has found a place in the repertoire of popular Polynesian music and is occasionally performed for tourists at Luaus. Kaper's interest in melding exotic indigenous music with traditional styles continued in Lord Jim, where he introduced Western audiences to the unique sound of the southeast-Asian gamelan orchestra. For Lord Jim, Kaper undertook extensive research into Southeast Asian music. He traveled to Cambodia to hear local music and investigate suitable instruments, but found the practical difficulties of working directly with Cambodian musical groups considerable. After returning to the United States, he contacted Monty Hood, head of Ethnic Music at UCLA, and studied Indonesian gamelan instruments and performance techniques. He worked with musicians at UCLA and learned how to write for the instruments before incorporating elements of Balinese and Javanese music into the film's score. He later recalled that this experience required him to learn an unfamiliar system of orchestration and that he regarded the process as an important musical education. For television, Kaper composed the theme music and several scores for the Quinn Martin-produced series The F.B.I. In total, Kaper composed music for nearly 150 Hollywood films.

== Other Info ==
In Beverly Hills, his wife was known as a highly elegant but quiet presence who managed their home. Her death "several years before his own" deeply affected Kaper. Because they never had children, he spent his final years in a massive, quiet house, becoming fiercely independent but increasingly isolated, survived in the end only by a single niece. Kaper passed away on April 26, 1983, at his home in Beverly Hills after a brutal, private battle with cancer. Kaper left explicit instructions with MGM and his estate that there was to be no funeral service held for him.

Bronislau Kaper was an effervescent, animated composer who was known for his infectious joy, a "life of the party" personality, and his distinct, accented mannerisms. Originally a classical purist, he embraced the jazz interpretations of his film themes, while managing his musical output in Beverly Hills with two pianos: a grand Blüthner for classical work and a "rinky-tanky" Starck for popular melodies. Following his wife's passing, his estate and legacy were managed by his niece, Bobbie Hill Fromberg.

Kaper once remarked on his time at MGM: "If you went to work for MGM, nothing was impossible in your life. Not just your working life, either. Anything you wanted. But Toots, they owned you. You were a commodity."

The studio forced an exclusivity clause. MGM could legally lay Kaper off for three months out of the year without pay. During those three unpaid months, his contract legally banned him from taking any outside musical work, theater gigs, or writing projects. He was entirely at their mercy.

In a 1975 interview, he was asked if he ever felt limited by the formulas of film scoring. He famously responded: "If I were bothered by the clichés of the past, I couldn't live. Not just music. Life is also full of clichés. Don't fall for them."

== Credits on Broadway ==
- Polonaise (1945) – musical – composer
- Mostly Sondheim (2002) – concert – featured songwriter

== Recordings - film scores ==
Recordings of many of Kaper's film scores were not available in his lifetime but, in recent decades, many of these previously unavailable recordings have been re-released and/or re-recorded on compact disc for labels like Monstrous Movie Music (Them!), and Film Score Monthly (Lili, Home from the Hill, The Swan and others).

== Legacy ==
=== The Bronisław Kaper Awards ===
The Bronisław Kaper Awards For Young Artists are held annually by the Los Angeles Philharmonic for the piano and strings instrumental categories, which alternate each year. Named in honor of Bronisław Kaper, who served for more than 15 years as a member of the Los Angeles Philharmonic Association's Board of Directors, the Awards encourage the development of young and gifted musicians. Award winners receive monetary awards: first place receiving $2,500, second place receiving $2,000 and Most Promising Musician winning $500.

The 2007 Bronisław Kaper Awards competition has been for string players.

== Selected filmography ==
- The Corvette Captain (1930)
- The Big Attraction (1931)
- A Mad Idea (1932)
- His Highness Love (1931)
- Marriage with Limited Liability (1931)
- Scandal on Park Street (1932)
- Three on a Honeymoon (1932)
- Things Are Getting Better Already (1932)
- Honeymoon Trip (1933)
- Adventures on the Lido (1933)
- Madame Wants No Children (1933)
- A Song for You (1933)
- Today Is the Day (1933)
- All for Love (1933)
- A Man Has Been Stolen (1934)
- Moscow Nights (1934)
- A Day at the Races (1937)
- The Captain Is a Lady (1940)
- Above Suspicion (1943)
- Gaslight (1944)
- Mrs. Parkington (1944)
- The Stranger (1946)
- The Great Sinner (1949)
- A Life of Her Own (1950)
- To Please a Lady (1950)
- The Red Badge of Courage (1951)
- The Naked Spur (1953)
- Lili (1953)
- Them! (1954)
- The Prodigal (1955)
- The Glass Slipper (1955)
- The Adventures of Quentin Durward (1955)
- The Swan (1956)
- Somebody Up There Likes Me (1956)
- The Barretts of Wimpole Street (1957)
- Jet Pilot (1957)
- Don't Go Near the Water (1957)
- The Brothers Karamazov (1958)
- Auntie Mame (1958)
- Green Mansions (1959)
- The Scapegoat (1959)
- Home from the Hill (1960)
- BUtterfield 8 (1960)
- Ada (1961)
- Mutiny on the Bounty (1962)
- Kisses for My President (1964)
- Lord Jim (1965)
- Tobruk (1967)
- The Way West (1967)
- Counterpoint (1968)
- A Flea in Her Ear (1968)

== See also ==
- Cinema of Poland
- List of Polish Academy Award winners and nominees
- List of Poles

== Sources ==
- Viertel, Salka, The Kindness of Strangers (New York: Rinehart,1969), pp. 250–251
- Elisabeth Buxbaum: Veronika, der Lenz ist da. Walter Jurmann – Ein Musiker zwischen den Welten und Zeiten. Mit einem Werkverzeichnis von Alexander Sieghardt. Edition Steinbauer, Wien 2006, ISBN 3-902494-18-2
