= Jacobsohn =

Jacobsohn is a surname. Notable people with the surname include:

- Boris Jacobsohn (1918–1966), American physicist
- Dora Jacobsohn (1908–1983), German-Swedish physiologist and endocrinologist
- Friedrich Jacobsohn (1894–?), German urologist and writer
- Helen Jacobsohn (born 1945), Australian sprint canoeist
- Margaret Jacobsohn, Namibian environmentalist
- Siegfried Jacobsohn (1881–1926), German journalist, editor and theatre critic
- Simon E. Jacobsohn (1839–1902), Latvian-American violinist

== See also ==
- Bekhterev–Jacobsohn reflex, Medical sign
