= Adolf Lantz =

Austrian screenwriter

Adolf Lantz (30 November 1882 – 19 August 1949) was an Austrian screenwriter. Lantz went into exile following the Nazi takeover of power in Germany, and died in London.

== Selected filmography ==
- Ilona (1921)
- The Inheritance of Tordis (1921)
- Tabitha, Stand Up (1922)
- One Glass of Water (1923)
- The Countess of Paris (1923)
- Dangerous Clues (1924)
- Spring Awakening (1924)
- Man Against Man (1924)
- Dancing Mad (1925)
- The Morals of the Alley (1925)
- The Elegant Bunch (1925)
- Rags and Silk (1925)
- The Director General (1925)
- The Telephone Operator (1925)
- The Golden Butterfly (1926)
- State Attorney Jordan (1926)
- The Queen of the Baths (1926)
- The Divorcée (1926)
- Unmarried Daughters (1926)
- Sword and Shield (1926)
- Madame Wants No Children (1926)
- The Prince's Child (1927)
- The Ghost Train (1927)
- Number 17 (1928)
- The Devious Path (1928)
- Song (1928)
- Tragedy of Youth (1929)
- The Flame of Love (1930)
- Elisabeth of Austria (1931)
- Her Majesty the Barmaid (1931)
- His Highness Love (1931)
- That's All That Matters (1931)
- A Night in Paradise (1932)
- Rasputin, Demon with Women (1932)
- Kochaj tylko mnie (1935)
- Crossroads (1938)

== Bibliography ==
- Prawer, S.S. Between Two Worlds: The Jewish Presence in German and Austrian Film, 1910-1933. Berghahn Books, 2007.
