= Pola Negri =

Polish actress and singer (1897–1987)

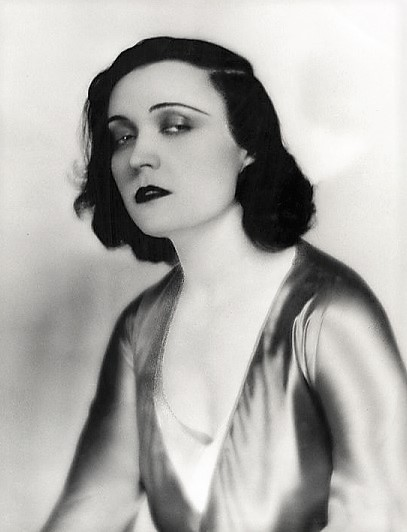
- Negri in 1931
- Born: Barbara Apolonia Chałupiec; 3 January 1897; Lipno, Kingdom of Poland, Russian Empire
- Died: 1 August 1987 (aged 90); San Antonio, Texas, U.S.
- Resting place: Calvary Cemetery (Los Angeles), California, U.S. 34°01′42″N 118°10′36″W
- Occupations: Actress; singer
- Years active: 1914–1943, 1964
- Spouses: Count Eugeniusz Dąbski (m. 1919; div. 1922) Prince Serge Mdivani (m. 1927; div. 1931)

Pola Negri (/ˈpoʊlə ˈnɛɡri/; born Barbara Apolonia Chałupiec (Note: The spelling is from multiple Polish language sources. The spelling of Pola Negri's surname at birth is complicated not only by the difference between the English and Polish alphabets, but also by the fact that she was born in the Russian-ruled part of Poland, at a time when the use of Polish was suppressed and all government records, including her birth certificate, were kept in Russian using the Cyrillic alphabet, which is even less suitable for transcribing Polish sounds than the Latin alphabet. Negri's birth name was often Anglicized to Chalupec.) [apɔˈlɔɲa xaˈwupʲɛt͡s]; (Note: In Polish, "ł" and "l" are distinct letters. The former is pronounced as the English "w", the latter as the English "l." Also, the "c" is pronounced as the English "ts.") 3 January 1897 (Note: Some sources cite 31 December 1896 as Negri's date of birth but the four-day discrepancy is due to the change in styling from the Julian calendar (OS) of Imperial Russia to the Gregorian calendar (NS) in Poland, per biographer Mariusz Kotowski, who uses the 3 January 1897 date in his biography of her life. Negri herself used both dates on different documents, including United States immigration and naturalization paperwork, but liked to use the 31 December date and to state that she was born on the last day of the 19th century, which is why some documents, including Social Security, cite 31 December 1899, as does her crypt, indicating that Negri had made herself nearly three years younger.) – 1 August 1987) was a Polish-born stage and film actress and singer. She achieved worldwide fame during the silent and golden eras of Hollywood and European film for her tragedienne and femme fatale roles. She was also acknowledged as a sex symbol of her time.

Raised in the Congress Kingdom of Poland, Negri's childhood was marked by several personal hardships: After her father was sent to Siberia, she was raised by her single mother in poverty, and suffered tuberculosis as a teenager. Negri recovered, and went on to study ballet and acting in Warsaw, Poland, becoming a well-known stage and film actress there. In 1917, she relocated to Germany, where she began appearing in silent films for the Berlin-based UFA studio. Her film performances for UFA came to the attention of Hollywood executives at Paramount Pictures, who offered her a film contract.

Negri signed with Paramount in 1922, making her the first European actress to be contracted in Hollywood. She spent much of the 1920s working in the United States appearing in numerous films for Paramount, establishing herself as one of the most popular actresses in the American silent film era. In the 1930s, during the emergence of sound film, Negri returned to Europe, where she appeared in multiple films for Pathé Films and UFA, and also began a career as a recording artist. She made only two films after 1940, her last screen credit being in Walt Disney's The Moon-Spinners (1964).

Negri spent her later life largely outside the public sphere. She became a naturalized U.S. citizen in 1951, and spent the remainder of her life living in San Antonio, Texas. In 1987, aged 90, she died of pneumonia secondary to a brain tumor for which she refused treatment.

== Early life ==
Negri was born Barbara Apolonia Chałupiec on 3 January 1897 in Lipno, Congress Poland, Russian Empire (present-day Lipno, Poland), the only surviving child (of three) of a Polish mother, Eleonora Kiełczewska (died 24 August 1954). According to Negri, her mother came from impoverished Polish nobility, with her family having lost their fortune over support of Napoléon Bonaparte. After her father was arrested by the Russian authorities for revolutionary activities and sent to Siberia, she and her mother moved to Warsaw, where they lived in poverty, with her mother supporting them by working as a cook.

Chałupiec was raised Catholic by her mother, who was a lifelong practicing Catholic. In her youth, Chałupiec was accepted into Warsaw's Imperial Ballet Academy. Her first dance performance was in the danse des petits cygnes in Tchaikovsky's Swan Lake; she worked her way up to a solo role in the Saint-Léon ballet Coppélia. However, a bout with tuberculosis forced her to stop dancing; she was sent to a sanatorium in Zakopane to recover. During her three-month convalescence, she adopted the pseudonym Pola Negri, after the Italian novelist and poet Ada Negri; "Pola" was short for her own name, Apolonia (sometimes spelled Apollonia).

== Career ==
=== Polish theatre and film ===
Pola Negri is very temperamental, but she has her temper under tight control. She, like other high-strung actresses as Norma Talmadge and Anna Q. Nilsson, resorts to tears if anything goes wrong. These three women I rate as the best on the screen today. It is a joy to direct them: they are so sensitive to impressions. But if any of them is asked to portray a character in a way that she thinks is alien to the part, she will not be able to go on".—Director Herbert Brenon (1880-1958) in Motion Picture Magazine, February 1926.

After Negri returned from the sanatorium, she successfully auditioned at the Warsaw Imperial Academy of Dramatic Arts. Alongside her formal schooling at the academy, she took private classes outside with renowned Polish stage actress and professor Honorata Leszczyńska. She made her theatrical debut before her graduation at The Small Theatre in Warsaw on 2 October 1912. She made her stage debut in 1913 in Gerhardt Hauptmann's Hannele in Warsaw, and continued to perform there while finishing her studies at the academy, graduating in 1914. Her graduating performance was as Hedwig in Ibsen's The Wild Duck, which resulted in offers to join a number of the prominent theatres in Warsaw. By the end of World War I, Negri had established herself as a popular stage actress. She made an appearance at the Grand Theatre in Sumurun, as well as in the Small Theatre (Aleksander Fredro's Śluby panieńskie), and at the Summer Theatre in the Saxon Garden.

She debuted in film in 1914 in Slave of the Senses (Niewolnica zmysłów). She appeared in a variety of films made by the Warsaw film industry, including Bestia (Beast, released in the US as The Polish Dancer), Room No. 13 (Pokój nr 13), His Last Gesture (Jego ostatni czyn), Students (Studenci), and The Wife (Żona).

=== Ernst Lubitsch and German silent film career ===
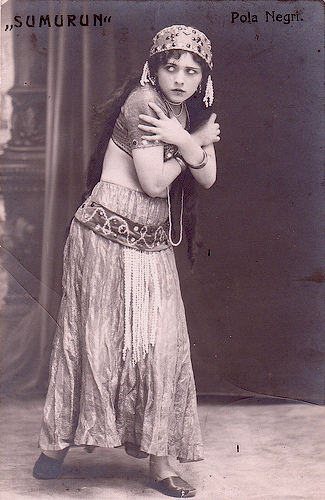
Negri in Sumurun (1920)

Negri's popularity in Poland provided her with an opportunity to move to Berlin, Germany in 1917, to appear as the dancing girl in a German revival of Max Reinhardt's theatre production of Sumurun. In this production, she met Ernst Lubitsch, who at the time was producing comedies for the German film studio UFA. Negri was first signed with Saturn Films, making six films with them, including Wenn das Herz in Haß erglüht (If the Heart Burns With Hate, 1917). After this, she signed to UFA's roster; some of the films that she made with UFA include Mania (1918), Der Gelbe Schein (The Yellow Ticket, also 1918), and Komtesse Doddy (1919).

In 1918, Lubitsch convinced UFA to let him create a large-scale film with Negri as the main character. The result was Die Augen der Mumie Ma (The Eyes of the Mummy Ma, 1918), which was a popular success and led to a series of Lubitsch/Negri collaborations, each larger in scale than the previous film. The next was Carmen (1918, reissued in the United States in 1921 as Gypsy Blood), which was followed by Madame Dubarry (1919, released in the U.S. as Passion). Madame Dubarry became a huge international success, brought down the American embargo on German films, and launched a demand that briefly threatened to dislodge Hollywood's dominance in the international film market. Negri and Lubitsch made three German films together after this, Sumurun (aka One Arabian Night, 1920), Die Bergkatze (aka The Mountain Cat or The Wildcat, 1921), and Die Flamme (The Flame, 1922), and UFA employed Negri for films with other directors, including Vendetta (1919) and Sappho (1921), many of which were purchased by American distributors and shown in the United States.

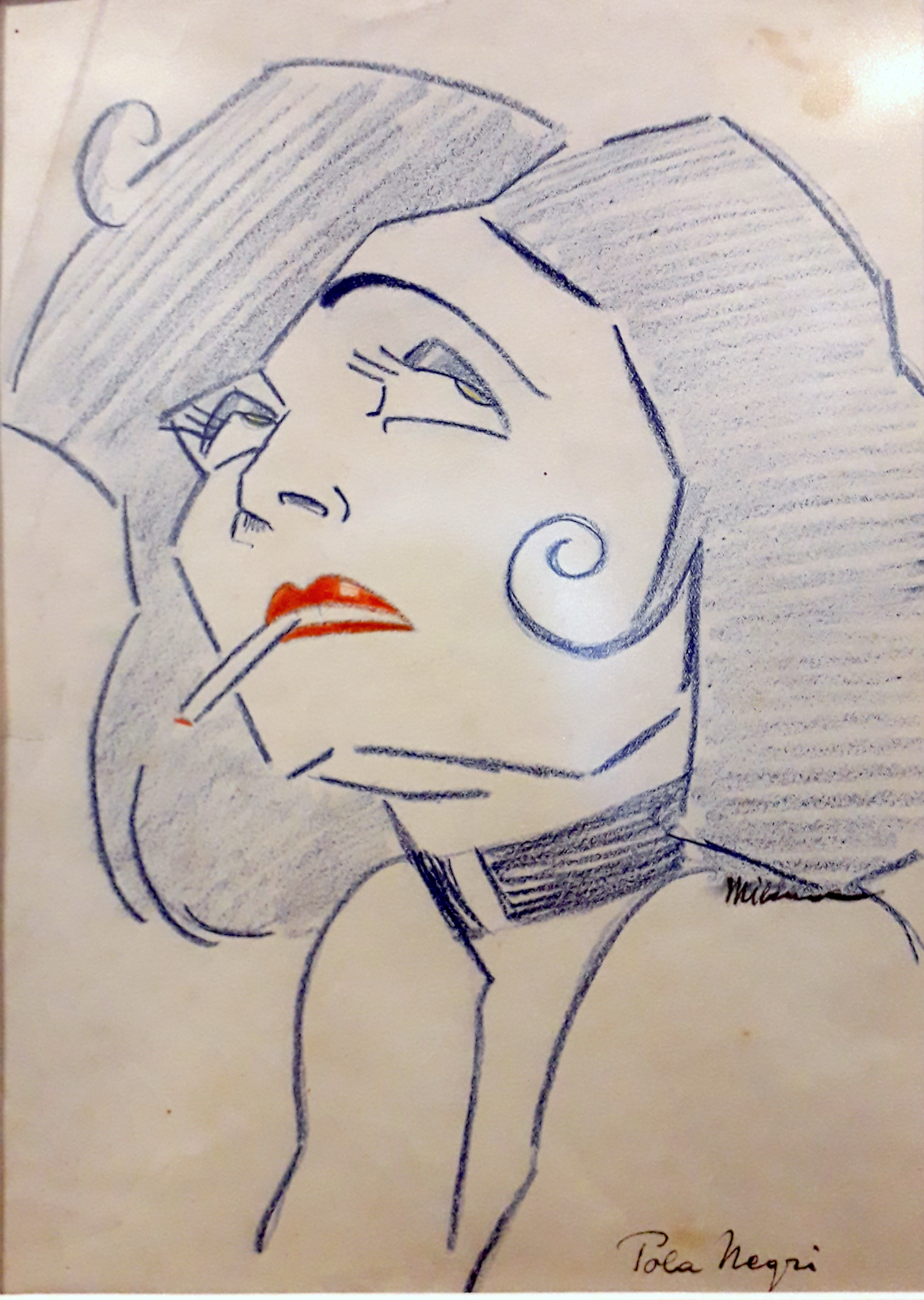
Drawing of Pola Negri by Milena Pavlović-Barili

Hollywood responded to this new threat by buying out key German talent, beginning with the procuration of the services of Lubitsch and Negri. Lubitsch was the first director to be brought to Hollywood, with Mary Pickford calling for his services in her costume film Rosita (1923). Paramount Pictures mogul Jesse Lasky saw the premiere of Madame Dubarry in Berlin in 1919, and Paramount invited Negri to come to Hollywood in 1921. She signed a $3,000 a week contract with Paramount and arrived in New York in a flurry of publicity on 12 September 1922. This made Negri the first-ever Continental star to be imported into Hollywood, setting a precedent for imported European stars that included Vilma Bánky, Greta Garbo, and Marlene Dietrich, among many others. The Hot Dog, a Cleveland monthly publication, in its own promotional advertisement for Paramount in February 1922, claimed Negri's true name was Paula Schwartz, and that she was Jewish, which was completely untrue.

=== Paramount period ===
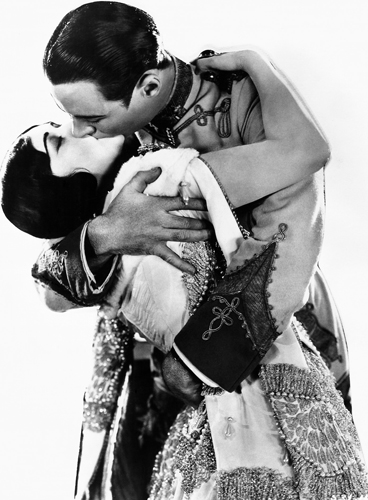
Negri and Rod La Rocque in a publicity portrait for Forbidden Paradise (1924)

Negri ended up becoming one of the most popular Hollywood actresses of the era, and certainly the richest woman of the film industry at the time, living in a mansion in Los Angeles modeled after the White House. While in Hollywood, she started several ladies' fashion trends, some of which are still fashion staples today, including red painted toenails, fur boots, and turbans. Negri was a frequent photography subject of Hollywood portrait photographer Eugene Robert Richee, and several photographs of her were taken during this period.

Negri's first two Paramount films were Bella Donna (1923) and The Cheat (1923), both of which were directed by George Fitzmaurice and were remakes of Paramount films from 1915. Her first spectacle film was the Herbert Brenon-directed The Spanish Dancer (1923), based on the Victor Hugo novel Don César de Bazan. The initial screenplay was intended as a vehicle for Rudolph Valentino before he left Paramount and was reworked for Negri. Rosita, Lubitsch's film with Mary Pickford, was released the same year and happened to be based on Don César de Bazan. According to the book Paramount Pictures and the People Who Made Them, "Critics had a field day comparing the two. The general opinion was that the Pickford film was more polished, but the Negri film was more entertaining."

Initially Paramount used Negri as a mysterious European femme fatale and a clothes horse as they had done with Gloria Swanson and staged an ongoing feud between the two actresses, which actor Charlie Chaplin recalled in his autobiography as "a mélange of cooked-up jealousies and quarrels." Negri was concerned that Paramount was mishandling her career and image and arranged for her former director Ernst Lubitsch to direct her in the critically acclaimed Forbidden Paradise (1924). It was the last time the two worked together in any film. By 1925, Negri's on-screen continental opulence was starting to wear thin with some segments of the American audience, a situation parodied in the Mal St. Clair-directed comedy A Woman of the World (1925), in which Negri starred.

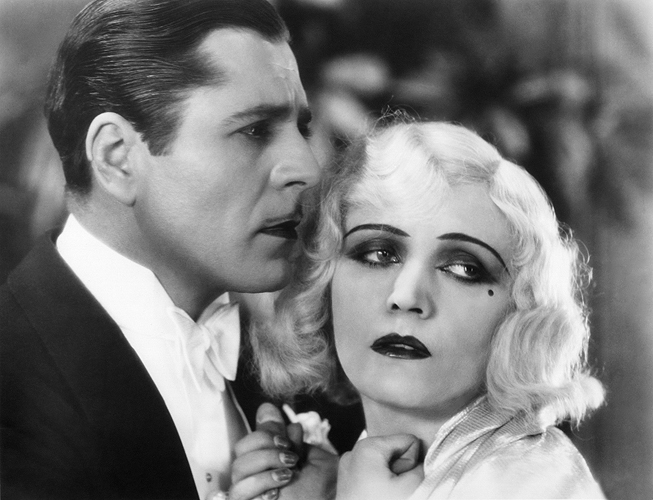
Negri with Warner Baxter in a publicity still for Three Sinners (1928)

In 1926, Negri starred in The Crown of Lies and Good and Naughty, the former of which earned an unfavorable review in Photoplay magazine, which deemed it an "impossible Pola Negri vehicle. If you have nothing else to do—see this and suffer with Pola." Paramount transitioned into casting Negri in international peasant roles the following year in films such as the Mauritz Stiller-directed and Erich Pommer-produced Hotel Imperial (1927), in an apparent effort to give her a more down-to-earth, relatable image. Although Hotel Imperial reportedly fared well at the box office, her next film Barbed Wire (1927), directed by Rowland V. Lee, and a number of subsequent films did not, reportedly due to negative publicity about her behavior at Rudolph Valentino's funeral (she fainted a few times and cried exaggeratedly) and her rebound marriage to Georgian prince Serge Mdivani, although her films continued to fare well internationally. Negri defended herself, saying: "It is difficult for a foreigner coming to America...I had been told so much what not to do. It was particularly difficult for me, a Slav. My emotion seemed exaggerated to Americans. I cannot help that I haven't the Anglo-Saxon restraint and tact."

In 1928 Negri was earning $10,000 a week, and was directed by Rowland V. Lee in another three films (The Secret Hour, Three Sinners, and Loves of an Actress), before making her last film for Paramount Pictures, The Woman from Moscow, with Norman Kerry. Negri claimed in her autobiography she opted not to renew her contract with Paramount, choosing to retire from films and live as a wife at the Château de Rueil-Seraincourt, near Vigny that she owned and where she had married her second husband. The same year, her short volume featuring reflections on art and film, La Vie et Le Rêve au Cinéma (lit. English: Life and Dreams of the Cinema), edited by Albin Michel, was published. By 1929, she had reportedly earned $5 million.

=== Later films; return to UFA ===
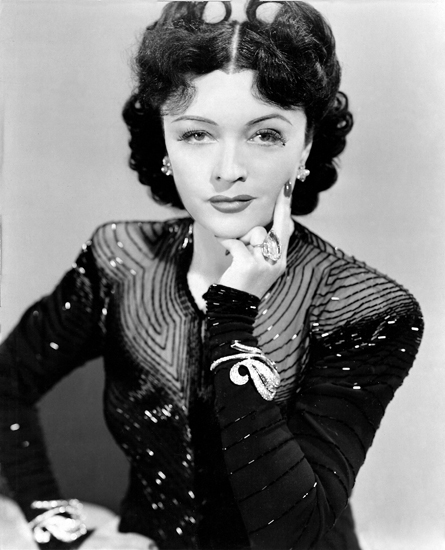
Negri in a publicity portrait from Hi Diddle Diddle (1943)

Negri's initial 1928 retirement turned out to be short-lived. She miscarried and later learned that her husband was gambling her fortune away on speculative business ventures, which strained their relationship. She went back to acting when an independent production company offered her work in a British film production that was to be distributed by Gaumont-British. Initially the film was to be a filmed version of George Bernard Shaw's Caesar and Cleopatra, and Shaw offered to alter the play to suit the film. When the rights proved to be too expensive, the company settled on an original story and hired German Kammerspielfilm director Paul Czinner to direct. The resulting film, The Way of Lost Souls (also known as The Woman He Scorned), was released in 1929; it was Negri's final silent film.

Negri returned to Hollywood in 1931 to begin filming her first talking film, A Woman Commands (1932). The film itself was poorly received, but Negri's rendition of the song "Paradise", the centerpiece of the film, became a sizable hit in the sheet music format. The song became a minor standard and was covered by many other performers, including Russ Columbo, Louis Prima and Keely Smith. Negri went on a successful vaudeville tour to promote the song. She then was employed in the leading role of the touring theatre production A Trip to Pressburg, which premiered at the Shubert Theatre in New York. However, she collapsed after the final curtain at the production's stop in Pittsburgh, Pennsylvania, due to gallbladder inflammation, and was unable to complete the tour. Negri returned to France to appear in Fanatisme (Fanaticism, 1934), a historical costume film about Napoleon III. The film was directed by the directorial team of Tony Lekain and Gaston Ravel and released by Pathé. It was her only French film.

After this, actor-director Willi Forst brought Negri to Germany to appear in the film Mazurka (1935). The film was considered "artistically valuable" (German: künstlerisch wertvoll) by the Reichsfilmkammer. Mazurka gained much popularity in Germany and abroad and became one of Adolf Hitler's favorite films, a fact that, along with her admiring comments about the efficiency of the German film industry, gave birth to a rumor in 1937 of Negri having had an affair with Hitler. Negri sued Pour Vous, the French magazine which had circulated the rumor, for libel, and won. Mazurka was remade (almost shot-for-shot) in the U.S. as Confession (1937), starring Kay Francis.

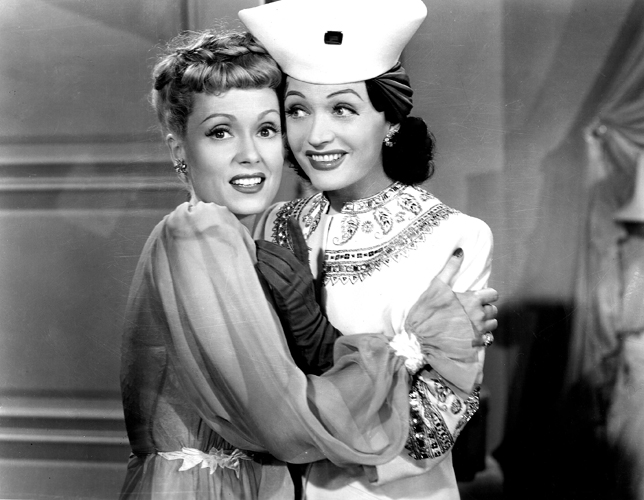
Martha Scott and Negri in a publicity still from Hi Diddle Diddle (1943)

After the success of Mazurka, Negri's former studio, the now Joseph Goebbels-controlled UFA, signed Negri to a new contract. Negri lived in France while working for UFA, making five films with the company: Moscow–Shanghai (1936), Madame Bovary, Tango Notturno (both 1937), Die fromme Lüge ("The Secret Lie", 1938), and Die Nacht der Entscheidung ("The Night of Decision", 1938).

After the Nazis took over France, Negri fled back to the United States. During her flight, she spent some days in Portugal. She stayed in Monte Estoril, at the Hotel Atlântico, between 28 and 30 June 1940. The following day she moved to Estoril's Hotel Palácio. She sailed to New York from Lisbon, Portugal, and initially lived by selling off jewelry. She was hired in a supporting role as the temperamental opera singer Genya Smetana for the 1943 comedy Hi Diddle Diddle. After the success of this film, Negri was offered numerous roles which were essentially rehashes of her role in Hi Diddle Diddle, all of which she turned down as derivative. In 1944, Negri was engaged by booking agent Miles Ingalls for a nationwide vaudeville tour. According to her autobiography, she also appeared in a Boston supper club engagement in 1945 for a repertoire centered around the song "Paradise", and retired from the entertainment business altogether.

=== Retirement and final appearances ===
In 1948, director Billy Wilder approached Negri to appear as Norma Desmond in the film Sunset Boulevard (1950), after Mae Murray, Mae West, Greta Garbo, Norma Shearer, and Mary Pickford declined the role. Negri reportedly declined the role and was aghast that Paramount could even suggest that she was a "has been". She also felt that the screenplay was not ready and that Montgomery Clift, who was slated to play the Joe Gillis character at the time, was not a good choice for the character. The role of Gillis eventually went to William Holden, and Gloria Swanson accepted the role of Norma Desmond.

Negri came out of retirement to appear in the Walt Disney film The Moon-Spinners (1964), which starred Hayley Mills and Eli Wallach. Negri's appearance in the film as eccentric jewel collector Madame Habib was shot in London over the course of two weeks. While she was filming The Moon-Spinners she made a sensation by appearing before the London press at her hotel in the company of a feisty cheetah, which had also appeared in the film, on a steel chain leash. The same year, she received an honorary award from the German film industry for her film work, followed by a Hemis-Film award in San Antonio in 1968. In 1970 she published her autobiography Memoirs of a Star, published by Doubleday. She made an appearance at the Museum of Modern Art on 30 April 1970, for a screening event in her honor, which featured her film A Woman of the World (1925) and selections from her films. Negri was a guest of honor at the 1972 screening of Carmen held at the Witte Museum in San Antonio. In 1975, director Vincente Minnelli approached Negri to appear as the Contessa Sanziani in A Matter of Time, but Negri did not accept due to poor health. In 1978, Billy Wilder directed Fedora, and although Negri does not appear in the film, the title character was reportedly based largely on her. Her final high-profile coverage in her lifetime was for a "Where Are They Now?" feature on silent film stars, which appeared in Life magazine in 1980.

== Personal life ==
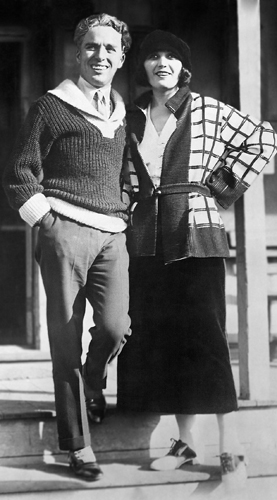
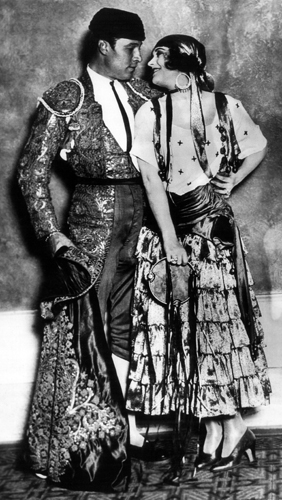
Negri's best-known personal relationships were those with Charlie Chaplin (left) and Rudolph Valentino (right).

Negri's first marriage was with Count Eugeniusz Dąbski, and proved to be short-lived. Negri married Dąbski in St Mary's Assumption Church in Sosnowiec on 5 November 1919, thus becoming Countess Apolonia Dąbska-Chałupec. After a long separation period, Negri and Dąbski's union was dissolved in 1922.

After she began working in the United States, she made headlines and gossip columns with a string of celebrity love affairs, most notably with film stars Charlie Chaplin, Rod La Rocque, and Rudolph Valentino. Negri had met Chaplin while in Germany, and what began as a platonic relationship became a well-publicized affair and marriage speculation which received the headline "The Queen of Tragedy to Wed the King of Comedy." The relationship soured, and Negri became involved for a time with actor Rod La Rocque, who appeared as her leading man in Forbidden Paradise (1924). Negri met Rudolph Valentino at a costume party hosted by Marion Davies and William Randolph Hearst at the San Simeon estate and was reportedly Valentino's lover until his death in 1926. She caused a media sensation at his New York funeral on 24 August 1926, at which she "fainted" several times, and according to actor Ben Lyon, arranged for a large floral arrangement that spelled "P-O-L-A" to be placed on Valentino's coffin. The press dismissed her actions as a publicity stunt. At the time of his death and for the remainder of her life, Negri claimed Valentino was the love of her life.

Just before the Wall Street crash of 1929, The New York Times estimated Negri's personal worth at $5 million.

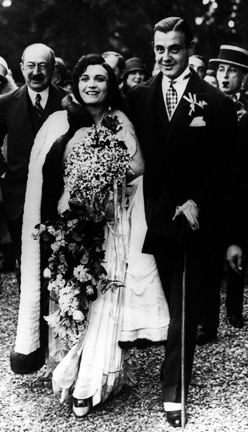
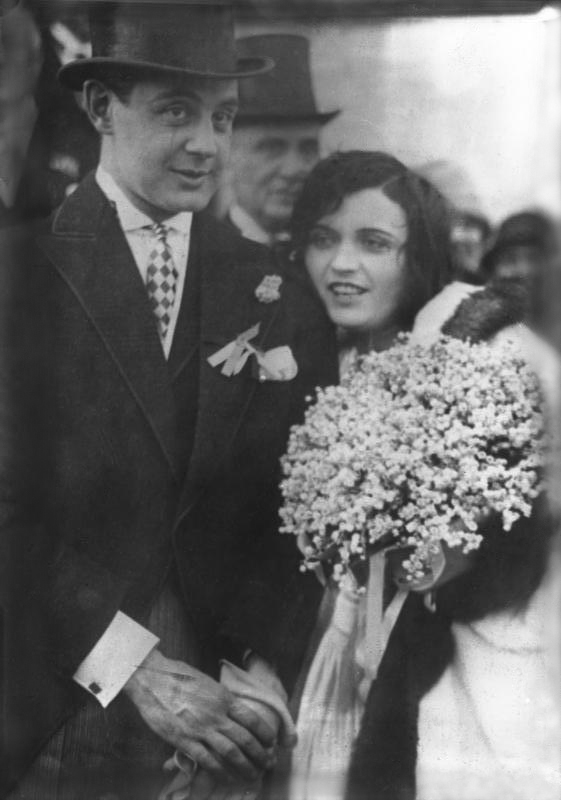
Negri and her second husband Serge Mdivani on their wedding day, 14 May 1927

Negri soon married again, to the Georgian self-styled "Prince" Serge Mdivani. This action caused public opinion in the United States to sour against her because it happened so quickly after Rudolph Valentino's death. Negri and Mdivani were married on 14 May 1927 (less than nine months after Valentino's death); shortly after she became pregnant, and Negri, who always wanted a child, started taking better care of her health and even considered retiring from movies in order to be a housewife and mother. However, she reportedly suffered a miscarriage. She grieved the loss of her child for the rest of her life; she and Mdivani divorced on 2 April 1931.

While residing at the Ambassador Hotel in New York in April 1932, Negri performed with Russ Columbo in George Jessel's variety revue at the Schubert Theatre and was briefly involved with Columbo. After her film A Woman Commands premiered in Hollywood, Columbo performed Negri's signature song "Paradise" with his orchestra and dedicated the song to her. Columbo also recorded and released the song as a 78 rpm single that year with slightly altered lyrics, and the single became a huge sensation with audiences across the country.

When Negri returned to the United States in the early 1940s, she became close friends with Margaret West, an oil heiress, former radio star and vaudeville actress, whom she had originally met in the 1930s. The two became housemates, sharing a beachfront home in Los Angeles with Negri's then-88-year-old mother and later in Bel Air. Negri, who remained a devout Catholic in her later life, spent her time raising funds for Catholic charities with both her mother and West. On 12 January 1951, Negri became a naturalized citizen of the United States. After the death of Negri's mother in 1954 of pancreatic cancer, in 1957, Negri and West relocated from Los Angeles to a suite in the Menger Hotel, San Antonio, Texas and later to a large home in Olmos Park, Texas. Negri lived with West until the latter's death of heart failure in 1963. Negri moved out of the home she had shared with West into a townhouse located at 7707 Broadway in San Antonio, where she spent the remainder of her years, largely out of the public eye.

Some scholars, such as Emily Leider, a Rudolph Valentino biographer, have suggested that Negri was bisexual, and that she and West, who lived together from 1948 to 1963 were romantic partners. Negri biographer Sergio Delgado contests this, though he notes in his 2016 book Pola Negri: Temptress of Silent Hollywood, that there is "strong anecdotal evidence" that Negri was bisexual.

== Death ==
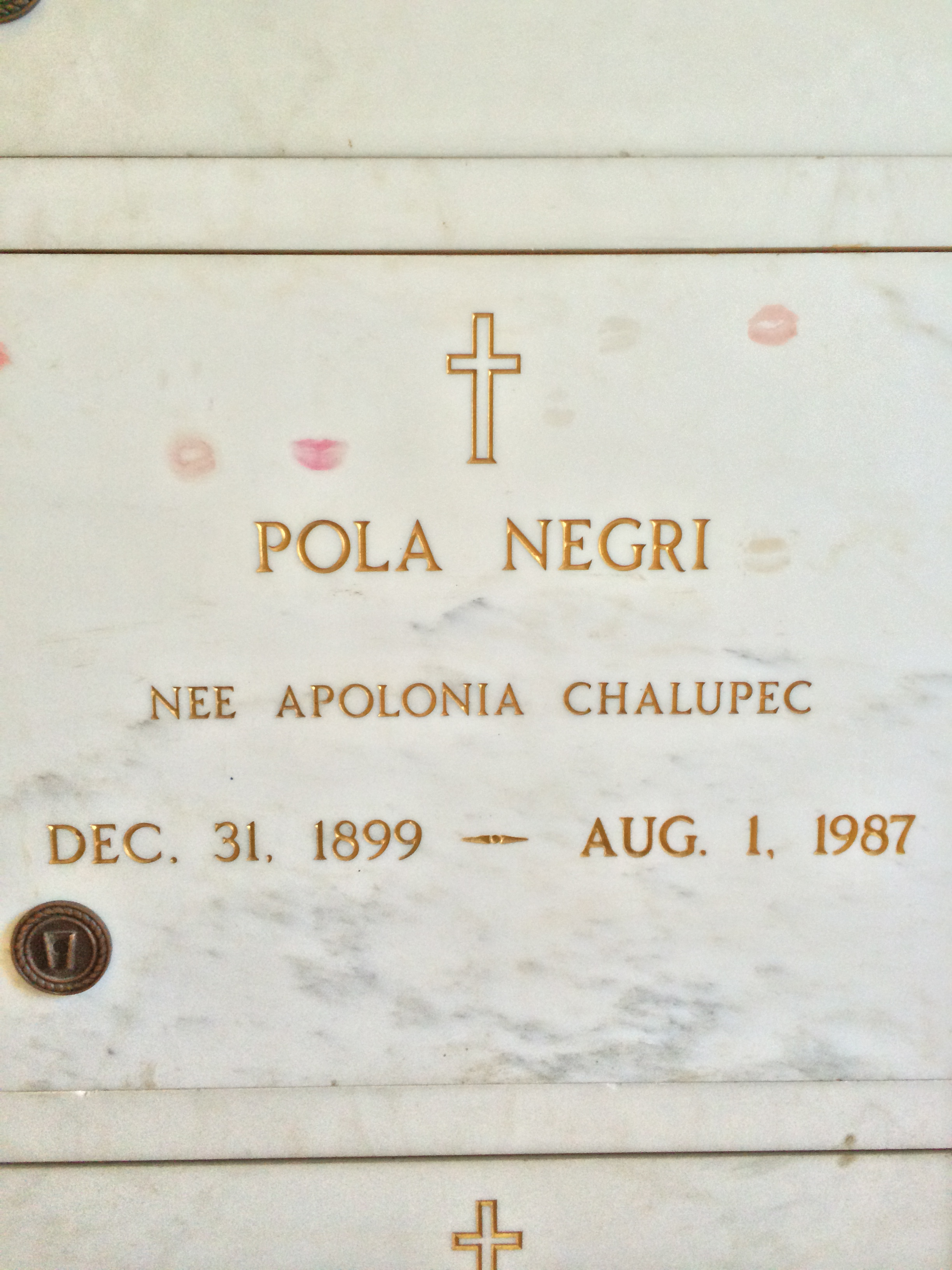
Crypt of Negri at Calvary Cemetery, bearing her incorrect birthdate

Pola Negri died on 1 August 1987, aged 90 at the Northeast Baptist Hospital in San Antonio, Texas. Her death was caused by pneumonia for which she had been rushed to the hospital a week earlier; however, she was also suffering from a brain tumor, for which she had refused treatment for two years. At her wake at the Porter Loring Funeral Home in San Antonio, her body was placed on view wearing a yellow golden chiffon dress with a golden turban to match. Her death received extensive coverage in her hometown newspapers San Antonio Light, and San Antonio Express-News, and in publications such as The Washington Post, Los Angeles Times, The New York Times, UPI, and Variety.

Negri was interred in Calvary Cemetery, East Los Angeles next to her mother Eleonora, who died in 1954 from pancreatic cancer. As Negri had no children or siblings, she left most of her estate to St. Mary's University, in Texas, including a collection of memorabilia and several rare prints of her films. St. Mary's University also set up a scholarship in her name. In addition, a generous portion of her estate was given to the Polish nuns of the Seraphic Order.

== Legacy ==
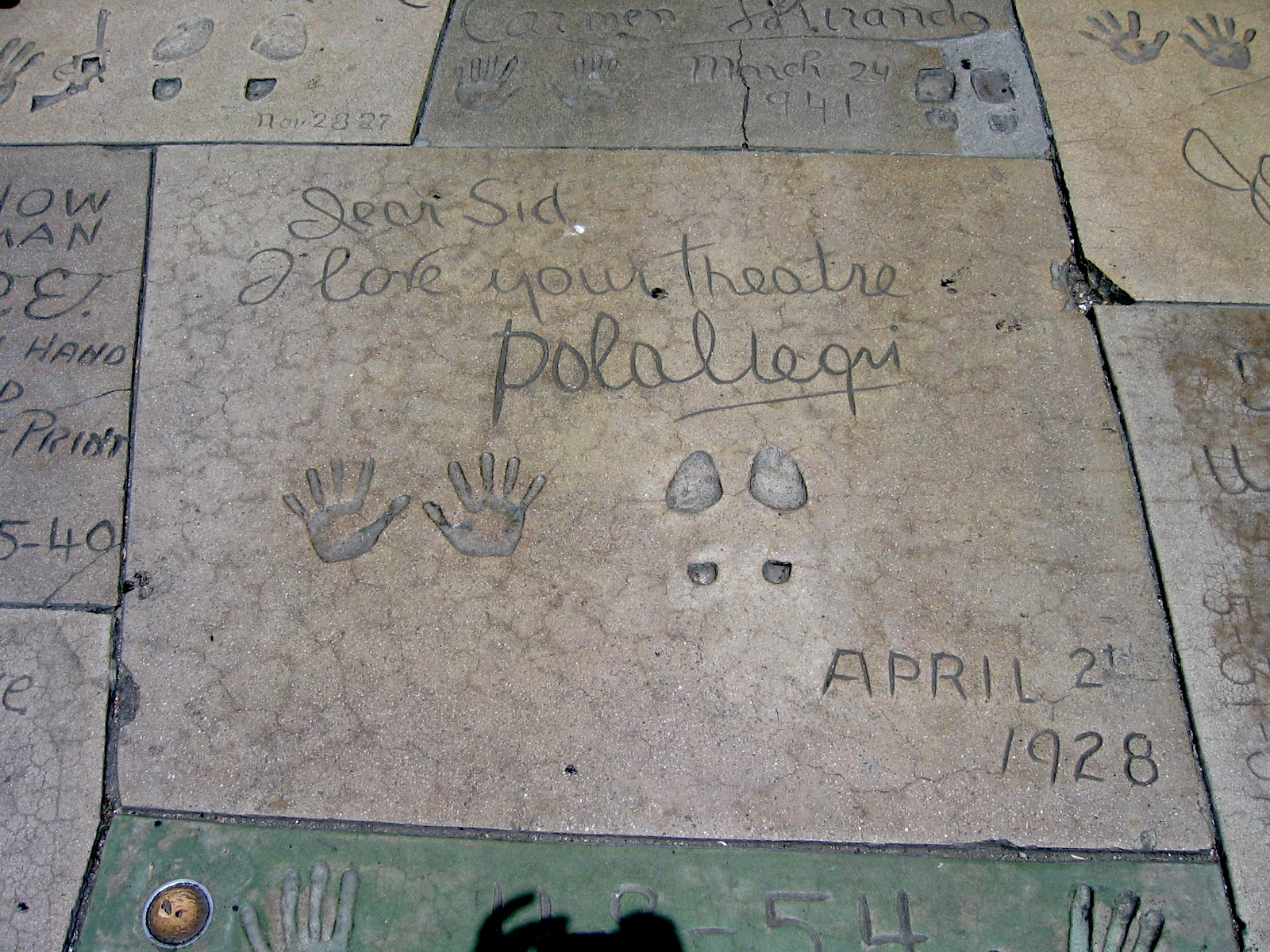
Signature and prints of Negri's hands and feet in front of Grauman's Chinese Theatre

Negri has a star on the Hollywood Walk of Fame for her contribution to Motion Pictures at 6933 Hollywood Boulevard. She was the 11th star in Hollywood history to place her hand and foot prints in front of Grauman's Chinese Theatre. She received a star in Poland's Walk of Fame(pl) in Łódź and Poland's post office issued a postage stamp honoring her in 1996. The Polish Film Festival of Los Angeles remembered her with the Pola Negri Award, given to outstanding film artists, and the Pola Negri Museum in Lipno gives a Polita award for outstanding artist achievement.

Negri, with Theda Bara and Mae Murray, were the actresses whose eyes were combined to form the Chicago International Film Festival's logo, a stark, black and white close up of the composite eyes set as repeated frames in a strip of film. It was created by Festival Founder and Artistic Director Michael Kutza.

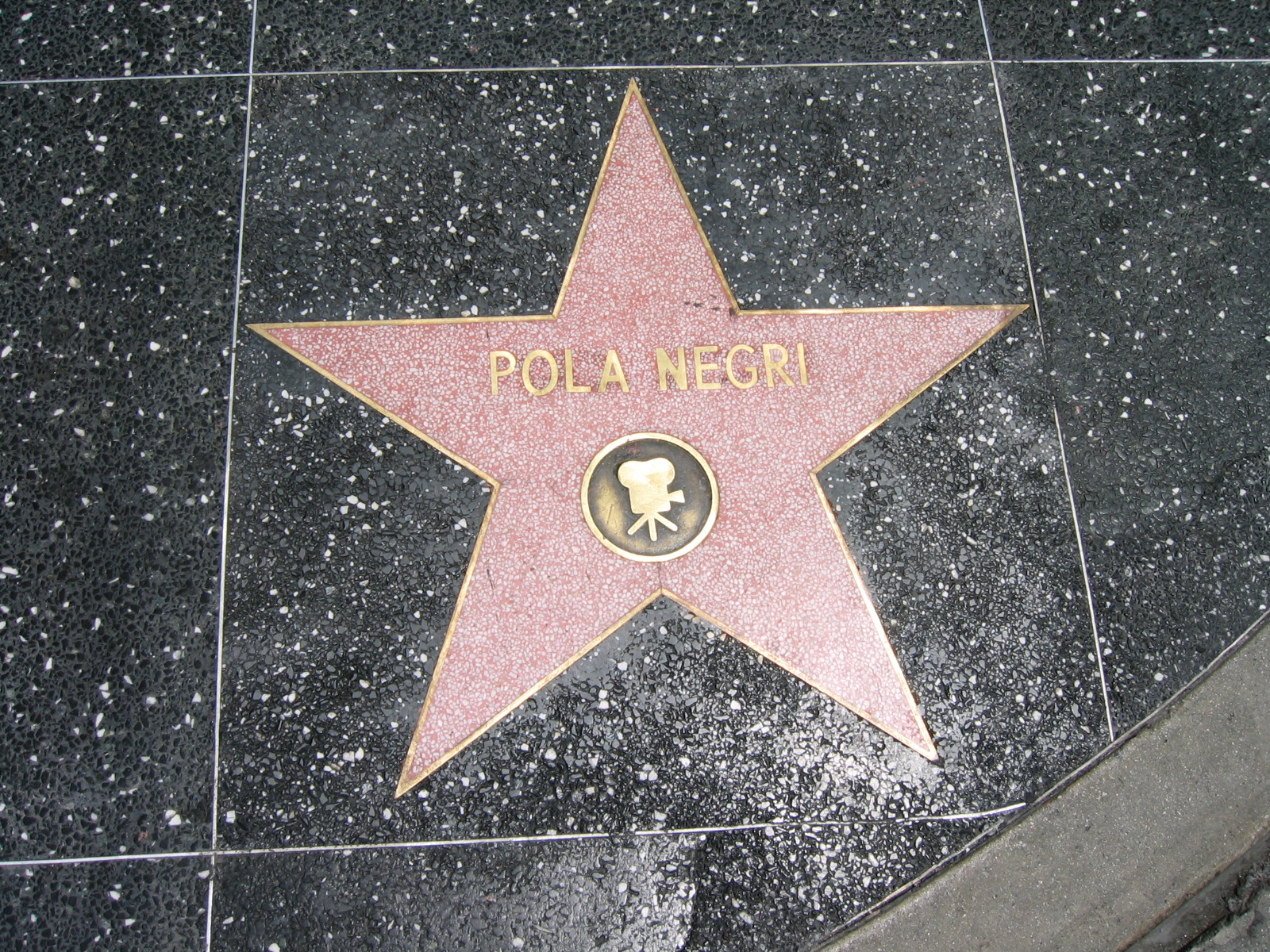
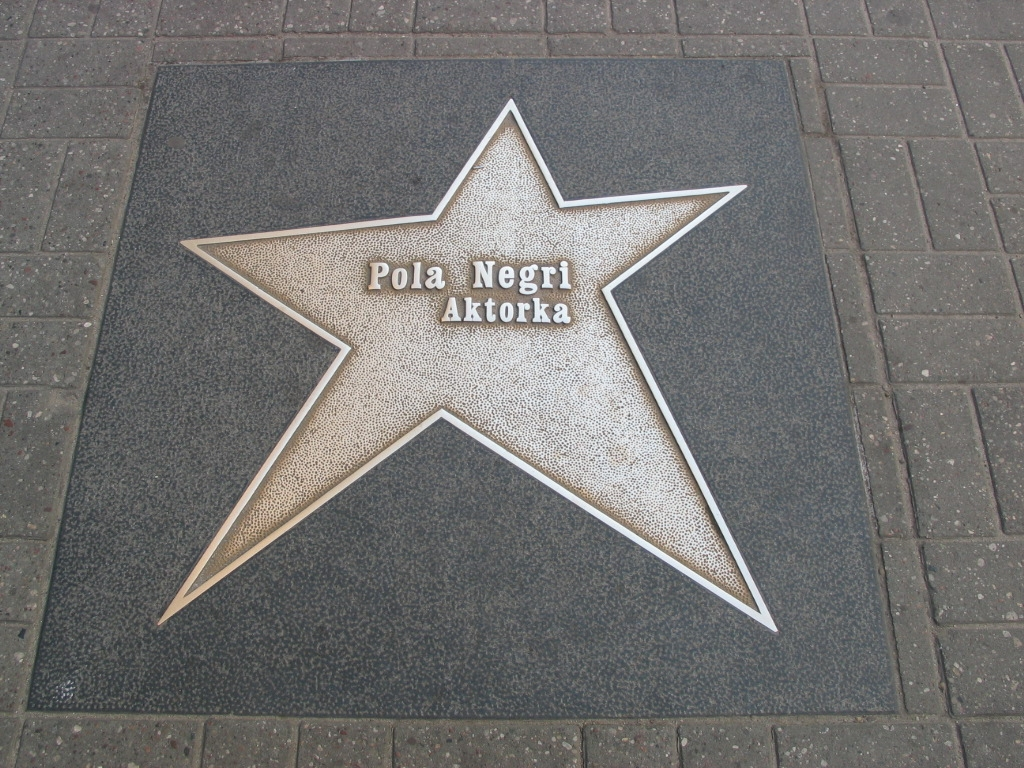
Negri's stars in the Hollywood Walk of Fame, and in the Walk of Fame in Łódź, Poland

Negri (portrayed by an uncredited dancer/actress) makes a cameo appearance in the TV film Young Indiana Jones and the Hollywood Follies. In the film, Indiana Jones and Claire Lieberman attend a Hollywood party, where they spot Negri dancing with Valentino.

In 2006, a feature-length documentary about Negri's life, Pola Negri: Life Is a Dream in Cinema, premiered at the Seventh Annual Polish Film Festival of Los Angeles. The film was directed by Negri's biographer, Mariusz Kotowski, and includes in-depth interviews with Hayley Mills and Eli Wallach, who starred in Negri's final film The Moon-Spinners (1964). Pola Negri: Life Is a Dream in Cinema has played at Negri retrospective screenings in Europe and the U.S., most notably at the Museum of Modern Art in New York and at the Cinémathèque Française in Paris.

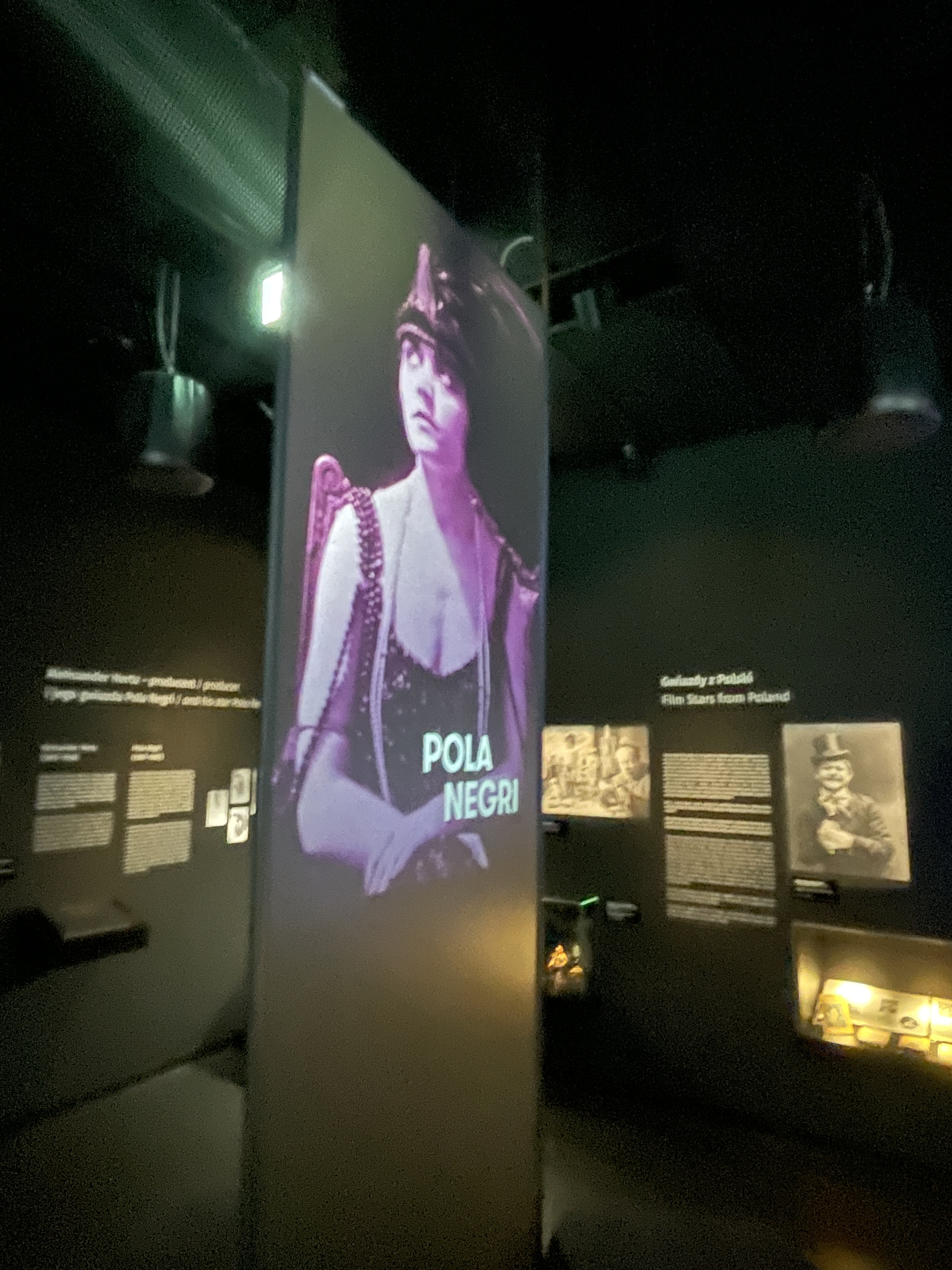
Exhibit devoted to Pola Negri at the National Centre for Film Culture in Łódź, Poland

Kotowski wrote a Polish-language biography of Negri titled Pola Negri: Legenda Hollywood (English title: Pola Negri: Hollywood Legend), released in Poland on 24 February 2011, and an English-language biography Pola Negri: Hollywood's First Femme Fatale, published by the University Press of Kentucky on 8 April 2014. Kotowski produced a 3-disc DVD compilation of early Negri films, Pola Negri, The Iconic Collection: The Early Years (2011).

A large black and white portrait of Negri hangs in the small chapel of the Seraphic Sisters of the Third Order of St. Francis of Assisi Congregation, next to Poland's patron, at Shrine of Our Lady of Częstochowa, at 138 Beethoven Street, in San Antonio.

A 1924 portrait of Negri, by Tadeusz "Tadé" Styka (1889–1954), son of Jan Styka, is part of the San Antonio Museum of Art's permanent collection.

In November 2018, a monument to Pola Negri, was set at Our Lady of the Bright Mount Church, Los Angeles. In 2021, a street in Bydgoszcz, where she briefly lived in 1920s, was named after her.

== Filmography ==
Key
†	Denotes a lost or presumed lost film

=== In Congress Poland and Regency Kingdom ===
Year	Film	Director	Company	Notes	Ref.
1914	Slave of the Senses †	Aleksander Hertz	Sphinx Company	Alternate titles: Niewolnica zmysłów, Der Sklave der Sinne, lit. English: Slave of Sin; Poland's first feature film	
1915	Żona †	Aleksander Hertz	Sphinx Company	lit. English: Wife	
1915	Czarna książka †	Aleksander Hertz	Sphinx Company	lit. English: The Yellow Pass; An early version of Der Gelbe Schein (The Yellow Ticket)	
1916	Studenci †	Aleksander Hertz	Sphinx Company	lit. English: Students	
1917	Bestia	Aleksander Hertz	Sphinx Company	lit. English: Beast; Alternate titles: The Polish Dancer (U.S. release title), Bad Girl	
1917	Tajemnica alei Ujazdowskich †	Aleksander Hertz	Sphinx Company	lit. English: Mystery of Uyazdovsky Avenue; Part of the Tajemnice Warszawy (Mysteries of Warsaw) serial	
1917	Pokój Nr. 13 †	Aleksander Hertz	Sphinx Company	lit. English: Room #13; Part of the Tajemnice Warszawy (Mysteries of Warsaw) serial	
1917	Arabella †	Aleksander Hertz	Sphinx Company	Note: Though the majority of the film is presumed lost, a short fragment survives, as it was used in Polish film O czym się nie mówi (1939).	
1917	Jego ostatni czyn †	Aleksander Hertz	Sphinx Company	lit. English: His Last Gesture	

=== In Germany (silent period) ===
Year	Film	Director	Company	Notes	Ref.
1917	Nicht lange täuschte mich das Glück †	Kurt Matull	Saturn-Film AG	Negri plays a dual supporting role as a nun and a cabaret dancer	
1917	Zügelloses Blut †	Unknown	Saturn-Film AG		
1917	Küsse, die man stiehlt im Dunkeln †	Unknown	Saturn-Film AG	lit. English: Kisses Stolen in the Dark	
1917	Die toten Augen †	Unknown	Saturn-Film AG	lit. English: Dead Eyes	
1917	When the Heart Burns with Hate	Kurt Matull	Saturn-Film AG	German: Wenn das Herz in Haß erglüht This film survives and has been shown at La Cinémathèque Française in Paris, France, and at the Museum of Cinematography in Łódź, Poland	
1918	Rosen, die der Sturm entblättert †	Unknown	Saturn-Film AG		
1918	Mania	Eugen Illés	UFA	Set design by Paul Leni; Full title: Mania, Die Geschichte einer Zigarettenarbeiterin (Mania: The Story of a Cigarette Girl).	
1918	Die Augen der Mumie Ma	Ernst Lubitsch	UFA	lit. English: The Eyes of Mummy Ma; Co-stars: Harry Liedtke and Emil Jannings; First Negri/Lubitsch collaboration	
1918	Der gelbe Schein	Victor Janson and Eugen Illés	UFA	Co-stars: Harry Liedtke and Victor Janson; Alternate title: The Yellow Ticket	
1918	Carmen	Ernst Lubitsch	UFA	Co-star: Harry Liedtke; Alternate title: Gypsy Blood (U.S. release)	
1919	The Carousel of Life †	Georg Jacoby	UFA	Co-star: Harry Liedtke; German:Das Karussell des Lebens; Alternate title: The Last Payment (U.S. release)	
1919	Vendetta †	Georg Jacoby	UFA	Co-stars: Emil Jannings and Harry Liedtke; Alternate title: Blutrache (Blood Revenge)	
1919	Dämmerung des Todes †	Georg Jacoby	UFA		
1919	The Woman at the Crossroads †	Georg Jacoby	UFA	German: Kreuziget sie! lit. English: Crucify Them! Co-stars: Harry Liedtke and Victor Janson	
1919	Madame Dubarry	Ernst Lubitsch	UFA	Co-stars: Emil Jannings and Harry Liedtke; Alternate title: Passion (U.S. release)	
1919	Countess Doddy	Georg Jacoby	UFA	Co-stars: Harry Liedtke and Victor Janson; Alternate title: Komtesse Dolly	
1920	The Marquise of Armiani †	Alfred Halm	UFA	German: Die Marchesa d'Armiani	
1920	Sumurun	Ernst Lubitsch	UFA	Co-stars: Ernst Lubitsch, Paul Wegener, Harry Liedtke, and Jenny Hasselqvist; Alternate title: One Arabian night (U.S. release); A film remake of the Max Reinhardt theater production, which also featured Negri and Lubitsch in the same respective roles, this is the only time the two appeared on screen together and is the last time the Lubitsch appeared on-screen as an actor.	
1920	Intrigue †	Paul Ludwig Stein	UFA	German: Das Martyrium lit. English: The Martyrium	
1920	The Closed Chain †	Paul Ludwig Stein	UFA	Die geschlossene Kette; Alternate title: Intrigue (U.S. release)	
1920	The Red Peacock	Paul Ludwig Stein	UFA	German: Arme Violetta lit. English: Poor Violetta, film was rediscovered in a basement in New York in 2020	
1921	Die Bergkatze	Ernst Lubitsch	UFA	Co-stars: Victor Janson, Paul Heidemann lit. English: The Mountain Cat; Alternate title: The Wildcat; A German Expressionist comedy and parody of the Expressionist film genre	
1921	Sappho	Dimitri Buchowetzki	UFA	Co-stars: Alfred Abel and Johannes Riemann; Alternate title: Mad Love (U.S. release)	
1921	Die Flamme	Ernst Lubitsch	Ernst Lubitsch Film GmbH	lit. English: The Flame; Co-stars: Alfred Abel and Hermann Thimig; Alternate title: Montmartre (U.S. Release); Ernst Lubitsch's final German film	

=== Paramount period ===
Year	Film	Director	Company	Notes	Ref.
1923	Bella Donna	George Fitzmaurice	Famous Players–Lasky/Paramount	Co-stars: Conway Tearle, Conrad Nagel, Adolphe Menjou; Remake of the 1915 film Bella Donna starring Pauline Frederick	
1923	The Cheat †	George Fitzmaurice	Famous Players–Lasky/Paramount	Co-stars: Jack Holt and Charles de Roche; Remake of the 1915 film The Cheat starring Fannie Ward and Sessue Hayakawa	
1923	Hollywood †	James Cruze	Famous Players–Lasky/Paramount	Negri plays a cameo role in this film, which features guest appearances from many other Hollywood stars from the period	
1923	The Spanish Dancer	Herbert Brenon	Famous Players–Lasky/Paramount	Co-stars: Antonio Moreno, Wallace Beery and Adolphe Menjou	
1924	Shadows of Paris †	Herbert Brenon	Famous Players–Lasky/Paramount	Co-stars: Charles de Roche, Adolphe Menjou, and George O'Brien	
1924	Men †	Dimitri Buchowetzki	Famous Players–Lasky/Paramount		
1924	Lily of the Dust †	Dimitri Buchowetzki	Famous Players–Lasky/Paramount	Co-stars: Ben Lyon, Noah Beery, and Raymond Griffith	
1924	Forbidden Paradise	Ernst Lubitsch	Famous Players–Lasky/Paramount	Co-stars: Rod La Rocque, Adolphe Menjou, Pauline Starke, and Clark Gable (in a bit role). Only American Lubitsch/Negri collaboration and their final film together	
1925	East of Suez †	Raoul Walsh	Famous Players–Lasky/Paramount	Co-stars: Edmund Lowe and Noah Beery; Negri's only film directed by Raoul Walsh	
1925	The Charmer †	Sidney Olcott	Famous Players–Lasky/Paramount	Co-stars: Wallace MacDonald and Cesare Gravina	
1925	Flower of Night †	Paul Bern	Famous Players–Lasky/Paramount	Co-stars: Warner Oland, Gustav von Seyffertitz	
1925	A Woman of the World	Malcolm St. Clair	Famous Players–Lasky/Paramount	Co-stars: Charles Emmett Mack, Holmes Herbert, Chester Conklin	
1926	The Crown of Lies †	Dimitri Buchowetzki	Famous Players–Lasky/Paramount		
1926	Good and Naughty †	Malcolm St. Clair	Famous Players–Lasky/Paramount	Co-stars: Ford Sterling and Miss DuPont	
1927	Hotel Imperial	Mauritz Stiller	Famous Players–Lasky/Paramount	Co-stars: James Hall, George Siegmann, and Max Davidson; Broke box-office records for highest ticket sales	
1927	Barbed Wire	Rowland V. Lee; Mauritz Stiller	Paramount	Co-stars: Clive Brook, Einar Hanson, and Gustav von Seyffertitz; Mauritz Stiller started the film, but was replaced with Rowland V. Lee early on in the film	
1927	The Woman on Trial †	Mauritz Stiller	Paramount	Note: While mostly lost, surviving fragments are owned by the Museum of Modern Art.	
1928	The Secret Hour †	Rowland V. Lee	Paramount		
1928	Three Sinners †	Rowland V. Lee	Paramount	Co-stars: Warner Baxter, Paul Lukas, and Olga Baclanova	
1928	Loves of an Actress †	Rowland V. Lee	Paramount	Co-stars: Nils Asther and Paul Lukas; Silent film with soundtrack	
1928	The Woman from Moscow †	Ludwig Berger	Paramount	Co-stars: Norman Kerry, Paul Lukas, and Otto Matiesen; Alternate title: Rachel; Silent film with soundtrack Incomplete film	

=== International (sound period) ===
Year	Film	Director	Company	Country	Notes	Ref.
1929	The Woman He Scorned	Paul Czinner	Charles Whittaker Productions UK (Distributed By Warners UK)	United Kingdom	Co-stars: Hans Rehmann, Warwick Ward; Alternate Titles: The Way of Lost Souls, Street of Abandoned Children; Silent film with soundtrack. Negri's final silent film.	
1932	A Woman Commands	Paul L. Stein	RKO	United States	Co-stars: Basil Rathbone, Roland Young, H.B. Warner; Alternate title: Maria Draga; Negri's first sound film; features the songs "Paradise", "I Wanna Be Kissed", "Promise You Will Remember Me". "Paradise" was a major hit and a went on to become a standard for many years; it was covered by Russ Columbo and Louis Prima, featured in the television show Adventures in Paradise, and used as soundtrack music for other films from the time.	
1934	Fanatisme	Tony Lekain, Gaston Ravel	Pathé	France	Negri's only French film; features her singing three songs	
1935	Mazurka	Willi Forst	Cine-Allianz/Tobis-Klangfilm	Germany	Co-stars: Ingeborg Theek, Paul Hartmann, and Albrecht Schoenhals; Features the songs "Je sens en moi", "Mazurka", and "Nur eine Stunde". Remade in 1937 by Warner Brothers as Confession starring Kay Francis and directed by Austrian director Joe May	
1936	Moscow–Shanghai	Paul Wegener	UFA	Germany	Co-star: Gustav Diessl; German: Moskau-Shanghai; Alternate titles: Von Moskau nach Shanghai, Der Weg nach Shanghai, Begegnung in Shanghai, Zwischen Moskau und Shanghai; Features the song "Mein Herz hat Heimweh..."	
1937	Madame Bovary	Gerhard Lamprecht	UFA	Germany	Negri's only German sound film to be shown in the United States	
1937	Tango Notturno	Fritz Kirchhoff	UFA	Germany	Co-star: Albrecht Schoenhals; Features the songs "Ich hab an Dich Gedacht" and "Kommt das Glück nicht heut'? Dann kommt es morgen"	
1938	The Secret Lie	Nunzio Malasomma	UFA	Germany	German: Die fromme Lüge; Co-star: Hermann Braun	
1938	The Night of Decision	Nunzio Malasomma	UFA	Germany	German: Die Nacht der Entscheidung; Co-star: Iván Petrovich; Features the songs "Siehst Du die Sterne am Himmel" and "Zeig' der Welt nicht Dein Herz"	

=== Last films (U.S.) ===
Year	Film	Director	Company	Notes	Ref.
1943	Hi Diddle Diddle	Andrew L. Stone	Andrew L. Stone Productions (Distributed by United Artists)	Co-stars: Adolphe Menjou, Martha Scott, Billie Burke, Dennis O'Keefe, June Havoc	
1964	The Moon-Spinners	James Neilson	Walt Disney Productions	Co-stars: Hayley Mills, Eli Wallach	

== Discography ==
Negri released a total of ten 78 rpm singles. In 1931, she recorded seven gypsy folk songs in London accompanied by guitars and chorus, six of which were released as the sides of three records on Victor's His Master's Voice imprint. She recorded a French-language version of "Paradise" in Paris in 1933 with "Mes Nuits sont Mortes" as its flip side. (Sheet music was released for the English-language version, but the recorded version only appeared in the 1932 film, A Woman Commands, and was never released as a record.) The remainder of Negri's recordings, cut from 1935 to 1938, centered around songs that she sang in her German sound films.

Matrix No.	Single No.	Label	Song title	Time and place of recording	Notes
OB-641	HMV EK-114	His Master's Voice	V chas toski (The Hour of Longing)	Small Queen's Hall, London, 12 March 1931	Accompanied by Boris Golovka and two others on guitar, with chorus.
OB-642	HMV EK-114	His Master's Voice	Chto nam gore? (Why Are You Sorry?)	same	same
OB-643	(Not Released)	His Master's Voice	Yescho raz (Once again)	same	same
OB-647	HMV B-3820	His Master's Voice	Ochy Tchornye (Dark Eyes)	Small Queen's Hall, London, 13 March 1931	same
OB-648	HMV EK-115	His Master's Voice	Why Fall in Love?	same	same
OB-649	HMV B-3820	His Master's Voice	Adieu (Farewell, My Gypsy Camp)	same	same
OB-650	HMV EK-115	His Master's Voice	Dwe gitary (Two Guitars aka "Gypsy, Sing!")	same	same; dedicated to Pola Negri by Boris Golovka
P 76523	AP 989	Ultraphone	Mes Nuits sont Mortes	Paris, July 1933	
P 76524	AP 989	Ultraphone	Paradis	Paris, July 1933	French-language version of "Paradise"; A-side of single AP 989
P Be 10937-3	0–4723	Odéon	Mazurka (Ich Spür' In Mir...)	Berlin, 8 April 1935	Song from the film Mazurka (1935); orchestra arr. by Peter Kreuder
P Be 10938-3	0–4723	Odéon	Nur eine Stunde	Berlin, 8 April 1935	Song from the film Mazurka (1935); orchestra arr. by Peter Kreuder
128338	R 2271	Parlophone	For That One Hour of Passion	Berlin, c. early 1936	English-language version of "Nur eine Stunde". Original version from the film Mazurka.
128337	R 2271	Parlophone	Stay Close to Me	Berlin, c. early 1936	English-language version of "Ich Spür' In Mir". Original version from the film Mazurka.
P Be 11241	0–4736	Odéon	Vergiss deine Sehnsucht	Berlin, 17 March 1936	Orchestra arranged by W. Schmidt-Boelcke.
P Be 11242	0–4736	Odéon	Wenn die Sonne hinter den Dächern versinkt	Berlin, 17 March 1936	Orchestra arranged by W. Schmidt-Boelcke.
P Be 11432-2	0–4742	Odéon	Mein Herz hat Heimweh...	Berlin, 2 September 1936	Song from the film Moskau-Shanghai (1936). Orchestra arranged by Hans-Otto Borgmann.
P Be 11433	0–4742	Odéon	Ich möchte einmal nur mein ganzes Herz verschwenden	Berlin, 2 September 1936	Orchestra arranged by Hans-Otto Borgmann
P Be 11891	0–4765	Odéon	Ich hab an Dich gedacht	Berlin, 15 December 1937	Song from the film Tango Notturno (1937). Orchestra arranged by Hans-Otto Borgmann.
P Be 11892	0–4765	Odéon	Kommt das Glück nicht heut'? Dann kommt es morgen	Berlin, 15 December 1937	Song from the film Tango Notturno (1937). Orchestra arranged by Hans-Otto Borgmann.
P Be 12171	0 288233	Odéon	Zeig der Welt nicht Dein Herz	Berlin, 30 December 1938	Song from the film Die Nacht der Entscheidung (1938). Orchestra arranged by Lothar Bruhne.
P Be 12172	0 288233	Odéon	Siehst Du die Sterne	Berlin, 30 December 1938	Song from the film Die Nacht der Entscheidung (1938). Orchestra arranged by Lothar Bruhne.

== See also ==
- List of Poles

== Works cited ==
- Beinhorn, Courtenay Wyche (January 1975). The Film Career of Pola Negri, 1914–1964 (Thesis). Austin, TX: University of Texas at Austin.
- Bock, Hans-Michael (2009). The Concise Cinegraph: Encyclopedia of German Cinema. New York: Berghahn Books. ISBN 978-1-571-81655-9.
- Chaplin, Charles (1964). My Autobiography. New York: Simon and Schuster. ISBN 978-0-370-00239-2.
- Delgado, Sergi (2016). Pola Negri: Temptress of Silent Hollywood. Jefferson, North Carolina: McFarland & Company. ISBN 978-1-476-62435-8.
- Edmonds, I.G.; Mimura, Reiko (1980). Paramount Pictures and the People Who Made Them. San Diego: A.S. Barnes and Co., Inc.
- Haltof, Marek (2002). Polish National Cinema. New York: Berghahn Books. ISBN 978-1-782-38469-4.
- Koszarski, Richard. 1976. Hollywood Directors: 1914-1940. Oxford University Press. Library of Congress Catalog Number: 76-9262.
- Kotowski, Mariusz (2014). Pola Negri: Hollywood's First Femme Fatale. Lexington, KY: University Press of Kentucky. doi:10.5810/kentucky/9780813144887.001.0001. ISBN 978-0-813-14489-4.
- Kreimeier, Klaus (1999). The UFA Story: A Story of Germany's Greatest Film Company 1918–1945. Los Angeles: University of California Press. ISBN 978-0-520-22069-0.
- Lanza, Joseph; Penna, Dennis (2002). Russ Columbo and the Crooner Mystique. Port Townsend, WA: Feral House. ISBN 978-0-922-91580-4.
- Negri, Pola (1970). Memoirs of a Star. New York: Doubleday. ASIN B0006C0782.
