= Gordon Clifford (lyricist) =

- Born: March 28, 1902; Providence, Rhode Island, U.S.
- Died: June 11, 1968 (aged 66); Las Vegas, Nevada, U.S.
- Occupations: Lyricist, songwriter
- Known for: "I Surrender Dear" "It Must Be True" "Paradise"

Gordon Clifford (1902–June 11, 1968) was an American lyricist who wrote music for Hollywood films in the 1930s. His best-known songs include Nacio Herb Brown's "Paradise", Alfred Newman's "Who Am I?" and Harry Barris's "It Must Be True" and "I Surrender Dear".

Clifford was born in Rhode Island and started studying the violin as a child. In the 1920s, he wrote lyrics for The Rhythm Boys when they were appearing at the Cocoanut Grove in Los Angeles. His first success as a songwriter came in the early 1930s, when Bing Crosby recorded "It Must Be True" and "I Surrender Dear" with Gus Arnheim's orchestra. The latter song has been recorded by many artists and is considered a jazz standard. Pola Negri sang Clifford and Nacio Herb Brown's "Paradise" in the 1931 film A Woman Commands. Although the film was unsuccessful, Bing Crosby's cover version of "Paradise" became a hit.

Clifford died in a traffic accident in Las Vegas on June 11, 1968.
