= Paradise (1931 song) =

1931 popular music song

Single by Leo Reisman and His Orchestra
- B-side: "Someday I'll Find You"
- Published: 1931
- Released: January 13, 1932
- Recorded: December 28, 1931
- Studio: Studio 1, New York City
- Genre: Traditional pop
- Label: Victor
- Composer: Nacio Herb Brown
- Lyricist: Gordon Clifford

"Paradise" is a 1931 song with music by Nacio Herb Brown and lyrics by Gordon Clifford. It was first sung by Pola Negri in RKO Pictures' 1932 film A Woman Commands, and has since been heard in many other films, including a memorable performance by Gloria Grahame (dubbed by Kaye Lorraine), in the 1949 Nicholas Ray film A Woman's Secret.

The song was recorded by many artists in 1932 and there were popular versions by Guy Lombardo, Leo Reisman, Bing Crosby (recorded on March 15, 1932) and Russ Columbo.

== Other recordings ==
- Dorothy Lamour (1939)
- Frank Sinatra (1945)
- Helen Forrest (1950)
- Eddie Fisher (1952)
- Bing Crosby re-recorded the song for his 1954 album Bing: A Musical Autobiography
- Sylvia Syms (1954)
- Patti Page (1955)
- Jerry Vale (1958) - for his I Remember Russ album
- Nat King Cole (1958) - for his album The Very Thought of You
- Vic Damone
- Sammy Turner (1960)
- Lena Horne (1962) - for her album Lena on the Blue Side
- Ann-Margret for her 1963 album Bachelors' Paradise
- Frank Ifield (1965)
- Dinah Shore - for her 1976 album For the Good Times
