= Rosita (film) =

1923 film directed by Ernst Lubitsch

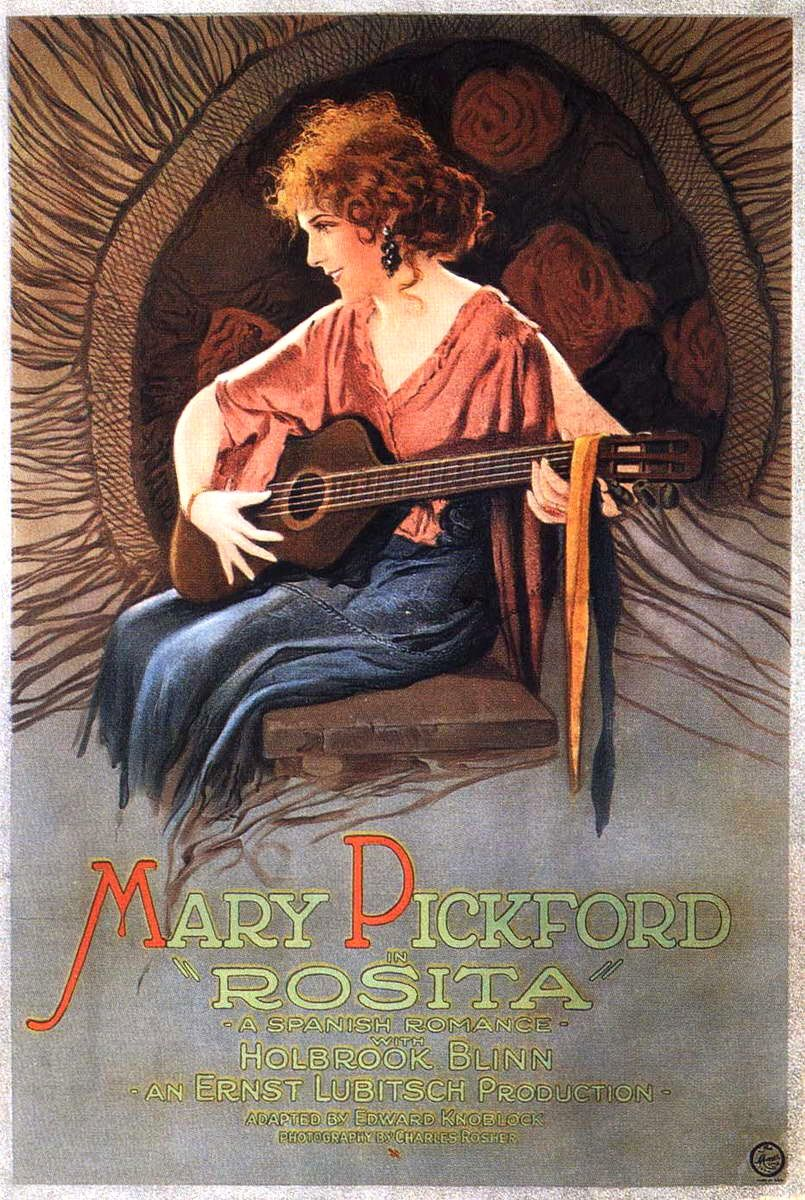
- Theatrical poster
- Directed by: Ernst Lubitsch; Raoul Walsh (uncredited)
- Written by: Edward Knoblock; Hanns Kräly; Norbert Falk
- Based on: Don César de Bazan; 1844 novel by Philippe François Pinel
- Produced by: Mary Pickford
- Starring: Mary Pickford
- Cinematography: Charles Rosher
- Music by: Louis F. Gottschalk
- Distributed by: United Artists
- Release date: September 3, 1923
- Running time: 90 minutes
- Country: United States
- Language: Silent (English intertitles)
- Box office: $900,000

Rosita is a 1923 silent American historical comedy drama film directed by Ernst Lubitsch and starring Mary Pickford. The film is based upon an 1872 opera Don César de Bazan by Adolphe d'Ennery and Philippe Dumanoir.

== Plot ==
In Seville, the King of Spain is shocked by the depths of depravity and sin his people have sunk to. He decides to visit the town when a carnaval is organized in order to redeem it. One of its inhabitants is Rosita, a beloved street singer praised by the townspeople for her talent.

Rosita is the only source of income for her poor family, who are always fighting each other. She is fed up with living in extreme poverty, while the king is living in wealth. After being forced to pay taxes, Rosita is enraged and comes up with a song in which she insults the king. Soon, the king is informed of the offensive ballad and visits her anonymously. Instead of being angry, he is charmed by the woman. However, the soldiers come to arrest her for publicly insulting the king.

While being taken to prison, Don Diego tries to defend her. Instead of persuading the soldiers to set her free, however, he is arrested as well. They fall in love at the police station, but she is unaware Diego is a powerful captain. By the king's request, Rosita is set free and escorted to his castle. Diego, however, is told he will be hung. When she meets him, Rosita does not believe he is the king. He tries to seduce her, but she is not impressed until he offers her fashionable clothes. She does not want to have anything to do with him, but is pressured into giving in to his advances by her family, who see an opportunity at becoming wealthy.

Living a luxurious life in the castle, the family still feels disrespected. Rosita's mother demands a noble husband for her daughter, and the king offers Diego. Rosita's mother is pleased, not knowing he will be executed shortly after the wedding. Diego is manipulated into participating by the offer of being shot like an honorable soldier, rather than hanged. At the wedding, they are married with their eyes covered, thus not knowing who they are marrying. The king's plan fails when Rosita breaks the rules and looks at her future husband.

Rosita is shocked to learn her new husband is Diego, who is sent back to jail immediately. Rosita convinces the king to set Diego free. However, when she leaves, the king again orders the guards to kill Diego. Meanwhile, the queen has found out about his new fling and is furious.

Soon afterward, Rosita is informed that Diego has been executed. Devastated, she attempts to kill the king. They find out Diego is still alive, and the lovers are reunited. The king is confronted by his wife about his affair. She reveals she ordered the guards to spare Diego.

== Cast ==
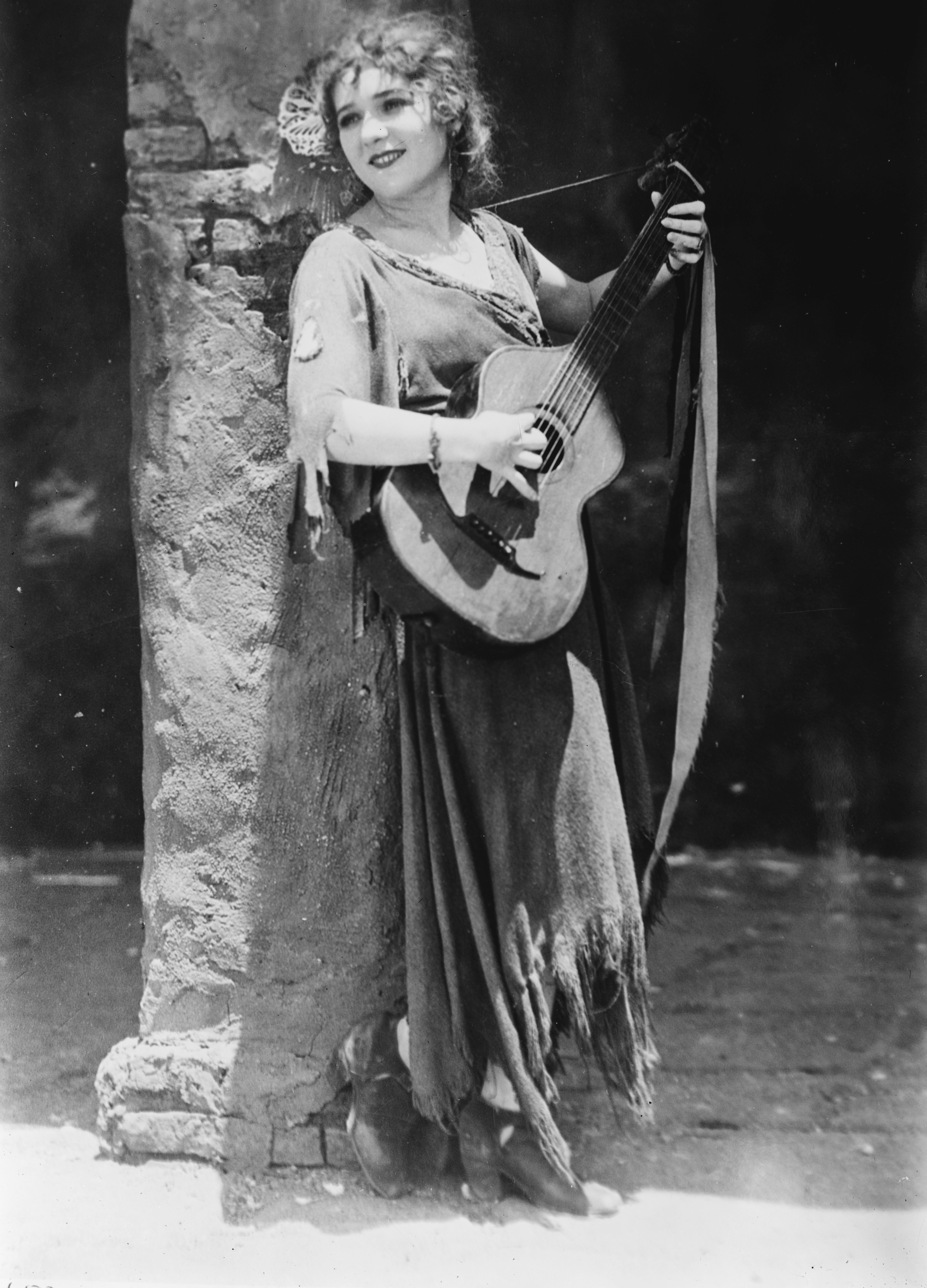
Pickford as Rosita

- Mary Pickford as Rosita
- Holbrook Blinn as the king
- Irene Rich as the queen
- George Walsh as Don Diego
- Charles Belcher as the prime minister
- Frank Leigh as prison commandant
- Mathilde Comont as Rosita's mother
- George Periolat as Rosita's father
- Bert Sprotte as big jailer
- Snitz Edwards as little jailer
- Madame De Bodamere as maid
- Philippe De Lacy as Rosita's brother
- Donald McAlpin as Rosita's brother
- Doreen Turner as Rosita's sister
- Mario Carillo as majordomo
- Charles Farrell in uncredited bit role
- Wilna Hervey bit role

== Production ==
Before this movie, Mary Pickford mostly appeared in features portraying children. Pickford appealed to a fan magazine for new film ideas, and the magazine's contributors wrote back that they wanted to see her play more child roles, such as Cinderella. Pickford thanked them and promptly set out to make a film with an adult role.

In 1922, her studio United Artists was not making any profits despite releasing successful films such as Broken Blossoms, Little Lord Fauntleroy (1921) and Robin Hood (1922). Pickford was desperate to release a film that could perform well and free her of her image as an ingenue.

Realizing Hollywood was making profits with costume movies such as When Knighthood Was in Flower, she decided to make a film based on the 1902 novel Dorothy Vernon of Haddon Hall. She chose Ernst Lubitsch as her director and brought him from Germany in October 1922 to meet with her.

Lubitsch decided he could not make Dorothy Vernon of Haddon Hall. Pickford was annoyed because she had spent $250,000 on its preparations (and eventually filmed the story later). They looked for another story to make a movie, ultimately choosing Faust. However, the project was dropped when Pickford's mother, Charlotte Hennessy, overheard Lubitsch discussing the baby killing scene and immediately nixed the idea. Lubitsch and Pickford eventually decided to film the opera Don César de Bazan, retitling it Rosita. Lubitsch hesitated about making it, but Pickford persuaded him to work on the project.

Pickford wanted Ramon Novarro to co-star opposite her as Don Diego. Rex Ingram, Navarro's mentor, protested this offer by reminding Novarro that Pickford once stated that Novarro's "face and body do not match." Novarro followed Ingram's advice and rejected the role.

Lubitsch later said working with Pickford was a delight. Pickford also enjoyed working with Lubitsch, and at first contracted him to make three more movies with her.

== Release ==
The film was successful upon its release, earning over $1 million.

== Preservation ==
For reasons unknown, Pickford decided the film was a failure. While she carefully preserved most of her filmography, she allowed Rosita to decay, save for the film's fourth reel, and no prints of the film were thought to exist. However, in the 1960s a nitrate print was discovered in the Russian film archives and repatriated by the Museum of Modern Art. A safety preservation negative was made from the nitrate print, but no further work was done on the film. Starting in 2016, work restoring the film began as recent breakthroughs in digital restoration made it possible to reclaim many of the film's severely damaged images. In 2017, the restoration of the film held its world premiere at the 74th Venice International Film Festival.

== See also ==
- Don César de Bazan
- The Spanish Dancer (1923)
