= A Woman Commands =

1932 film

- Theatrical poster of the film
- Directed by: Paul L. Stein; E. J. Babille (assistant)
- Screenplay by: Horace Jackson
- Story by: Thilde Forster
- Produced by: Charles R. Rogers; Harry Joe Brown (associate)
- Starring: Pola Negri; Roland Young; Basil Rathbone
- Cinematography: Hal Mohr; Arthur C. Miller (additional footage)
- Edited by: Daniel Mandell; George Hively
- Music by: Arthur Lange; Nacio Herb Brown
- Production company: RKO Radio Pictures
- Distributed by: RKO Radio Pictures
- Release date: January 1, 1932 (US)
- Running time: 84 minutes
- Country: United States
- Language: English
- Budget: $415,000
- Box office: $212,000

A Woman Commands is a 1932 American pre-Code drama film directed by Paul L. Stein and starring Pola Negri, Roland Young, and Basil Rathbone. Some additional scenes were directed by an uncredited Harry Joe Brown.

The film was novelized in 1931 by Guy Fowler. (Note: See renewal R238242 for proof of novelization.) The film's copyright was renewed in 1959. (Note: Under R242081)

== Plot ==
The film follows the passionate romance between Madame Maria Draga, a glamorous cabaret singer with expensive tastes, and Captain Alex Pastitsch, an officer in the royal guard. Deeply in love with Maria, Alex struggles to fund her luxurious lifestyle and resorts to gambling to pay for her jewels and fine gifts. His mounting financial desperation eventually leads him into severe debt, drawing the attention of military superiors who arrange for his sudden professional transfer to a remote post to salvage his career and reputation. Before he leaves, Maria spends a final night with him, and recognizing that his refusal to accept the transfer would ruin him, she persuades him to go for his own good.

Shortly after Alex's departure, the reigning monarch, King Alexander, visits the cabaret and becomes instantly captivated by Maria's beauty and singing performance. He sends a lieutenant to invite her to a private royal party. Initially reluctant, Maria agrees to attend only after extracting information about Alex's whereabouts from the royal messenger. At the palace, the King makes aggressive advances and attempts to seduce her. Despite the King's persistent pursuit, Maria resists his charms. However, through a complex mix of royal pressure, political maneuvering, and her altered circumstances, she ultimately agrees to marry him, ascending the throne as Queen.

The marriage provokes immediate outrage among the King's ministers and the traditional aristocracy, who view a former cabaret entertainer as a threat to the dignity of the royal dynasty. Tensions spill over during a formal military parade held in honor of the new Queen. Having returned from his remote post, Captain Alex—still bitter and heartbroken—joins his fellow soldiers in a public display of insubordination by refusing to salute or even look at Maria. Outraged by this blatant disrespect, the authorities arrest Alex, and he is sentenced to indefinite imprisonment. Unwilling to see her former lover languish behind bars, Maria uses her influence over the King to secure Alex's pardon and release.

Time passes, and Maria gives birth to a royal heir, Prince Milan. Despite the birth of an heir, public discontent with the monarchy continues to grow rapidly across the country. Displeasure with the King's rule and the scandalous royal marriage fuels a massive underground revolutionary movement. Agitators, secretly stirred up by factions including the resentful Alex, rally the populace against the crown.

Eventually, a full-scale revolution erupts. The government collapses, angry crowds and rebel soldiers storm the palace, and King Alexander is assassinated amidst the chaos. In the aftermath of the uprising, the victorious revolutionary leaders demand that Maria completely abdicate her rights and sign official documents declaring her young son illegitimate, thereby stripping the child of any royal lineage. Maria firmly relinquishes her right to the throne, but she fiercely refuses to sign away her son's legitimacy.

Alex, witnessing the destruction and realizing the genuine strength of her character, steps in to support her against the extremists. With the violent turmoil settling, Maria and Alex are finally reunited, escaping the chaos as they flee the country together.

== Cast ==
- Pola Negri as Madame Maria Draga/Queen Draga of Serbia
- Roland Young as King Alexander
- Basil Rathbone as Captain Alex Pastitsch
- H. B. Warner as Colonel Stradimirovitsch
- Anthony Bushell as Lt. Iwan Petrovitch
- Reginald Owen as The Prime Minister
- May Boley as Mascha
- Frank Reicher as The General
- George Baxter as Chedo
- David Newell as Adutant
- Allan Cavan as Minor Role (uncredited)
- Carl Stockdale as Priest (uncredited)

== Reception ==
=== Critical ===
Mordaunt Hall of the The New York Times wrote that although the film "is no masterpiece, it has several good episodes.The denouement is very tame, but there is always the acting of Roland Young, Basil Rathbone and H. B. Warner, besides Miss Negri."

Variety wrote that the "heavy advance ballyhoo" that preceded the film's release would help make it a success, but it described the flow of the storyline as "awkward" and "confusing" and the transition from comedy to drama as "an assault on plausibility." Negri was noted for demonstrating a "rather agreeable contralto" in her singing scenes, Basil Rathbone was described as acting with "unusual inflexibility" and "acting honors" went to Roland Young.

The Film Daily wrote that the film began in a comedy vein before switching to drama but that it "fails to sustain interest." Negri was well received, and was described as "glamorous and expert in a part which does not afford her the best opportunities."

=== Commercial ===
According to RKO records, the film made a loss of $265,000.

== Songs ==
- Paradise - music by Nacio Herb Brown; words by Gordon Clifford
- Promise You'll Remember Me For I'll Remember You - music by Nacio Herb Brown; words by Nacio Herb Brown & Charles Whittaker (Note: See R229234 for proof of this song's inclusion)
