= Confession (1937 film) =

1937 film directed by Joe May

- 1937 US Theatrical Poster
- Directed by: Joe May
- Written by: Julius J. Epstein (English adaptation); Margaret P. Levino (English adaptation)
- Based on: Mazurka; 1935 film by Hans Rameau
- Produced by: Hal B. Wallis (uncredited exec. producer); Jack L. Warner (uncredited exec. producer)
- Starring: Kay Francis; Ian Hunter; Basil Rathbone; Jane Bryan
- Cinematography: Sidney Hickox
- Edited by: James Gibbon
- Music by: Peter Kreuder (musical score and songs)
- Production company: Warner Bros. Pictures
- Distributed by: Warner Bros. Pictures
- Release date: August 19, 1937
- Running time: 87 minutes
- Country: United States
- Language: English
- Budget: $500,000 (est.)

Confession is a 1937 American drama film directed by Joe May and starring Kay Francis, Ian Hunter, Basil Rathbone and Jane Bryan. It was a scene-for-scene remake of the 1935 German film Mazurka starring Pola Negri, which Warner Bros. Pictures acquired the American distribution rights for and then shelved in favor of the remake. With an estimated $513,000 budget, it started production in March 1937 and was released August 19, 1937, in New York City.

== Plot ==
"In a European city in the year 1930," 17-year-old music student Lisa Koslov (Bryan) sees her mother off at the train station, and as she is leaving, is handed an envelope containing two tickets to a piano concert she suspects come from a well-dressed man she thinks may be stalking her. Her friend Hildegard persuades her to attend the concert and realizes the man is the pianist himself, the renowned Michael Michailow (Rathbone). On Lisa's behalf, Hildegard accepts Michailow's dinner invitation to Lisa when she has misgivings. There he suavely pleads his loneliness and begs to see her the next day. When she goes to her conservatory lessons instead, she discovers that he has lied to the professor to insinuate himself as her tutor. Michailow kisses Lisa, who despite awareness that the situation is unsavory, responds to the kiss.

The third day, when her mother returns, Michailow calls Lisa at home and persuades her to sneak out. He takes her to a seamy cabaret to continue his patient seduction where he won't be recognized. During a suggestive number sung by tawdry chanteuse Vera Kowalska (Francis), the couple are illuminated in a spotlight as Michailow again kisses Lisa. Vera and Michailow recognize one another and she faints from shock. He tries to leave hastily with Lisa, but Vera shoots him dead. At her trial Vera confesses to the murder but refuses to disclose her motive. As the lawyers are making their closing speeches, her newly discovered suitcase is brought as evidence before the presiding judge (Crisp). When he orders it opened to attempt to determine if it contains mitigating evidence, Vera abruptly decides to give a full statement to the court if the suitcase is not opened and the courtroom cleared of all witnesses and spectators.

Vera reveals that in 1912 she was a young diva in Warsaw appearing in an opera composed by Michailow, a womanizer who claimed to be madly in love with her. She left the company to marry soldier Leonide Kirow (Hunter), and three years later was a mother with a husband at war. At her doctor's advice, Vera attended a charity ball, where she was reunited with her old company, including Michailow. He lured her to a party at his apartment, where she became drunk and passed out. The next morning, while pondering how to tell her husband before gossip reached him, he returned from the front as an amputee, and out of a sense of guilt she remained silent. Michailow bombarded her with letters begging to see her, which she hid from Leonide without answering them, until one day she went to Michailow to warn him to stop. Leonide followed her, and thinking the worst, sued her for adultery. Michailow fled to avoid testifying on her behalf, and she was found guilty, losing custody of her daughter.

For fifteen years, reduced to being a cheap singer, Vera searched Europe for Leonide (who had changed his name to Koslov and disappeared) and her child. When she at last located them (the day of the shooting), she learned that Leonide has been dead three years and that he had remarried. Her daughter, who is Lisa, has no idea that the second wife is not her real mother. Vera's suitcase contains papers proving her statement, and she testified to prevent them from being read in open court, to save Lisa's reputation and her relationship with the woman she believes is her mother. When open session resumes, all the parties avoid any mention of the details, and while Vera is found guilty, the court grants her a pardon. After the trial, Lisa approaches Vera to wish her well. Vera has a fantasy of warmly embracing her daughter, but instead calmly thanks her and happily watches her drive away.

== Cast ==
- Kay Francis as Vera
- Ian Hunter as Leonide
- Basil Rathbone as Michael Michailow
- Jane Bryan as Lisa
- Donald Crisp as the Presiding Judge
- Mary Maguire as Hildegard
- Dorothy Peterson as Mrs. Koslov
- Laura Hope Crews as Stella
- Robert Barrat as the Prosecuting Attorney
- Ben Welden as the Defense Attorney
- Veda Ann Borg as Xenia
- Joan Valerie as Wanda (credited as Helen Valkis)

== Critical reception ==
The Film Daily gave a positive review and wrote, "Here is a mother-love story that has been very well acted and directed. Although the story is rather familiar, it has been given clever treatment and by virtue of Joe May's direction holds the interest until the end ... Julius J. Epstein and Margaret LeVino fashioned a gripping screenplay. Kay Francis' work is her best in some time."

Modern Screen’s Leo Townsend commented that although the film was intended as a vehicle for Kay Francis, "it is not the star who contributes the picture’s better moments. Such moments are in the capable hands of Basil Rathbone and Jane Bryan. As the heavy of the piece, Rathbone is at his suave best, and Jane Bryan, as a young musician infatuated by his charm, plays one of the season’s finest ingenue roles." Townsend commented on the excellence of "fine beginning" but felt that with the introduction of Francis’ character, "the drama’s pace slackens and loses the advantage" of the film’s early scenes.

Photoplay wrote, "Even Kay Francis found it difficult to sustain the somber burden of this little number. It's a heavy, moody melodrama based on the Madame X theme."

In their positive review, Variety also stated that the film followed the Madame X formula, however the reviewer consider it to be an advantage, and commented that as a "finely produced vehicle for Kay Francis", it provided her an opportunity to expand into more dramatic roles. The reviewer expressed the opinion that the timing of the film's release, during "the present season's abundance of comedies", offered audiences an alternative that may contribute to the film's success at the box office.
