= Mazurka (film) =

1935 film

- Directed by: Willi Forst
- Written by: Willi Forst; Hans Rameau
- Produced by: Arnold Pressburger; Gregor Rabinovitch
- Starring: Pola Negri; Albrecht Schoenhals; Ingeborg Theek
- Cinematography: Konstantin Irmen-Tschet
- Edited by: Hans Wolff
- Music by: Peter Kreuder
- Production company: Cine-Allianz
- Distributed by: Rota-Film
- Release date: 14 November 1935
- Running time: 91 minutes
- Country: Germany
- Language: German

Mazurka is a 1935 German drama film directed by Willi Forst and starring Pola Negri, Albrecht Schoenhals, and Ingeborg Theek. A woman is put on trial for murdering a predatory musician. It takes its name from the Mazurka, a Polish folk dance.

Warner Brothers Studios acquired the U.S. distribution rights but shelved the film in favor of its own scene-by-scene 1937 English language remake, Confession, which starred Kay Francis. Mazurka's sets were designed by the art director Hermann Warm. It was partly shot on location in Warsaw. The film was made by Cine-Allianz whose Jewish owners Arnold Pressburger and Gregor Rabinovitch were dispossessed during pre-production of the film.

== Cast ==
- Pola Negri as Vera, a singer
- Albrecht Schoenhals as Grigorij Michailow
- Ingeborg Theek as Lisa
- Franziska Kinz as Mother
- Paul Hartmann as Boris Kierow
- Hans Hermann Schaufuss as Defense lawyer
- Inge List as Hilde
- Friedrich Kayßler as Judge
- Georg Georgi
- Antonie Jaeckel

== Reception ==
Writing for The Spectator in 1937, Graham Greene gave the film a reserved middling review, praising the first twenty minutes as "admirable", but expressed his view that Pola Negri's performance for the remainder of the film was "deliberately [...] guy[ed]" by director Forst. Greene complained that "Negri may be unwise to return to the films, but it is a cruel idea of fun to guy [her] for the pleasure of audiences who have forgotten [her]". Unusually for Greene, he also provided a second opinion from Sydney Carroll's The Sunday Times review which lavished praise on Negri's performance and advised "every pert little miss who fancies herself an embryo star" to pay close attention to the authentic vividness Negri brought to the role.

== Bibliography ==
- Kotowski, Mariusz (2014). Pola Negri: Hollywood's First Femme Fatale. University Press of Kentucky. ISBN 978-0-8131-4489-4.
