= The Spanish Dancer =

1923 film by Herbert Brenon

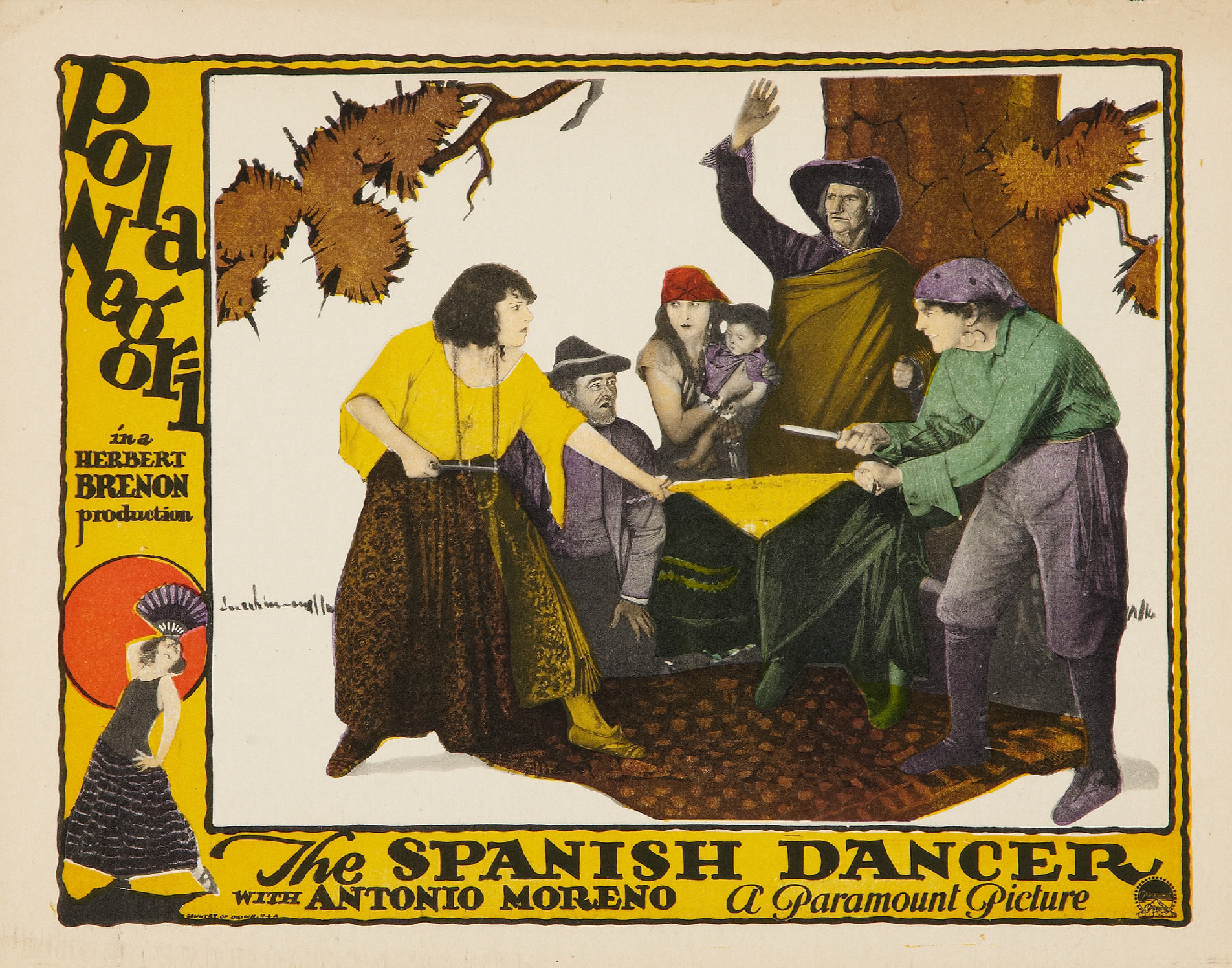
- Lobby card
- Directed by: Herbert Brenon
- Written by: Adolphe Philippe d'Ennery (novel Don Cesar de Bazan); Dumanoir (Philippe Francois Pinel) (novel Don Cesar de Bazan); Adolphe d'Ennery and Philippe François Pinel (play Don César de Bazan); June Mathis (treatment, scenario); Beulah Marie Dix (treatment, scenario)
- Starring: Pola Negri; Antonio Moreno; Wallace Beery; Kathlyn Williams; Gareth Hughes; Adolphe Menjou; Anne Shirley
- Cinematography: James Wong Howe
- Edited by: Helene Warne
- Production company: Famous Players–Lasky
- Distributed by: Paramount Pictures
- Release date: November 4, 1923
- Running time: 9 reels at 8,434 feet (approx. 90-100 minutes)
- Country: United States
- Language: Silent (English intertitles)

The Spanish Dancer is a 1923 American silent costume epic starring Pola Negri as a gypsy fortune teller, Antonio Moreno as a romantic count, and Wallace Beery as the king of Spain. The film was directed by Herbert Brenon and also features a five-year-old Anne Shirley, appearing under the name "Dawn O'Day." The film survives today.

The film is essentially the same story as Mary Pickford's Rosita which was filmed around the same time as The Spanish Dancer with Negri's old colleague from Germany Ernst Lubitsch directing. Negri's The Spanish Dancer was considered the better film.

The Spanish Dancer

== Plot ==
As described in a film magazine review, Maritana, a beautiful Spanish young woman, is so full of life and fun that she is adored by the poor people among whom she lives and who dote on her dancing in the public squares. Through her daring, she and her sweetheart Don Cesar de Bazan become involved in the affairs of the Spanish court, and he with his life is to pay the supreme penalty. Using her feminine charms and her artful wiles, she not only saves him but wins a respected place for herself.

== Cast ==
- Pola Negri as Maritana, Gypsy fortune teller
- Antonio Moreno as Don Cesar de Bazan
- Wallace Beery as King Philip IV
- Kathlyn Williams as Queen Isabel of Bourbon
- Gareth Hughes as Lazarillo
- Adolphe Menjou as Don Salluste
- Edward Kipling as Marquis de Rotundo
- Henry Vogel as Olivares
- Anne Shirley as Don Balthazar Carlos (credited as Dawn O'Day)
- Charles A. Stevenson as Cardinal's Ambassador
- Robert Agnew as Juan
- Buck Black (uncredited)
- Frank Coghlan Jr. (uncredited)
- Gino Corrado as Musketeer (uncredited)
- George J. Lewis (uncredited)
- Virginia Bethel Moon as Grandmother (uncredited)

== Production ==
Exteriors for The Spanish Dancer were taken on location at Busch Gardens in Pasedena, California, the estate of Adolphus Busch, which was open to the public from 1906 to 1937.

== Preservation ==
The Spanish Dancer was restored by the EYE Film Institute in the Netherlands, and the film was shown at the National Gallery of Art in Washington, D.C., on August 5, 2012, accompanied by the 1916 Lois Weber film Shoes.
