= The Crown of Lies =

1926 film by Dimitri Buchowetzki

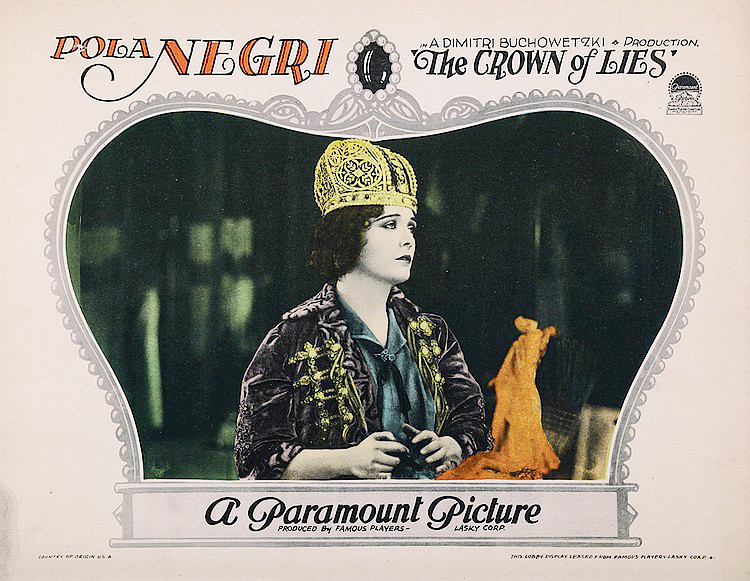
- Lobby card
- Directed by: Dimitri Buchowetzki
- Written by: Ernest Vajda (story); Hope Loring (co-writer); Louis D. Lighton (co-writer)
- Produced by: Adolph Zukor; Jesse L. Lasky
- Starring: Pola Negri
- Cinematography: Bert Glennon
- Distributed by: Paramount Pictures
- Release date: March 27, 1926
- Running time: 50 minutes
- Country: United States
- Language: Silent (English intertitles)

The Crown of Lies is a 1926 American silent romantic drama film directed by Dimitri Buchowetzki and starring Pola Negri. It was produced and financed by Famous Players–Lasky and distributed by Paramount Pictures.

== Plot ==
As described in a film magazine review, Olga Kriga, a New York boarding house maid, is loved by John Knight, an automobile salesman, asks her to wed him. One day in a delicatessen, she is seen by a foreigner, who immediately hails her as "Queen." He tells her the faithful cabinet is waiting nearby. The foreigner is a servant of the former prime minister and he insists that she is the long lost ruler of Sylvania, a small European country. Olga decides to pose as that lost queen of Sylvania, and travels to that Balkan country accompanied by Knight. Count Mirko, knowing her return will cause usurper troubles, plans to make it appear beneficial to be rid of Olga. However, the people of the country acclaim her as queen and, after a revolt, put her on the throne. Happiness has been restored to Sylvania, but Olga decides that she no longer to pose as a royal and returns to New York with Knight.

== Cast ==
- Pola Negri as Olga Kriga
- Noah Beery as Count Mirko
- Robert Ames as John Knight
- Charles A. Post as Karl
- Arthur Hoyt as Fritz
- Michael Vavitch as Vorski
- Cissy Fitzgerald as Leading Lady
- May Foster as Landlady
- Frankie Bailey as Actress
- Edward Cecil as Leading Man
- Erwin Connelly as Stage Manager

== Production ==
The Crown of Lies was partially shot on location at Truckee, California.

== Preservation ==
With no prints of The Crown of Lies located in any film archives, it is a lost film.
