= Dumanoir =

French playwright and librettist

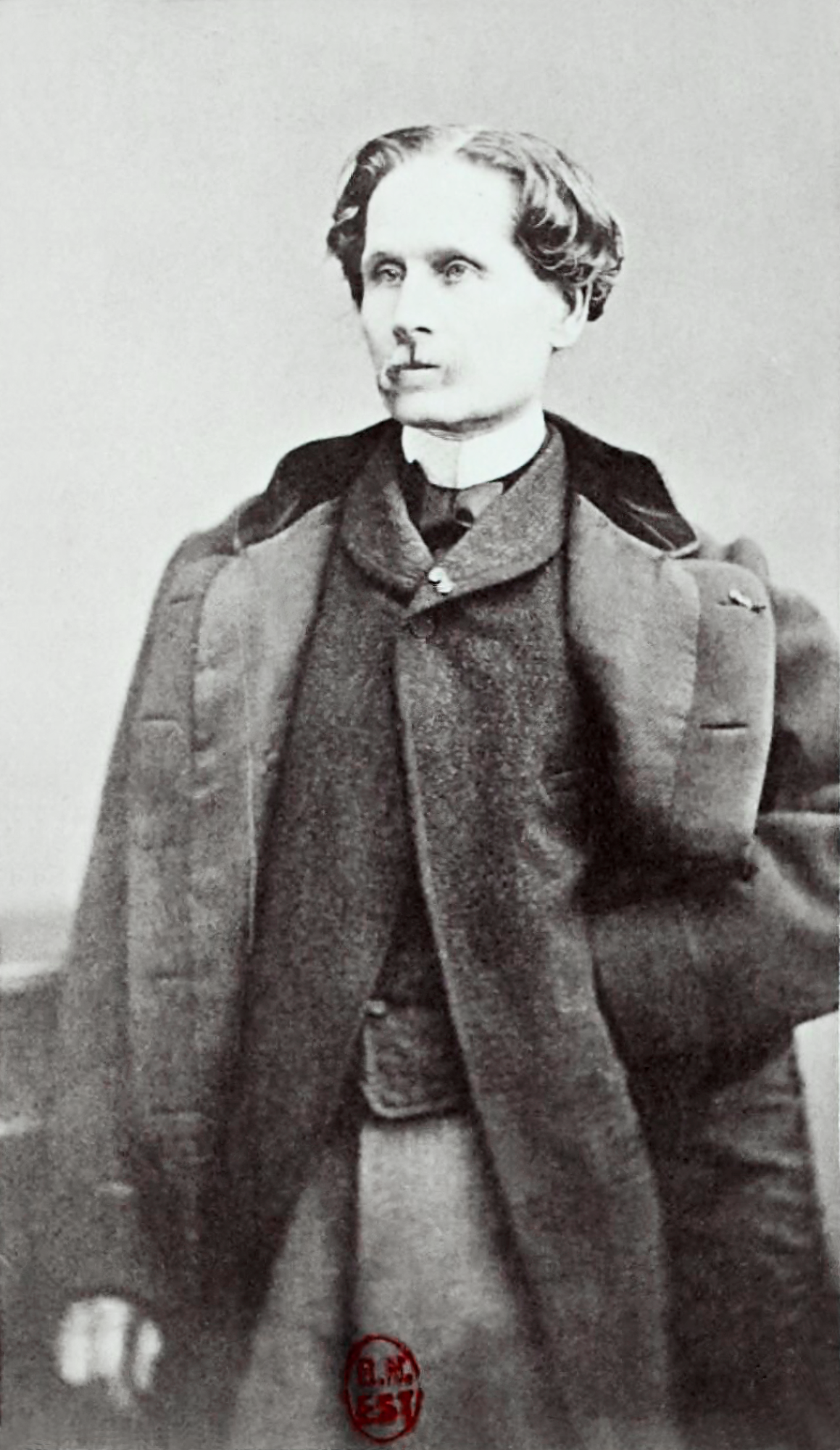
- Engraving of Dumanoir 1839
- Born: Philippe François Pinel Dumanoir; 22 October 1806; Capesterre-Belle-Eau
- Died: 13 November 1865 place Gramont
- Occupations: Playwright, librettist, writer
- Awards: Chevalier of the Legion of Honour (1847); Officer of the Legion of Honor (1865)

Philippe François Pinel (French pronunciation: [filip fʁɑ̃swa pinɛl]), known as Dumanoir ([dymanwaʁ]; 31 July 1806 – 16 November 1865), was a French playwright and librettist.

== Biography ==
Dumanoir was born in Capesterre-Belle-Eau, Guadeloupe. He was the son of Mrs. Pinel-Dumanoir, whose family planted the palm trees lining the Allée Dumanoir in Guadeloupe. He left Guadeloupe in 1816. Dumanoir wrote in the theatrical genre of Comédie en vaudevilles. He was director of the Théâtre des Variétés from 1837 to 1839. In 1844, he wrote in collaboration with Adolphe d'Ennery, an eponymous drama about Don César de Bazan, one of the characters in Ruy Blas by Victor Hugo.

He died in Pau.

== List of major works ==
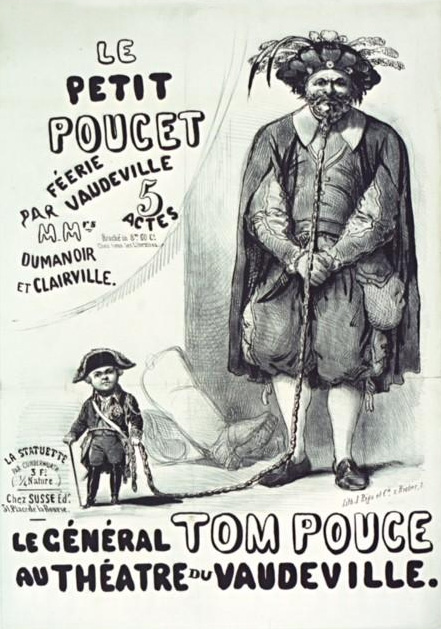
Le Petit Poucet by M M Dumanoir and Clairvile; Le général Tom Pouce au Théatre du Vaudeville.

=== Plays ===
- 1842: Le Chevalier d'Éon, comedy in 3 acts, (with Jean-François Bayard), Théâtre des Variétés
- 1839: Les Premières Armes de Richelieu (with Jean-François Bayard), Théâtre du Palais Royal
- 1840: Indiana et Charlemagne (with Jean-François Bayard), Théâtre du Palais Royal
- 1842: Ma maîtresse et ma femme, comédie-vaudeville in 1 act, (with Adolphe d'Ennery), Théâtre des Variétés
- 1843: Les Hures-Graves (with Clairville and Paul Siraudin), Théâtre du Palais Royal
- 1844: Don César de Bazan (with Adolphe d'Ennery), Théâtre de la Porte Saint-Martin
- 1845: Le Code des femmes, Théâtre du Palais Royal
- 1846: Gentil-Bernard ou L'Art d'aimer (with Clairville), Théâtre des Variétés
- 1849: Exposition des produits de la République, comédie en vaudevilles in 3 acts (with Eugène Labiche and Clairville), Théâtre du Palais Royal
- 1853: La Case de l'oncle Tom, (with Adolphe d'Ennery), Théâtre de l'Ambigu-Comique
- 1857: Les Bourgeois gentilshommes, comedy in 3 acts, in prose, Théâtre du Gymnase
- 1862: Les Invalides du mariage, comedy in 3 acts (with Lafargue), Théâtre du Gymnase

=== Opera and ballet ===
- 1840: La Perruche, opéra-comique in 1 act (with Louis Clapisson and Henri Dupin)
- 1840: Grisélidis ballet by Adolphe Adam
- 1845: Maritana, opera by William Vincent Wallace (based on the play Don César de Bazan)
- 1862: La Chatte merveilleuse, opera by Albert Grisar, libretto written with Adolphe d'Ennery (1811-1899)
- 1863: La Mule de Pédro, opera by Victor Massé
- 1872: Don César de Bazan, opera by Jules Massenet (based on the play Don César de Bazan)

== Filmography ==
- Don Caesar de Bazan, directed by Robert G. Vignola (1915, based on the play Don César de Bazan)
- Don Cesar, Count of Irun, directed by Luise Kolm and Jacob Fleck (Austria, 1918, based on the play Don César de Bazan)
- The Adventurer, directed by J. Gordon Edwards (1920, based on the play Don César de Bazan)
- Rosita, directed by Ernst Lubitsch (1923, based on the play Don César de Bazan)
- The Spanish Dancer, directed by Herbert Brenon (1923, based on the play Don César de Bazan)
- Don Cesare di Bazan, directed by Riccardo Freda (Italy, 1942, based on the play Don César de Bazan)
- The Seventh Sword, directed by Riccardo Freda (Italy, 1962, based on the play Don César de Bazan)

== Decorations ==
- – Officer of the Legion of Honour France 14 August 1965

== Sources ==
- American-Cyclopaedia-Pinel
- Brown University Library – Dumanoir
