= Don César de Bazan =

Opéra comique in four acts by Jules Massenet

- Opéra comique by Jules Massenet
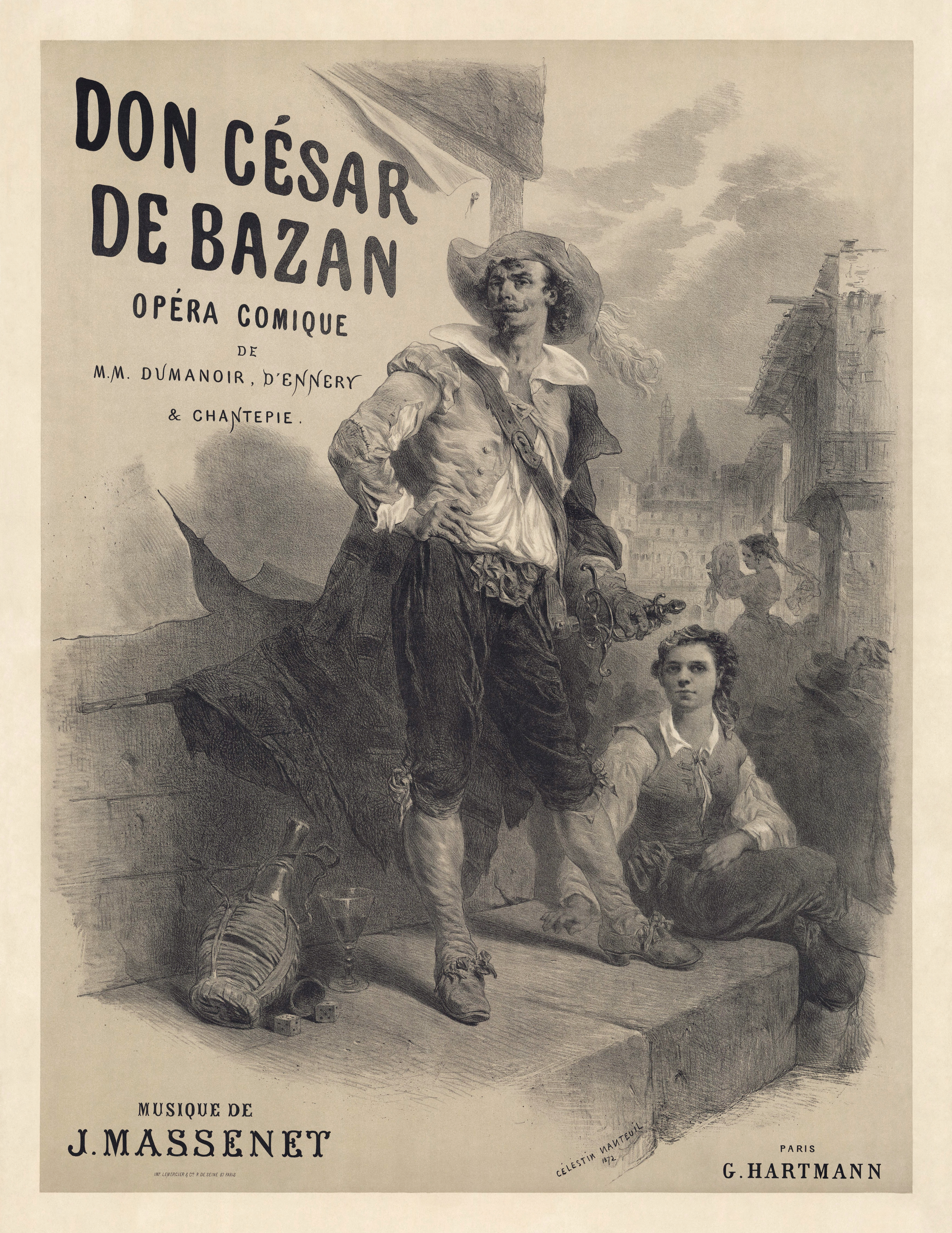
- Poster by Célestin Nanteuil for the première
- Librettist: Adolphe d'Ennery; Philippe-François Pinel "Dumanoir"; Jules Chantepie
- Language: French
- Based on: Ruy Blas by Victor Hugo
- Premiere: 30 November 1872; Opéra-Comique, Paris

Don César de Bazan is an opéra comique in four acts by Jules Massenet to a French libretto by Adolphe d'Ennery, Philippe-François Pinel "Dumanoir" and Jules Chantepie, based on the play by d'Ennery and Dumanoir, which was first performed at Théâtre de la Porte Saint-Martin in 1844. This in turn drew on the popular character of Don César de Bazan, in the 1838 drama Ruy Blas by Victor Hugo, though it has little connection with the plot of Hugo's drama. Massenet's opera was first performed at the Opéra-Comique in Paris on 30 November 1872.

It was the first full-length opera by Massenet to be produced, the one-act La grand'tante having been mounted five years earlier by the same company. Don César de Bazan was not a success and it would be another five years, with the premiere of Le roi de Lahore in 1877, before Massenet rose to his place among the most prominent composers of his time.

Don César de Bazan was initially performed 13 times at the Opéra-Comique. After the fire at the Salle Favart when the parts were lost, Massenet constructed a new version from the vocal score, and this was performed in Geneva in 1888, then Antwerp, Brussels, the French provinces and the Gaîté-Lyrique in 1912, and the Hague in 1925. The orchestral Entr'acte to Act 3, entitled "Sévillana", was in 1895 adapted as a showpiece for solo coloratura soprano, to words specially written by Jules Ruelle ("À Séville, Belles Señoras"). Though this song is still regularly performed, it does not form part of the operatic score.

In 1901, two different plays based on Don César were staged in London. Gerald du Maurier adapted the story with simplified dialogue as A Royal Rival, which was produced by William Faversham. Victor Mapes expanded the plot and added more natural-sounding dialogue in his version, titled Don Caesar's Return, which starred James K. Hackett.

A modern revival took place in several French cities in 2016, when the Frivolités Parisiennes staged a new production including an appearance at the Théâtre de la Porte Saint-Martin, conducted by Mathieu Romano.

== Roles ==
Role	Voice type	Premiere Cast, 30 November 1872 (Conductor: Adolphe Deloffre)
Maritana	soprano	Marguérite Priola
Lazarille, a boy	mezzo-soprano	Célestine Galli-Marié
Charles II of Spain	tenor	Paul Lhérie
Don César de Bazan	baritone	Jacques Bouhy
Don José de Santarém	baritone	Neveu
Captain of the guard	bass	François Bernard
Men and Women folk, Soldiers, Harquebusiers, Ladies and Gentlemen of the Court

== Synopsis ==
=== Act 1 ===
King Charles II of Spain is enamoured of Maritana, a street singer, whom he cannot approach because of her gypsy birth and low station. His chief minister Don José de Santarém promises to help his master win her love. Don César, Count de Bazan, a poor but witty and good-hearted Spanish grandee, fights a duel to save the boy Lazarille from imprisonment by a cruel army captain. Since a royal edict forbids duelling during Holy Week, Don César is arrested and condemned to death by hanging.

=== Act 2 ===
In his prison cell, Don César is visited by Don José. The latter is in love with the Queen, who in turn refuses his love unless the king is proved to have been unfaithful to her. Don José plots to have Maritana marry the condemned man before his execution, thus making her Countess de Bazan, and thus the potential mistress of the King. Without explaining his plan, he promises Maritana riches, while his friend Don César will gain commutation to death by firing squad (instead of a common hanging) and protection for the boy Lazarille. The marriage takes place and then, after Lazarille vows to save his master, the execution is carried out.

=== Act 3 ===
The "widowed" Maritana is now living at the San Fernando palace to be taught courtly manners, being assured by Don José that her husband will soon return from exile. The King comes to visit her, claiming to be Don César - but Maritana says she cannot love him. Before Charles II can force his attentions on her, the real Don César comes in, for Lazarille had cunningly removed the shot from the execution squad's muskets. Don César has already discovered Don José's plot, and finding the traitor in the Queen's private apartments he has killed him, in order to save the honour of the Royal couple. He is appointed Governor of Granada (a long way from Madrid, to ensure Maritana's honour) by the King, and all look forward to the hero's happy life with his beautiful young wife.

== Recording ==
Laurent Naouri, Elsa Dreisig, Marion Lebègue, Christian Helmer, Thomas Bettinger, Ensemble Aedes, and Orchestre des Frivolités Parisiennes, cond. Mathieu Romano. Released June 2020. CD: Naxos Cat:8660464-65.

== See also ==
- Maritana
