= The Beggar Student (disambiguation) =

Der Bettelstudent or The Beggar Student is an operetta in three acts by Carl Millöcker.

The Beggar Student may also refer to:

- The Beggar Student (1927 film)
- The Beggar Student (1931 British film)
- The Beggar Student (1931 German film)
- The Beggar Student (1936 film)
- The Beggar Student (1956 film)
- The Beggar Student (1940 novel)
