= List of operettas and operas by Carl Millöcker =

This is a list of operettas and operas by Carl Millöcker (1842–1899).

Millöcker wrote 20 light operas, of which 16 are described as operettas, one as a Singspiel, one as a 'Volksoper' ('people's opera'). (The other two were left undesignated.) His music is closely associated with the Theater an der Wien in Vienna, where 14 of his works received their first performances.

== List ==
Title	Genre	Subdivisions	Libretto	Première date	Place, theatre
Der tote Gast	operette	1 act	Ludwig Harisch, after the novel by Heinrich Zschokke	11 February 1865	Graz, Thalia-Theater
Die beiden Binder	operette	1 act	G Stoltze	21 December 1865	Graz, Thalia-Theater
Diana	operette	1 act	Josef Braun	2 January 1867	Vienna, Harmonie-Theater
Der Sackpfeifer	operette	1 act	Ludwig Anzengruber	19 September 2015	Strasshof, KUMST
Der Dieb	operette	1 act	Alois Berla	1868/1869	Budapest
Die Fraueninsel	operette	3 acts	after Le royaume des femmes by Théodore and Hippolyte Cogniard	1868/1869	Budapest, Deutsches Theater
Der Regimentstambour	operette	2 acts	Heinrich Börnstein	23 October 1869	Vienna, Theater in der Josefstadt
Abenteuer in Wien	Singspiel	3 acts	Alois Berla	20 January 1873	Vienna, Theater an der Wien
Das verwunschene Schloss	operette	5 acts	Alois Berla	30 March 1878	Vienna, Theater an der Wien
Gräfin Dubarry (revised as Die Dubarry, Berlin 1931)	operette	3 acts	Richard Genée and Friedrich Zell	31 October 1879	Vienna, Theater an der Wien
Apajune, der Wassermann	operette	3 acts	Richard Genée and Friedrich Zell	18 December 1880	Vienna, Theater an der Wien
Die Jungfrau von Belleville	operette	3 acts	Richard Genée and Friedrich Zell, after La pucelle de Belleville by Paul de Kock	29 October 1881	Vienna, Theater an der Wien
Der Bettelstudent	operette	3 acts	Richard Genée and Friedrich Zell, after Fernande by Victorien Sardou, and Le Guitarréro by Halévy / Eugène Scribe	6 December 1882	Vienna, Theater an der Wien
Gasparone	operette	3 acts	Richard Genée and Friedrich Zell	26 January 1884	Vienna, Theater an der Wien
Der Feldprediger		3 acts	Hugo Wittmann and Alois Wohlmuth, after Das seltsame Brautgemach by Gustav Schilling	31 October 1884	Vienna, Theater an der Wien
Der Vice-Admiral	operette	prologue and 3 acts	Richard Genée and Friedrich Zell	9 October 1886	Vienna, Theater an der Wien
Die sieben Schwaben	Volksoper	3 acts	Hugo Wittmann and Julius Bauer	29 October 1887	Vienna, Theater an der Wien
Der arme Jonathan	operette	3 acts	Richard Genée and Friedrich Zell	4 January 1890	Vienna, Theater an der Wien
Das Sonntagskind	operette	3 acts	Richard Genée and Friedrich Zell	16 January 1892	Vienna, Theater an der Wien
Der Probekuss	operette	3 acts	Richard Genée and Friedrich Zell	22 December 1894	Vienna, Theater an der Wien
Das Nordlicht		3 acts	Hugo Wittmann	2 December 1896	Vienna, Theater an der Wien
