= Nanon =

Nanon may refer to:

- Nanon, Ninon et Maintenon, by Emmanuel Théaulon and Armand d'Artois
- Nanon, an 1877 opera by Genee, based on Théaulon and d'Artois
- Nanon (1924 film), a German silent film
- Nanon (1938 film), a German remake film
- Nanon, an 1872 novel by George Sand
- Nanobacterium, the alleged micro-organism
- 559 Nanon, a main-belt asteroid
- Korapat Kirdpan, Thai actor nicknamed Nanon
