= Rita Streich =

German opera soprano (1920–1987)

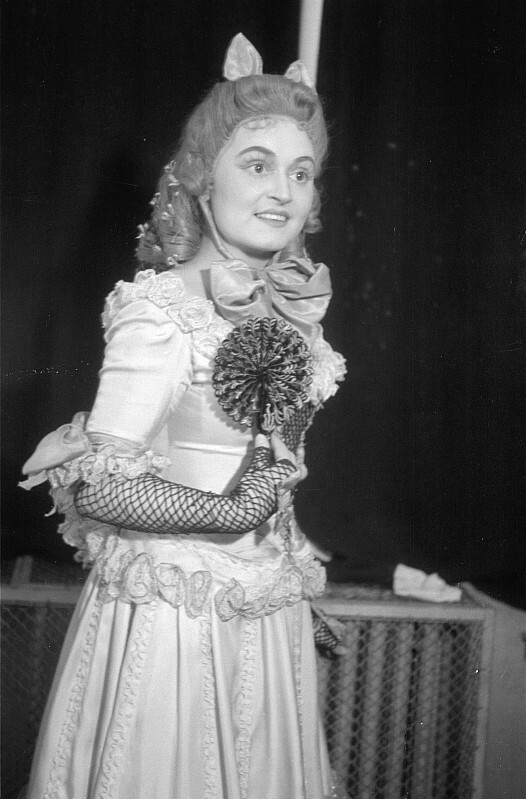
- Rita Streich as Olympia in The Tales of Hoffmann, 1946
- Born: 18 December 1920; Barnaul, Russia SFSR
- Died: 20 March 1987 (aged 66); Vienna, Austria
- Occupation: Operatic soprano
- Years active: 1943–1974

Rita Streich (18 December 1920 – 20 March 1987) was a German opera singer, regarded as one of the most admired and recorded lyric coloratura sopranos of the post-war period.

== Biography ==
Rita Streich was born in Barnaul, southern Siberia, in the Russian Soviet Federative Socialist Republic (RSFSR), to a Russian mother, and a German father who had been a prisoner of war there during World War I. She moved to Germany with her parents during her childhood. She grew up speaking both German and Russian fluently, something that was extremely helpful during her later career. Among her teachers were Willi Domgraf-Fassbaender, Erna Berger and Maria Ivogün.

She made her debut in opera in 1943, at the Stadttheater of Aussig, now Ústí nad Labem in Bohemia, in the role of Zerbinetta in Richard Strauss' opera Ariadne auf Naxos. Three years later she secured her first engagement at the Staatsoper Unter den Linden in Berlin, where she sang until 1952. In that year she moved to Bayreuth, in 1953 to Vienna, and in 1954 to Salzburg. Appearances at La Scala in Milan and at the Covent Garden followed.

It was reported in the 4 October 1963 issue of the Melbourne newspaper The Age that clarinetist Gabor Reeves was to appear with Streich at the Town Hall.

In 1974, she taught at the Folkwang Hochschule in Essen and the Music Academy in Vienna. She gave master classes during the Salzburg Festival in 1983, four years before her death in Vienna.

"Der Hölle Rache kocht in meinem Herzen" (1953)

Her repertoire included roles in Idomeneo, Così fan tutte, Die Entführung aus dem Serail, The Magic Flute, The Marriage of Figaro, Don Giovanni, Der Rosenkavalier, Ariadne auf Naxos, Siegfried (the Forest Bird) and others. Since she had grown up bilingual, she could also sing Rimsky-Korsakov in the original Russian almost without accent. She was also active in operetta. She made recordings of many classical Viennese operettas, for instance Die Fledermaus, Eine Nacht in Venedig, The Gypsy Baron, Boccaccio, Der Bettelstudent and Der Zarewitsch.

Her recording of Puccini's "O mio babbino caro" with the Deutsche Oper Berlin Orchestra conducted by Reinhard Peters, was heard in the 2007 film Mr. Bean's Holiday with Rowan Atkinson lip-synching.

== Selected filmography ==
- The Merry Wives of Windsor (1950)
- Not Without Gisela (1951)
- The Stronger Woman (1953)

== Bibliography ==
- The Last Prima Donnas, by Lanfranco Rasponi, Alfred A Knopf, 1982. ISBN 0-394-52153-6
