= Richard Genée =

Austrian librettist, playwright and composer (1823–1895)

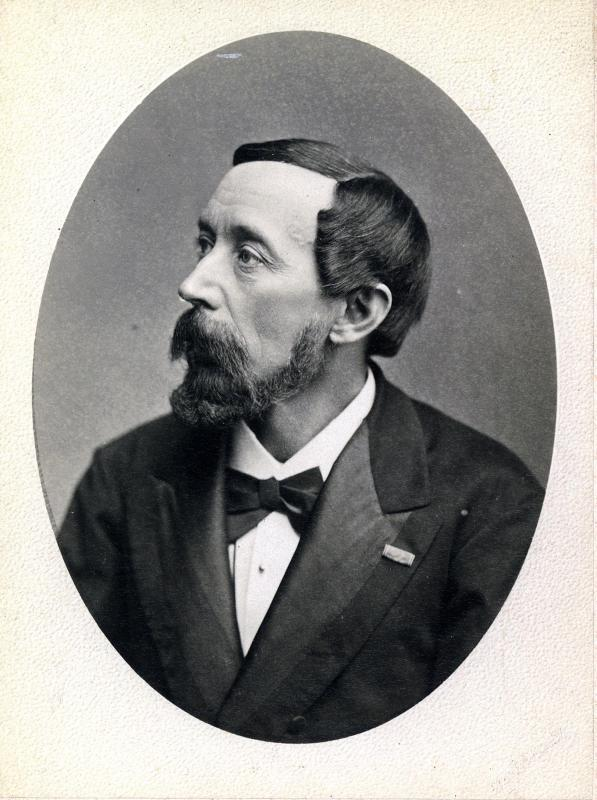
Richard Genée

Franz Friedrich Richard Genée (7 February 1823 – 15 June 1895) was a Prussian-born Austrian librettist, playwright, and composer.

== Life ==
Genée was born in Danzig. He died in Baden bei Wien.

== Works ==
He is most famous for the libretto of Die Fledermaus, Johann Strauss II's most famous operetta. He co-wrote the libretto without having met top-billed librettist Karl Haffner, who constructed the new story based on a play by Henri Meilhac and Ludovic Halévy, which was considered too shocking to perform outside Paris. Genée, however, wrote the operetta's actual text and drew nothing from Haffner beyond the names of the characters. One of his best-known works was the libretto of Carl Millöcker's operetta Der Bettelstudent, which he co-wrote with Friedrich Zell (the pseudonym of Camillo Walzel). He also wrote the libretto to Ella Adayevskaya's 1877 opera Zarya. In 1857, he was conductor of the Philharmonic Orchestra Mainz.

=== Librettos and plays ===
- Polyphen oder Ein Abenteuer auf Martinique (1856)
- Der Geiger aus Tirol (1857)
- Der Liebesring um (1860)
- Ein Trauerspiel (1860)
- Ein Narrentraum (1861)
- Die Generalprobe (1862)
- Die Herren von der Livrée (1862)
- Die Talismänner (1863)
- Rosita (1864)
- Der schwarze Prinz (1866)
- Die Zopfabschneider (1866)
- Am Runenstein (1868)
- Schwefeles, der Höllenagent (1869)
- Eine Konzertprobe (1870)
- Der Hexensabbath (1870)
- Der Sänger mit drei Tönen (1871)
- Der Karneval in Rom (1873), with Josef Braun, operetta in 3 acts (Music: Johann Strauss II)
- Die Fledermaus (1874), with Carl Haffner, operetta in 3 acts (Music: Johann Strauss II)
- Cleopatra oder Durch drei Jahrtausende (1875)
- Cagliostro in Wien (1875), with F. Zell, operetta in 3 acts (Music: Johann Strauss II)
- Fatinitza (1876), with F. Zell, Operetten in 3 acts (Music: Franz von Suppé)
- Der Seekadett (1876), with F. Zell, operetta in 3 acts (Music: Richard Genée)
- Luftschlösser (1876)
- Im Wunderland der Pyramiden (1877)
- Die letzten Mohikaner (1878)
- Die Fornarina (1879), with F. Zell and Moritz West, operetta in 3 acts (Music: Carl Zeller)
- Boccaccio (1879), with F. Zell, operetta in 3 acts (Music: Franz von Suppé)
- Die Dubarry (1879), with F. Zell, operetta in 3 acts (Music: Carl Millöcker)
- Das Spitzentuch der Königin (1880), with Heinrich Bohrmann-Riegen, operetta in 3 acts (Music: Johann Strauss II)
- Apajune, der Wassermann (1880), with F. Zell, operetta in 3 acts (Music: Carl Millöcker)
- Donna Juanita (1880), with F. Zell, operetta in 3 acts (Music: Franz von Suppé)
- Nisida (1880)
- Der Gascogner (1881), with F. Zell, operetta in 3 acts (Music: Franz von Suppé)
- Rosina (1881)
- Der lustige Krieg (1881), with F. Zell, operetta in 3 acts (Music: Johann Strauss II)
- Der Bettelstudent (1882), with F. Zell, operetta in 3 acts (Musik: Carl Millöcker)
- Eine Nacht in Venedig (1883), with F. Zell, operetta in 3 acts (Music: Johann Strauss II)
- Die Afrikareise (1883), with Moritz West, operetta in 3 acts (Music: Franz von Suppé)
- Gasparone (1884), with F. Zell, operetta in 3 acts (Music: Carl Millöcker)
- Eine gemachte Frau (1885)
- Zwillinge (1885)
- Die Piraten (1886)
- Der Vizeadmiral (1886), with F. Zell, operetta in 3 acts (Music: Carl Millöcker)
- Die Dreizehn (1887)
- Die Jagd nach dem Glück (1888), with Bruno Zappert, operetta in 3 acts (Music: Franz von Suppé)
- Signora Vedetta (1892)
- Die wachsame Schildwache (1893)
- Freund Felix (1894)

=== Musical compositions ===
- In 1876, Genée composed the operetta Der Seekadett. The operetta featured a game of chess in its second act and later lent its name to the chess opening trap, the Seekadettenmatt (German for midshipman's mate). The move is usually known in English as the Légal Trap.
- Rosita (1864), opera
- Nanon, die Wirtin Zum Goldenen Lamm (1877), with F. Zell, operetta in 3 acts
- Der Musikfeind (1862), operetta
- Insalata Italiana, Op. 68 ("Piano, piano, dolce, soave!"), for madrigal choir and soloists, in which the words are Italian musical expressions sung according to the meaning of the words.

== Films based on his works ==
- Das fidele Gefängnis, directed by Ernst Lubitsch (Germany, 1917, loosely based on the operetta Die Fledermaus)
- Die Fledermaus, directed by Max Mack (Germany, 1923, based on the operetta Die Fledermaus)
- Nanon, directed by Hanns Schwarz (Germany, 1924, based on the operetta Nanon)
- The Beggar Student, directed by Luise Fleck and Jacob Fleck (Germany, 1927, based on the operetta Der Bettelstudent)
- The Beggar Student, directed by Victor Janson (Germany, 1931, based on the operetta Der Bettelstudent)
- The Beggar Student, directed by Victor Hanbury and John Harvel (UK, 1931, based on the operetta Der Bettelstudent)
- Die Fledermaus, directed by Karel Lamač (Germany, 1931, based on the operetta Die Fledermaus)
  - La Chauve-Souris, directed by Karel Lamač and Pierre Billon (France, 1932, based on the operetta Die Fledermaus)
- Waltz Time, directed by Wilhelm Thiele (UK, 1933, based on the operetta Die Fledermaus)
- The Loves of Madame Dubarry, directed by Marcel Varnel (UK, 1935, based on the operetta Die Dubarry)
- The Beggar Student, directed by Georg Jacoby (Germany, 1936, based on the operetta Der Bettelstudent)
- Die Fledermaus, directed by Paul Verhoeven (Germany, 1937, based on the operetta Die Fledermaus)
- Gasparone, directed by Georg Jacoby (Germany, 1937, based on the operetta Gasparone)
- Nanon, directed by Herbert Maisch (Germany, 1938, based on the operetta Nanon)
- Boccaccio, directed by Marcello Albani (Italy, 1940, based on the operetta Boccaccio)
- Die Fledermaus, directed by Géza von Bolváry (Germany, 1944–46, based on the operetta Die Fledermaus)
- A Night in Venice, directed by Georg Wildhagen (Austria, 1953, based on the operetta Eine Nacht in Venedig)
- Oh... Rosalinda!!, directed by Michael Powell and Emeric Pressburger (UK, 1955, based on the operetta Die Fledermaus)
- Swelling Melodies, directed by E. W. Fiedler (East Germany, 1955, based on the operetta Die Fledermaus)
- Gasparone, directed by Karl Paryla (Austria, 1956, based on the operetta Gasparone)
- The Beggar Student, directed by Werner Jacobs (West Germany, 1956, based on the operetta Der Bettelstudent)
- Mazurka der Liebe, directed by Hans Müller (East Germany, 1957, based on the operetta Der Bettelstudent)
- Die Fledermaus, directed by Géza von Cziffra (Austria, 1962, based on the operetta Die Fledermaus)
- Flagermusen, directed by Annelise Meineche (Denmark, 1966, based on the operetta Die Fledermaus)
- Die Fledermaus, directed by Yan Frid (Soviet Union, 1979, based on the operetta Die Fledermaus)
