= Esther Réthy =

Hungarian soprano (1912–2004)

External audio
- Shellac recordings and performances with Esther Réthyin the Online Archive of the Österreichische Mediathek (registration required)

Esther Réthy (22 October 1912 – 28 January 2004) was a Hungarian operatic soprano who had a major career in Europe from 1934 through 1968. She was notably a principal artist at the Vienna State Opera for over a decade and was a frequent performer at the Salzburg Festival. She performed a broad opera repertoire that encompassed French, German, Italian, Czech, and Hungarian operas. The latter part of her career was dedicated mainly to performing the German operetta literature at the Vienna Volksoper. A very beautiful woman, she was a greatly admired Angele in Richard Heuberger’s Der Opernball.

== Biography ==
Born in Budapest, Réthy studied singing with Magda Rigó in her native city and in Vienna. In 1934 she made her professional opera debut at the Hungarian State Opera House as the Shepherd in Richard Wagner's Tannhäuser. She remained at that house for the next three years, drawing particular acclaim as Micaëla in Georges Bizet's Carmen. She also appeared as a guest artist at a number of opera houses in Central Europe.

In 1937, Réthy became a principal artist at the Vienna State Opera, where she committed until 1949. She made her first appearance at that house as Marguerite in Charles Gounod's Faust with Jussi Björling in the title role. Her other roles with the company included Agathe in Carl Maria von Weber's Der Freischütz, Countess Almaviva in Wolfgang Amadeus Mozart's Le nozze di Figaro, Alice Ford in Giuseppe Verdi's Falstaff, Desdemona in Verdi's Otello, Eva in Wagner's Die Meistersinger von Nürnberg, Lauretta in Giacomo Puccini's Gianni Schicchi, Mařenka in Bedřich Smetana's The Bartered Bride, Micaela, Mimì in Puccini's La bohème, Pamina in Mozart's The Magic Flute, Violetta Valéry in Verdi's La traviata, and the title role in George Frideric Handel's Rodelinda among others.

While singing in Vienna, Réthy was active as a guest artist with many European opera houses. She remained a frequent performer at the Hungarian State Opera House and appeared often as a guest at the Bavarian State Opera, Berlin State Opera, and Semperoper under such conductors as Karl Böhm, Victor de Sabata, Wilhelm Furtwängler, Hans Knappertsbusch, Clemens Krauss, and Josef Krips. She became internationally famous through her many appearances at the Salzburg Festival where she sang Susanna in Mozart's Le nozze di Figaro (1937–1939, 1941 with Ezio Pinza as Figaro), Sophie in Richard Strauss'a Der Rosenkavalier (1937–1939), Donna Elvira in Mozart's Don Giovanni (1950), and Europa in the first public performance of Strauss’s Die Liebe der Danae (1952). She also appeared at the 1940 Salzburg Festival in an operetta concert. In 1940, she was supposed to appear in several roles at the Metropolitan Opera in New York City, but the events of World War II made this impossible.

After World War II, Réthy became a highly lauded performer in operettas, beginning with a triumphant portrayal of Rosalinde in Johann Strauss II's Die Fledermaus under the baton of Herbert von Karajan at the Vienna State Opera. From 1948 she sang frequently at the Vienna Volksoper in the operettas of Emmerich Kálmán, Franz Lehár, and Strauss. Her first performances at the house were as Annina in Eine Nacht in Venedig and Saffi in Der Zigeunerbaron. Her operetta repertoire grew to include Angèle Didier in Der Graf von Luxemburg, Angele in Der Opernball, Fiametta in Boccaccio, Gabriele in Wiener Blut, Hanna Glawari in Die Lustige Witwe, and Laura in Der Bettelstudent among others.

Réthy retired from the stage in 1968, after which she was committed to teaching singing in Vienna. She died there at the age of 91 in 2004. She was married to Dr. Vincent Imre. Her son, Laszló Imre, became a successful conductor.

== Awards and honors ==
- Kammersängerin 1948
- Honorary member of the Vienna State Opera (1975)
- Honorary Member of the Vienna Volksoper
- Gold medal of the Republic of Austria (1958)
- Medal of Honor of the Federal capital, Vienna Gold (1978)
- Golden Diploma of the Franz Liszt College (1983)
