= Josef Josephi =

Austrian singer and actor

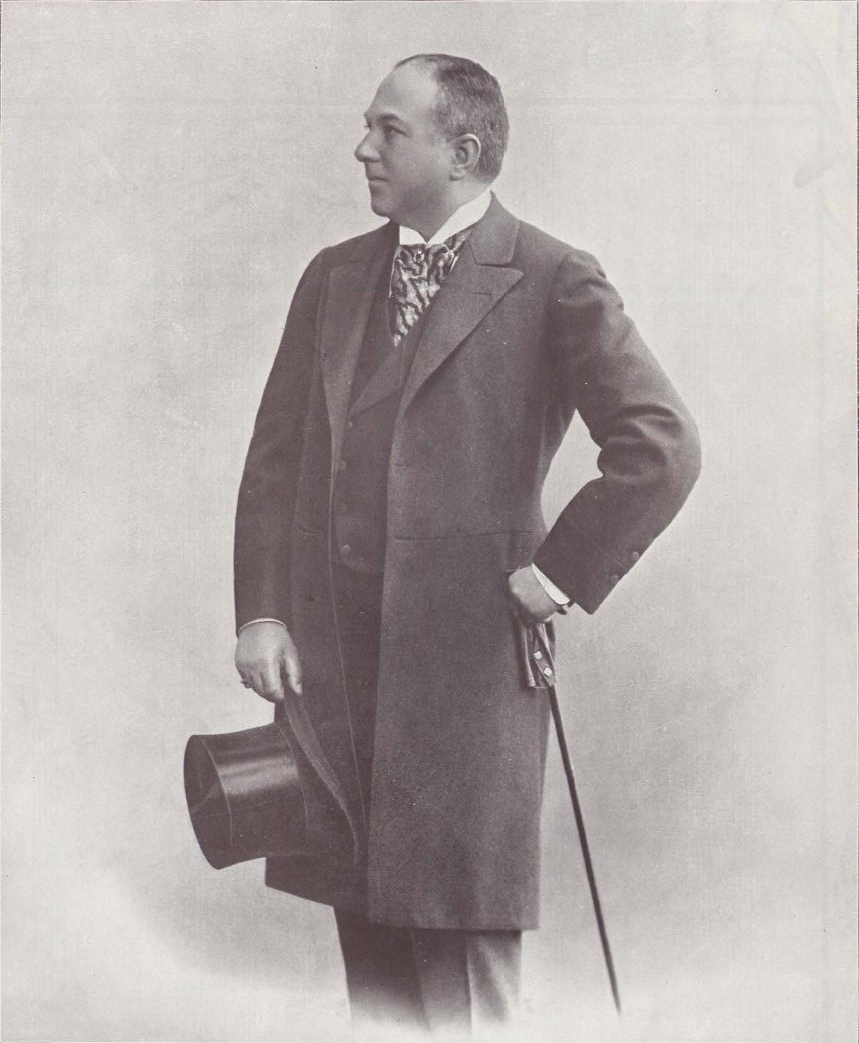
- Josef Josephi, 1901
- Born: Josef Ichhäuser; 15 July 1852; Kraków, Poland
- Died: 8 January 1920 (aged 67); Berlin, Germany
- Burial place: Hietzing Cemetery, Vienna
- Occupations: Singer, actor

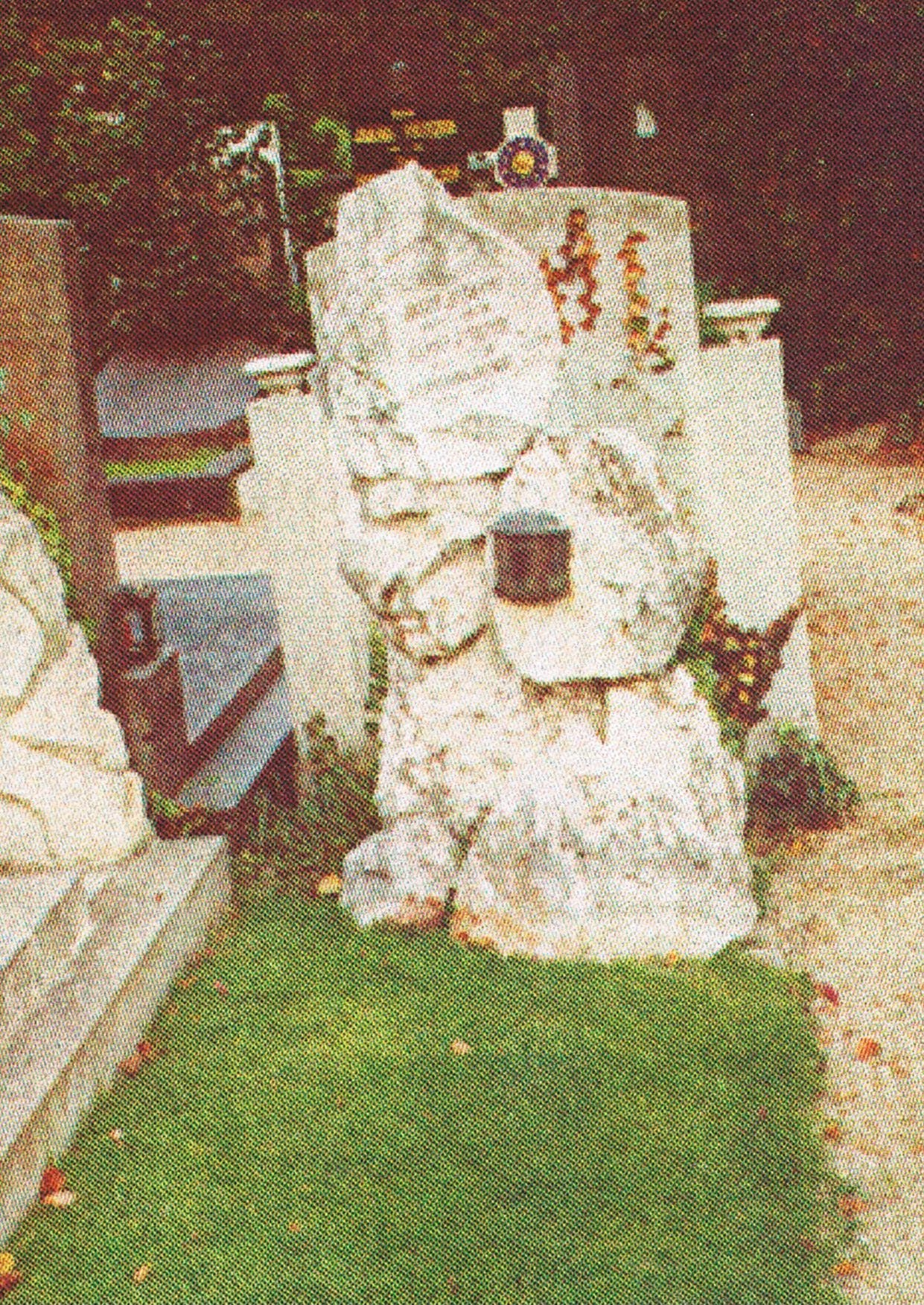
Grave of Josef Josephi

Josef Ichhäuser (1852–1920), known by the stage name Josef Josephi (also spelled Joseffy), was an Austrian Empire-born singer (tenor-baritone) and actor.

== Life ==
Ichhäuser was born on 15 July 1852 in Kraków.

He was the son of a cloth merchant. He graduated from high school in 1871 and made his debut in 1873 in Vienna in a small role as a soldier in Friedrich Schiller’s Fiesco. His apprenticeship led him to Nagykanizsa, Chemnitz and Wrocław. In 1878 he joined the Ringtheater in Vienna. In 1880 he played at the Carltheater, and in 1883 at the Theater an der Wien.

Successes in performing vocal roles led him to the decision to become a singer.

He sang in Johann Strauss II's Eine Nacht in Venedig and The Gypsy Baron, and in Vilém Blodek's comic one-act opera V studni (In the Well). Together with Alexander Girardi, Karl Lindau, and Therese Biedermann, he formed the Elitekorps (elite corps) of the Viennese operetta.

In 1900 he moved to Berlin. From 1906 he was for two years at the Woltersdorff Theater and then engaged for five years at the Metropol-Theater.

He stood for the last time on the stage on New Year's Eve, 1919. He died on 8 January 1920 in Berlin and was buried at the Hietzing Cemetery in Vienna.

== Main roles ==
- Jan Janicki in Der Bettelstudent by Carl Millöcker (1882)
- Guido in Eine Nacht in Venedig by Johann Strauss II (1883)
- Conte Erminio in Gasparone by Carl Millöcker (1884)
- Botho von Wendt in Waldmeister by Johann Strauss II (1895)
