= Camillo Walzel =

German librettist and theatre director

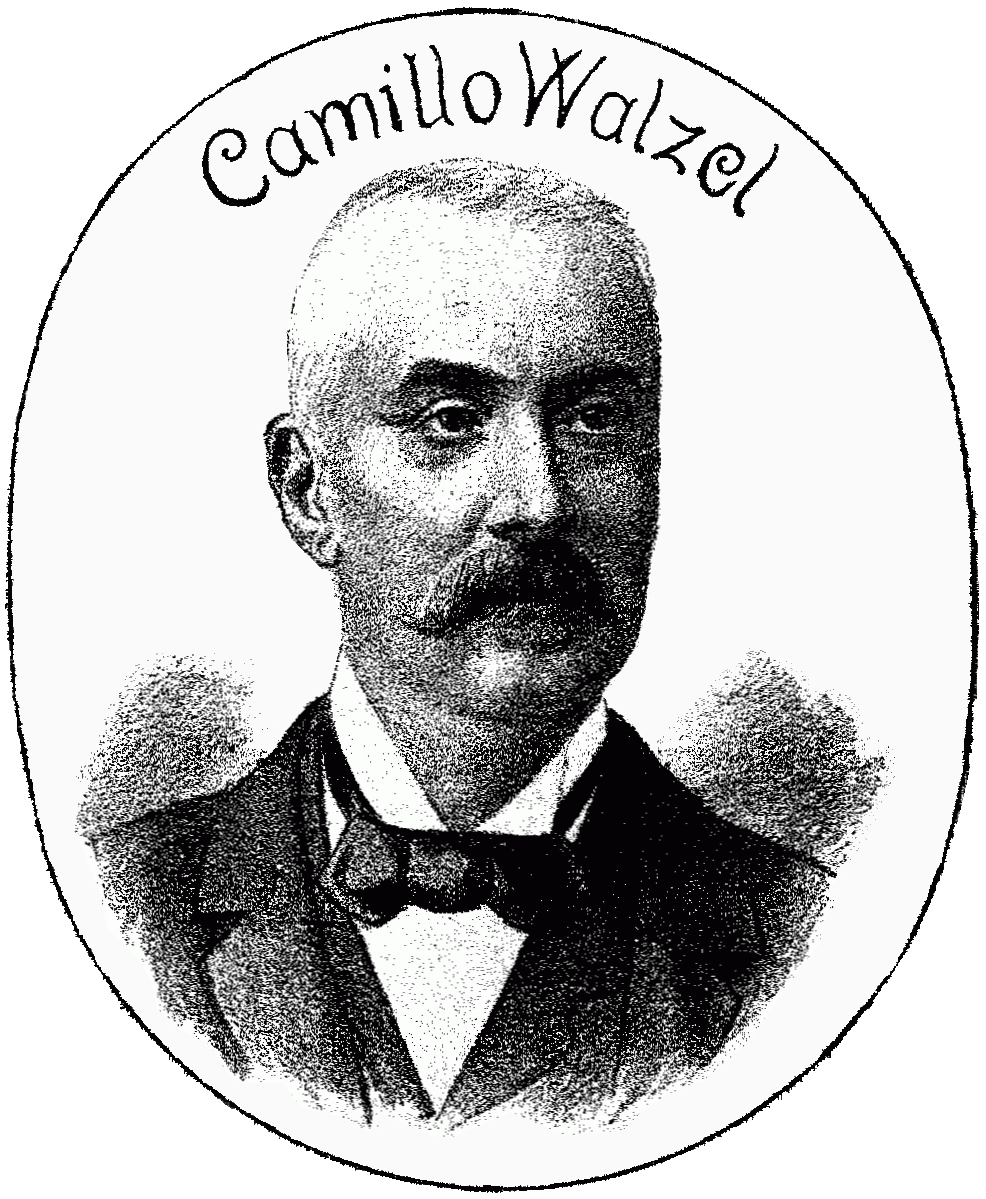
Camillo Walzel (1893), by "R. Weber" from Der Floh, issue #53

Camillo Walzel (11 February 1829 –17 March 1895) was a German librettist and theatre director, who wrote under the pseudonym F Zell.

== Life and work ==
Walzel was born in Magdeburg. In his early years, he worked in his father's lithographic factory, then studied at the Academy of Fine Arts Vienna, before joining the army. He later became an editor for a newspaper, then an employee of the Danube Steamship Company in 1856.

He became an operetta librettist in the 1860s and eventually, from 1884 to 1889, artistic director of the Theater an der Wien. One of his best-known works was the libretto for Karl Millöcker's operetta Der Bettelstudent, which he co-wrote with his long-term collaborator Richard Genée). His other libretti with Genée included Cagliostro in Wien (1875), Der lustige Krieg (1881) and Eine Nacht in Venedig (1883), all with music by Johann Strauss II.

He died in Vienna.

== Filmography ==
- Nanon, directed by Hanns Schwarz (Germany, 1924, based on the operetta Nanon)
- The Beggar Student, directed by Luise Fleck and Jacob Fleck (Germany, 1927, based on the operetta Der Bettelstudent)
- The Beggar Student, directed by Victor Janson (Germany, 1931, based on the operetta Der Bettelstudent)
- The Beggar Student, directed by Victor Hanbury and John Harvel (UK, 1931, based on the operetta Der Bettelstudent)
- The Loves of Madame Dubarry, directed by Marcel Varnel (UK, 1935, based on the operetta Die Dubarry)
- The Beggar Student, directed by Georg Jacoby (Germany, 1936, based on the operetta Der Bettelstudent)
- Gasparone, directed by Georg Jacoby (Germany, 1937, based on the operetta Gasparone)
- Nanon, directed by Herbert Maisch (Germany, 1938, based on the operetta Nanon)
- Boccaccio, directed by Marcello Albani (Italy, 1940, based on the operetta Boccaccio)
- A Night in Venice, directed by Georg Wildhagen (Austria, 1953, based on the operetta Eine Nacht in Venedig)
- Gasparone, directed by Karl Paryla (Austria, 1956, based on the operetta Gasparone)
- The Beggar Student, directed by Werner Jacobs (West Germany, 1956, based on the operetta Der Bettelstudent)
- Mazurka der Liebe, directed by Hans Müller (East Germany, 1957, based on the operetta Der Bettelstudent)
