= Academy Theatre (TV series) =

American dramatic anthology TV series (1949)

- Genre: Drama
- Country of origin: United States
- Original language: English

Production
- Producer: F. Curtis Canfield

Original release
- Network: NBC
- Release: July 25 – September 12, 1949

Academy Theatre is an American drama anthology television series that aired on NBC from July 25, 1949, to September 12, 1949. It ran for eight weeks as the summer replacement for Chevrolet on Broadway.

== Format ==
The series utilized a different cast each week who appeared in short works by established playwrights. The plays were broadcast live from 8 to 8:30 p.m. Eastern Time on Monday nights.

== Selected episodes ==
Title	Playwright	Original airdate	Cast
The Stolen Prince	Dan Totheroh	August 1, 1949	Shirley Dale, Ian MacDonald
Drums of Oude	Austin Strong	August 8, 1949	Richard Newton, Emily Lawrence, Peter Pagan
In the Shadow of the Glen	J.M. Synge	August 15, 1949	Anne Jackson, Barry McCullen, Peter Wynn, Paul Anderson
Summer Comes to the Diamond O	Robert Finch	August 29, 1949	Jack Davis
Aria da Capo	Edna St. Vincent Millay	September 5, 1949	Michael Higgins

== Development ==
In April 1949, Charles R. Denny, NBC executive vice-president and a graduate of Amherst College, arranged for a production of Julius Caesar to be broadcast to 14 cities nationwide. The play was performed by the Amherst College Masquers and directed by F. Curtis Canfield, a professor at Amherst and director of Amherst's Kirby Theatre. The broadcast marked the first time that an entire play by Shakespeare aired on television.

During the following summer, Canfield (who would later become the first dean of the Yale School of Drama), again collaborated with NBC to bring a series of one-act plays to the network. Academy Theatre was the result.

During a sabbatical as an NBC producer, Canfield convinced the network to create Masterpiece Playhouse, one-hour productions of seven classic plays including Hedda Gabler, Uncle Vanya, and Othello. Broadcast in 1950, each play was produced for the "heavy-budget" sum of $10,000.

== Production ==
Canfield was the producer, and Mark Hawley was the director.

== Critical response ==
After two episodes of the show had been broadcast, a reviewer wrote in The New York Times that broadcasting of Academy Theatre "is certainly a move by which both the industry and the audience will be served." Adams commended the initial presentation, The Stolen Prince, despite pointing out its flaws, because "many viewers in the television audience might now have some conception of Chinese drama". Adams said that the second episode, Mr. Lincoln's Whiskers, "had a refreshing charm seldom achieved by a television production."

A review of "The Drums of Oude" in the trade publication Variety described the episode as "pretty academic", adding, "There was hardly a trace of real emotion or suspense in this drama ...". The review placed most of the blame on "an uninspiring script" laden with stereotypes. Additionally, the review concluded, "... the staging was inept and the cast phony and stiff."
