= Mazurka der Liebe =

1957 film

- Directed by: Hans Müller
- Written by: Camillo Walzel (libretto); Richard Genée (libretto)
- Music by: Carl Millöcker (operetta)
- Release date: 1957
- Country: East Germany
- Language: German

Mazurka der Liebe is an East German film. It was released in 1957. It is an adaptation of the 1882 operetta Der Bettelstudent.
