= The Loves of Madame Dubarry =

I Give My Heart
- Directed by: Marcel Varnel
- Written by: Roger Burford; Frank Launder; Curt Siodmak; Richard Genée (1879 libretto); Camillo Walzel (1879 libretto); Paul Knepler (1931 libretto); Ignaz Michael Welleminsky (1931 libretto); Hans Martin Cremer (1931 libretto)
- Based on: The DuBarry by Carl Millöcker
- Produced by: Walter C. Mycroft
- Starring: Gitta Alpar; Patrick Waddington; Owen Nares; Arthur Margetson
- Cinematography: Claude Friese-Greene
- Production company: British International Pictures
- Distributed by: Wardour Films, England
- Release dates: 25 October 1935 (London, England)
- Running time: 90 minutes
- Country: United Kingdom
- Language: English

I Give My Heart (US-Title: The Loves of Madame Dubarry) is a 1935 British historical film adapted from the stage operetta The DuBarry by Carl Millöcker and arranged by Theo Mackeben. Directed by Marcel Varnel, and produced by British International Pictures (BIP). It is based on the life of Madame Du Barry.

== Plot ==
Jeanne is a milliner courted by aristocrats. She first has an affair with René, a young writer for Count du Barry. She then marries the Count in order to become Louis XV's mistress.

== Cast ==
- Gitta Alpar as Madame du Barry
- Patrick Waddington as René
- Owen Nares as Louis XV of France
- Arthur Margetson as Count Du Barry
- Margaret Bannerman as Marechale
- Hugh Miller as Choiseul
- Gibb McLaughlin as De Brissac
- Iris Ashley as Margot
- Hay Petrie as Cascal
- Cicely Paget-Bowman
- Philip Ridgeway

== Critical reception ==
Allmovie described it as "standard historical-drama fare, allowing dozens of top European actors to play "dress-up" for 90 minutes"; while TV Guide noted "A rather stiff British production that is well done but not compelling," rating it 2/5 stars.
