= Gräfin Dubarry =

1879 operetta by Carl Millöcker

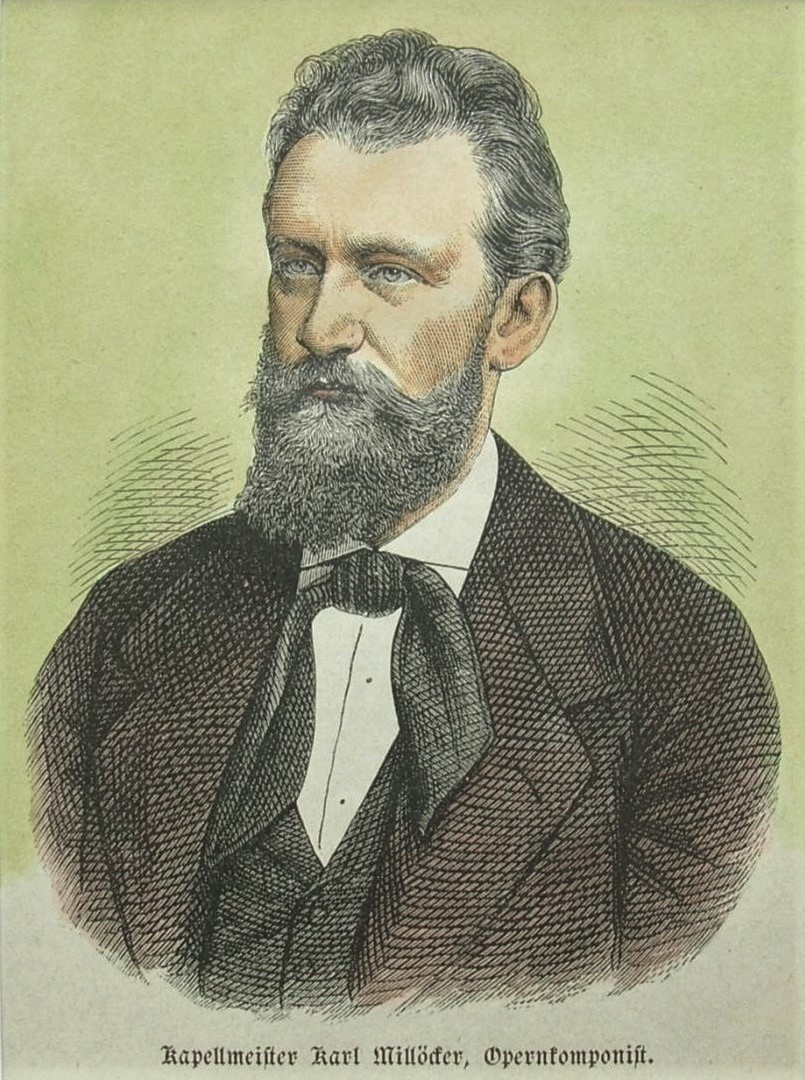
Carl Millöcker (1883)

Gräfin Dubarry is an operetta in three acts by Carl Millöcker to a German libretto by F. Zell and Richard Genée. The story concerns Madame du Barry, the mistress of Louis XV, King of France.

== Performance history ==
The operetta had its premiere on 31 October 1879 at the Theater an der Wien, Vienna.

== Die Dubarry ==
A radically new version of the work, in nine scenes under the title Die Dubarry, was prepared by Theo Mackeben with music from the original Gräfin Dubarry as well as other works, and a new text was written by Paul Knepler, Ignaz Michael Welleminsky and Hans Martin Cremer. This was first given at the Admiralspalast in Berlin on 14 August 1931. According to Andrew Lamb, the production introduced "alien structures and orchestration" compared with the original. This was filmed as The Loves of Madame Dubarry in 1935, and as The Dubarry toured the UK in 1932 starring Binnie Hale and opened at Her Majesty's Theatre on 14 April 1932 with Anny Ahlers, Helen Haye and Mimi Crawford. An EP was released by Anny Ahlers with the songs "I Give My Heart", "The Dubarry", "Beauty", "Happy Little Jeanne" and "Today". An adaptation arranged by Theo Mackeben with additional numbers by Alan Melville and Charles Zwar opened at the Princes Theatre in London on 8 October 1947, starring Irene Manning as Jeanne heading a cast which also featured Ada Reeve as Mme Sauterelle and John Le Mesurier as Comte Lamond. This production ran for just 45 performances.

== Roles ==
Roles, voice types
Role	Voice type	Premiere cast, 31 October 1879 Conductor: Carl Millöcker	Die Dubarry cast, 14 August 1931 Conductor: Theo Mackeben
Marie Jeanne Bécu, a milliner, later Comtesse Dubarry	soprano		Gitta Alpár
René Lavallery, a painter	tenor		Egon Brosig
Margot, a milliner	soprano		Edith Schollwer
Marquis de Brissac, her friend	tenor		
Comte Dubarry	baritone		Schnell
King Louis XV	baritone		
Duc de Choiseul, Chief Minister	spoken		
Prince Soubise	spoken		
Duc de Lazun	spoken		
Radix de St. Foix	spoken		
Baron Chamard	spoken		
Lebell	spoken		
Marschallin von Luxembourg	spoken		
Lucille	spoken		
Pierre	spoken		
Madame Labille	spoken		
Marianne Verrières	spoken		
Claude Verrières	spoken		
Abbé	spoken		
Neighbour	spoken		
Attendants, companions, servants, milliners, people of Paris (chorus)

== Synopsis ==
The story is set in Paris and Versailles in 1764.

== Film versions ==
After the 1935 British film The Loves of Madame Dubarry, a German film version The Dubarry was made in Germany in 1951 by Georg Wildhagen, with Sári Barabás, Mathieu Ahlersmeyer, Willy Fritsch, Albert Lieven and Walter Müller.

== See also ==
- Der Bettelstudent
- Gasparone
