= The Beggar Student (1940 novel) =

1940 Japanese novella by Osamu Dazai

- Author: Osamu Dazai
- Original title: 乞食学生
- Language: Japanese
- Genre: Novella
- Publisher: Wakakusa
- Publication date: July 1940
- Publication place: Japan

The Beggar Student (乞食学生, Kojiki Gakusei) is a 1940 Japanese novella by Osamu Dazai. Set in Tokyo during WWII, the story stars a fictionalized version of the author who is roused from his depression by a high school dropout named Saeki and convinced to take his place as the live narrator for a silent film. Sharing a title with an 1882 operetta by Carl Millöcker, the book makes frequent reference to classic European literature and touches upon aspects of early twentieth-century cinema.

== Summary ==
A depressed 32-year-old writer named Takeo Kimura, whose pen name is Dazai and who is loosely based on the author, walks along the riverbank of the Tamagawa Aqueduct in Mitaka when he hears somebody drowning in the water. Running blindly to the rescue, he trips over the swimmer, who has come safely ashore and is sunbathing in the nude. The annoyed boy, Saeki, grills Kimura on his knowledge of great thinkers and concludes that all writers must be dumb.

Trying to reclaim his dignity, Kimura treats Saeki to a meal of oyakodon rice in a teahouse by Inokashira Pond. Through reverse psychology, Saeki convinces Kimura to trade places with him that night as the benshi for a silent film about springtime in Hokkaido. Since Saeki has already pawned his uniform, the two head to Shibuya to visit Saeki's former classmate Kumamoto, an uptight boy who has a habit of pretending to have read great works of literature he barely knows. After the writer changes into one of Kumamoto's ill-fitting uniforms, tension grows between the two young friends, who bicker and trade insults in attempts to come across as smart.

On their way to the film, Saeki pulls a knife on Kimura, who defuses the situation by spending all his money on beers for the boys. Kumamoto is uneasy, and Saeki becomes morose, but Kimura launches into a drunk lecture about the importance of speaking from the heart. Saeki then admits he has been lying about the silent movie this whole time, though Kimura instantly forgives him. When they hit the streets, Kimura sings an old German drinking song so loudly he is stopped by a cop, who asks the boys where they go to school.

Kimura then wakes up on the grass by the aqueduct to the sound of Saeki's voice. This time, however, Saeki is dressed in a college student's uniform and shiny shoes. He claims to not be named Saeki or know Kumamoto or have any clue what Kimura is talking about. It remains unclear whether the narrator really experienced the story or fell asleep on the banks of the Tamagawa Canal in Inokashira Park and merely dreamed it. Perplexed, he goes to the teahouse and orders a bottle of Calpis to feel young again. He sentimentally recalls the student song of old days.

== Style ==
The Beggar Student is narrated in the first person by a writer who is thirty-two years old and lives in Mitaka, both of which applied to Dazai at the time the story was published. (Note: as per East Asian age reckoning) The scholar James O'Brien notes that while the novel "seems overtly autobiographical," it includes pointedly counterfactual information, like when the protagonist introduces himself to Saeki and his friend Kumamoto as "Takeo Kimura," while confessing in an aside to the reader that Dazai is just a penname.

Like the unnamed narrator of the foreword and afterword to Dazai's opus No Longer Human, the narrator of The Beggar Student uses the gender-neutral personal pronoun "Watashi" (私), recounting the events of the story in a confessional manner. Scholar and Dazai translator Donald Keene, however, argues that Dazai was not an "I" novelist because he was "in no sense a faithful chronicler of his own life," citing how the author's attempted love suicide of 1930 is depicted in at least five different ways throughout his body of work.

== Literary allusions ==
The Beggar Student opens with an epigraph from François Villon and contains several quotations from Villon's collection Le Testament, which Dazai is thought to have adapted from Teruo Sato's 1940 translations of Villon. The book also references Goethe's Faust and Three Tales by Gustave Flaubert, as well as a song from the 1901 play Old Heidelberg.

The "beggar student" of the title refers to Saeki, a boy of modest means whose school expenses have been paid for by a wealthy politician named Hayama. Critics have speculated that Dazai borrowed the title from a 1936 film adaptation of the Millöcker play, based on the fact that the film was released and reviewed widely in Japan in 1938, including a prominent review in the literary magazine Wakakusa where the novella was first serialized and where Dazai published a total of ten works over a six-year period surrounding the release of the film.

== Cultural impact and legacy ==
The Beggar Student remains closely associated with the events of the author's life due to its setting at the Tamagawa Aqueduct, where Dazai would attempt suicide for the fifth and final time in 1948. In order to give his fans a place to pay their respects, the city of Mitaka installed a memorial site at the portion of the river promenade where Dazai is thought to have ended his life. The site consists of a stone quarried in Dazai's hometown of Kanagi and a metal panel inscribed with an excerpt from chapter one of The Beggar Student, describing the river as a "tunnel of green," the way it looks in spring after the cherry blossoms fall. The panel also features an engraving of a photo by Shigeru Tamura of the author seated on the banks of the canal near where the memorial was placed.

== See also ==
- No Longer Human
- Der Bettelstudent
- Alt Heidelberg
- François Villon
- Gustave Flaubert
