= 559 Nanon =

Main-belt asteroid

Discovery
- Discovered by: M. F. Wolf
- Discovery site: Heidelberg Observatory
- Discovery date: 8 March 1905

Designations
- Pronunciation: German: [ˈnaːnɔn]
- Alternative designations: 1905 QD

Orbital characteristics
- Epoch 31 July 2016 (JD 2457600.5)
- Uncertainty parameter 0
- Observation arc: 111.11 yr (40584 d)
- Aphelion: 2.8938 AU (432.91 Gm)
- Perihelion: 2.5311 AU (378.65 Gm)
- Semi-major axis: 2.7124 AU (405.77 Gm)
- Eccentricity: 0.066852
- Orbital period (sidereal): 4.47 yr (1631.7 d)
- Mean anomaly: 289.44°
- Mean motion: 0° 13^{m} 14.268^{s} / day
- Inclination: 9.3018°
- Longitude of ascending node: 112.134°
- Argument of perihelion: 128.450°

Physical characteristics
- Mean radius: 39.91±1.35 km
- Synodic rotation period: 10.059 h (0.4191 d)
- Geometric albedo: 0.0500±0.004
- Absolute magnitude (H): 9.6

559 Nanon is a minor planet orbiting the Sun. At the time of its discovery, Max Wolf was habitually naming asteroids after operatic heroines, suggesting is it most likely named after the lead character of Nanon, an 1877 opera by Richard Genée.
