= A Night in Venice (1953 film) =

1953 film by Georg Wildhagen

- Directed by: Georg Wildhagen
- Written by: Richard Genée (libretto); Camillo Walzel (libretto); Rudolf Österreicher
- Produced by: J.A. Vesely
- Starring: Hans Olden; Jeanette Schultze; Peter Pasetti; Marianne Schönauer
- Cinematography: Walter Tuch
- Edited by: Paula Dvorak; Leopoldine Pokorny
- Music by: Johann Strauss (operetta); Nico Dostal
- Production companies: Nova-Film; Wien-Film
- Distributed by: Universal-Film
- Release date: 16 October 1953
- Running time: 76 minutes
- Country: Austria
- Language: German

A Night in Venice (German: Eine Nacht in Venedig) is a 1953 Austrian operetta film directed by Georg Wildhagen and starring Hans Olden, Jeanette Schultze and Peter Pasetti. It was adapted from the 1883 operetta Eine Nacht in Venedig by Johann Strauss, which had previously been turned into a 1934 film A Night in Venice directed by Robert Wiene.

The film was shot in the Soviet-controlled Rosenhügel Studios in Vienna.

== Cast ==
- Hans Olden as Herzog Guido von Urbino
- Jeanette Schultze as Annina
- Peter Pasetti as Coramello
- Marianne Schönauer as Barbara Delaqua
- Alfred Neugebauer as Senator Delaqua
- Lotte Lang as Ciboletta
- Hermann Thimig as Pappacoda
- Egon von Jordan as Benvenuto
- Annie Rosar as Agricola Barbuccio
- Joseph Egger as Barbuccio
- Julia Drapal as Petronella / Solo Tänzerin
- Hugo Gottschlich as Francesco
- Heinrich Schweiger as Enrico

== Bibliography ==
- Goble, Alan. The Complete Index to Literary Sources in Film. Walter de Gruyter, 1999.
