= Bruno Zappert =

Austrian dramatist and journalist

- Born: 28 January 1845; Vienna, Austrian Empire
- Died: 31 January 1892 (aged 47); Vienna, Austria-Hungary
- Writing career
- Pen name: Zeno Brunner
- Language: German
- Notable works: Ein Hochgeborener (1877); Ein Böhm in Amerika (1880); Pamperl's Abenteuer (1883); Johann Nestroy (1888)

Bruno Zappert (28 January 1845 – 31 January 1892) was an Austrian dramatist and journalist.

== Biography ==
Bruno Zappert was born into a Jewish family in Sechshaus, Vienna, in 1845. His father, the manufacturer August Zappert, came from a prominent Jewish family which originated in Bohemia and later spread to Hungary and Lower Austria. He received his early education at a gymnasium. Although he aspired to pursue university studies, he enrolled in the Vienna Commercial Academy in 1862 to prepare to take over his father's business.

After his father's unexpected death, Bruno changed course and entered the publishing business in Vienna. He began by learning the trade from Wallishauser, and in 1869, he assumed full control of Hügel's establishment in Herrengasse, overseeing its operations until 1877. He then shifted his focus to dramatic literature, becoming secretary and artistic director at the Presburg Theatre, and later dramatist of the Carltheater. There he worked for two years under Franz Steiner, and for three years under Tatarczy.

Zappert edited the Wiener Leben from 1879, Langer's Hans Jürgel from 1885 to 1886, and the illustrated Wiener Wespen from 1886 to 1887. He also collaborated on other Vienna journals as a feuilletonist. Zappert's main activity, however, was as a dramatist, frequently collaborating with figures such as Richard Genée, Karl Costa, Julius Rosen, Wilhelm Mannstädt, and D. Oeribaner. His farces and popular dramas were considerably popular. He also wrote comic and topical songs for the stage, as well as celebration plays and prologues.

== Plays ==
- Zwischen Zwei Uebeln. 1870. Musical farce in one act, with music by Franz Roth.
- Die Czarin. 1872. operetta in three acts, with music by Max Wolf.
- Ein Hochgeborener. 1877. Popular piece in three acts, with music by H. Delin.
- Ein Junger Drahrer. 1878. Musical farce in three acts, with music by Paul Mestrozi.
- Zappert, Bruno (1878). Ninischerl. Parody in one act, with music by Ludwig Gothov-Grünecke.
- Cri-cri. 1879. Musical picture from life in one act.
- Die Glöckerln am Kornfeld. 1879. parody on Robert Planquette's Les cloches de Corneville with music by Gothov-Grüneke.
- Eine Parforcejagd Durch Europa. 1879. Extravaganza in three tableaux, with music by Julius Hopp.
- Ein Böhm in Amerika. 1880. Musical burlesque in six tableaux, with music by Gothov-Grüneke.
- Moderne Weiber. 1880. Musical farce in three tableaux, with music by Gothov-Grüneke.
- Pressburger Luft. 1882. Musical local farce in five tableaux.
- Der Paragraphenritter. Musical farce in four acts. First published as Doctor Schimmel.
- Pamperl's Abenteuer. 1883. Musical farce in three acts.
- Theaterblut. 1883. Musical farce in three acts.
- Papa Palugyay. 1884. Farce in one act.
- Reschfesch. 1884. Musical farce in one act.
- Sein Spezi. 1884. Musical farce in five acts, with music by Roth.
- Beim Sacher. 1887. Musical farce in one act, with music by Mestrozi.
- Der Glücksritter. 1887. With Genée and Mannstädt. Operetta in three acts, with music by Alphons Czibulka.
- Der Freibeuter. 1888. With Genée. Operetta in three acts from the French, with music by Planquette.
- Ein Deutschmeister. 1888–1889. With Genée. Operetta in three acts, with music by C. M. Ziehrer.
- Johann Nestroy. 1888. Musical popular piece in six tableaux.
- Die Jagd nach dem Glücke. 1888. With Genée. Operetta in three acts and an introduction, with music by Franz von Suppé; printed as a text-book and translated into five languages.
- Das Lachende Wien. Farce in six tableaux, with introduction.
- Die Herzogin von Newfoundland. With Genée. Operetta in three acts, with music by Ludwig Engländer.
- Prinz Eugen. With Genée. operetta in three acts, with music by I. R. Kral.
- Im Flug u die Welt. 1891. Fairy extravaganza.
