= Gasparone =

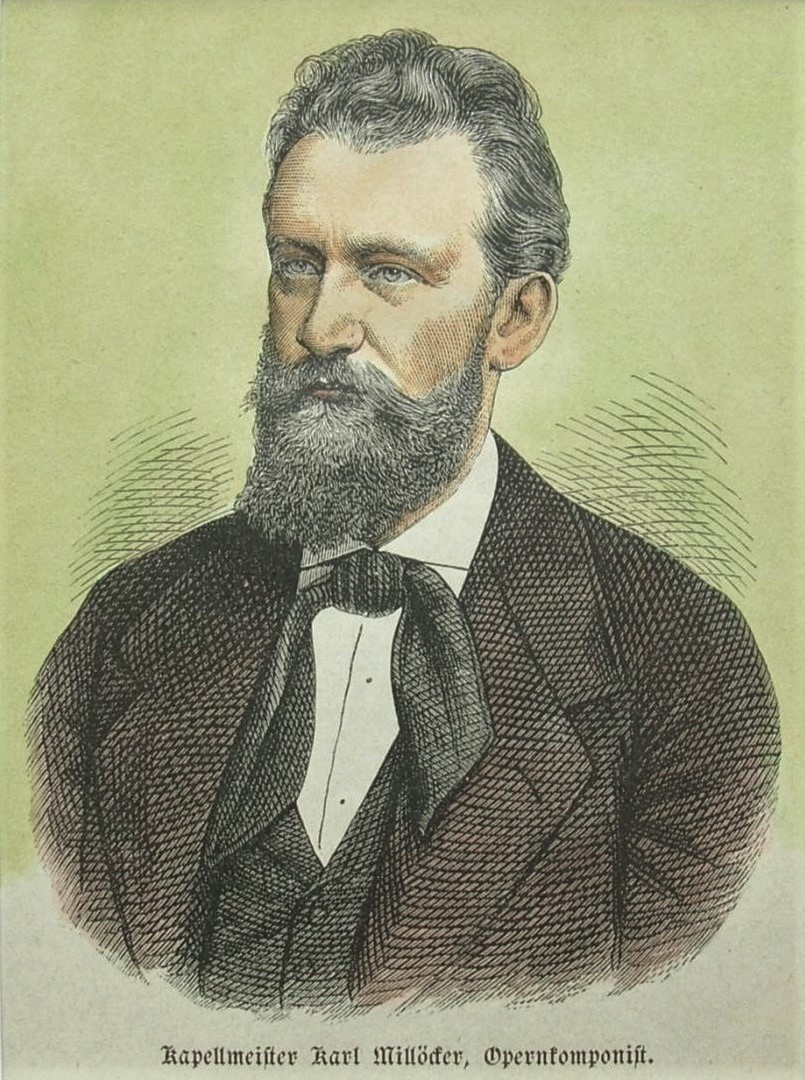
Carl Millöcker (1883)

Gasparone is an operetta in three acts by Carl Millöcker to a German libretto by Friedrich Zell and Richard Genée. The libretto was later revised by Ernst Steffan and Paul Knepler. An amusing feature of the work is that the title character never appears and acts as a scapegoat upon which all the misdeeds in Syracuse, Sicily, can be blamed.

== Performance history ==
The opera had its premiere on 26 January 1884 at the Theater an der Wien, Vienna. It was subsequently given in Berlin at the Friedrich-Wilhelmstädtisches Theater on September 26, 1884, and in New York City in German at the Thalia Theater in 1885 and in English at the Standard Theatre in 1885 and again in 1887 with Lillian Russell as Carlotta, Eugène Oudin as Count Erminio and J. H. Ryley.

After its debut, Millöcker revised the piece, creating eight versions. However, the most commonly used performing edition is that prepared in 1932 by the composer Ernst Steffan. This version includes "Dunkelrote Rosen" which Millöcker wrote as a vocal trio in the operetta Der Vizeadmiral. Ernst Steffan expanded the piece and Paul Knefler wrote new lyrics. Nevertheless, as Andrew Lamb has pointed out, this revision introduced new material and "reduced the effectiveness of Millöcker's comic-opera structures" in order to suit the taste of the 1930s.

== Roles ==
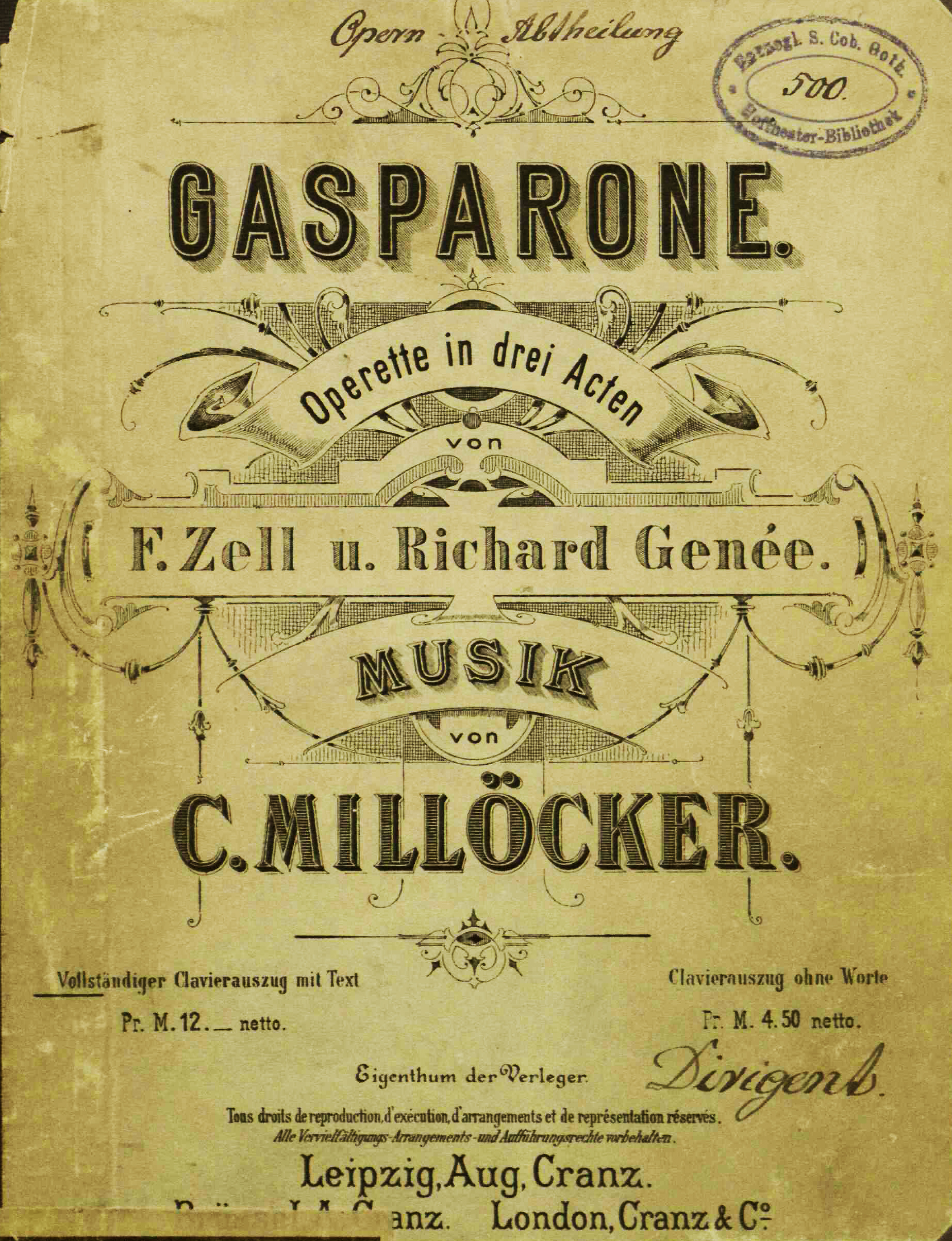
Title page of a piano–vocal score, 1885

Roles, voice types, premiere cast
Role	Voice type	Premiere cast, 26 January 1884 Conductor: Carl Millöcker)
Carlotta, widowed Countess Santa Croce	soprano	Maria Therese Massa
Count Erminio Saluzzo	tenor	Josef Josephi ("Joseffy")
Baboleno Nasoni, Mayor of Toresino	bass	Felix Schweighofer
Sindulfo, his son	tenor	
Benozzo, landlord of the Fisherman's Inn	tenor	Alexander Girardi
Sora, his wife	soubrette	Rosa Streitmann
Zenobia, duenna of the Countess	alto	
Massaccio, a smuggler, Benozzo's uncle	baritone	
Marietta, the Countess's maid	mezzo-soprano	
Luigi, Erminio's friend	speaking role	
Colonel Ruperto Corticelli	speaking role	
Lieutenant Guarini	speaking role	
Smugglers, Sora's friends, milkmaids, peasant girls, citizens of Syracuse, policemen, customs officers, boatmen (chorus)

== Synopsis ==
Place: Mediterranean coast near the town of Syracuse, Sicily
Time: 1820

The mayor, Baboleno Nasoni, is short of cash. He wants his son, Sindulfo, to marry the wealthy countess, then spend some of her money to pay his own bills. He leans on the innkeeper, Benozzo, who owes him back mortgage payments. The innkeeper can make ends meet only by petty smuggling as Gasparone, which is soon discovered by a visiting nobleman who makes him set up a prank by which the nobleman can win the attentions of the countess. The mayor perceives the mutual affections of the countess and the nobleman as interfering with his plans, suggesting the nobleman might be Gasparone. When the mayor's son treats the innkeepers' wife badly, and the innkeeper is put upon by the nobleman to pay another prank on the mayor, the innkeeper plots revenge as Gasparone. When the mayor's son is to marry the wealthy countess, the innkeeper kidnaps the mayor's son and his wife plays a trick to get the carriage transporting the marriage official to drive away with the marriage official still sitting in it. The nobleman proposes to the countess twice, once just as the marriage of the countess to the mayor's son is announced and once when the wedding guests show up but the groom doesn't. The innkeeper bursts in on the wedding guests and pretends he needs ten thousand to rescue the kidnapped mayor's son, planning to use some of it to pay off his back mortgage and the rest to support his wife. His wife catches him in this lie and insists he change his ways.

The countess' duenna and the mayor fancy each other. The duenna approaches the nobleman with the idea that everyone might end up with the love of their life if only there was a way to convince the mayor that the countess has no way of actually getting her hands on her millions. The nobleman bursts in on the countess pretending to be a masked bandit, and fantasy role plays that she should convince the mayor that her millions were stolen by Gasparone. The search for Gasparone intensifies. The mayor's son is convinced by the innkeeper that he could worm his way out his comic pickle by walking around with a gun borrowed from one of the smugglers and fib that he shot Gasparone single-handedly. The mayor and the duenna will marry. The countess and the nobleman will marry. The innkeeper and his wife are offered the ten thousand unused/phoney ransom as their gift to pay off the mortgage on the inn and close down the petty smuggling operation.

== Film version ==
A film version was made in Germany in 1937. It was produced by Max Pfeiffer and directed by Georg Jacoby, with Marika Rökk (Ita), Johannes Heesters (Erminio), Heinz Schorlemmer (Sindulfo), Edith Schollwer (Carlotta), Oskar Sima (Massaccio), Leo Slezak (Nasoni), Rudolf Platte (Benozzo), Elsa Wagner (Zenobia), and Ursula Herking (Sora). Karl Paryla directed another film version in 1956. Television versions were made in 1962 by Hans Hollmann and in 1972 by Wolfgang Liebeneiner.

== See also ==
- Der Bettelstudent
- Gräfin Dubarry
- Antonio Gasbarrone
