= The Beggar Student (1956 film) =

1956 film

- Directed by: Werner Jacobs
- Written by: F. Zell (libretto); Richard Genée (operetta); Fritz Böttger; Robert Gilbert (lyrics)
- Produced by: Günther Stapenhorst; Klaus Stapenhorst
- Starring: Gerhard Riedmann; Waltraut Haas; Elma Karlowa
- Cinematography: Ernst W. Kalinke; Heinz Schnackertz
- Edited by: Elisabeth Kleinert-Neumann
- Music by: Karl Millöcker (operetta); Bruno Uher
- Production company: Carlton Film
- Distributed by: Constantin Film
- Release date: 28 December 1956
- Running time: 95 minutes
- Country: West Germany
- Language: German

The Beggar Student (German: Der Bettelstudent) is a 1956 West German musical film directed by Werner Jacobs and starring Gerhard Riedmann, Waltraut Haas and Elma Karlowa. It is based on the operetta Der Bettelstudent by Karl Millöcker, and is part of the operetta film tradition. It was shot at the Bavaria Studios and the Carlton Studios in Munich. The film's sets were designed by the art director Felix Smetana.

== Synopsis ==
After a Polish aristocrat refuses to marry a Colonel, he manoeuvres to force her to marry a penniless student in revenge.

== Cast ==
- Gerhard Riedmann as Symon Rymanowicz
- Waltraut Haas as Komtesse Laura
- Elma Karlowa as Komtesse Bronislawa
- Gunther Philipp as Jan Janicki
- Gustav Knuth as Oberst Ollendorf
- Fita Benkhoff as Gräfin Palmatica
- Rudolf Vogel as Enterich
- Alice Kessler as Mira
- Ellen Kessler as Katja
- Dick Price as Graf Kaminsky
- Karl Lieffen as Major Wangenheim
- Joost Siedhoff as Leutnant Schweinitz
- Willem Holsboer
- Ulla Torp
- Johannes Buzalski
- Michael Friederichsen
- Adalbert Fuhlrott
- Peter Mühlen
