= Der lustige Krieg =

1881 operetta by Johann Strauss II

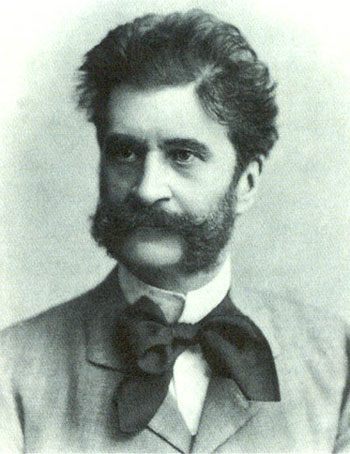
Johann Strauss II

Der lustige Krieg (The Merry War) is a three-act operetta composed by Johann Strauss II. The work was first performed on 25 November 1881 at the Theater an der Wien. Its libretto was by F. Zell (Camillo Walzel) and Richard Genée, based on the book for Henri Reber's 1857 opéra comique Les Dames capitaines. The operetta was well received at its premiere, and was performed 69 times during its first run.

== Roles ==
Roles, voice types, premiere cast
Role	Voice type	Premiere cast, 25 November 1881 Conductor: Johann Strauss II
Violetta, Countess Lomelli, a widow	soprano	Caroline Finaly
Artemisia, Princess of Massa-Carrara	soprano	Therese Braunecker-Schäfer
Else Groot	soprano	Rosa Streitmann
Balthasar Groot, her husband, a tulip merchant from Holland	baritone	Felix Schweighofer
Marchese Filippo Sebastiani	tenor	Alexander Girardi
Colonel Umberto Spinola	tenor	Ferdinand Schütz
Riccardo Durazzo	baritone	
Fortunato Franchetti	bass-baritone	
Biffi	tenor	
Pamfilio	baritone	
First lady	soprano	
Second lady	mezzo-soprano	Walburga "Wally" Eichheim
Third lady	contralto	
First commissioner	tenor	
Second commissioner	bass	
Colonel van Scheelen	spoken	
Officers and their wives, soldiers and people (chorus)

(Casaglia gives a different premiere cast: Rosa Streitmann as Artemisia, Ferdinand Schütz as Riccardo Durazzo, Felix Schweighofer as Fortunato Franchetti.)

== Synopsis ==
Place: The garrisoned Mediterranean city of Massa.
Time: First part of the 18th century

It concerns a dispute between two states. The 'war' between them is played out as a game of love between Colonel Umberto Spinola, the commander-in-chief of the Genoese army, and the widowed Countess Violetta. Despite the name of the operetta, there is no fighting or bloodshed in the 'war'.

== Recordings ==
- 1999: Eva Mei, Jorma Silvasti, Daphne Evangelatos, Jörg Schneider, Paul Armin Edelmann, Birgid Steinberger; Vienna Radio Symphony Orchestra, Wiener Jeunesse-Chor, Wiener Motettenchor; conductor: Ulf Schirmer; Label: ORF CD240
