= Shirley Dale =

British actress (1904–1988)

- Born: 2 September 1904; Fiji
- Died: 23 February 1988 (aged 83); New Haven
- Occupation: Actor
- Parent(s): Francis Richard Salisbury Baxendale

Shirley Dale (2 September 1904 – 23 February 1988) was a British actress born in Fiji.

Shirley Dale was born Marian Beatrice Baxendale on 2 September 1904 in Fiji, the daughter of Francis Baxendale, a commissioner in the British Colonial Service and amateur ornithologist, and his second wife Edith Fremlin Baxendale. She was raised in Cyprus.

Dale attended the Royal College of Music in London. She made her stage review at the Lyric Theatre as Jenny Diver in The Beggar's Opera.

Her other stage roles included Viola in Twelfth Night, Raina in Arms and the Man, Titania in A Midsummer Night's Dream, Imogen in Tantivy Towers, and Melisande in Debussy's Pelléas et Mélisande. She made her film debut as Tania in The Beggar Student.

Dale moved to Australia in 1932. She appeared productions of the J. C. Williamson's company, starring in the Australian musical comedy film The Hayseeds (1933) as Mary Townleigh and the stage musicals Music in the Air and Waltzes from Vienna. She married fellow actor John S. Moore in 1935.

The couple relocated to New York. Dale appeared on Broadway in Knights of Song (1938) at the 51st Street Theatre, a musical by Oscar Hammerstein II about the works of Gilbert and Sullivan. She appeared in a number of television roles, including in "Doctor Serocold" (1952), the second episode of the Hallmark Hall of Fame and "The Stolen Prince" (1949), an episode of Academy Theatre.

In 1953, the couple relocated to Bellmore, New York and opened Fairmeadow Nursery. They retired to Southbury, Connecticut in 1978.

Shirley Dale died on 23 February 1988 in New Haven, Connecticut.
