= Boccaccio (1940 film) =

1940 film

- Directed by: Marcello Albani
- Written by: Maria Basaglia; Luigi Bonelli; Max Calandri; Michele Galdieri; Filippo Masoero; Marcello Albani; Camillo Walzel (libretto); Richard Genée (libretto)
- Produced by: Ettore Presutti
- Starring: Clara Calamai; Osvaldo Valenti; Silvana Jachino; Luigi Almirante
- Cinematography: Massimo Terzano
- Edited by: Dolores Tamburini
- Music by: Tarcisio Fusco
- Production company: Scalera Film
- Distributed by: Scalera Film
- Release date: 22 September 1940
- Running time: 80 minutes
- Country: Italy
- Language: Italian

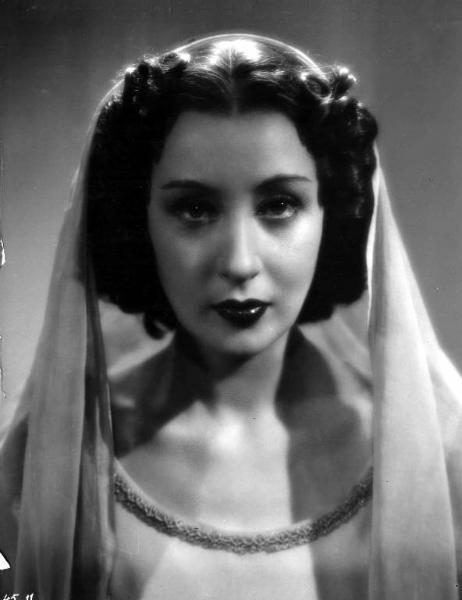
Actress Clara Calamai in a scene from the 1940 film "Boccaccio"

Boccaccio is a 1940 Italian operetta film directed by Marcello Albani and starring Clara Calamai, Osvaldo Valenti and Silvana Jachino. It is based on the 1879 operetta Boccaccio by Franz von Suppé. It was made at the Scalera Studios in Rome.

== Cast ==
- Clara Calamai as Giannina, falso Boccaccio
- Osvaldo Valenti as Berto
- Silvana Jachino as Fiammetta
- Luigi Almirante as Maestro Scalza
- Osvaldo Genazzani as Il principe di Parnormo
- Virgilio Riento as Il bottaro
- Anita Farra as Beatrice
- Bice Parisi as Peronella
- Nera Novella as Isabella
- Raffaele di Napoli as Il duca di Calabria
- Rudi Dal Pra as Leonetto
- Amilcare Pettinelli as Il Siniscalco
- Daniella Drei as Una ancella
- Gino Bianchi as Lambertuccio
- Dino De Laurentiis as Uno degli studenti con la penna

== Bibliography ==
- Goble, Alan. The Complete Index to Literary Sources in Film. Walter de Gruyter, 1999.
