= The Beggar Student (1931 British film) =

1931 British film by Victor Hanbury

- Theatrical release poster
- Directed by: Victor Hanbury; John Harvel
- Written by: John Stafford; Hans H. Zerlett; Camillo Walzel (libretto); Richard Genée (libretto)
- Produced by: John Harvel
- Starring: Shirley Dale; Lance Fairfax; Jerry Verno
- Music by: Horace Shepherd
- Production company: Amalgamated Films Associated
- Distributed by: British Lion
- Release date: December 1931
- Running time: 66 minutes
- Country: United Kingdom
- Language: English

The Beggar Student is a 1931 British operetta film directed by Victor Hanbury and John Harvel and starring Shirley Dale, Lance Fairfax and Jerry Verno. It was written by John Stafford|, Hans H. Zerlett, Camillo Walze and Richard Genée based on the 1882 operetta The Beggar Student by Carl Millöcker.

Der Bettelstudent, a separate German film based on the same operetta, was made the same year.

== Cast ==
- Shirley Dale as Tania
- Lance Fairfax as Carl Romaine
- Jerry Verno as Jan Janski
- Frederick Lloyd as Colonel Ollendorff
- Mark Daly as Sergeant
- Jill Hands as Broni
- Margaret Halstan as Countess Novalska
- Edward Ashley as Nicki

== Production ==
The film was made at Beaconsfield Studios as a quota quickie. The film's sets were designed by Norman G. Arnold.

== Reception ==
The Daily Film Renter wrote: "Another comedy musical of first-class calibre. Imaginatively produced, lavishly set, and acted admirably by personality players. Effervesces with tuneful melody. Most decidedly a 'popularity' attraction of consistent and all-round merit for any and every type of hall."

Kine Weekly wrote: "It moves easily, and romance and humour are effectively blended, but the producer has not quite succeeded in capturing the joyous Viennese atmosphere. The occasional flat spots, however, should not detract from the picture's appeal, and it should get over with the majority of audiences."
