= The Beggar Student (1927 film) =

1927 film

- Directed by: Jacob Fleck; Luise Fleck
- Written by: Walter Reisch; Camillo Walzel (libretto); Richard Genée (libretto)
- Starring: Harry Liedtke; Ida Wüst; Agnes Esterhazy
- Cinematography: Edoardo Lamberti; Guido Seeber
- Production company: Aafa-Film
- Distributed by: Aafa-Film
- Release date: 2 December 1927
- Running time: 105 minutes
- Country: Germany
- Languages: Silent; German intertitles

The Beggar Student (German: Der Bettelstudent) is a 1927 German silent film directed by Jacob Fleck and Luise Fleck and starring Harry Liedtke, Ida Wüst and Agnes Esterhazy. It is an adaptation of Carl Millöcker's operetta The Beggar Student. It was shot at the Staaken Studios in Berlin. The film's sets were designed by the art directors Botho Hoefer and Hans Minzloff.

== Cast ==
- Harry Liedtke as Simon, Student
- Ida Wüst as Gräfin Nowalska
- Agnes Esterhazy as Laura, ihre Tochter
- Maria Paudler as Bronislawa, ihre Tochter
- Hans Junkermann as Oberst Ollendorf
- Kurt Vespermann as Der Kornett
- Ernö Verebes as Jan, Student
- Hermann Picha as Enterich, Gendarm

== Bibliography ==
- Kopp, Kristin Leigh (2012). Germany's Wild East: Constructing Poland as Colonial Space. Ann Arbor: University of Michigan Press. ISBN 978-0-472-11844-1.
