= Nanon (1924 film) =

1924 film

- Italian poster
- Directed by: Hanns Schwarz
- Written by: Max Jungk; Julius Urgiß
- Starring: Agnes Esterhazy; Harry Liedtke; Hanni Weisse
- Cinematography: Julius Reinwald; Hans Scheib; Arpad Viragh
- Production company: Trianon-Film
- Distributed by: Landlicht-Filmverleih
- Release date: 1 February 1924
- Country: Germany
- Languages: Silent; German intertitles

Nanon is a 1924 German silent historical film directed by Hanns Schwarz and starring Agnes Esterhazy, Harry Liedtke, and Hanni Weisse. It is based on the operetta Nanon by Richard Genée with a libretto by F Zell. The film's sets were designed by the Hungarian art director Stefan Lhotka. The film was remade in 1938 as a sound film of the same name.

== Cast ==
- Agnes Esterhazy as Nanon
- Harry Liedtke as Marquis d'Aubigne
- Hanni Weisse as Ninon de l'Enclos
- Leopold von Ledebur as Louis XIV
- Julia Serda as Madame de Maintenon
- Hans Junkermann as Hofmarschall des Königs
- Hans Wassmann as Marquis de Marsillac
- Eugen Rex as Hector de Marsillac, sein Neffe
- Fritz Kampers as Frontenac, Offizier im Regiment Languedoc
- Carl Wilhelm Tetting as Chevalier Houlières, Durand
- Marga Rheis as junge Dame
- Harry Hardt as Bruder der Dame
- Hugo Döblin as Notar
- Margarete Kupfer as Jacqueline, Dienstmagd bei Nanon
- Jakob Tiedtke as Koch des Königs
- Otto Reinwald as Gaston, Page der Ninon
- Willi Allen as Mohr der Ninon

== Bibliography ==
- Goble, Alan (1999). The Complete Index to Literary Sources in Film. Berlin: Walter de Gruyter. ISBN 978-3-11-095194-3.
