= The Merry Wives of Windsor (1950 film) =

- Directed by: Georg Wildhagen
- Written by: Otto Nicolai (opera); Salomon Hermann Mosenthal (opera); William Shakespeare (play); Georg Wildhagen; Wolff von Gordon
- Starring: Sonja Ziemann; Camilla Spira; Paul Esser; Ina Halley
- Cinematography: Eugen Klagemann; Karl Plintzner
- Music by: Otto Nicolai (opera)
- Production company: DEFA
- Distributed by: Progress Film
- Release date: 22 October 1950
- Running time: 96 minutes
- Country: East Germany
- Language: German

The Merry Wives of Windsor (German: Die lustigen Weiber von Windsor) is a 1950 East German musical comedy film directed by Georg Wildhagen. It was based on William Shakespeare's play by the same name.

== Plot ==
In Elizabethan England, Sir John Falstaff is embroiled in attempting to have a love affair with several women, which soon turns into a humorous adventure.

== Cast ==
- Sonja Ziemann as Mrs. Fluth
- Camilla Spira as Mrs. Gretchen Reich
- Paul Esser as Sir John Falstaff
- Ina Halley as Anna Reich
- Eckart Dux as Fenton
- Alexander Engel as Innkeeper Reich
- Claus Holm as Mr. Fluth
- Joachim Teege as Mr. Spärlich
- Gerd Frickhöffer as Dr. Cajus
- Rita Streich as Mrs. Fluth (singing voice)
- Martha Mödl as Mrs. Gretchen Reich (singing voice)
- Sonja Schöner as Anna Reich (singing voice)
- Helmut Krebs as Fenton (voice)
- Hans Kramer as Sir John Falstaff (voice)
- Willi Heyer-Kraemer as Innkeeper Reich (singing voice)
- Herbert Brauer as Mr. Fluth (singing voice)

== Production ==
The film is an adaptation of the 1849 opera The Merry Wives of Windsor composed by Otto Nicolai with a libretto by Salomon Hermann Mosenthal which was based on William Shakespeare's play of the same title. It was made by the state-owned DEFA studio on a large budget.

== Reception ==
The film was highly successful by East German standards, and drew 6,090,329 viewers to the cinemas. Ernst Richter noted that while "the socially critical tone was unmistakably present in the film", it was free of "heavy-handed communist propaganda." Heinz Kersten characterized it as one of the last apolitical entertainment pictures produced by DEFA before the Socialist Unity Party of Germany tightened its control on the national film industry. Albert Wilkening wrote it was "a significant step forward in making movies in the GDR... Wildhagen's directing was quite skillful."

== Bibliography ==
- Sabine Hake, John Davidson (editors). Framing the Fifties: Cinema in a Divided Germany. Berghahn Books (2007). ISBN 978-1-84545-204-9.
- Ernst Richert. Agitation und Propaganda : das System der publizistischen Massenführung in der Sowjetzone. Institut für politische Wissenschaft (1958). OCLC 185953805.
- Heinz Kersten. Das Filmwesen in der Sowjetischen Besatzungszone Deutschlands. Bundesministerium für Gesamtdeutsche Fragen (1963). ASIN B0000BK48Q.
- Albert Wilkening. Film. VEB Bibliographisches Institut (1966). OCLC 7216389.
