= The Beggar Student (1936 film) =

1936 film

- Directed by: Georg Jacoby
- Written by: Lotte Neumann; Walter Wassermann; Camillo Walzel (libretto); Richard Genée (libretto)
- Produced by: Max Pfeiffer
- Starring: Johannes Heesters; Marika Rökk; Fritz Kampers
- Cinematography: Ewald Daub
- Edited by: Herbert B. Fredersdorf
- Music by: Alois Melichar
- Production company: Döring-Film
- Distributed by: UFA
- Release date: 7 August 1936
- Running time: 95 minutes
- Country: Nazi Germany
- Language: German

The Beggar Student (German: Der Bettelstudent) is a 1936 German operetta film directed by Georg Jacoby and starring Fritz Kampers, Harry Hardt and Ida Wüst. It is an adaptation of the 1882 operetta Der Bettelstudent by Carl Millöcker. It was shot at the Babelsberg Studios of UFA in Potsdam. The film's sets were designed by the art directors Fritz Maurischat and Karl Weber.

== Plot ==
Poland in 1704: The country is ruled by the Saxon Elector August the Strong, who appointed Colonel Ollendorf as governor in Kraków. The region is under martial law, nocturnal gatherings are prohibited. Ollendorf gives a ball, to which the impoverished Countess Nowalska and her two daughters Bronislawa and Laura are also invited. As always, Bronislawa is only interested in eating and dancing, which embarrasses the Countess. Laura, however, is swarmed by the men. Ollendorf also wants to dance with Laura, who eludes him. When he continues to press her and kisses her on the shoulder, Laura slaps him in the face because he is not befitting his status and is not a Pole either. He laughs about it, but secretly swears revenge.

Meanwhile, in Kraków, a mysterious man has appeared who is being hunted by the soldiers. The Pole Jan Janicki gives him shelter. The stranger introduces himself as Symon Rymanowicz. They soon realize that both of them care about the freedom of Poland, so Jan takes Symon to a gathering of loyal Poles who are planning the revolution. When the secret gathering is broken up by soldiers, Jan and Symon flee in a wagon that turns out to be the prison's supply wagon and is parked in the prison yard. Jan and Symon, who pretend to be beggar students, are arrested and sing the satirical song "Oh, I just kissed her on the shoulder" in prison for Colonel Ollendorf. He goes to see him in prison and offers both of them a deal: they will help him with a masquerade and in return they will both be set free. The men agree.

Symon now becomes the rich world traveler Prince Wybicki and Jan pretends to be his secretary. According to Ollendorf's plan, Symon is to get engaged to Laura and afterwards reveal himself as a beggar student, making her look like a fool. However, Symon and Laura fall in love with each other and Bronislawa and Jan also become a couple. Jan promises Ollendorf that he will unmask an important revolutionary in return for a large sum of money. Jan uses the money that Ollendorf pays him to arm the revolutionaries. Symon and Laura's engagement takes place and Ollendorf triumphantly resolves the identities of Symon and Jan. However, both reveal that they are actually Duke Kasimir and Count Opalinski - the Nowalska sisters have married befitting their status. At the same time, the armed Poles storm Ollendorf's palace, and Elector August informs him that he is going to renounce the Polish crown. At the same time, Symon/Duke Kasimir is informed by the rebel leader that he will accept the royal crown. Poland is free and the Nowalska sisters have found their great love in Symon and Jan.

== Cast ==
- Fritz Kampers as Ollendorf, Oberst und Kommandant von Krakau
- Harry Hardt as Der Rittmeister, sein Adjutant
- Ida Wüst as Palmatica Gräfin Nowalska
- Carola Höhn as Ihre Tochter: Laura
- Marika Rökk as Ihre Tochter: Bronislawa
- Berthold Ebbecke as Jan Janicky
- Johannes Heesters as Simon Rymanowics
- Ernst Behmer as Enterich, Gefängniswärter
- Hans Joachim Schaufuß as Der Fähnrich
- Wilhelm Bendow as Der Friseur
- Gerhard Bienert as Kinsky, Tierbudenbesitzer
- Karl Platen as Stefan, Diener der Gräfin
- Paul Schwed as Ein Korporal
- Reinhold Bernt as Der Pedell
- Oskar Eigner
- Herbert Ebel
- Carl Iban
- Ernst Rennspies
- Paul Schäfer
- Max Vierlinger
- Karl Wagner
- Frank Winkler

== Bibliography ==
- Hake, Sabine (2001). Popular Cinema of the Third Reich. Austin: University of Texas Press. ISBN 978-0-292-73458-6.
