= F. Curtis Canfield =

Fayette Curtis Canfield
- Born: July 29, 1903; Bridgeport, Connecticut
- Died: June 8, 1986 (aged 82); Northampton, Massachusetts
- Education: Amherst College

Fayette Curtis Canfield (July 29, 1903 – June 8, 1986) was an American theater director, drama professor, and the first dean of the Yale School of Drama.

== Career ==
A member of the 1925 class of Amherst College, Canfield took a teaching job there in 1927, eventually becoming Stanley King Professor of dramatic arts and, from 1938, director of the college's Kirby Memorial Theater. In 1954, he was appointed as the first dean of the Yale School of Drama, remaining there until 1967. At Yale, he produced the premieres of several major plays, including Archibald MacLeish's Pulitzer-winning J.B., (which was chosen by the U.S. State Department to represent American university theater at the 1958 Brussels World's Fair) and staged revivals at Yale and off-Broadway, such as Stephen Vincent Benét's dramatic poem, John Brown's Body. He left Yale in 1967 to teach at the University of Pittsburgh, where he stayed until his retirement in 1973.

Canfield's career is distinguished by many factors. His expertise on emerging 20th century Irish drama led to the publication of several editions of essays and plays, including Plays of the Irish Renaissance, 1880-1930 and Plays of Changing Ireland, and his analytical approach to play direction prompted the publication of The Craft of Play Directing. Unusually for a professor of his era, his love of theater led him to accept regular professional directing work in summers and on sabbatical while maintaining a full academic career. Among other assignments, he directed the 1949 WNBW production of Julius Caesar produced by his Amherst Masquers to open the Folger Shakespeare Library Theater in Washington, D.C. From July to September 1949, as a pioneer in the live direction of television drama, he produced a series of eight live half-hour dramas on NBC, featuring actors in short plays by Thornton Wilder and Edna St. Vincent Millay. He produced live TV performances of Hedda Gabler, Richard III, Othello, The Rivals and Uncle Vanya.

== Personal life ==
Canfield was born on July 29, 1903, in Bridgeport, Connecticut. On May 21, 1927, he married Katherine F. Newbold. Upon retiring he returned to live in Amherst. He died at the Cooley Dickinson Hospital in Northampton, Massachusetts, on June 8, 1986.

== Bibliography ==
- Canfield, F. Curtis, Plays of Changing Ireland, The Macmillan Company; First edition 1936, ASIN B000IBA1D2
- Canfield, ed. Plays of the Irish Renaissance, 1880-1930, Ayer Co Pub, June 1974, ISBN 0836982487
- Canfield, The Craft of Play Directing Holt, Rinehart & Winston, 1963, ASIN B000O91ZW4
- Canfield, The Seed and the Sowers: A Chronicle of the Founding of Amherst College, Amherst College, 1955, ASIN B00AVPB49K
