= Nanon (1938 film) =

1938 film

- Directed by: Herbert Maisch
- Written by: F Zell; Richard Genée; Georg Zoch; Eberhard Keindorff
- Produced by: Max Pfeiffer
- Starring: Erna Sack; Johannes Heesters; Dagny Servaes
- Cinematography: Konstantin Irmen-Tschet
- Edited by: Carl Otto Bartning
- Music by: Alois Melichar
- Production company: UFA
- Distributed by: UFA
- Release date: 15 November 1938
- Running time: 83 minutes
- Country: Germany
- Language: German

Nanon is a 1938 German historical film directed by Herbert Maisch and starring Erna Sack, Johannes Heesters and Dagny Servaes. It is based on the original 1877 operetta Nanon by Richard Genée which had a libretto by F Zell, although the music for this film was specially commissioned from Alois Melichar.

It was produced by major German studio UFA, and is part of a cycle of operetta films made during the 1930s. The film's sets were designed by the art director Erich Kettelhut.

It was a remake of the 1924 silent film of the same title.

== Plot ==
At the court of Louis XIV, Nanon, a singer and the landlady of the inn “Zum Goldenen Lamm,” is known for resisting the advances of men. Marquis Charles d’Aubigné wagers with his friends that he will be the first to kiss her. Disguising himself as a drummer named Grignon, he gains her trust, and Nanon falls in love with him.

Nanon arranges a surprise wedding and has the banns and the priest ready. Charles, who had only meant to win the bet, is horrified. Just before the vows, his friends stage a fake arrest for illegal dueling—a crime punishable by death under the king’s edict. Desperate, Nanon goes to Paris with the playwright Molière to beg Louis XIV for a pardon.

During a theatrical performance she gets the king to sign a blank pardon. She then learns that Grignon was never imprisoned and is in fact the nobleman who was only playing a game with her. At a garden party she finds Charles exposing Hector, the police prefect’s nephew, who had stolen a song Charles wrote for Nanon and passed it off as his own to court the wealthy Ninon de l’Enclos. Nanon joins in the song; Charles’s friends mock her. When Hector insults her, Charles challenges him to a real duel. Both men are arrested.

Nanon returns to her inn, finished with the men. Molière brings word that Charles is now truly condemned to death. She goes back to Paris and frees him with the royal pardon. The king, tired of Charles’s escapades, orders him to marry an unknown Countess Delicat that same evening. Realizing he loves Nanon, Charles flees with her toward the border, is caught, and is brought before the king. The bride the king has chosen is Nanon herself, raised in rank and presented to him. They embrace; the king enjoys his successful trick, and Molière remarks that the comedy might almost have been his own.

The film ends with the marriage and the suggestion that the whole tangle has also given Molière the material for a new piece.

== Cast ==
- Erna Sack as Nanon Patin
- Johannes Heesters as Marquis Charles d'Aubigne
- Dagny Servaes as Ninon de l'Enclos
- Kurt Meisel as Hector
- Otto Gebühr as Jean Baptiste Molière
- Oskar Sima as Marquis de Marsillac
- Karl Paryla as Louis XIV
- Berthold Ebbecke as Pierre
- Ursula Deinert as Tänzerin
- Clemens Hasse as Francois Patin
- Paul Westermeier as 1. Korporal
- Armin Schweizer as 2. Korporal
- Oskar Höcker as 3. Korporal
- Ilse Fürstenberg as Die Magd
- Ludwig Andersen as Sekretär
- Walter Steinbeck as Mons. Louvois
- Hermann Pfeiffer as Mons. Duval
- Horst Birr
- Lucie Euler
- Angelo Ferrari as Gast bei Ninon
- Eric Harden
- Alice Hechy
- Max Hiller
- Willy Kaiser-Heyl
- Hermann Meyer-Falkow
- Ellen Plessow
- Klaus Pohl
- Walter Schenk
- Erhart Stettner
- Robert Vincenti-Lieffertz
- Egon Vogel
- Leopold von Ledebur
- Wolfgang von Schwindt
- Helmut Weiss as Verehrer von Gräfin Ninon de Lenclos
- Herbert Weissbach

== Bibliography ==
- Goble, Alan (1999). The Complete Index to Literary Sources in Film. Walter de Gruyter. ISBN 978-3-11-095194-3.
