= Nanon (opera) =

1877 operetta by Richard Genée

Nanon is an operetta by Richard Genée. The libretto was freely adapted from Nanon, Ninon et Maintenon, of Emmanuel Théaulon and Armand d'Artois by F. Zell and R. Genee. 10 March 1877 at the Theater an der Wien in Vienna.

== Recording ==
Sonja Schöner, Heinz Hoppe, Kurt Marschner, Orchester des Nordwestdeutschen Rundfunks Hamburg, Richard Müller-Lamperts / 1955
