= Boccaccio (operetta) =

Operetta in three acts by Franz von Suppé

- Operetta by Franz von Suppé
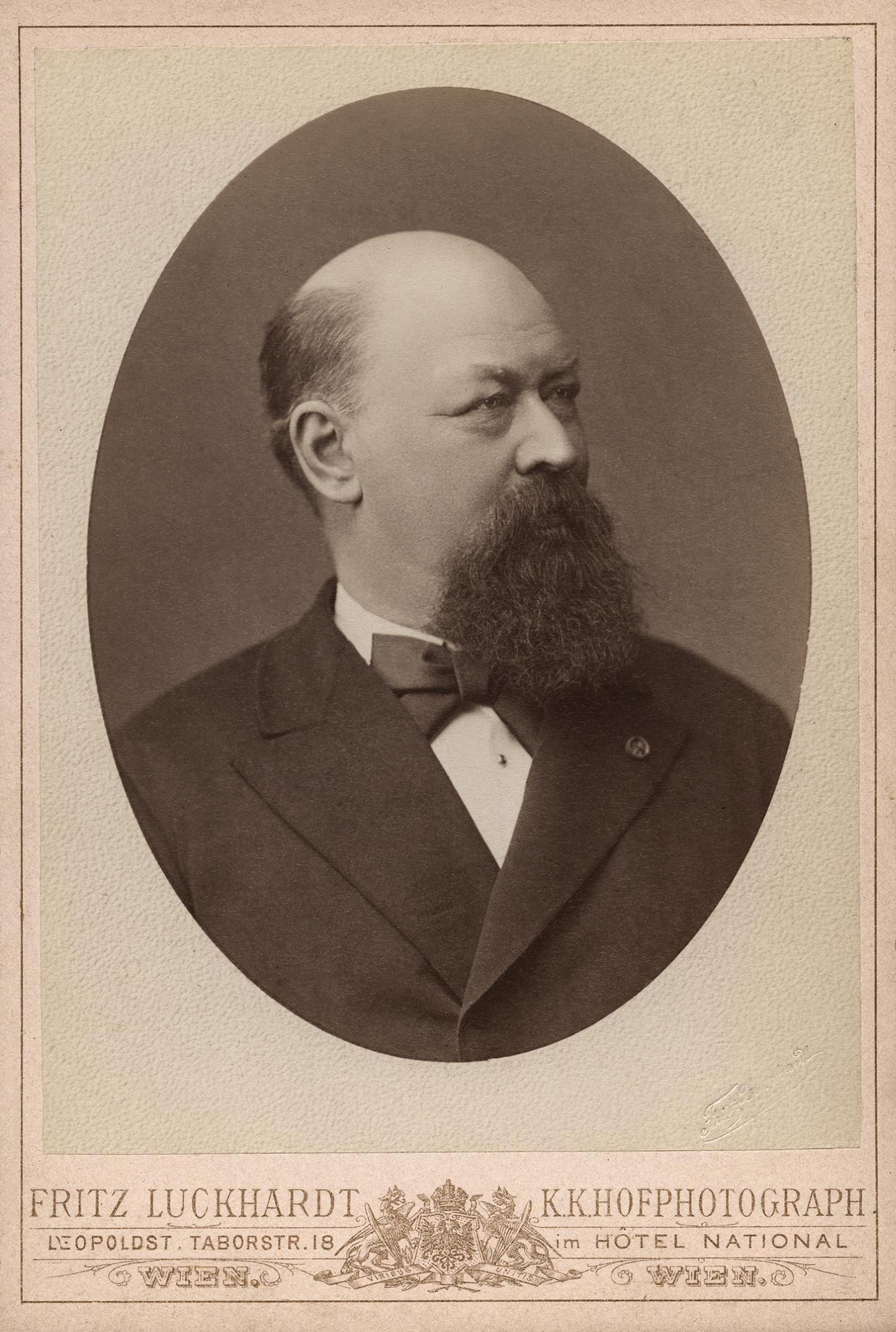
- The composer of the operetta, c. 1885
- Native title: Boccaccio, oder Der Prinz von Palermo
- Translation: Boccaccio, or the Prince of Palermo
- Librettist: Camillo Walzel; Richard Genée; Heinrich von Littrow
- Language: German
- Premiere: 1 February 1879; Carltheater, Vienna

Boccaccio, oder Der Prinz von Palermo (Boccaccio, or the Prince of Palermo) is an operetta in three acts by Franz von Suppé to a German libretto by Camillo Walzel and Richard Genée, based on the play by Jean-François Bayard, Adolphe de Leuven, Léon Lévy Brunswick and Arthur de Beauplan, based in turn on The Decameron by Giovanni Boccaccio. Despite the opera's clear links to the Viennese opera tradition, Suppé's opera takes most of its style from Italian opera.

The opera was begun somewhere around the fall of 1878 and first published in 1879 by the August Cranz company and performed at the Carltheater, Vienna, on 1 February 1879. An English translation and adaptation was completed in 1880 by Dexter Smith and later by Oscar Weil and Gustav Hinrichs around 1883. The first contemporary edit of the work occurred in 1950 for the premiere of the work at the Metropolitan Opera in New York City, with several more iterations occurring through the 20th century.

In 1940, Boccaccio was made into a film by American-born Italian film director Marcello Albani.

== Performance history ==
Following its premiere in 1879, the opera quickly made its way around the globe.

- 23 April 1880: New York
- 3 February 1882: Brussels, Belgium (based on translation by Gustave Lagye)
- 12 Decembert 1882: Madrid, Spain (Teatro de la Zarzuela), translated to Spanish
- 29 March 1883: Paris, France (Théâtre des Folies-Dramatiques)
- 1 May 1882 to 1929: Parma, Italy (Teatro Reinach)
- 16 September 1882: Vienna, Austria (Theater an der Wien)
- 1882: London, United Kingdom (Comedy Theatre)
- 2 September 188(3 or 4): Melbourne, Australia
- 26 December 1884: Brno, Czech Republic
- 11 October 1886: Manaus, Amazonos (Éden-Theatro)
- 5 July 1889: Vienna, Austria (Venedig in Wien)
- 1897: Manaus, Amazonos (Amazonas Theater)
- 1898: Rome, Italy (Costanzi Theater, based on translation by Gian Luigi Bonelli)
- 1905: (Broadway ft. Raymond Hitchcock)
- 1922: Venice, Italy (La Fenice)
- 1931: Metropolitan Opera House, New York (ft. Maria Jeritza)
- 1932 - 1953: Vienna, Austria (Wiener Staatsoper ft. Maria Jeritza)
- 1935: Turin, Italy (Teatro Regio, conducted by Franco Ghione ft. Iris Adami Corradetti)
- 1950, 1958, 1973: Berlin, Germany (Metropoltheater)
- 1951: Vienna, Austria (Burgtheater)
- 1956: Munich, Germany (Gärtnerplatztheater)
- 1970: Florence, Italy (Teatro Comunale di Firenze ft. Fedora Barbieri, Alvinio Misciano, and Mario Petri)
- 1976: Bordeaux, France (Grand Théâtre de Bordeaux)
- 2015/2016: Hildesheim, Germany (Theater für Niedersachsen)

== Roles and role creators ==
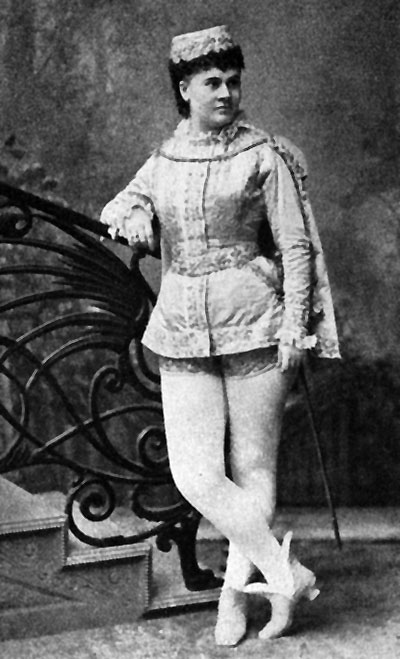
Carolina Östberg in the trouser role of Boccaccio

Roles, voice types, premiere cast
| Role | Voice type | Premiere cast, 1 February 1879 |
|---|---|---|
| Fiametta, Lambertuccio's foster-daughter | soprano | Rosa Streitmann |
| Giovanni Boccaccio, novelist and poet | mezzo-soprano | Antonie Link |
| Beatrice, Lambertuccio's wife | soprano | |
| Isabella, Lotteringhi's wife | mezzo-soprano | |
| Peronella | contralto | |
| Pietro, Prince of Palermo | tenor | |
| Lambertuccio, the grocer | baritone | |
| Lotteringhi, the cooper | baritone | Franz Tewele |
| Scalza, the barber | baritone | |
| Leonello, Boccaccio's student friend | baritone | |
| Checco, a beggar | bass | Carl Blasel |
| Fratelli, the bookseller | baritone | |
| Majordomo | baritone | |
Beggars, students, servants, Donna Pulci's daughters – chorus

== Synopsis ==
Time: 1331.
Place: Florence.

In early-Renaissance Florence, the erotic novellas of the poet Boccaccio cause a stir and the locals are divided into the female fans of his scandalous tales and their jealous husbands. A plot is hatched by the husbands to chase Boccaccio from the city and have him locked up. But Boccaccio has other plans, including one to win the hand of the Duke's daughter Fiammetta, which he finally succeeds in doing after finding favour with the Duke.

== Musical numbers ==
- "Ich sehe einen jungen Mann dort stehn" (Boccaccio)
- "Hab' ich nur deine Liebe" (Fiametta, later with Boccaccio)
- Act 1 finale (book-burning)
- Serenade (Boccaccio, Pietro, Leonetto)
- Cooper's Song (Lotteringhi)
- Waltz trio "Wie pocht mein Herz so ungestüm" (Fiametta, Isabella, Peronella)
- Lovers' sextet
- Duet "Florenz hat schöne Frauen (Mia bella florentina)" (Fiametta, Boccaccio)
- Act 3 finale (Boccaccio's counsel)
