= The Beggar Student (1931 German film) =

1931 film

- German film poster
- German: Der Bettelstudent
- Directed by: Victor Janson
- Written by: Camillo Walzel (libretto); Richard Genée (libretto); Hans H. Zerlett
- Produced by: Gabriel Levy
- Starring: Hans-Heinz Bollzmann; Jarmila Novotná; Fritz Schulz
- Cinematography: Guido Seeber
- Edited by: Ladislao Vajda
- Music by: Felix Günther
- Production company: Aafa-Film
- Distributed by: Aafa-Film
- Release date: 3 February 1931
- Running time: 92 minutes
- Country: Germany
- Language: German

The Beggar Student (German: Der Bettelstudent) is a 1931 German operetta film directed by Victor Janson and starring Hans-Heinz Bollmann, Jarmila Novotná and Fritz Schulz. The film is based on the 1882 operetta The Beggar Student. A British version of the film The Beggar Student was also released the same year.

The film's art direction was by Botho Hoefer and Bernhard Schwidewski.

== Cast ==
- Hans-Heinz Bollmann as Symon
- Jarmila Novotná as Laura
- Fritz Schulz as Jan
- Truus van Aalten as Bronislava
- Hansi Arnstaedt as Gräfin Palmatica Nowalska
- Paul Westermeier as Oberst Ollendorf
- Hans Jaray as Henrici
- Hermann Picha as Enterich
- Paul Biensfeldt as Nepomuk
