= Herbert Maisch =

German director (1890–1974)

- Born: 10 December 1890; Nurtingen, German Empire
- Died: 10 October 1974 (aged 83); Cologne, West Germany
- Occupation: Film director
- Years active: 1935–1944

Herbert Maisch (born 10 December 1890 – in Nürtingen, Württemberg, died 10 October 1974 in Köln) was a German film director.

== Selected filmography ==
- The Royal Waltz (1935)
- Boccaccio (1936)
- Love's Awakening (1936)
- Men Without a Fatherland (1937)
- Nights in Andalusia (1938)
- Nanon (1938)
- D III 88 (1939)
- Andreas Schlüter (1942)
- Music in Salzburg (1944)
