= Der Bettelstudent =

Operetta in three acts by Carl Millöcker

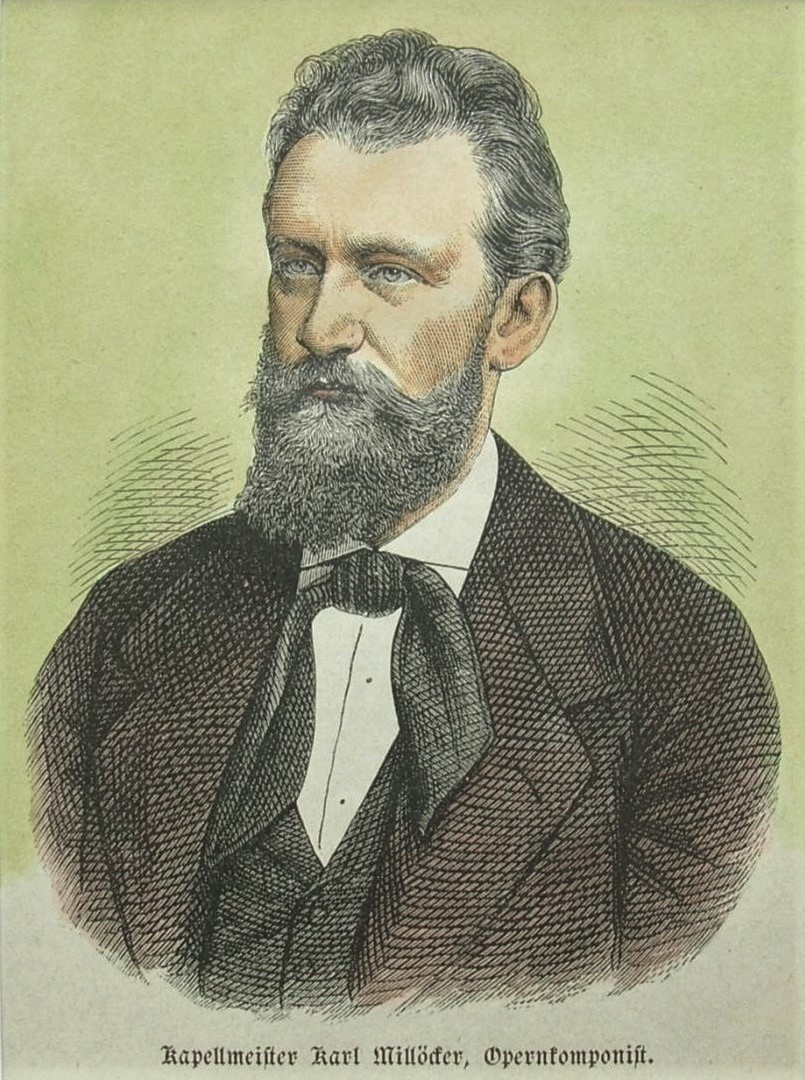
Carl Millöcker (1883)

Der Bettelstudent (The Beggar Student) is an operetta in three acts by Carl Millöcker with a German libretto by Camillo Walzel (under the pseudonym of F. Zell) and Richard Genée, based on Les noces de Fernande by Victorien Sardou and The Lady of Lyons by Edward Bulwer-Lytton. However, the librettists added the element of combining love and politics to the French comedy plots. It premiered in Vienna in 1882.

== Performance history ==
The work was performed first at the Theater an der Wien, Vienna, on 6 December 1882. It was a success and allowed Millöcker to retire from conducting. Johann Strauss II rejected the libretto in favor of A Night in Venice, but Millöcker's work turned out to be an enduringly popular operetta, with over 5,000 productions.

The piece played at the Thalia Theatre in New York City in 1883 and then in English at the Casino Theatre in 1883. It was revived in New York at least three times: in 1898 and 1899 at the Thalia Theatre, and in 1913 at the Casino Theatre. It was also performed in London at the Alhambra Theatre in 1884, in a four-act version.

The operetta has been filmed several times; as a silent film (1927) and simultaneously in German and in English (1931). A 1936 German film adaptation was directed by Georg Jacoby, and a 1956 West German film adaptation was directed by Werner Jacobs. Mazurka der Liebe from 1957 was produced in East Germany. It has also been performed on German television.

Recent productions in English include Ohio Light Opera (1996), and Light Opera Works (1991).

== Roles ==
Roles, voice types, premiere cast
Role	Voice type	Premiere cast, 6 December 1882 Conductor: Carl Millöcker
Colonel Ollendorf, Commander of Krakow	bass	Felix Schweighofer
Symon Rymanowicz, (Note: Sometimes called S. Symonovicz) the beggar student	tenor	Alexander Girardi
Jan Janicki, a student	tenor	Josef Josephi
Enterich, a jailer	baritone	Carl Adolf Friese
Piffke, warden	tenor	
Puffke, warden	tenor	
Richthofen	tenor	
Palmatica, Countess Nowalska	mezzo-soprano	Therese Braunecker-Schäfer
Laura Nowalska, Palmatica's daughter	soprano	Caroline Finaly
Bronislava, Palmatica's daughter	soprano	Lore Jona
Onuphrie, Palmatica's servant	bass	
Count Bogumil Malachowski, (Note: Sometimes called Felinski) Palmatica's cousin	bass	Alexander Guttmann
Eva, wife of Bogumil	mezzo-soprano	Lore Jona
Major von Wangenheim	tenor	
Lieutenant von Schweinitz	bass	Franz Eppich
Captain Henrici	bass	
Prisoners and their wives, soldiers, wedding guests chorus

== Synopsis ==
Place: Kraków, Poland
Time: 1704

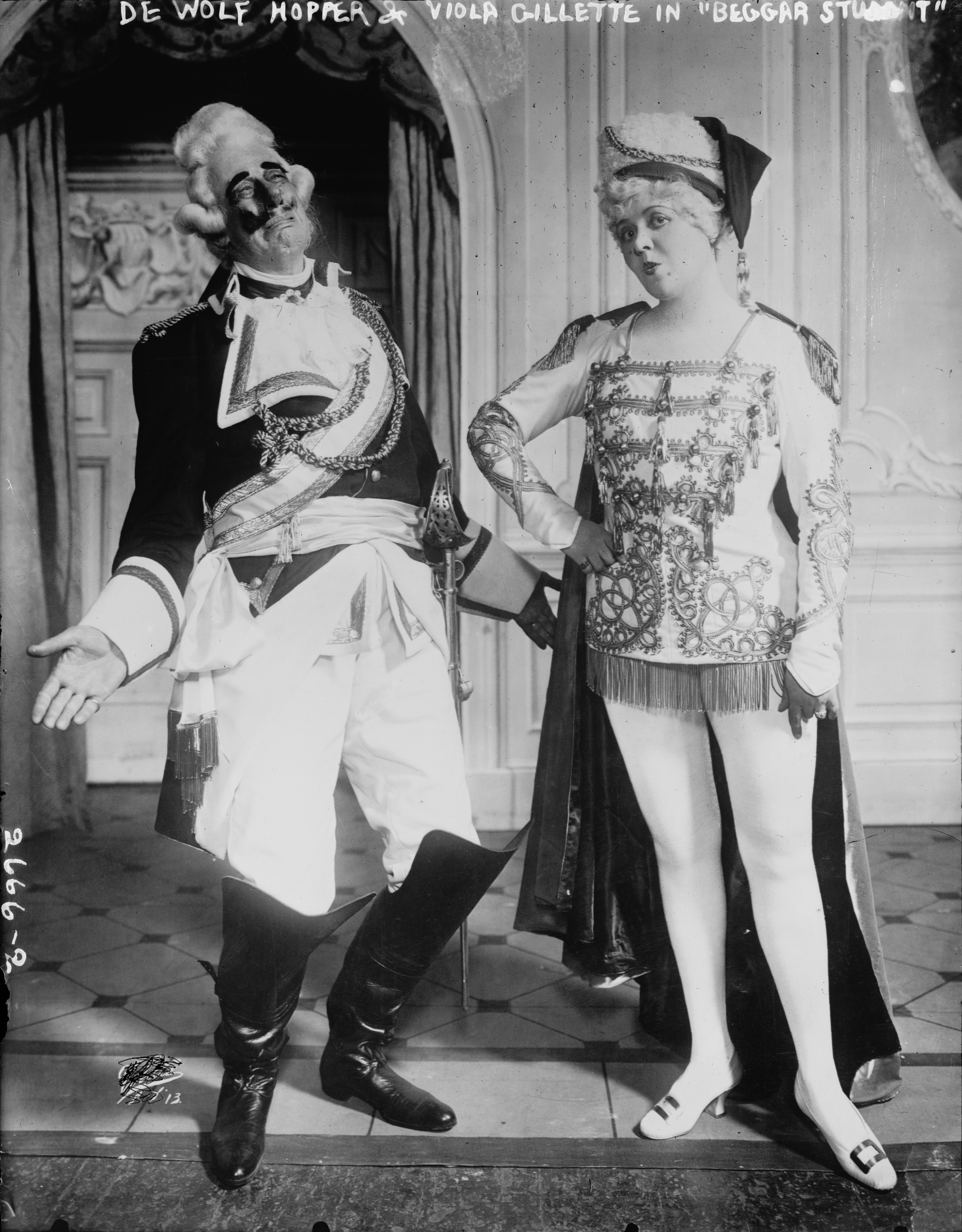
DeWolf Hopper & Viola Gillette in The Beggar Student

=== Act 1 ===
Colonel Ollendorf seeks revenge against Laura Nowalska, who rebuffed him with her fan, offended by his advances. Laura's mother declares that only a Pole and nobleman can be her son-in-law. He releases a seemingly penniless student and his friend (Symon and Janicki) to pose as a millionaire and his aide, to entice the bankrupt but venerable Nowalska family. Laura agrees to marry Symon, and Janicki falls in love with Laura's sister.

=== Act 2 ===
The money that the colonel supplied to Symon is just about gone and he is no longer able to keep up the appearance of nobility. He and Laura have developed genuine feelings for each other and he struggles with the decision to tell her the truth. He writes a letter confessing the ruse. The colonel senses that the letter will end the plot, and convinces Laura's mother not to open it. When the wedding ceremony is over, the colonel reveals the truth about Symon, who is subsequently driven from the palace.

=== Act 3 ===
Symon is contemplating suicide, when his friend Janicki reveals that he is a Polish officer and is part of a group of patriots who are planning to capture the citadel and to reinstate King Stanislaus. The Governor-General discovers that Janicki knows the whereabouts of the Polish grand duke and bribes him with 200,000 thalers to reveal his location to the Austrians. Janicki asks Symon to impersonate the grand duke until the money for his capture can be paid. The plot succeeds. In return, he is knighted by King Stanislaus and accepted by his wife and mother-in-law.

== Musical numbers ==
Act 1

- "Ach unsre Lieben sperrte man ein": Introduction – Chorus
- "Und da soll man noch galant sein – Ach ich hab' sie ja nur auf die Schulter geküßt": Ollendorf (the "Kiss on the Shoulder" waltz)
- "Die Welt hat das genialste Streben": Entrance duet – Symon – Jan – Chorus
- "O Juchheissa, hurra! Die Messe beginnt": Chorus and ensemble
- "Einkäufe machen sollten wir eigentlich": Entrance trio – Laura – Bronislawa – Palmatica
- "Das ist der Fürst Wybicki"
- "Bravo! Bravo! Es geht ganz famos"
- "Ich knüpfte manche zarte Bande": Ensemble and song – Ollendorf – Laura – Bronislawa – Symon – Jan – Palmatica – Chorus
- "Du bist die Seine? – Höchste Lust und tiefstes Leid – Bei solchem Feste": Finale act 1 – Palmatica – Laura – Symon – Bronislawa – Ollendorf – Jan – Enterich – Chorus

Act 2

- "O einen Mann hat sie (hab' ich) gefunden": Trio – Palmatica – Bronislawa – Laura
- "O durch diesen Kuß sei unser Bund geweiht!": Duet – Jan – Bronislawa
- "Soll ich reden, darf ich schweigen? – Ich setz' den Fall": Duet – Symon – Laura
- "Glückliche Braut! Dir strahlet hell das Leben": Ensemble – Symon – Ollendorf – Palmatica – Jan – Laura – Chorus
- "Mit Geld und guten Worten": Couplet – Ollendorf
- "Klinget, Feierglocken, klinget!"
- "Trinkt uns zu, trinkt uns zu"
- Tempo di Mazur
- "Heidahi, heidaha! Sind wer och nich invidiert..."
- "Ach, ich hab' sie ja nur auf die Schulter geküßt": Finale act 2 – Ollendorf – Symon – Enterich – Laura – Bronislawa – Palmatica – Jan – Chorus

Act 3

- "Lumpen, Bagage, Bettelstudent!"
- "Der Fürst soll nur ein Bettler sein": Introduction – Bronislawa – Chorus
- "Ich hab' kein Geld, bin vogelfrei": Couplet – Symon
- "Still, man kommt! – Dort steht der Patron!"
- "Die halbe Stunde ist vorbei"
- "Jetzt lach' ich jeglicher Gefahr": Ensemble – Ollendorf – Palmatica – Symon – Jan – Laura – Bronislawa – Chorus
- "Befreit das Land! Geknüpft das Band!": Finale act 3 – Symon – Laura – Bronislawa – Jan – Palmatica – Chorus

== Recordings ==
- 1955: Conductor Anton Paulik, Volksoper Chorus and Orchestra, Kurt Preger, Eberhard Waechter, Rosette Anday, Wilma Lipp and Esther Réthy.

== See also ==
- Gasparone
- Gräfin Dubarry
