= Marcello Albani =

American-born Italian screenwriter, producer and film director

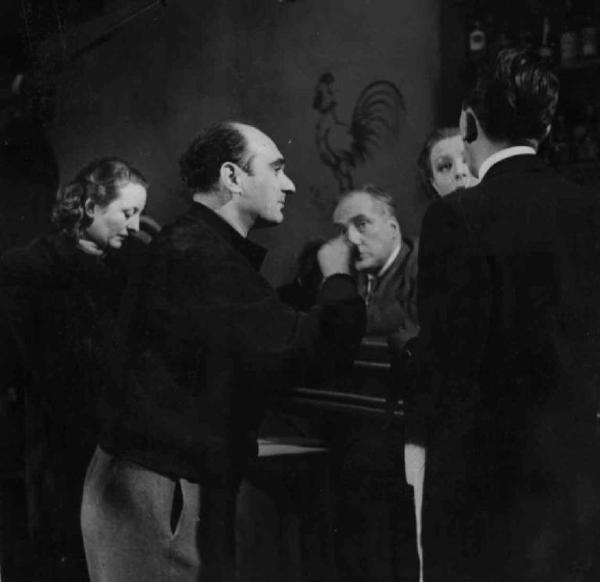
- Marcello Albani gives directions to the actors during the filming of the movie The Bazaar of Ideas (1940)
- Born: 3 May 1905; New York City, New York; United States
- Died: 1980 (aged 74–75); São Paulo, Brazil
- Occupations: Director; Producer; Screenwriter
- Years active: 1936–1958

Marcello Albani (1905–1980) was an American-born Italian screenwriter, producer and film director. He is particularly noted for his 1943 film Redemption which glorified the rise to power of the Fascist Party in the 1920s, but was disliked by the Fascist film chief Luigi Freddi who thought it was too overtly propagandistic.

== Selected filmography ==
=== Director ===
- Boccaccio (1940)
- Redemption (1943)

=== Screenwriter ===
- White Amazons (1936)

== Bibliography ==
- Gundle, Stephen. Mussolini's Dream Factory: Film Stardom in Fascist Italy. Berghan Books, 2013.
