= Georg Wildhagen =

German screenwriter and film director

Georg Wildhagen (15 September 1920 – 2 December 1990) was a German screenwriter and film director. According to conflicting sources, he was born in either Hannover or in Hamburg.

== Selected filmography ==
- The Marriage of Figaro (1949)
- The Dubarry (1951)
- The Merry Wives of Windsor (1950)
- A Night in Venice (1953)
- Wedding Bells (1954)

== Bibliography ==
- Davidson, John & Hake, Sabine. Take Two: Fifties Cinema in Divided Germany. Berghahn Books, 2007.
