= Carl Millöcker =

Austrian composer and conductor (1842–1899)

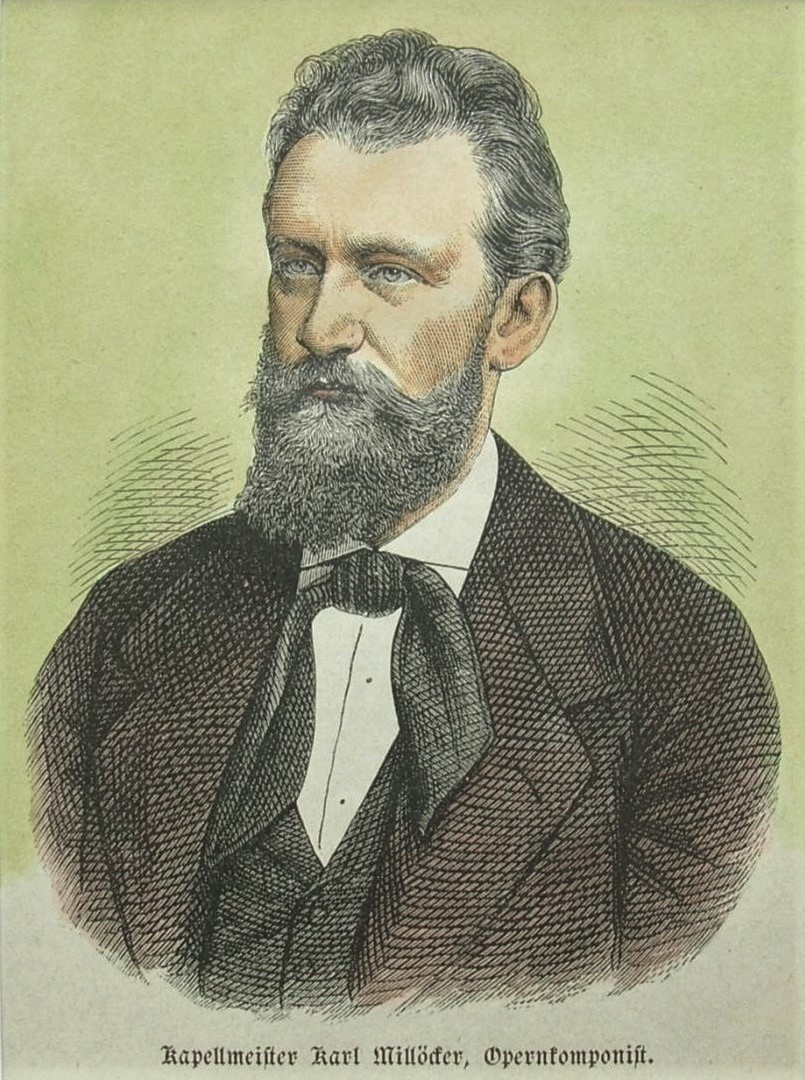
Carl Millöcker (1883)

Carl (or Karl) Joseph Millöcker (29 April 1842 – 31 December 1899), was an Austrian composer of operettas and a conductor.

He was born in Vienna, where he studied the flute at the Vienna Conservatory. While holding various conducting posts in the city, he began to compose operettas. The first was Der tote Gast, an operetta in one act, premiered in 1865 with libretto by Ludwig Harisch, after the novel by Heinrich Zschokke.

The international success of Der Bettelstudent enabled him to retire from conducting. However, he never achieved a comparable success afterward.

Song from Carl Millöcker’s operetta Drei Paar Schuhe (1871), trio arrangement 2025

Carl Millöcker died in Baden bei Wien; on 31 December 1899. He was buried in an honorary grave in Vienna's Zentralfriedhof cemetery (group 32, A35).

== Works ==
See List of operettas and operas by Carl Millöcker.
