= Deaths in July 1988 =

The following is a list of notable deaths in July 1988.

Entries for each day are listed alphabetically by surname. A typical entry lists information in the following sequence:

- Name, age, country of citizenship at birth, subsequent country of citizenship (if applicable), reason for notability, cause of death (if known), and reference.

== July 1988 ==
=== 1 ===
- Jan de Boer, 89, Dutch Olympic footballer (1924, 1928).
- James Edgar Broyhill, 96, American founder of Broyhill Furniture Industries.
- Costante Degan, 58, Italian politician.
- Lex van Delden, 68, Dutch composer.
- Guido Fibbia, 70, Italian World War II fighter pilot.
- Gethyn Hewan, 71, English cricketer.
- Anton Leader, 74, American radio and television director, liver ailment.
- Alice Nunn, 60, American actress (Pee-wee's Big Adventure), heart attack.
- Ed Sauer, 69, American MLB player (Chicago Cubs, St. Louis Cardinals, Boston Braves).
- Hermann Volk, 84, German Roman Catholic cardinal, Bishop of Mainz.

=== 2 ===
- Jimmy Ball, 85, Canadian Olympic sprint runner (1928, 1932).
- Arnold Burmeister, 89, Nazi German general in the Wehrmacht.
- Roy Deller, 75, Australian rules footballer.
- Vibert Douglas, 93, Canadian astronomer and astrophysicist.
- Tom Drake, 75, American MLB player (Cleveland Indians, Brooklyn Dodgers).
- Johann Baptist Gradl, 84, German politician, member of the Bundestag.
- Mahmoud Mirza, 82, Iranian prince of the Qajar dynasty.
- Aldo Tonti, 78, Italian cinematographer (The Savage Innocents).
- Eddie Vinson, 70, American alto saxophonist, heart attack.

=== 3 ===
- Ed Birchall, 64, Ho-Ho the Clown, heart attack.
- Gabriel Dell, 68, American actor, leukemia.
- Thales McReynolds, 45, American NBA player (Baltimore Bullets).
- Bob Ross, 79, Australian rules footballer.
- Richard Schulze-Kossens, 73, Nazi German Obersturmbannführer in the Waffen-SS, lung cancer.
- Steve Walsh, 29, British disc jockey, heart failure.
- Fritz Wiessner, 88, German-American pioneer of free climbing, stroke.

=== 4 ===
- Adrian Adonis, 34, American professional wrestler (American Wrestling Association, World Wrestling Federation), traffic accident.
- Ralph Dennis, 56, American crime fiction author, kidney failure.
- Ian Fleming, 79, English cricketer.
- Shivkumar Joshi, 71, Indian Gujarati author.
- Ferial Karim, 50, Lebanese-Indian actress and singer, Femina Miss India 1962, heart failure.
- Donald MacLaren, 95, Canadian World War I flying ace, helped found the Royal Canadian Air Force.
- Tom Manley, 75, English footballer (Manchester United, Brentford).
- Dave McKigney, 56, Canadian professional wrestler, traffic accident.
- William Thetford, 65, American psychologist and professor, heart attack.
- Lee Weyer, 51, American Major League baseball umpire (National League), heart attack.

=== 5 ===
- Pentti Niinivuori, 56, Finnish Olympic boxer (1952, 1956).
- Yoshihiko Yoshimatsu, 67, Japanese judoka.

=== 6 ===
- Hoang Van Chi, 74, Vietnamese political writer.
- John Drury Clark, 80, American rocket fuel developer, chemist and science fiction writer.
- Víctor Junco, 71, Mexican actor (La Otra, Misterio).
- William Smythe, 95, American physicist at Caltech.
- David T. Wilentz, 93, American attorney (Lindbergh kidnapping trial).
- Rolf Wollner, 82, German Olympic field hockey player (1928).

=== 7 ===
- William R. Cox, 87, American writer, heart failure.
- Jimmy Edwards, 68, English comedy writer and actor (Take It from Here, Whack-O!), pneumonia.
- Helen Gandy, 91, American secretary to F.B.I. director J. Edgar Hoover, heart attack.
- Elmer Johnson, 78, American basketball player.
- Paula Mollenhauer, 79, German Olympic discus thrower (1928, 1936).
- David Atlee Phillips, 65, American Central Intelligence Agency officer, cancer.

=== 8 ===
- Ray Barbuti, 83, American sprinter and Olympic dual gold medalist (1928).
- Antony Fisher, 73, British businessman and think tank founder (Institute of Economic Affairs, Atlas Network), heart disorder.
- Ranjit Khanwilkar, 27, Indian cricketer (Karnataka), train accident.
- Freddie West, 92, British Royal Air Force officer, Victoria Cross recipient.

=== 9 ===
- Ian Allan, 70, Scottish Royal Air Force officer and World War II flying ace.
- Mitchell Clarke, 87, Barbadian cricketer.
- Frank Ellerbe, 92, American MLB player (Washington Senators, St. Louis Browns).
- Alexandru Graur, 88, Romanian linguist.
- Anthony Holland, 60, American actor, suicide.
- Jackie Presser, 61, American labour leader, president of the International Brotherhood of Teamsters, cardiac arrest.
- Barbara Woodhouse, 78, Irish-British dog trainer, author and TV personality (Training Dogs the Woodhouse Way), stroke.

=== 10 ===
- Alf Ackerman, 59, South African footballer and manager (Carlisle United).
- Noel Barber, 78, British novelist and journalist.
- Erik Husted, 88, Danish Olympic field hockey player (1920, 1928).
- Errol John, 63, Trinidad and Tobago–born English actor and playwright (Moon on a Rainbow Shawl).
- Baruch Kamin, 74, Israeli politician, member of the Knesset (1953-1955).
- Enrique Lihn, 58, Chilean poet, cancer.
- James Mardall, 88, English cricketer and British Army officer.
- Ernie Nevel, 68, American MLB player (New York Yankees, Cincinnati Redlegs).
- N. Krishna Pillai, 71, Indian dramatist, translator and historian of Malayalam language.
- Vicente Saadi, 74, Argentinian politician, Governor of Catamarca.

=== 11 ===
- Mike Bamber, 57, British businessman and football executive (Brighton & Hove Albion).
- Robert Ferro, 46, American novelist, AIDS.
- Milton Krims, 84, American screenwriter and novelist, pneumonia.
- Jarava Lal Mehta, 75–76, Indian philosopher, heart attack.
- Lída Merlínová, 82, Czech writer.
- George Nemchik, 73, American Olympic soccer player (1936).
- James Gordon Shanklin, 78, American FBI agent, known for the investigation of the J.F.K. assassination, cancer.
- Ingegärd Töpel, 82, Swedish Olympic diver (1928).
- Barbara Wootton, 91, British sociologist and criminologist, member of the House of Lords.

=== 12 ===
- Al Bedner, 90, American NFL footballer (New York Giants).
- Mick Boon, 85, New Zealand cricketer.
- Josephine Douglas, 61, British actress and producer (Six-Five Special, Emergency Ward 10), cancer.
- Raymond W. Goldsmith, 83, Belgian-born American economist, heart failure.
- Michael Jary, 81, German composer.
- Joshua Logan, 79, American director, playwright and screenwriter (South Pacific), supranuclear palsy.
- Pelagia Majewska, 55, Polish glider pilot, aviation accident.
- John Massis, 48, Belgian strongman and teeth-acrobat, suicide.
- Robert Monteith, 50, New Zealand cricket umpire.
- Mitsuo Nakamura, 77, Japanese writer of biographies and stage-plays.
- Katta Subba Rao, 48, Indian film director.
- Enzo Sacchi, 62, Italian Olympic cyclist (1952).
- Julian Trevelyan, 78, English artist and poet.

=== 13 ===
- Gillis Andersson, 76, Swedish Olympic footballer (1936).
- Huub Bals, 51, Dutch creator and director of International Film Festival Rotterdam, heart attack.
- Ji Dengkui, 65, Chinese political figure, Vice Premier of People's Republic of China.
- Hilda Gobbi, 75, Hungarian actress.
- Christine Mohrmann, 84, Dutch linguist.
- Phil Monroe, 71, American animator and director (Warner Bros. Cartoons), pancreatic cancer.
- Peter Philpott, 73, British RAF officer.
- Ivo Šuprina, 66, Yugoslav footballer.
- Richard Vogt, 75, German boxer and Olympic medalist (1936).

=== 14 ===
- Erik Braadland, 77, Norwegian politician.
- Jerzy Kaczkowski, 50, Polish Olympic weightlifter (1964).
- Harcharan Singh Manget, 56, Indian air force officer, helicopter crash.
- Brian McDonald, 60, Australian rules footballer.
- William Ofori Atta, 77, Ghanaian politician, Minister for Foreign Affairs.
- Peter Raw, 66, Australian R.A.A.F. pilot and senior officer, lymphoma.
- Georg Stetter, 92, Austrian-German nuclear physicist.
- Whitey Witt, 92, American Major League baseball player (Philadelphia Athletics, New York Yankees).

=== 15 ===
- Clyde Beck, 88, American MLB player (Chicago Cubs, Cincinnati Reds).
- Jan Brzák-Felix, 76, Czech Olympic canoeist (1936, 1948, 1952).
- Nils Christiansen, 75, Filipino-American Olympic swimmer (1936).
- Eleanor Estes, 82, American children's writer (Ginger Pye, The Moffats), stroke.
- Edward Grange, 96, Canadian WWI flying ace.
- Jean-Pierre Hoscheid, 76, Luxembourgian Olympic footballer (1936).
- Tore Keller, 83, Swedish international footballer and Olympic medalist (IK Sleipner, Sweden).
- Nozomu Matsumoto, 83, Japanese businessman and inventor, founded Pioneer Corporation.
- Armand Mouyal, 62, French world champion fencer and Olympic medalist (1952, 1956, 1960).

=== 16 ===
- Herbert L. Anderson, 74, American nuclear physicist (University of Chicago), contributed to the Manhattan Project, lung failure due to poisoning.
- Whitfield Connor, 71, American actor, director and producer, complications of stomach surgery.
- Obs Heximer, 78, Canadian NHL player (New York Rangers, Boston Bruins, New York Americans).
- Ole Myrvoll, 77, Norwegian professor and politician.
- Samuel Ruben, 88, American inventor, founder of Duracell.
- Joseph Szydlowski, 91, Polish-born French-Israeli aircraft engine designer, founded Turbomeca.

=== 17 ===
- Bruiser Brody, 42, American professional wrestler, stabbed.
- Frank Carter, 77, Irish politician, member of the Dáil Éireann (1951-1957, 1961-1977).
- Milton Krasner, 84, American cinematographer (Three Coins in the Fountain, Beneath the Planet of the Apes), heart failure.

=== 18 ===
- Valery Burati, 80, American Union organiser, acting chief of the Labor Division of Supreme Commander of the Allied Powers.
- Elsa Gress, 69, Danish essayist and novelist.
- Birger Kaipiainen, 73, Finnish ceramist and designer.
- Emil T. Kaiser, 50, Hungarian-born American biochemist (enzyme modification), complications following kidney transplant.
- Walter Kitchen, 75, Canadian Olympic ice hockey player (1936).
- Jake W. Lindsey, 67, American soldier in the U.S. Army, Medal of Honor recipient, heart attack.
- Nico, 49, German singer and actress (Chelsea Girls), cerebral hemorrhage resulting from fall.
- Joly Braga Santos, 64, Portuguese composer and conductor, stroke.
- John W. Schaum, 83, American pianist and composer.
- Miklós Szentkuthy, 80, Hungarian writer.

=== 19 ===
- Erland Asdahl, 67, Norwegian politician.
- Vilhelm Aubert, 66, Norwegian sociologist, co-founded the Norwegian Institute for Social Research.
- Geoffrey H. Bourne, 78, Australian-American anatomist and primatologist (histochemistry), heart failure.
- Jacques De Wykerslooth De Rooyesteyn, 92, Belgian Olympic modern pentathlete (1924).
- Laurence Impey, 65, South African cricketer.

=== 20 ===
- Hap Allen, 87, American Negro League baseball player.
- Mark Boxer, 57, British magazine editor, brain tumour.
- John W. Galbreath, 90, American building contractor and sportsman, owner of the Pittsburgh Pirates.

=== 21 ===
- Frank Brett, 89, English footballer.
- Øivind Christensen, 88, Norwegian Olympic sailor (1936, 1948, 1960).
- Jack Clark, 62, American television personality, game show host and announcer (The Cross-Wits), bone cancer.
- Dawson Harron, 66, English cricketer.
- Raphael Soriano, 83, Greek-born American architect and educator.
- K. Vijayan, 48, Indian film director.

=== 22 ===
- Andres Allan, 22, Estonian poet.
- Avtar Singh Brahma, 36–37, Indian revolutionary and founder of the Khalistan Liberation Force.
- Tom Brooker, 80, Australian rules footballer.
- Larry Clemmons, 81, American animator, screenwriter and voice actor (Walt Disney Company).
- Duane Jones, 51, American actor (Night of the Living Dead), cardiopulmonary arrest.
- Luigi Lucioni, 87, Italian American painter.
- Eugeniusz Michalak, 79, Polish Olympic cyclist (1928).
- Patrick Newell, 56, British actor (The Avengers), heart attack.

=== 23 ===
- Camillo Arduino, 92, Italian Olympic cyclist (1920).
- Jahangir Khan, 78, Indian test cricketer and Pakistani cricket administrator.
- Stuart Legg, 77, English documentary filmmaker (Churchill's Island, Warclouds in the Pacific).
- Heinz Pagels, 49, American physicist, mountaineering accident.
- Bandu Patil, 52, Indian hockey player and Olympic gold medalist, cardiac arrest.
- Ken Polivka, 67, American MLB player (Cincinnati Reds).
- Shmuel Rechtman, 63-64, Israeli politician, member of the Knesset (1977-1979).

=== 24 ===
- Priscilla Bowman, 60, American jazz and rhythm and blues singer ("Hands Off"), lung cancer.
- Frank Collins, 85, English cricketer.
- Ilona Elek, 81, Hungarian fencer and dual Olympic gold medalist (1936, 1948, 1952).
- Manuel González, 70, Spanish footballer (Granada).
- John Harris, 71, Scottish footballer (Chelsea) and manager (Sheffield United).
- Trevor Harvey, 71, Canadian soccer player.
- Jerry Lane, 62, American MLB player (Washington Senators, Cincinnati Redlegs).
- Robert McClory, 80, American politician, member of U.S. House of Representatives (1963-1983), heart attack.
- G. Tyler Miller, 85, American president of Madison College.
- Joe Orengo, 73, American MLB player (St. Louis Cardinals, New York Giants, Brooklyn Dodgers).
- Bandu Patil, 52, Indian Olympic field hockey player (1964).
- Mira Schendel, 69, Brazilian artist, lung cancer.
- Helmut Schubert, 72, German footballer.
- Michel Villey, 74, French legal philosopher and historian.

=== 25 ===
- Judith Barsi, 10, American child actress (The Land Before Time, All Dogs Go to Heaven), murder-suicide by father.
- Bob Currie, 70, English motorcycling writer and road tester (The Motor Cycle, The Classic Motor Cycle), heart failure.
- Memphis Tennessee Garrison, 98, activist for African Americans.
- Douglas Hickox, 59, English director (The Hound of the Baskervilles, Brannigan), complications from heart surgery.
- Glenn Killinger, 89, American NFL footballer (New York Giants).
- Anton Krásnohorský, 62, Slovak footballer.
- Émile Pouvroux, 87, French Olympic wrestler (1924).
- James Silver, 81, American history professor and author, fought for racial equality, emphysema .
- Giuliana Stramigioli, 73, Italian business woman and Japanologist.
- Dave Tobey, 90, American basketball referee, enshrined in the Basketball Hall of Fame.

=== 26 ===
- Frank Christian, 77, Canadian politician, member of the House of Commons of Canada (1957-1958).
- Al Flair, 72, American MLB player (Boston Red Sox).
- Lai Shiu Wing, 70-71, Chinese Olympic footballer (1948).
- Murari Mohan Mukherjee, 73, Indian plastic surgeon.
- Max Raison, 86, English cricketer (Essex) and publisher (Picture Post, New Scientist).
- Kurt Schneider, 88, German Olympic long-distance runner (1928).
- Tetsuji Takechi, 75, Japanese theatre and film director, critic and author, pancreatic cancer.

=== 27 ===
- James Connerty, 84, South African cricketer.
- Jack Drees, 71, American sportscaster, cancer.
- Brigitte Horney, 77, German actress (Münchhausen).
- M. Kalyanasundaram, 78, Indian politician, member of the Legislative Assembly of Tamil Nadu.
- Mary Simms Oliphant, 97, American historian.
- Antonio Tantay, 68, Filipino Olympic basketball player (1952).
- Alan Tait, 80, Australian cricketer.
- Frank Zamboni, 87, American businessman and inventor (ice resurfacer), heart attack.

=== 28 ===
- Caleb Gattegno, 76, Egyptian educator, psychologist and mathematician, complications of cancer surgery.
- Harold R. Harris, 92, American test pilot and U.S. Army Air Force officer, pneumonia.
- Ray Martin, 78, Australian rules footballer.
- Syed Modi, 25, Indian badminton player, murdered.
- Charles Nicks, 47, American gospel musician, heart failure.
- Tullio Pizzorno, 67, Italian Olympic sailor (1960).
- John Wheatley, 80, Scottish politician and judge, Solicitor General for Scotland.

=== 29 ===
- Ellin Berlin, 85, American author, wife of Irving Berlin, stroke.
- Pablo Cagnasso, 80, Argentine Olympic sports shooter (1948, 1952).
- Czesław Ciupa, 52, Polish footballer.
- Pete Drake, 55, American record producer and pedal steel guitar player ("Stand by Your Man", "Lay Lady Lay"), emphysema.
- Umberto Menegalli, 63, Swiss Olympic fencer (1952).
- Günther Radusch, 75, Nazi German Luftwaffe pilot and fighter ace.
- Georges Vuilleumier, 43, Swiss footballer.

=== 30 ===
- William de Silva, 79, Sri Lankan politician, member of the Ceylon Parliament.
- Arthur Mooney, 63, Australian rules footballer.
- Curtis Shears, 87, American Olympic fencer (1932).
- Bob Woytowich, 46, Canadian NHL ice hockey player (Boston Bruins, Los Angeles Kings), car crash after heart attack.

=== 31 ===
- Stephen Murray-Smith, 65, Australian writer and editor, heart attack.
- André Navarra, 76, French cellist, heart attack.
- Fanny Rowe, 75, English stage, film and television actress (Fresh Fields, After Henry).
- Trinidad Silva, 38, American comedian and actor, car crash.
- Raymond Stross, 72, British-film producer, heart disease.

=== Unknown date ===
- William Rolls, 73, British flying ace in World War II.
