= Alan Tait (disambiguation) =

Alan Tait (born 1964) is a Scottish former rugby footballer and coach.

Alan Tait may also refer to:

- Alan Tait (Australian footballer) (1891–1969), Australian rules footballer who played with University
- Alan Tait (Australian cricketer) (1908-1988), Australian cricketer
- Alan Tait (English cricketer) (born 1953), English cricketer

== See also ==
- Alan Tate (disambiguation)
- Allen Tate, American poet and essayist
