= Bob Currie =

English writer

Currie riding a Brough Superior motorcycle

Robert Frank Currie (26 April 1918 – 25 July 1988) was an English motorcycling writer and road tester, who later became a magazine editor and book author. Mainly known for his UK journalism work with Motor Cycle, a UK weekly motorcycle magazine-turned-newspaper, then from 1981 as Editor of a new monthly magazine The Classic Motor Cycle, he retired in early 1988 suffering from an ongoing illness, after a full-time writing career starting in 1955, and later died of heart failure. He was born in Woolwich and died in Birmingham.

Currie was described in 1967 by his editor as "A prolific writer on all subjects". Writing in Currie's obituary, one former-collaborator remembered that many described him as "The Walking Encyclopaedia of Motor Cycling History", whilst his former understudy and editor-designate John Pearson described his death as "this country has lost its leading writer, historian and authority on veteran, vintage and classic British motorcycles".

== Early life ==
With his younger brother, Ken, Currie spent his first few years with their father, an officer in the Royal Scots Greys, at various postings. Soon after leaving the army in 1924 and settling at Martley, Worcestershire, their sister Daphne was born and Captain Currie died. Life for his widow with three children was difficult, and young Bob was sent to live with an aunt in Dundee, later returning for his education at Worcester Royal Grammar School followed by work as a trainee engineer at Heenan & Froude in Worcester when he first started to ride motorcycles. He joined the Territorial Army, before conscription to the armed forces for the duration of World War II, in the RAOC (later known as REME) where he maintained and repaired tanks and acted as a despatch rider, progressing to the rank of Staff Sergeant.

== Post-war work and journalism ==
After the end of hostilities, Currie returned to work for Heenan & Froude, also becoming involved with the AA magazine, an occasional, newsletter-type publication mailed to members of the UK subscription-based motoring breakdown organisation, and as a contributor to the TT Special, a seasonal newspaper published by former TT rider Geoff Davison in June for the Isle of Man TT races, with occasional associated books.

As a motorcycle enthusiast and seasonal reporter he travelled to the Isle of Man. When staying in the same Sefton Hotel as the Motor Cycle staff he suggested a collaboration, to enable mutually-better reported coverage of the racing events. Currie had previously submitted occasional articles to Motor Cycle magazine, and in 1955 a vacancy occurred when a regular staff-writer moved to a four-wheel magazine. Currie was offered the vacancy, initially at head office in London, progressing in 1956 to Midland Editor based at Birmingham, the area where his family resided, in a city central to a region where many British motorcycle manufacturers, metal-industries and component-producers were located. When writing his serialised memoirs of 1969, former Motor Cycling journalist Bruce Main-Smith stated he was offered the position of Midland Editor with then-rival publication The Motor Cycle, but did not want to leave the London area and return to Birmingham where he was born, despite a generous offer of salary from then-Editor Harry Louis, a decision Main-Smith later regretted, and the job went to Currie.

Specialising in the traditional history of motorcycle manufacturing, road-testing and technical articles, Currie established a strong rapport with the various manufacturers, often enjoying their trust in new developments which he kept confidential until the companies issued press releases. In 1965 Currie moved to an office suite at Lynton House, Birmingham, where his desk was part of the parent-publisher's suite in a modern office tower block, Currie was the last journalist on the staff of Motor Cycle to have a company motorcycle – he chose a Triumph Bonneville.

== Magazine editing and books ==

In the 1970s, after a 10-year demise of British motorcycle manufacturing, Currie showed an increasing interest in the vintage and classic era, establishing a regular feature in Motor Cycle Weekly (as Motor Cycle was then known) named 'Past Times'. Motor Cycle had merged with Motor Cycling in 1967, so their combined archives were available to Currie.

Publisher IPC decided the time was right to establish in 1981 a completely new magazine, The Classic Motor Cycle, reminiscent of their early historic publication named The Motor Cycle, to address the increasing public interest and popularity of classic motorcycles. Complete operational control was given to Currie in Birmingham, although overall responsibility remained at head-office in Sutton, Surrey, with former Motor Cycle Weekly editor Mick Woollett as Editor-in-Chief. In 1983, IPC sold The Classic Motor Cycle to EMAP along with the Motor Cycle and Motor Cycling archives, with Currie retained as editor based in Birmingham but with an assistant editor now at the Peterborough base of EMAP.

A bachelor, Currie played the banjolele, harmonica and sang. He was an experienced trials rider and also a keen local motorcycle-club enthusiast who gave slide shows and talks. As Vice-President of the Vintage Motor Cycle Club he judged concours d'elegance restorations, held Question-and-Answer sessions at classic bike shows and never tired of riding the many machines features in the magazine. Although most of his life was dedicated to motorcycles, he was also interested in steam power and traction engines.

During the middle and later parts of his career Currie converted his vast experience of British manufacturers and period motorcycles into authorship of books, mostly in his own right but occasionally in collaboration with others.

== Finale ==
Before his retirement planned for early 1988, he suffered from an illness involving incapacitation due to kidney problems. No longer able to type or write, he continued to edit using dictation – sometimes from his hospital bed – with assistance from his sister Daphne. Assistant-editor John Pearson continued to produce the magazine in close-collaboration. Later in the same year Currie died of heart failure.

== Selected bibliography ==
- The Glory of the Manx TT 1907-1975. 1976, New English Library
- Great British Motorcycles of the Fifties. 1981, Hamlyn Publishing Group, ISBN 0-86363-010-3
- Motor Cycling in the 1930s. 1981, Littlehampton Book Services, ISBN 9780600349310
- Classic British Motorcycles - The Final Years. 1984, Temple Press, ISBN 9780600351184
- Classic British Motor Cycles. 1993, Chancellor Press, ISBN 9781851522507
- Great British Motorcycles of the 1950s and 1960s. 2014 ISBN 9780753727621
- Great British Motorcycles of the Thirties. ISBN 9780753703779
- Great British Motorcycles of the Sixties. ISBN 9780753702802

=== Co-authored works ===
- The Art of Moto-Cross. Bob Currie and Jeff Smith, 1967, Cassell & Co.
- The Story of Triumph Motor Cycles. Bob Currie and Harry Louis, 1978, Patrick Stephens, ISBN 9780850593112
