= Rehfisch =

Rehfisch is a surname. Notable people with the surname include:

- Alison Rehfisch (1900–1975), Australian painter
- Eugen Rehfisch (1862–1937), German physician
- Hans Rehfisch (1891–1960), German playwright, short story writer, and film script writer
