= Motor Cycle News =

UK weekly motorcycling newspaper

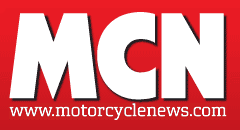
- Type: Weekly newspaper
- Format: Tabloid
- Owner(s): Bauer
- Publisher: Rachael Beesley
- Editor: Richard Newland
- Founded: 1955
- Headquarters: Peterborough, England
- Circulation: 85,651
- ISSN: 0027-1853
- Website: www.motorcyclenews.com

MCN or Motor Cycle News is a UK weekly motorcycling newspaper published by Bauer Consumer Media, based in Peterborough, United Kingdom. It claims to be "the world’s biggest weekly motorcycle newspaper".

The title was founded in late 1955 as Motorcycle News by Cyril Quantrill, a former employee of Motor Cycling, and was sold to EMAP in 1956. Bauer bought Emap's consumer media division in 2008.

The brand has expanded to include the MCN website, MCN Mobile, iPhone app, the 'MCN Compare' Insurance Comparison service, MCN London and Scottish Motorcycle Show and the MCN Live! at Skegness party weekend.

In 2009, average weekly circulation was 114,304 copies according to the Audit Bureau of Circulations, and 2010 it was 106,446 copies.

The figure for 2018 was 56,839.

== Early years ==
Cyril Quantrill was an employee of Motor Cycling under famous editor Graham Walker, learning his trade both pre and post-war. The British motorcycle media was traditionally dominated by two rival publishing houses - Temple Press with Motor Cycling and Iliffe with The Motor Cycle. Both were weekly magazine-format Thursday publications.

Using his growing skill-set, Quantrill recognised an opening for a Wednesday newspaper-format venture which could better-showcase sport — an area largely not covered by his employer Motor Cycling or The Motor Cycle

The first edition 30 November 1955

With his friend Peter Baldwin — whose father owned a print-works at Tunbridge Wells — Quantrill established his own publication Motorcycle News from a small office off Fleet Street and, in conjunction with Baldwin Press, produced the first issue dated 30 November 1955.

Limited by a 3,000 issue print-run capability and underfunding, Quantrill arranged to sell to EMAP in 1956.

August 1960 example of Title reformatted from original Italicised script

Under new ownership the issues were still priced at fourpence, but the title had changed to non-italic upper case MOTORCYCLE NEWS.

Quantrill stayed on as editor and with EMAP's backing the brand flourished. By the time of Quantrill's resignation in 1961 circulation was at 67,000.

Quantrill continued working as a journalist, including as editor of Motor Cyclist Illustrated, published by City Magazines Ltd of London. Continuing Quantrill's earlier motivation of sports reporting, it had the strapline "the sporting monthly".

== Middle years ==
Example of 1962-onwards logo with enlarged initial letters

Motorcycle News as a sporting newspaper was pitched to beat the rivals to the newsstands by one day. Both of the rivals were still magazine-format and remained traditionally producing practical and informative general coverage.

By 1962, the front page had been restyled by replacing the centred-title with a left-corner masthead box. Changing the Title text to three stacked short words with larger initial letters released more space for headlines and larger images whilst creating the MOTOR CYCLE NEWS which in the public mind became the common name and gave rise to the acronym 'MCN'.

In March 1966 MCN produced a colour ten-year anniversary supplement with various contributors including sporting notables Mike Hailwood, Bill Ivy, Jeff Smith, Dave Bickers, Alf Hagon and Charlie Rous summarising the developments and highlights of the past ten years' reporting, together with representatives of the major bike manufacturers stating their aspirations for future trading.

In 1962, rival Motor Cycling had gone to newspaper format having more sporting coverage and with larger pages allowing for large action images. Another rival publication Motor Cycle (as it was by then known, having dropped 'The' from its title in 1962) continued as a magazine until August 1967 when it joined with elements of Motor Cycling to produce a newspaper format on Wednesdays as Motor Cycle Incorporating Motor Cycling.

== Later years ==
The two publications continued as rival 'papers. From the late 1960s, the MCN corner-masthead became blue, turning to the familiar red for the 1970s, gradually introducing more colour into the pages. Rival 'Motor Cycle' became Motor Cycle Weekly, which reverted to a glossy-magazine format in 1983 in an effort to boost sales figures by then-publisher IPC before eventual closure in late 1983. MCN continued from strength to strength.

== MCN awards ==
MCN have been presenting an annual awards ceremony almost since they were founded in 1955. These included the popularity poll 'Man of the Year' and the overall 'MCN Machine of the Year' award:

Year	Country	Rider	Notes
1958	UK	John Surtees	
1959	UK	John Surtees	
1960	UK	Dave Bickers	
1961	UK	Mike Hailwood	
1962	UK	Derek Minter	
1963	UK	Mike Hailwood	
1964	UK	Jeff Smith	
1965	UK	Bill Ivy	
1973	UK	Barry Sheene	
1974	UK	Phil Read	
1975	UK	Barry Sheene	
1978	UK	Mike Hailwood	

Year	Country	Bike	Notes
1968	UK	Norton Commando	
1969	UK	Norton Commando	
1970	UK	Norton Commando	
1971	UK	Norton Commando	
1972	UK	Norton Commando	
1973	Japan	Kawasaki Z1	
1974	Japan	Kawasaki Z1	
1975	Japan	Kawasaki Z1	
1976	Japan	Kawasaki Z1	
1977	Japan	Yamaha XS750	
1979	UK	Triumph Bonneville T140	
1983	Japan	Kawasaki GPz1100	
1984	Japan	Kawasaki GPz900R	
1988	Japan	Kawasaki ZX-10	
1989	Japan	Kawasaki KR-1	
1990	Japan	Kawasaki ZZ-R1100	
1998	Japan	Yamaha R1	
1999	Germany	BMW K1200LT	
2001	Japan	Suzuki GSX-R1000	
2002	Italy	Ducati 999	
2003	Japan	Honda CBR600RR	
2004	UK	Triumph Rocket III	
2005	Japan	Suzuki GSX-R1000	
2006	Japan	Yamaha YZFR6R	
2007	Italy	Ducati 1098	
2008	Italy	Ducati Desmosedici RR	
2009	Japan	Yamaha R1	
2010	Germany	BMW S1000RR	
2011	Italy	Ducati Diavel	
2012	Germany	BMW S1000RR	
2013	Germany	BMW R1200GS	
2014	Japan	Yamaha MT-07	
2015	Japan	Kawasaki H2	
2016	Japan	Honda RC213V-S	
2017	Britain	Triumph Street Triple RS	
2018	Italy	Ducati Panigale V4S	
2019	Germany	BMW S1000RR	
2020	Britain	Triumph Tiger 900 Rally Pro	
2021	Italy	Aprilia RS660	
