= Brian McDonald =

Brian McDonald or MacDonald may refer to:

- Brian McDonald (Australian footballer) (born 1927), Australian rules footballer
- Brian Macdonald (choreographer) (1928–2014), Canadian dancer, choreographer and director
- Brian McDonald (Laois Gaelic footballer) (born 1980)
- Brian McDonald (Dublin Gaelic footballer) (born 1941), Irish Gaelic footballer
- Brian McDonald (ice hockey) (born 1945), former ice hockey centre
- Brian Macdonald (politician), Canadian politician
- Brian MacDonald (sailor) (born 1943), Canadian Paralympic sailor
- Brian McDonald (screenwriter) (born 1965), American screenwriter
- Brian Macdonald (bishop), Anglican bishop in Australia
- Brian MacDonald, of the singing duo The MacDonald Brothers
