= Alpar =

Alpar may refer to:

== People with the surname ==
- Csoma Alpar (born 1984), Romanian futsal player
- Ignác Alpár (1855–1928), Hungarian architect
- Gitta Alpár (1903–1991) Hungarian-born actress
- Saffet Rıza Alpar (1903–1981), Turkish chemist and rector

== Other uses ==
- Alpár, village a.k.a. Tiszaalpár
- Alpar AG, a Swiss airline active from 1929–47

== See also ==
- Alpár (Hungarian surname and masculine given name)
