= Kępno =

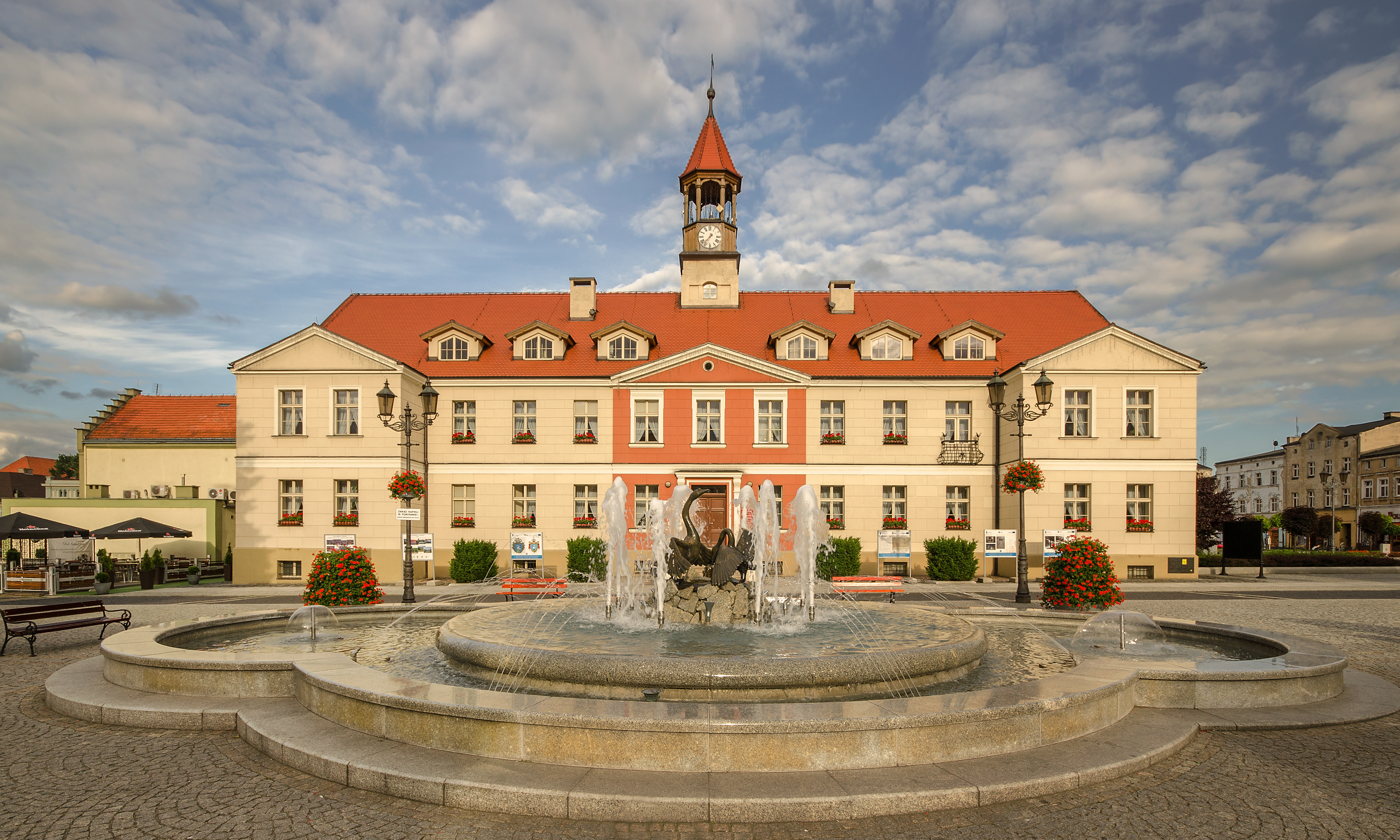
- Town hall

- Flag Coat of arms

- Location within Poland
- Coordinates: 51°17′N 17°59′E
- Country: Poland
- Voivodeship: Greater Poland
- County: Kępno
- Gmina: Kępno
- First mentioned: 1282
- Town rights: ca. 1283

Area
  - Total: 7.8 km^{2} (3.0 sq mi)

Population (2016)
  - Total: 14,419
  - Density: 1,800/km^{2} (4,800/sq mi)
- Time zone: UTC+1 (CET)
  - Summer (DST): UTC+2 (CEST)
- Postal code: 63-600
- Vehicle registration: PKE
- Climate: Cfb
- Website: http://www.um.kepno.pl

Kępno (Polish pronunciation: [ˈkempno]; German: Kempen, earlier Langenfurt) is a town in south-central Poland. Kępno is located in the historical Wieluń Land. It lies on the outskirts of the Greater Poland Voivodeship, bordering the historical region of Silesia and the Łódź Voivodeship. As of December 31, 2009 Kępno had a population of 14,760. One popular attraction in Kępno is the Rynek (market square).

== History ==
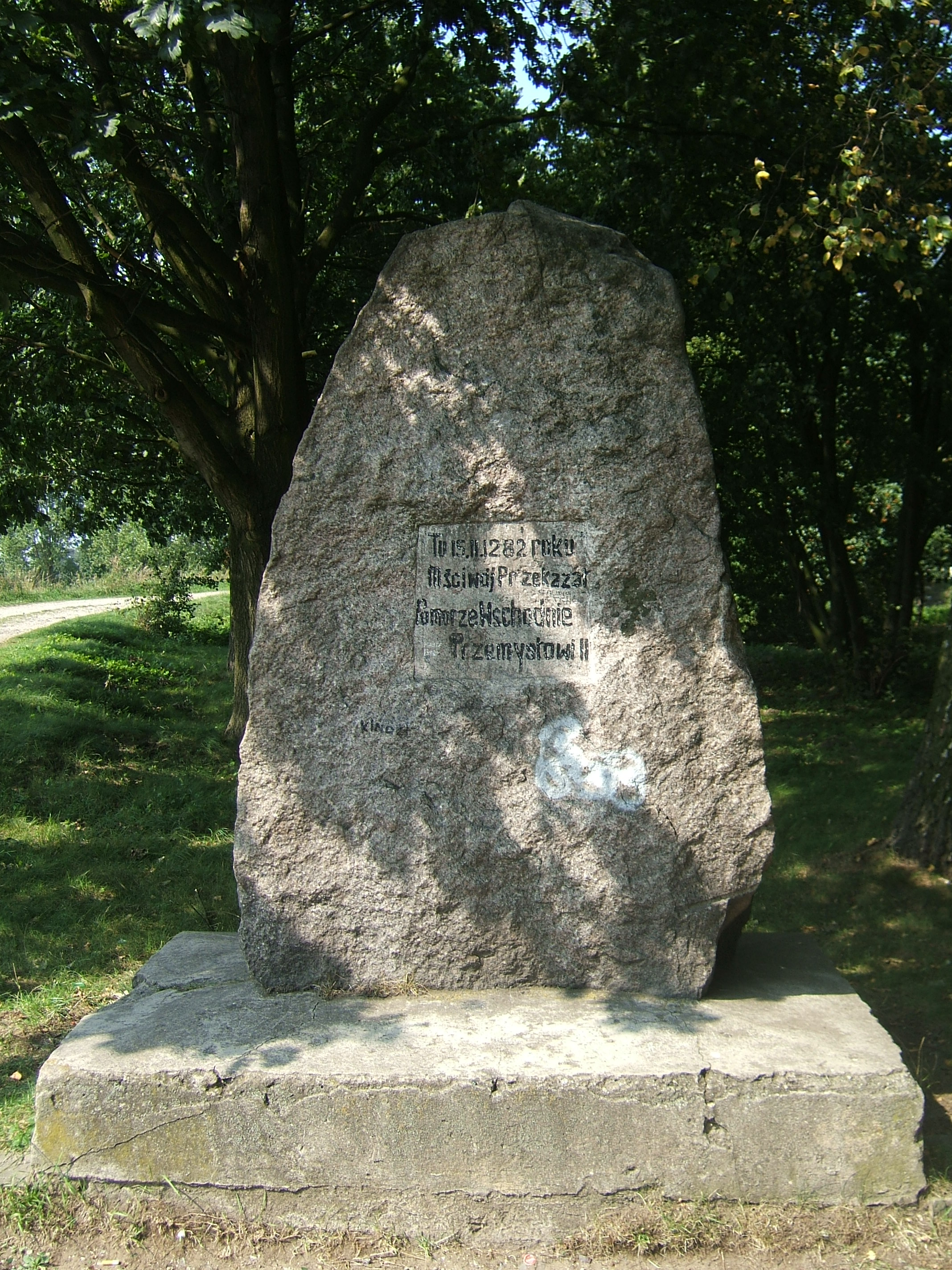
Memorial stone commemorating the Treaty of Kępno from 1282

The history of Kępno dates back to a medieval Polish stronghold. The oldest known mention of Kępno comes from 1282, when it was the place of signing of the Treaty of Kępno, between dukes of fragmented Poland, Przemysł II, Duke of Greater Poland and Mestwin II, Duke of Pomerania. In 1283 it enjoyed town rights. Initially a royal city of Poland, in 1365 it was granted by King Casimir III the Great to knight and noble Wierzbięta z Paniewic. Administratively located in the Sieradz Voivodeship in the Greater Poland Province, it became a village again. It regained town rights in 1660, by decision of King John II Casimir of Poland. Protestants from nearby Silesia as well as Jews settled in Kępno in the 17th century. One of two main routes connecting Warsaw and Dresden ran through the town in the 18th century and Kings Augustus II the Strong and Augustus III of Poland often traveled that route.

Kępno was annexed by the Kingdom of Prussia in the 1793 Second Partition of Poland. Administered within South Prussia from 1793 to 1807, it was part of the Napoleonic Duchy of Warsaw from 1807 to 1815. As Kempen, it was restored to Prussia in the 1815 Congress of Vienna and administered within the Grand Duchy of Posen (until 1848) and the Province of Posen, within which it was the seat of the district Kempen in Posen. The town was a 19th-century shtetl. The majority of the Jews left the city during the second half of the 19th century because of the epidemics (cholera, etc.) and the poor living conditions. They left mainly for Wrocław and surroundings, Berlin, and the Americas. Kempen (Kepno) immigrants were the first Jews to settle in Guatemala, and formed the basis of the German-Jewish community there. In the meantime, the Polish population was subject to Germanisation policies. Since the mid-19th century, to resist Germanisation, Poles founded various organizations, including industrial and cultural societies, printing houses and a local branch of the "Sokół" Polish Gymnastic Society. In the early 20th century local Poles protested against Germanisation policies.

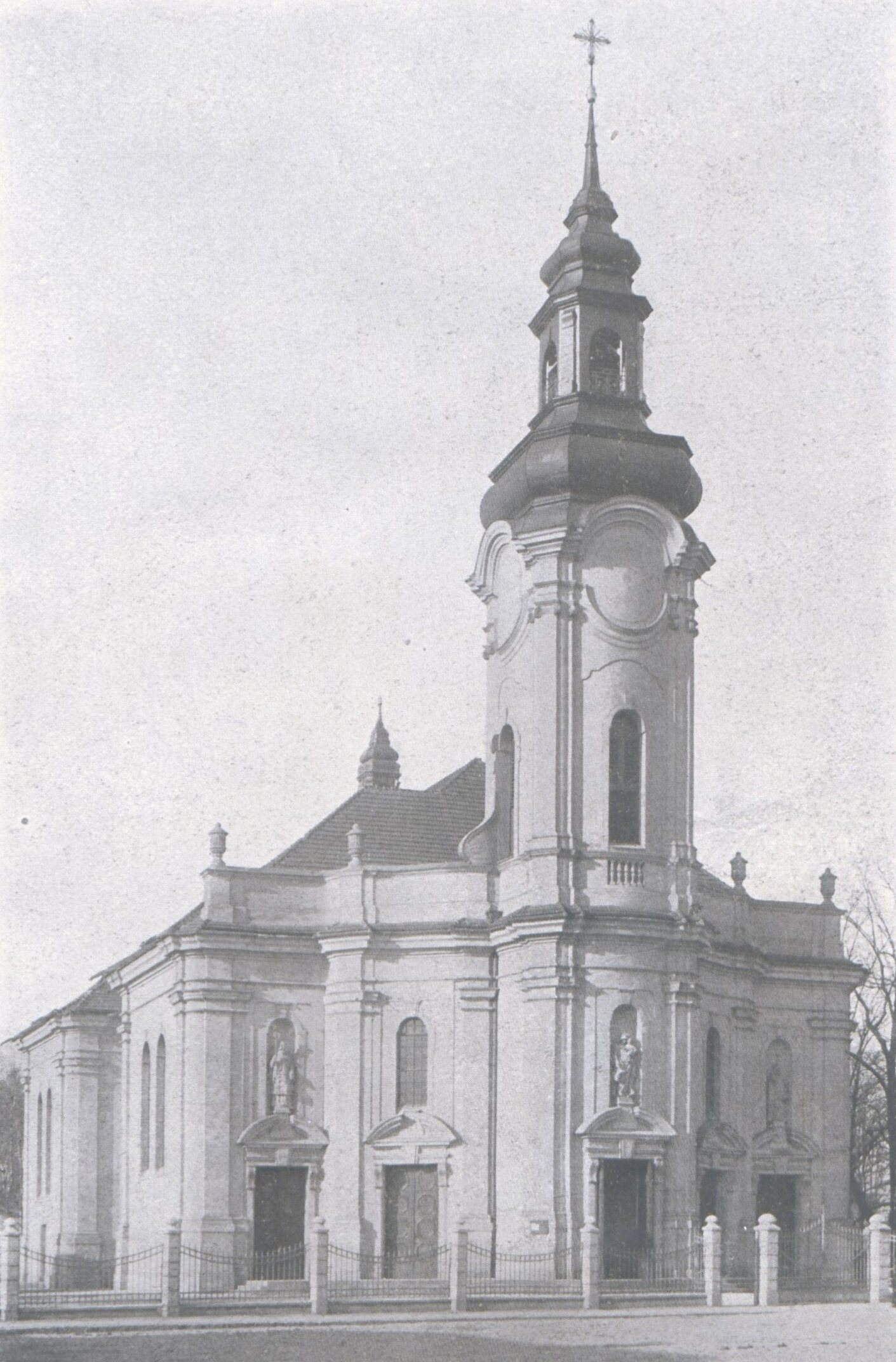
St. Martin's Church before 1909

In 1918 Poland regained independence after World War I and the Greater Poland Uprising broke out, the aim of which was to reunite the region with Poland. In response the Germans placed over 1,000 Grenzschutz troops in the town and persecuted the local Polish population. In January 1919, the Germans interned six leading local Polish activists in Świętoszów. Despite their plans, the Polish insurgents did not try to recapture the town, however, it was still restored to Poland on 17 January 1920.

Following the invasion of Poland and the outbreak of the Second World War in September 1939, Kępno was occupied by the Wehrmacht and on September 6–7, 1939 the Einsatzgruppe III entered the town to commit atrocities against Poles. Some Poles from Kępno were murdered by German troops already on September 7, 1939, in the nearby village of Wylazłów. The town was annexed by Nazi Germany, renamed Kempen and administered as part of the county or district (kreis) of the same name within Reichsgau Wartheland. Its population was subject to segregation, Germanisation, confiscation of property, arrests, expulsions, deportations to forced labour, imprisonment in concentration camps and executions. The Germans established and operated a Nazi prison in the town. Polish monuments were destroyed. The Polish resistance movement was organized in Kępno in November 1939. Red Army troops took the town on January 21, 1945, and with the end of the war, the town returned to Poland, although with a Soviet-installed communist regime, which remained in power until the Fall of Communism in the 1980s. The Polish resistance movement remained active in the town, and in September 1945 it captured the local communist police station and liberated the prisoners.

== Demographics ==
Historical population

Year	Pop.	±%
1843	6,413	—
1871	6,030	−6.0%
1880	6,168	+2.3%
1890	5,465	−11.4%
1900	5,718	+4.6%
1910	6,400	+11.9%

Year	Pop.	±%
1921	6,210	−3.0%
1931	7,182	+15.7%
1939	7,778	+8.3%
1950	7,733	−0.6%
1960	9,177	+18.7%
2010	14,682	+60.0%

== Cuisine ==
Kępno is one of the production sites of the Greater Poland liliput cheese (ser liliput wielkopolski), a traditional regional Polish cheese, protected as a traditional food by the Ministry of Agriculture and Rural Development of Poland.

== Notable residents ==
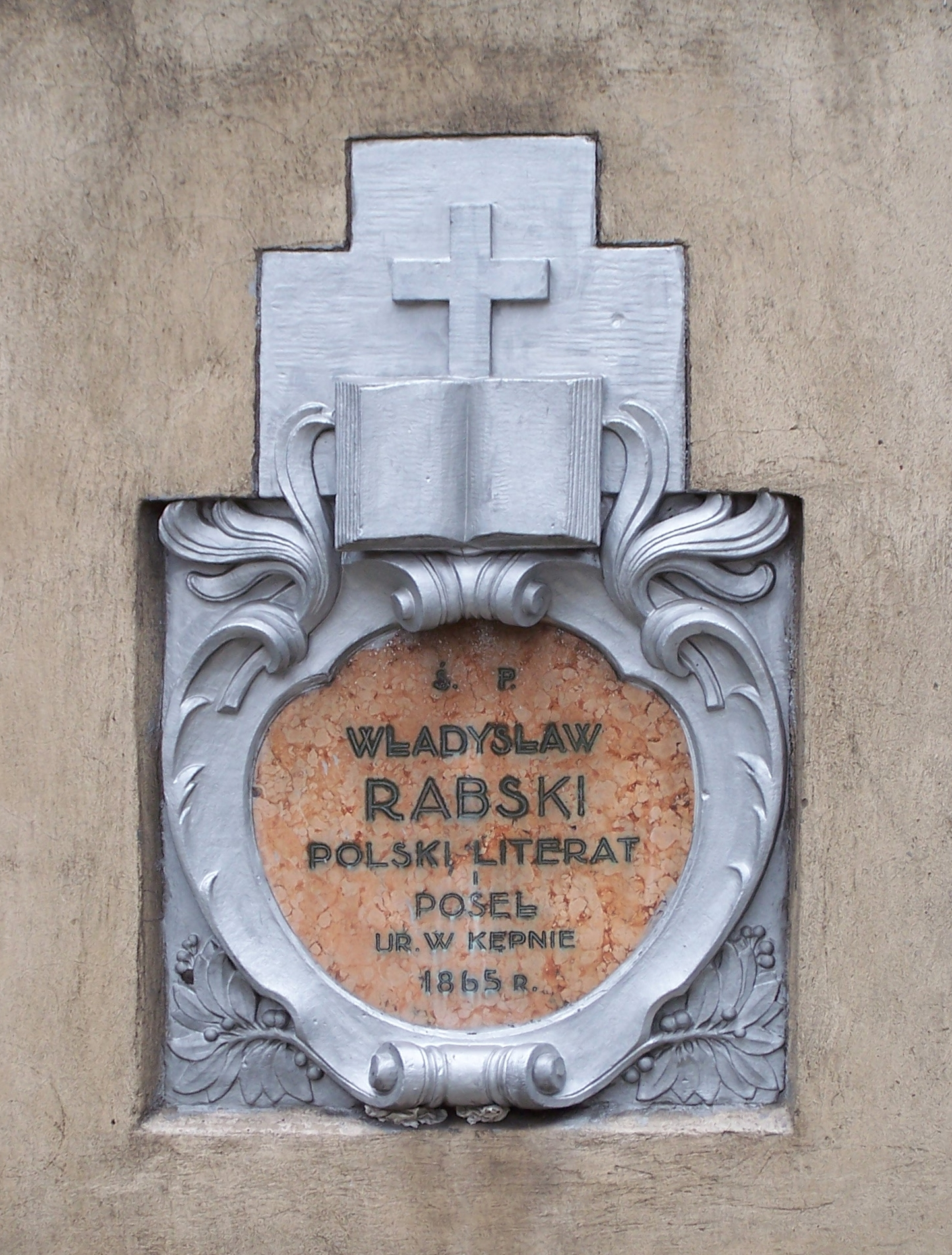
Memorial plaque dedicated to the Kępno-born Polish writer Władysław Rabski

- Wilhelm Freund (1806–1894), philologist
- Samuel Holdheim (1806–1860), reform rabbi
- Malbim (1809–1879), rabbi
- Louis Phillips (1829–1900), wealthy land owner and rancher in Los Angeles, born in Kępno
- Hermann Aron (1845–1913), electrical engineer
- Gustav Jacob Born (1851–1900), histologist
- Eugen Rehfisch (1862–1937), physician
- Władysław Rabski (1865–1925), publicist, writer and member of parliament
- Edward Lasker (1885–1981), chess player
- Hans Schleger (1898–1976), graphic designer, born in Kempen
- Bogdan Baranowski (1927–2014), chemist
- Witold Tomczak (1957-2025), physician, politician

== Education ==
- Wyższa Szkoła Zarządzania "Edukacja" in Wrocław, branch in Kępno

== Transport ==
The intersection of the Polish S8 and S11 highways is located just outside of the town limits, north-east of Kępno. There is also a train station.

== Sports ==
The local football club is Polonia Kępno. It competes in the lower leagues.

== Gallery ==
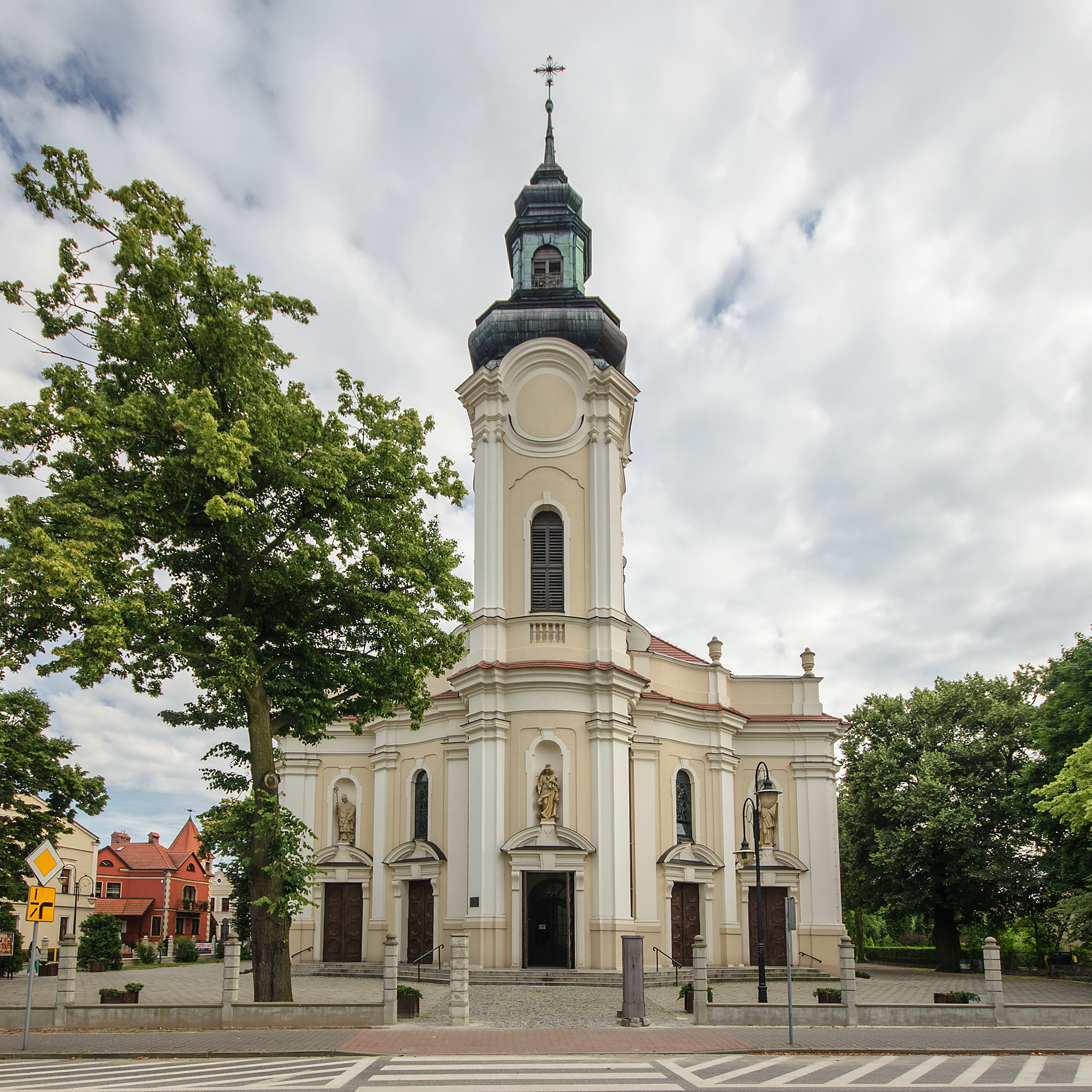
St. Martin's Church

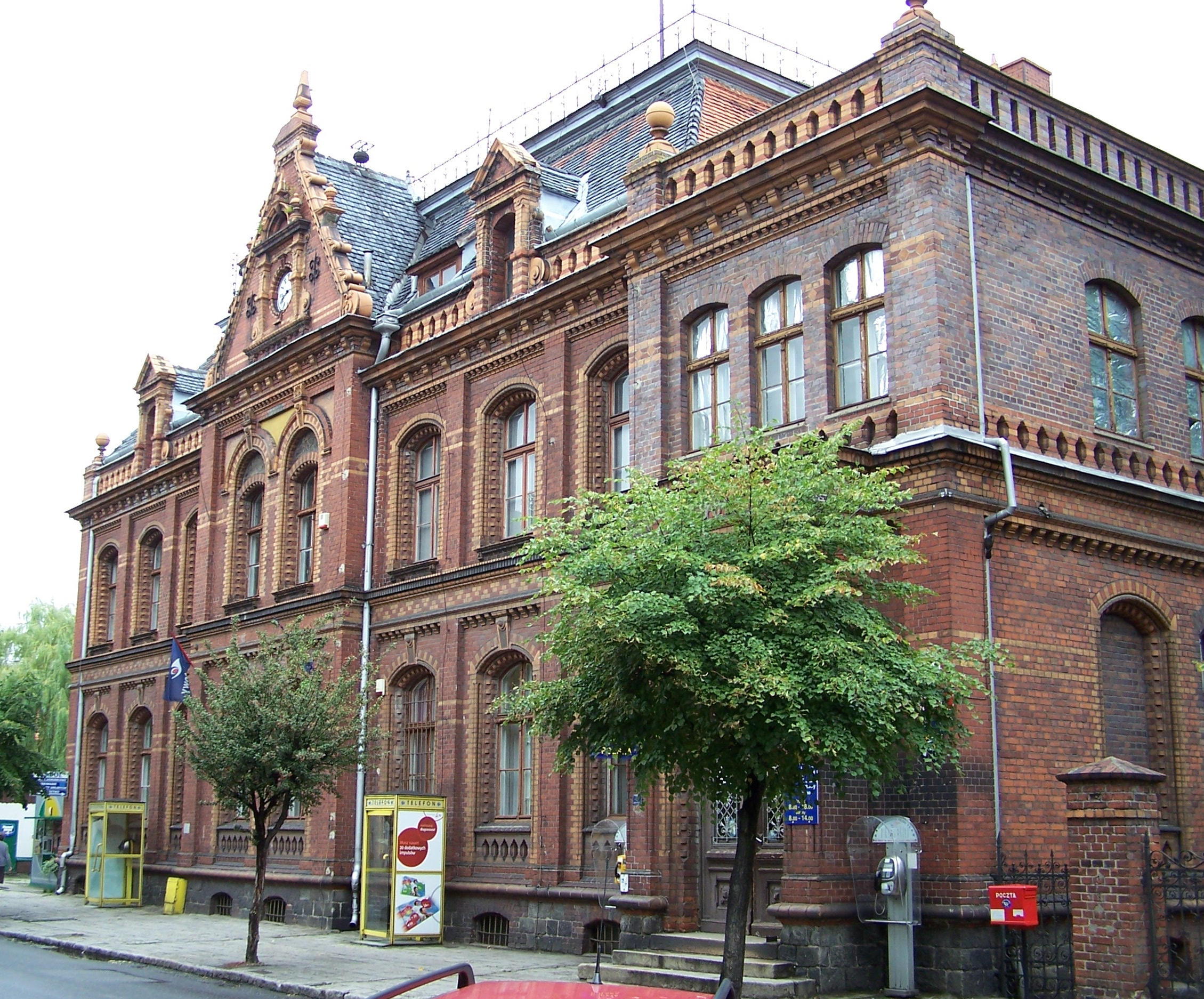
Main Post Office

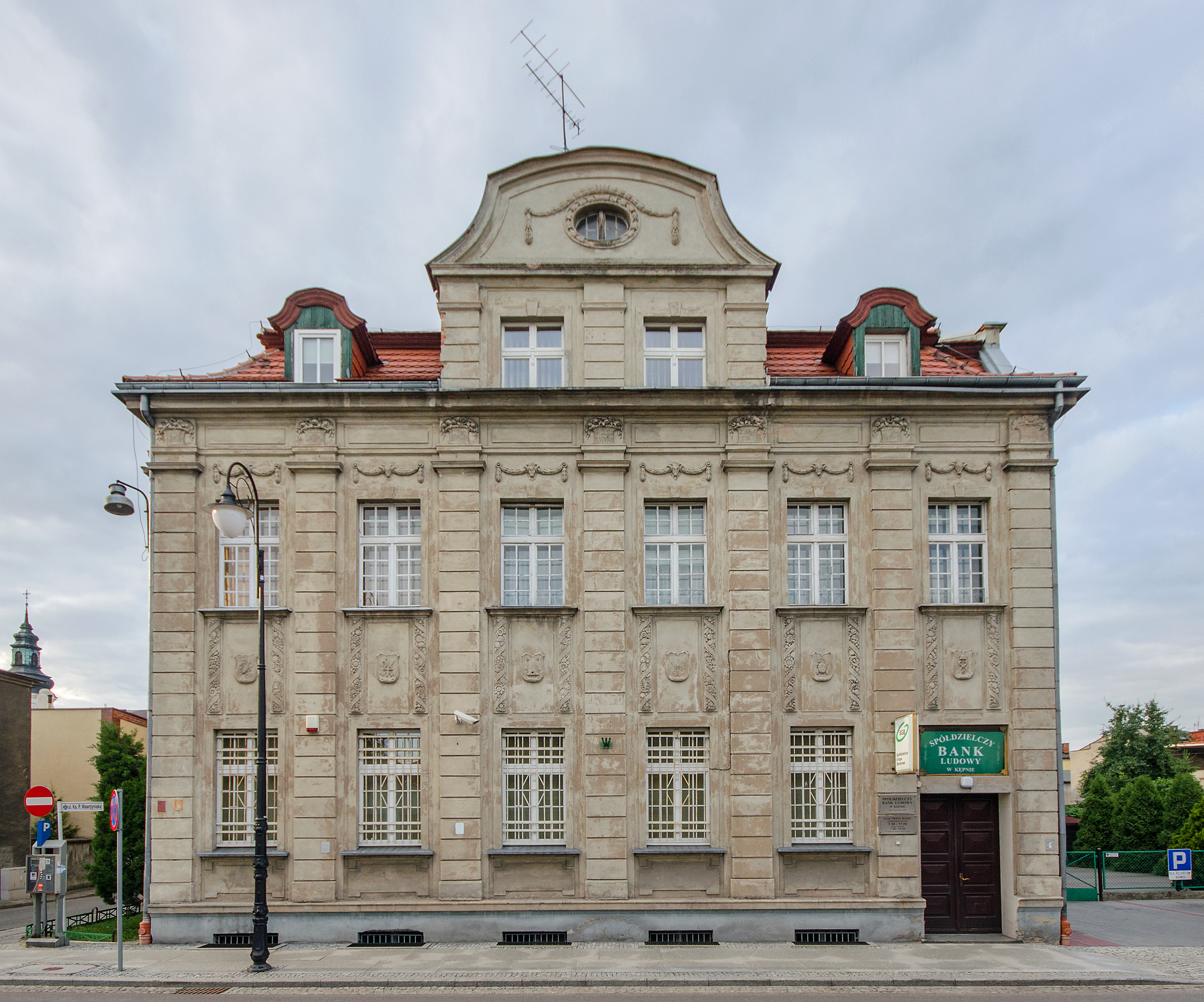
A historic bank building on Wawrzyniak Street

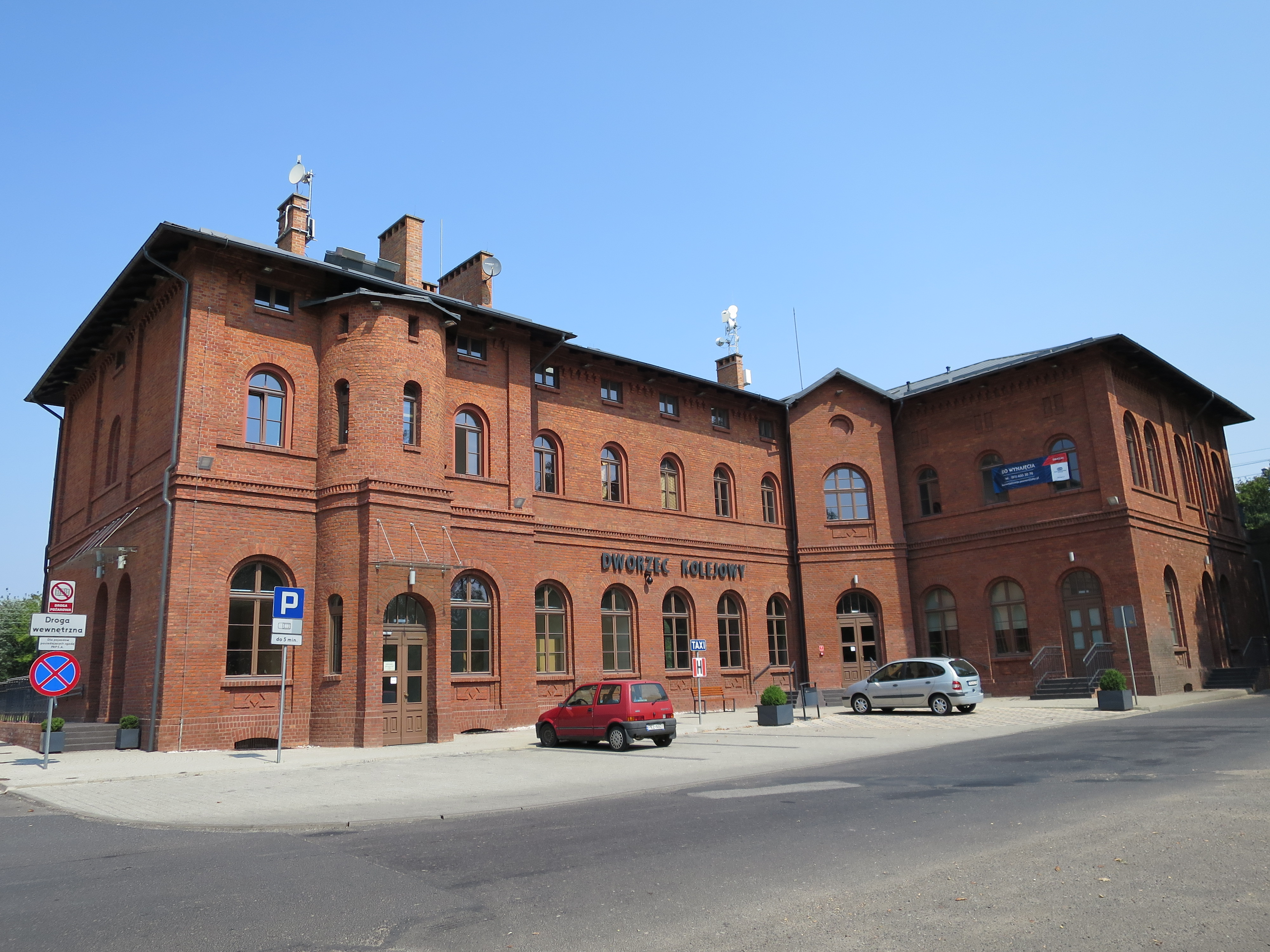
Train station

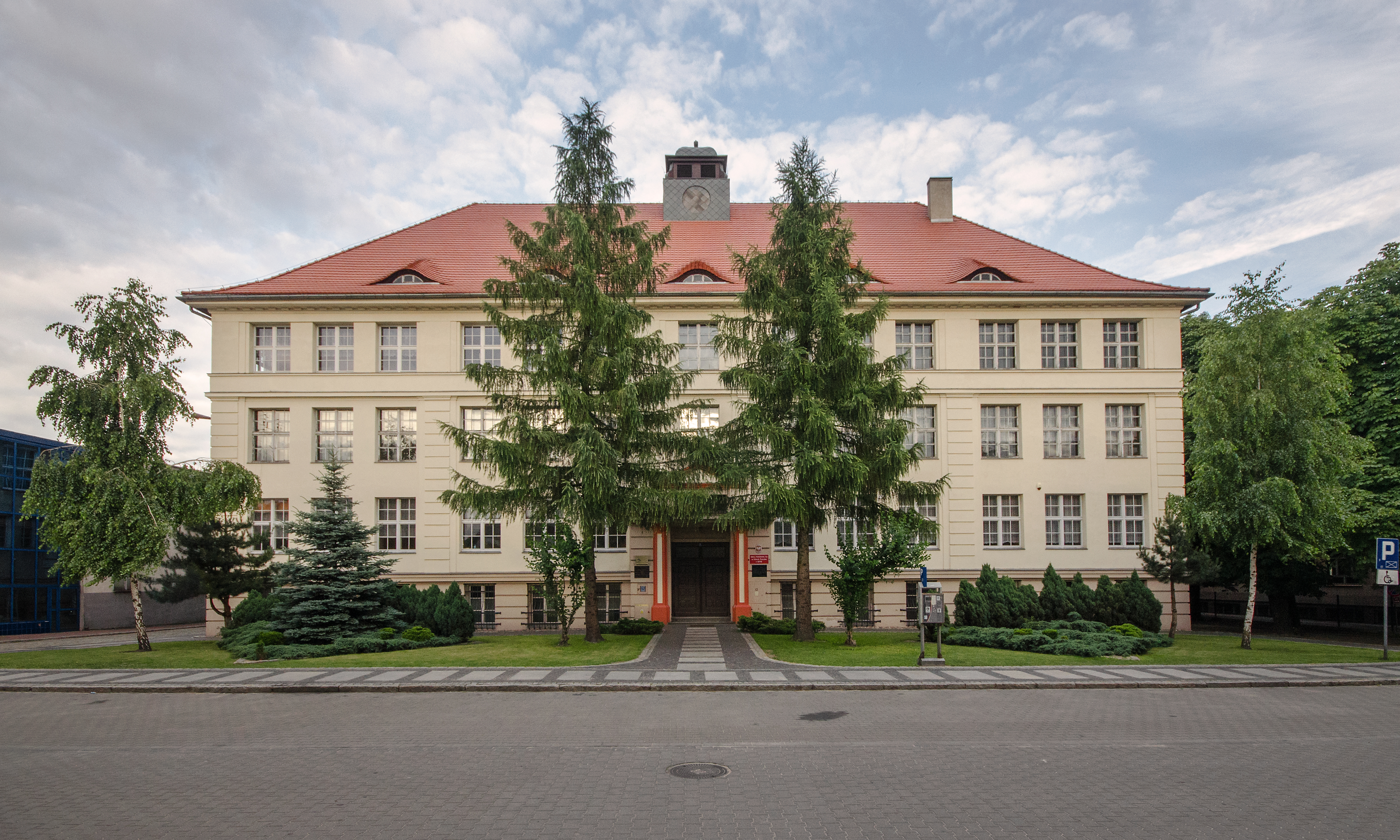
Primary school No. 1

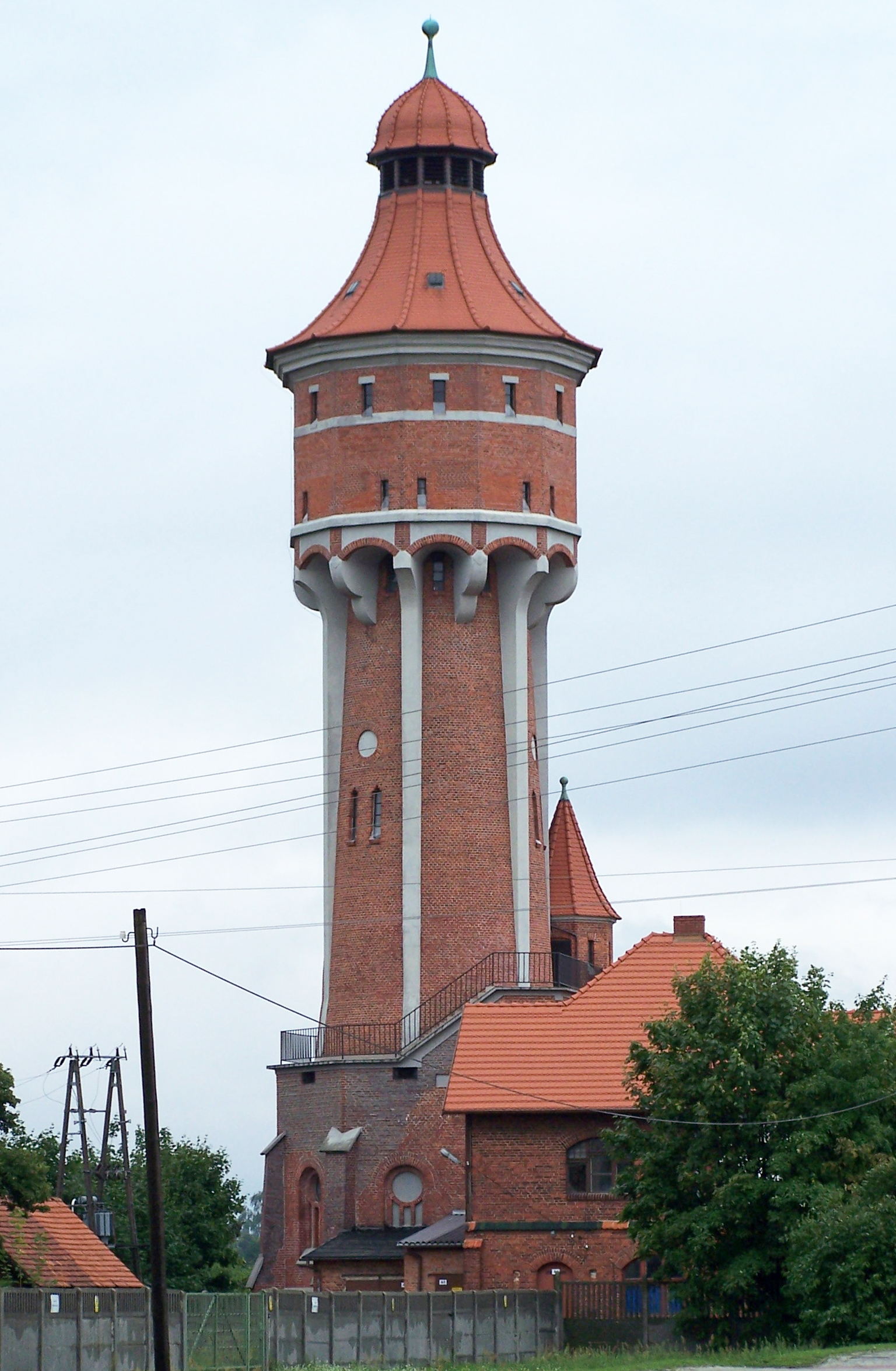
A water tower
