= Disk 413 =

1936 film

- Directed by: Richard Pottier
- Written by: Hans Rehfisch (short story); André-Paul Antoine
- Produced by: Claude Heymann
- Starring: Gitta Alpar; Constant Rémy; Jules Berry
- Cinematography: André Dantan
- Edited by: Pierre Méguérian
- Music by: Nicholas Brodszky
- Production company: Franco London Films
- Distributed by: Éclair-Journal
- Release date: 24 July 1936
- Running time: 82 minutes
- Country: France
- Language: French

Disk 413 (French: Le disque 413) is a 1936 French spy film directed by Richard Pottier and starring Gitta Alpar, Constant Rémy and Jules Berry. It was shot at Ealing Studios in London. It was the French version of the British film Guilty Melody.

== Synopsis ==
In London the singer Marguerite Salvini falls in love with Captain Richard Maury, who is working for the British intelligence services. Soon afterwards her husband, who she believed was dead, returns. He is spying for an enemy power and plans to steal a document, framing his wife and her love for the theft.

== Cast ==
- Gitta Alpar as Marguerite Salvini
- Constant Rémy as Colonel
- Jules Berry as Captain Richard Maury
- Tomas Alcaide
- Gaby Basset as Cecile
- Pierre Finaly
- Jean Galland as Count Illeano / British Intelligence Agent
- Pierre Larquey as Belinsky
- Maximilienne as La princesse

== Bibliography ==
- Fawkes, Richard (2000). Opera on Film. London: Duckworth. ISBN 978-0-7156-2943-7.
