= Doctor Bertram =

1957 film

- Directed by: Werner Klingler
- Written by: J.A. Hübler-Kahla
- Based on: Der Frauenarzt, a 1928 play by Hans Rehfisch
- Produced by: J.A. Hübler-Kahla
- Starring: Willy Birgel; Winnie Markus; Lucie Mannheim
- Cinematography: Erich Claunigk
- Edited by: Ingrid Wacker
- Music by: Horst Dempwolff
- Production company: H.K.-Film
- Distributed by: Neue Filmverleih
- Release date: 14 November 1957
- Running time: 88 minutes
- Country: West Germany
- Language: German

Doctor Bertram (German: Frauenarzt Dr. Bertram) is a 1957 West German drama film directed by Werner Klingler and starring Willy Birgel, Winnie Markus and Lucie Mannheim. It is based upon the play by Hans Rehfisch. It was shot at the Bavaria Studios in Munich.The film's sets were designed by the art directors Max Mellin and Karl Weber.

== Cast ==
- Willy Birgel as Doctor Bertram
- Winnie Markus as Martina Eichstätter
- Antje Geerk as Hilde Bogner
- Sonja Ziemann as Nelly
- Lucie Mannheim as Frau Losch
- Dietmar Schönherr as Kurt Losch
- Franz Muxeneder as Hubke
- Helen Vita as Frau Sommerfeld
- Hermann Nehlsen as Doctor Warsitz
- Trude Hesterberg as Frau Gollicke
- Ingrid Lutz as Frau Krusius
- Angelika Ritter
- Florentine von Castell
- Klaus Langer
- Werner Lieven

== Bibliography ==
- Bergfelder, Tim; Bock, Hans-Michael (2009). The Concise Cinegraph: Encyclopedia of German. Berghahn Books.
