= Alan Tate (disambiguation) =

Alan Tate (born 1982) is an English footballer.

Alan or Allen Tate may also refer to:

== Writers ==
- Alan Tate (journalist) Australian journalist and environmentalist, joint Gold Walkley winner 1989
- Allen Tate (1899–1979), American poet and essayist, frequently misspelled "Alan Tate" in print sources

== Others ==
- Alan Tate (chess player), winner of Scottish Chess Championship
- Allen Tate (musician), singer in American music group San Fermin

== See also ==
- Alan Tait (disambiguation)
