= Guilty Melody =

- Directed by: Richard Pottier
- Written by: Hans Rehfisch (short story); G.F. Salmony
- Produced by: Friedrich Deutschmeister
- Starring: Don Alcaide; Gitta Alpar; John Loder; Nils Asther
- Cinematography: Jan Stallich
- Music by: Nicholas Brodszky
- Production company: Franco London Films
- Distributed by: Associated British Film Distributors
- Release date: 22 July 1936
- Running time: 75 minutes
- Country: United Kingdom
- Language: English

Guilty Melody is a 1936 British drama film directed by Richard Pottier and starring Don Alcaide, Gitta Alpar and John Loder. It was based on a short story by Hans José Rehfisch. In the film, a British spy falls in love with a singer whose husband is working for the enemy. It was made at Ealing Studios by the independent company Franco London Films. The film's sets were designed by art director Holmes Paul.

A separate French-language version Disk 413 was also made.

== Cast ==
- Don Alcaide as Duke of Mantua
- Gitta Alpar as Marguerite Salvini
- Arty Ash as Inspector Bartle
- Nils Asther as Galloni
- Coral Browne as Cecile
- Clifford Buckton as Police Inspector
- Robert English as Chief Inspector
- Ethel Griffies as Lady Rochester
- John Loder as Richard Carter

== Bibliography ==
- Low, Rachael. Filmmaking in 1930s Britain. George Allen & Unwin, 1985.
- Wood, Linda. British Films, 1927-1939. British Film Institute, 1986.
