= Alpár =

Alpár is both a Hungarian surname and a masculine Hungarian given name. Notable people with the name include:

== Surname ==
- Gitta Alpár (1903–1991), Hungarian-born opera and operetta soprano
- Ignác Alpár, (1855–1928), Hungarian architect

== Given name ==
- Alpár Jegenyés (born 1958), Hungarian handball player
- Alpár Mészáros (born 1964), Romanian footballer

== See also ==
- Alpar (disambiguation), including people with the surname
- Tiszaalpár
