= Danton (1931 film) =

1931 film

- Kortner as Danton
- Directed by: Hans Behrendt
- Written by: Heinz Goldberg; Hans Rehfisch
- Produced by: Arnold Pressburger
- Starring: Fritz Kortner; Lucie Mannheim; Gustaf Gründgens
- Cinematography: Léonce-Henri Burel; Nicolas Farkas
- Edited by: René Métain
- Music by: Artur Guttmann
- Production company: Cine-Allianz Tonfilm
- Distributed by: Süd-Film
- Release date: 21 January 1931
- Running time: 92 minutes
- Country: Germany
- Language: German

Danton is a 1931 German historical drama film directed by Hans Behrendt and starring Fritz Kortner, Lucie Mannheim and Gustaf Gründgens. It depicts the dramatic downfall and execution of Georges Danton in 1794 at the hands of Maximilien Robespierre.

== Plot ==
The film is set amidst the French Revolution. The revolutionaries are discussing what happened to King Louis XVI. The group around Georges Danton advocates the execution. The king is tried and executed. Further trials against nobles follow, and death sentences are pronounced en masse. When Danton visits a prison, he falls in love with the prisoner Louise Gély. Now Danton comes into conflict with his opponent Robespierre. Robespierre succeeds in bringing Danton to the dock and his former comrade-in-arms Danton is also sentenced to death and executed under the guillotine.

== Cast ==
- Fritz Kortner as Danton
- Lucie Mannheim as Louise Gely
- Gustaf Gründgens as Robespierre
- Alexander Granach as Marat
- Gustav von Wangenheim as Desmoulins
- Werner Schott as St. Just
- Hermann Speelmans as Legendre
- Georg John as Fouquier-Tinville
- Walter Werner as Malsherbes
- Ernst Stahl-Nachbaur as Louis XVI
- Georg H. Schnell as The Duke of Coburg
- Ferdinand Hart as General Dumouriez
- Carl Goetz as Kleinrentner
- Till Klockow as Cornelia
- Friedrich Gnaß as Sanson

== See also ==
- Danton (1921)

== Bibliography ==
- Hake, Sabine (2002). German National Cinema. Routledge. ISBN 978-0-415-08901-2.
