= Eugen Rehfisch =

German physician

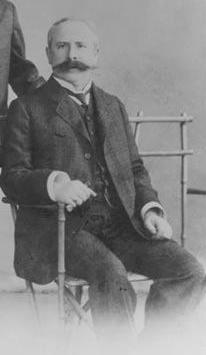
Eugen Rehfisch (1862-1937)

Eugen Rehfisch (6 March 1862 – 7 October 1937) was a German physician of Jewish descent born in Kępno, Kingdom of Prussia

He studied medicine at the Universities of Berlin and Würzburg, earning his doctorate in 1887. Soon afterwards he worked as a physician in Berlin, where he was a colleague of urologist Leopold Casper (1859-1959). From 1896 to 1900 he performed important urodynamic research at the university's institute of physiology. Later, he was awarded the title of professor.

Rehfisch is remembered for his investigations on the physiology of micturition and bladder innervation, and is credited as being the first to gauge the phenomena of bladder pressure and urinary flow simultaneously in a human being. From these experiments, he helped lay a foundation for the advancement of modern urodynamics.

The "Eugen-Rehfisch-Preis" is an award issued by the Forum Urodynamicum in recognition for achievements in the field of neuro-urology. From 1901 onwards, Rehfisch's scientific focus was largely in the disciplines of cardiology and psychiatry.

He was the father of the playwright Hans Rehfisch.

== Selected publications ==
- Ueber acute Spermatocystitis. Deutsche Medizinische Wochenschrift 21, ss. 334–335 (1895) - On acute spermatocystitis.
- Über den Mechanismus des Harnblasenverschlusses und der Harnentleerung. Virchow's Archiv 150, 1, ss. 111–151 (1897) - On the mechanism of bladder closure and voiding.
- Über die Innervation der Harnblase. Virchow's Archiv 161, 3, ss. 528–568 (1900) - Involving innervation of the urinary bladder.
- Die Prognose der Herzarhytmie. Deutsche Medizinische Wochenschrift 29, ss. 347–351 (1903) - Prognosis of heart arrhythmia.
- Nervöse und kardiale Arhythmie. Deutsche Medizinische Wochenschrift 30, ss. 382–429 (1904) - Nervous and cardiac arrhythmia.
- Die experimentellen Grundlagen des Elektromyogramms. Deutsche Medizinische Wochenschrift 36, s. 977–1038 (1910) - Experimental basics of the electromyogram.
- Zur Diagnose der Pulmonalinsuffizienz. Deutsche Medizinische Wochenschrift 40, s. 221 (1914) - Diagnosis of pulmonary insufficiency.
