= Hans Rehfisch =

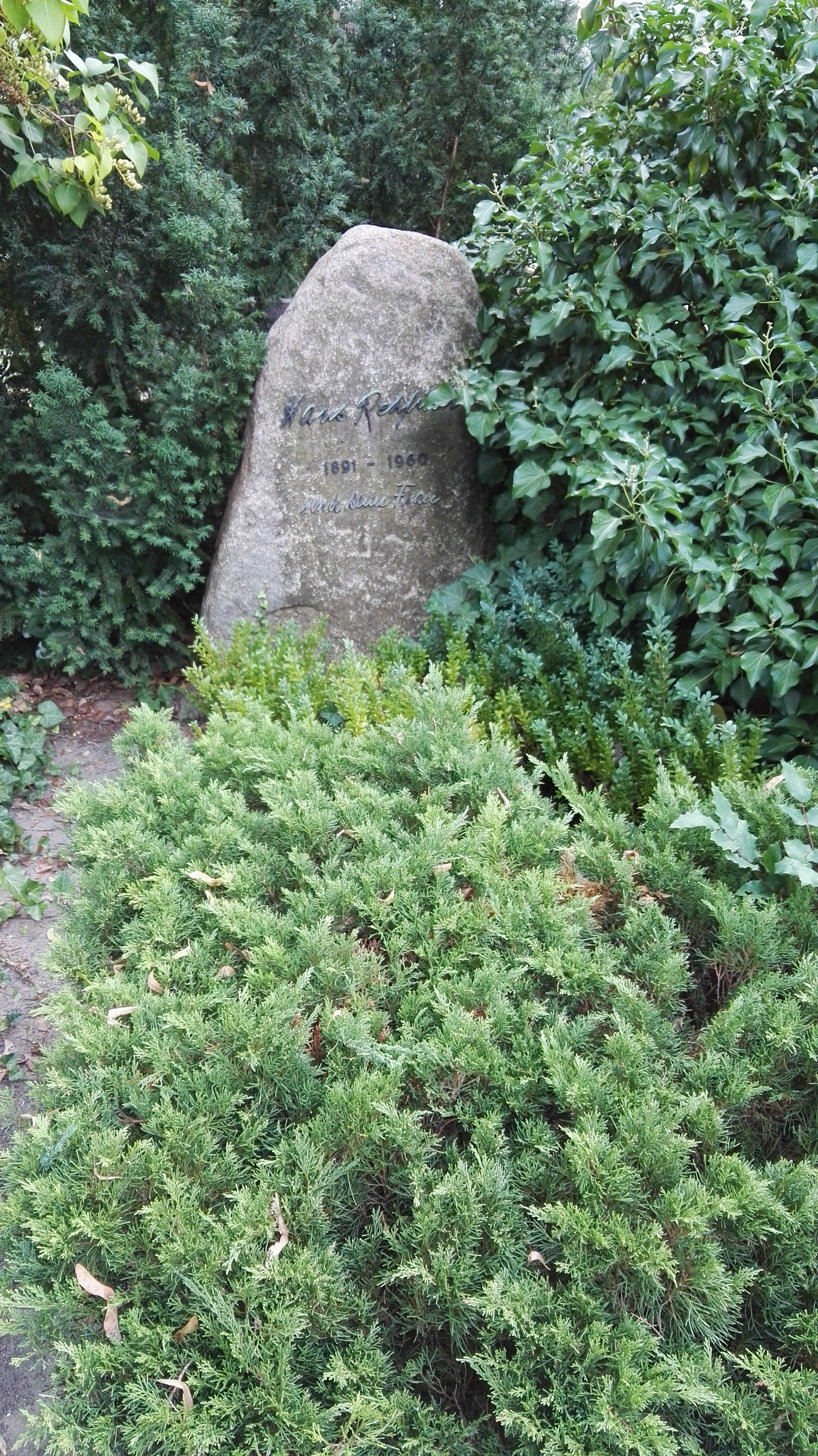
Grave of Hans José Rehfisch in the Dorotheenstadt Cemetery in Berlin-Mitte; Honorary grave

Hans Rehfisch (10 April 1891 – 9 June 1960), also known as Hans José Rehfisch or H.J. Rehfisch, was a German playwright, short story writer and film script writer.

== Early life ==
Born to Jewish parents in Berlin, where his father Eugen Rehfisch was a physician, Hans began his career as a successful lawyer before turning his hand to literature and the theatre. He became the most famous German playwright of the 1920s. Marlene Dietrich made her name as a young actress in Berlin playing the role of Lou in Rehfisch's social satire Duel at the Lido in 1926. Together with Erwin Piscator he led the Zentraltheater in 1920, in the Alten Jakobstrasse, Berlin-Mitte. His most notorious work was probably The Dreyfus Affair (1929) a historical play written in collaboration with Wilhelm Herzog. It was made into a German film (1930), a British film (1931) and plagiarised in a Hollywood film. Rehfisch sued Warner Brothers film studios for using his work in the film The Life of Emile Zola (1937) and though he was awarded damages he did not win a writer's credit on the film. The Dreyfus Affair was premiered under the pseudonym René Kestner at the Berlin Volksbuhne in 1929, and was to be performed in Paris in 1931. However, after one performance the rightwing Action Francaise mounted riots and the production was withdrawn.

== 1930s and 1940s ==
Rehfisch also published works under the pseudonyms H.G. Tennyson Holmes, René Kestner, Sydney Phillips, Georg Turner-Krebs, José Rehfisch and Georg Turner. He was a freelance writer until March 1933, when he was arrested by the Nazis in Dresden after the premiere of a play called Hauptmann Grisel's Betrayal, a warning of the dangers of National Socialism. He was released on the condition that he left the country never to return, so he escaped first to Vienna and then to London, where he worked first as a metal worker, then for the BBC and the US Office of Strategic Services.

While interred at Sefton Internment Camp on the Isle of Man in 1940, Rehfisch directed a modern-dress production of Julius Caesar (see citation 6 above). Once released and in London, together with the philosopher Hermann Friedmann, the journalist Heinz Jaeger (1899-1975) and the former artistic director of the Staatsschauspiel Dresden Karl Wollf (1876-1952), Rehfisch founded The Club 1943, a cultural association of German-speaking emigrants. (This was after he left the FGCL or Free German League of Culture). In 1944 he edited a symposium On Tyrants: 4 Centuries of Struggle against Tyranny in Germany, published by The Club 1943. Some of his plays written in English were produced in London, for instance G.I. Brides at Sea, which was played at the Granville Theatre of Varieties in Walham Green in July 1946. One of his short stories, titled Guilty Melody, was made into a British film in 1936. In 1938 The Iron Road was written in English by Rehfisch in collaboration with the English screenwriter Rupert Downing, for a production at the Birmingham Repertory Theatre which opened on 8 October that year. It was commissioned to mark the centenary of the London to Birmingham railway line, and dramatised the trials of George Stephenson who had to build over a swamp, and the effect of the railways on trade and the common man. Directed by Herbert M. Prentice it was considered an artistic success but did not transfer to London.

== Return to Germany ==
After World War II he taught at The New School for Social Research in New York (1947–49), then returned to Germany in 1950 to settle in Hamburg. He made the first of many visits to East Germany in 1957. Rehfisch wrote many successful plays, mostly on the subject of politics, contemporary society and the abuse of power. Wer weint um Juckenack? or Who Cries for Juckenack (1924) was made into a TV film in 1965. Rehfisch plays were often forensic in nature, involving the uncovering of truth and often featuring lawyers and judges. He was twice president of the Union of German Stage Writers and Composers (1931–33 and 1951–53). In 1967 his selected works appeared in four volumes, edited by the Eastern German Academy of Arts, Berlin.

== Works ==
In The Dreyfus Affair (1929) Rehfisch used a historical story to denounce militarism and anti-Semitism. It was adapted into a British film, entitled Dreyfus, in 1931. Der Verrat des Hauptmanns Grisel (Captain Grisel's Betrayal) (1932) warned of the approaching fascist dictatorship. His last play, The Boomerang (1960, presented that year at the Leipziger Schauspielhaus) deals with the 1872 trial of A. Bebel and W. Liebknecht. Rehfisch also wrote the novels The Witches of Paris (1951) and Lysistrata’s Marriage (1959). His book about Danton was made into a German film in 1931.

His greatest success in the postwar period was the antimilitarist "Colonel Chabert" comedy in 1955-56. He also wrote radio plays, and for a time was chairman of the Society for the Exploitation of Literary Copyrights (GELU).

He was co-writer of an experimental American film called Dreams That Money Can Buy. A 1947 feature in colour, it was directed by surrealist artist and dada film-theorist Hans Richter, and produced by Kenneth Macpherson and Peggy Guggenheim. Collaborators included Max Ernst, Marcel Duchamp, Man Ray, Alexander Calder, Darius Milhaud and Fernand Léger. The film won the Award for the Best Original Contribution to the Progress of Cinematography at the 1947 Venice Film Festival.

== Personal life ==
Rehfisch married first Lilli Stadhagen (1917-1938) an Adlerian psychoanalyst. They had two children, the poet Beata Duncan and her brother Tom Rehfisch, before divorcing. He was then married to Antonie Wald from 1942 until his death in Scuol, Switzerland on 9 June 1960.

== Plays ==
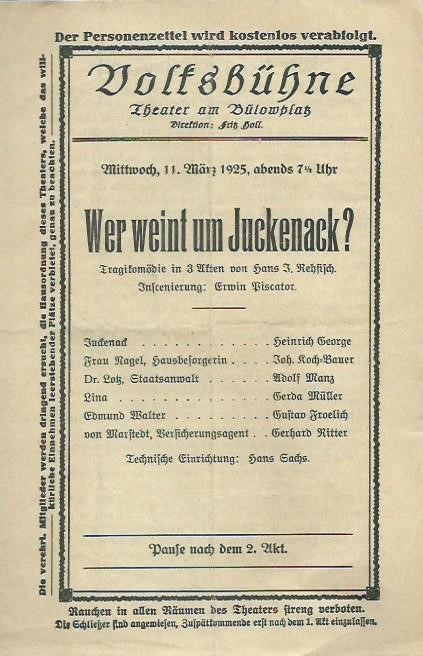
Programme for Wer weint um Juckenack?, directed by Erwin Piscator at the Volksbühne, Berlin, 1 February 1925, (1925)

- Die goldenen Waffen - Tragedy (1913)
- Das Paradies - a Tragedy (1919)
- Der Chauffeur Martin - A tragedy in 5 acts (1920)
- Deukalion - A mythological drama (1921)
- Die Erziehung durch „Kolibri“ - Comedy in 3 acts (1922)
- Wer weint um Juckenack? (Who Weeps for Juckenack?) - Tragi-comedy in 3 acts (1924)
- Nickel and the 36 Righteous (about the Tzadikim Nistarim) - Comedy in 3 acts (1925)
- Duel at the Lido - Comedy in 3 acts (1926)
- Darüber läßt sich reden - Berlin Bilderbogen in 3 acts (1926)
- Razzia - (Raid) A Berlin tragi-comedy in 9 sketches (1927)
- Der Frauenarzt - (The Gynaecologist) play in 3 acts (1928)
- Pietro Aretino - Play in 3 Akten (1929)
- The Dreyfus Affair - Play in 5 acts (1929) (collaboration with Wilhelm Herzog)
- Brest-Litowsk - A drama on European Peace (1930)
- Der Verrat des Hauptmanns Grisel - Play in 3 acts (1932)
- Doktor Semmelweis - Play (1934)
- Gentlemen - Play (1935)
- Der lächerliche Sir Anthony - Play (1935)
- The Chain - play in 3 acts (1935), as HG Tennyson-Holme
- Water for Canitoga - Play in 3 acts (1936)
- Erste Liebe - Comedy (1937)
- Kampf ums Blatt - Play (1937)
- College Boys - Play (1937)
- The Iron Road - Play (1938)
- G.I. Brides at Sea - Play (1943) (with Lionel Birch)
- Quell der Verheissung - Play (1945)
- Hände Weg Von Helena! - Play (1951)
- Die Eiserne Straße - Play (1952)
- Von Der Reise Zurück - Play (1952)
- Das Ewig Weibliche - Play (1953)
- Der Kassenarzt - Play (1954)
- Oberst Chabert - Play in 3 acts based on a story by Balzac (1955)
- Strafsache Doktor Helbig (1955)
- Jenseits der Angst - Play in 3 acts (1958)
- Bumerang - Play (1960)
- Verrat in Rom - Play in 3 acts (1960)

== Films ==
- Children of the Street (Germany, 1929, based on the play Razzia)
- Dreyfus (UK, 1931, based on the play The Dreyfus Affair)
- Disk 413 (France, 1936, based on the short story The Guilty Voice)
  - Guilty Melody (UK, 1936, based on the short story The Guilty Voice)
- Water for Canitoga (Germany, 1939, based on the play Water for Canitoga) - uncredited
- Doctor Bertram (West Germany, 1957, based on the play Der Frauenarzt)
- Hexen von Paris (East Germany, 1958, TV play, based on the novel The Witches of Paris)
- Affäre Dreyfus (West Germany, 1959, TV play, based on the play The Dreyfus Affair)
- Wer weint um Juckenack? (West Germany, 1965, TV play, based on the play Wer weint um Juckenack?)

=== Screenwriter ===
- The Little Slave (Germany, 1928)
- The Last Company (Germany, 1930)
- Danton (Germany, 1931)
- Dreams That Money Can Buy (1947, produced by Peggy Guggenheim)
- Bluebeard (France/West Germany, 1951)

== Books ==
- In Tyrannos - Four centuries of struggle against tyranny in Germany. A symposium. (Hrsg. by Hans Rehfisch, 1944)
- The Witches of Paris - novel (1957)
- Lysistratas Wedding - novel (1959)
