= Frank Collins (English cricketer) =

English cricketer

Personal information
- Full name: Frank Collins
- Born: 3 February 1903; Eastbourne, Sussex, England
- Died: 24 July 1988 (aged 85); Eastbourne, Sussex, England
- Batting: Right-handed
- Bowling: Right-arm medium

Domestic team information
- Years: Team
- 1923: Sussex

Career statistics
Competition	First-class
Matches	1
Runs scored	27
Batting average	13.50
100s/50s	–/–
Top score	27
Balls bowled	66
Wickets	–
Bowling average	–
5 wickets in innings	–
10 wickets in match	–
Best bowling	–
Catches/stumpings	–/–
- Source: Cricinfo, 30 June 2012

Frank Collins (3 February 1903 – 24 July 1988) was an English cricketer. Collins was a right-handed batsman who bowled right-arm medium pace. He was born at Eastbourne, Sussex.

Collins made a single first-class appearance for Sussex against Nottinghamshire at Trent Bridge in the 1923 County Championship. Nottinghamshire won the toss and elected to field first. Put into bat, Sussex made 259 all out in their first-innings, with Collins scoring 27 runs before he was the last man out, dismissed by Len Richmond. Nottinghamshire responded in their first-innings by making 294 all out, with Collins opening the bowling with Henry Roberts. Collins bowled eleven wicketless overs, conceding 33 runs. Sussex then made 169 all out in their second-innings, with Collins once again the last man out, dismissed this time for a duck by Sam Staples. The match ended as a draw. This was his only major appearance for Sussex.

He died at the town of his birth on 24 July 1988.
