= Barbara Woodhouse =

Irish-born English animal trainer (1910–1988)

- Woodhouse on the cover of her book No Bad Dogs The Woodhouse Way. The book title reflects her no bad dogs motto
- Born: Barbara Kathleen Vera Blackburn; 9 May 1910; Rathfarnham, Ireland
- Died: 9 July 1988 (aged 78); Buckinghamshire, England
- Education: Harper Adams University
- Occupation: Dog trainer
- Years active: 1951–1988
- Spouses: Allan George Mill (m. 1934–1937) Michael Woodhouse (m. 1940–1988)
- Children: 3

Barbara Kathleen Vera Woodhouse (née Blackburn; 9 May 1910 – 9 July 1988) was an Irish-born British dog trainer, author, horse trainer and television personality. Her 1980 television series Training Dogs the Woodhouse Way made her a household name. Among her catch phrases were "walkies" and "sit!" She was also known for her "no bad dogs" philosophy.

== Life and career ==
Barbara Blackburn was born on 9 May 1910 at St Columba's College in Rathfarnham, County Dublin, Ireland, to an Irish family. She grew up there until her father, the warden (headmaster) of the school, died suddenly in 1919.

As described in her autobiography, the family moved to Brighton, England, a few weeks later, and afterwards to Headington in Oxford, where Woodhouse attended Headington School. In 1926, she became the only female student at the Harper Adams Agricultural College in Shropshire.

After returning to Oxford to start Headington Riding School and Boarding Kennels, she married her first husband, Allan George Mill, in August 1934 and moved with him to spend more than three years in Argentina training horses. The marriage ended in divorce and she returned to Headington.

In the 1930s, Barbara became a dog breeder and ran kennels until about 1960. Meanwhile, she married a second husband, Michael Woodhouse, in 1940 and moved to Wiltshire and had three children, Pamela, Patrick and Judith. She first appeared on television as a contestant on What's My Line, where panellists failed to guess her occupation. She also appeared on CBS 60 Minutes. Her 1980 BBC series made her a television personality at the age of 70. She continued to appear on television regularly until her death in 1988.

Woodhouse's autobiographical books include Talking to Animals and No Bad Dogs. She firmly believed there were "no bad dogs", just bad owners and defined it to mean dogs without genetic problems:

Some people get dogs they don't deserve; hereditary faults play havoc with some dogs, and the poor owner can do nothing. I think if the faults are too great, it is kinder to put a bad dog to sleep after training and possibly veterinary advice have failed.

Woodhouse died on 9 July 1988, at the age of 78, after suffering from a stroke.

== Television series ==
- Training Dogs the Woodhouse Way
- Barbara Woodhouse's World of Horses and Ponies
- Barbara's Problem Dogs

== Publications ==
- Almost Human (1976) ISBN 0417027303
- Barbara's World of Horses and Ponies: Their Care and Training the Woodhouse Way (1984) ISBN 0671461419
- Barbara Woodhouse on How to Train Your Puppy ISBN 094895552X
- Barbara Woodhouse on How Your Dog Thinks ISBN 0948955627
- Barbara Woodhouse on Training Your Dog ISBN 0948955570
- Book of Ponies (1981) ISBN 0722657668
- Difficult Dogs (1957)
- Dog Training My Way (1954) ISBN 0900819081
- Encyclopedia of Dogs and Puppies (1978) ISBN 0812860136
- Just Barbara: My Story (1986) ISBN 0671462482
- No Bad Dogs: The Woodhouse Way (1982) ISBN 0671449621
- No bad dogs and know your dog (1978) ISBN 090081912X
- Talking to Animals (autobiography, 1954) ISBN 0812816609
- The A-To-Z of Dogs and Puppies (1972) ISBN 0812815157
- Walkies: Dog Training and Care the Woodhouse Way (1983) ISBN 0671468928
- The Complete Woodhouse Guide to Dog Training (1990) ISBN 0948955953
