= Roy Deller =

Australian rules footballer (1913–1988)

Personal information
- Full name: Roy Deller
- Born: 21 January 1913
- Died: 2 July 1988 (aged 75); Melbourne, Victoria, Australia
- Original team: Williamstown
- Height: 193 cm (6 ft 4 in)
- Position: Ruckman

Playing career^{1}
| Years | Club | Games (Goals) |
| 1936–37, 1944 | North Melbourne | 30 (6) |
| 1938 | Footscray | 2 (0) |
| Total | | 32 (6) |
- ^{1} Playing statistics correct to the end of 1938.

Career highlights
- Rich Homsey Trophy - Best and Fairest Player 1937, North Melbourne Football Club

Roy Deller (21 January 1913 – 2 July 1988) was an Australian rules footballer who played with North Melbourne and Footscray in the Victorian Football League (VFL).

Before transferring to North Melbourne, Deller played 71 senior games and kicked 7 goals for Williamstown in the VFA from 1930 to 1935 after being recruited from Spotswood. He played in a losing Williamstown Seconds grand final in 1929, the year before he made his senior debut.
