= Bandu Patil =

Indian field hockey player (1936–1988)

Medal record

Representing India

Men's field hockey

Olympic Games
| Gold medal – first place | 1964 Tokyo | Team |

Asian Games
| Silver medal – second place | 1962 Jakarta | Team |

Bandu Patil (January 1, 1936 – July 23, 1988) was an Indian hockey player. Bandu Patil represented the Indian Hockey team, which won Gold medal during 1964 Olympics.

He is from Belgaum. The Belgaum Cantonment had planned to rename the Khanapur road from Sanchayni Circle to Suryakant Park (Gogte circle) as Bandu Patil (He was a part of the gold medal-winning Indian hockey team in the 1960s) road, but it was later found that, the same road was named after Maj.Cariappa in the military records.

He played as inside left and for Services in the national championships. Patil died from cardiac arrest.

== Medals ==
- 1964 Tokyo Olympics- Gold
- 1962 Asian Games – Silver
