= Hap Allen =

American baseball player

- Infielder
- Born: August 23, 1900; Pittsburgh, Pennsylvania, U.S.
- Died: July 20, 1988 (aged 87); Pittsburgh, Pennsylvania, U.S.
- Threw: Right

Negro league baseball debut
- 1921, for the Pittsburgh Keystones

Last appearance
- 1922, for the Homestead Grays

Teams
- Pittsburgh Keystones (1921); Homestead Grays (1922)

John Francis Allen Jr. (August 23, 1900 – July 20, 1988), nicknamed "Hap", was an American Negro league infielder in the 1920s.

A native of Pittsburgh, Pennsylvania, Allen made his Negro leagues debut in 1921 with the Pittsburgh Keystones and played for the Homestead Grays the following season. He died in Pittsburgh in 1988 at age 87.
