= Alan Tait (Australian footballer) =

Personal information
- Full name: Alan Taylor Tait
- Born: 29 April 1891; Armadale, Victoria
- Died: 10 August 1969 (aged 78); Parkville, Victoria
- Original team: Ormond College / Geelong College

Playing career^{1}
Years	Club	Games (Goals)
1911	University	1 (0)
- ^{1} Playing statistics correct to the end of 1911.

Alan Taylor Tait MC (29 April 1891 – 10 August 1969) was an Australian educator, decorated World War I soldier and an Australian rules footballer who played with the University Football Club in the Victorian Football League (VFL).

The son of Rev. George Tait and Mary Agnes Sym, Alan Tait was born in the eastern part of Melbourne in 1891. He attended Geelong College from 1903 – 1908, being a School Prefect and a prominent member of its football, cricket and athletics teams. He then attended the University of Melbourne, and during 1911 made his single VFL appearance in a game against Collingwood where University failed to score a goal.

He was studying at the University of Edinburgh in 1914 and enlisted to serve in World War I with the Royal Scots. He served in France, and in April 1917, after receiving an officer's commission, was awarded the Military Cross, the citation, which appeared in The London Gazette in July 1918, reading as follows:

For conspicuous gallantry and devotion to duty in vacating, under orders, a position and withdrawing to a sunken road, and then retaking the same position in the face of a very heavy fire. He held this position until it became untenable and then was ordered to withdraw. His coolness was magnificent, and he showed himself a fine leader of men.

At the end of the war he returned to New College and completed his training as a theological student, and was licensed by the Presbytery of Edinburgh of the United Free Church of Scotland. Returning to Australia in 1919, he gained his Diploma of Education and married Dorothy Ada Tate in 1920. He joined the Geelong College staff in 1920 and later served as Vice-Principal from 1939 until his retirement in 1957.
