= James Connerty =

South African cricketer (1904–1988)

Personal information
- Born: 29 March 1904; Pretoria, Transvaal Colony
- Died: 27 July 1988 (aged 84); Durban, South Africa
- Source: Cricinfo, 17 December 2020

James Connerty (29 March 1904 – 27 July 1988) was a South African cricketer. He played in three first-class matches from 1920–21 to 1929–30.
