= John W. Schaum =

John W. Schaum (January 27, 1905 – July 18, 1988) was an American pianist, composer, and educator who was born and died in Milwaukee, Wisconsin.

== Education ==
Schaum received a Bachelor of Music degree from Marquette University in 1931, a Bachelor of Music Education degree from University of Wisconsin–Milwaukee, and a Master of Music degree from Northwestern University in 1934.

== Career ==
Schaum began his career as a piano teacher in the late 1920s. In 1933 he founded the Schaum Piano School in Milwaukee. About the same time he began to compose piano music for teaching purposes. He also founded the first company to produce award stickers specifically for music students. Always on the lookout for better materials for his students, Schaum eventually decided to create his own books, beginning in 1941 with Piano Fun for Boys and Girls, which he later revised as the first in a series of nine piano method books that became the Schaum Piano Course, completed in 1945. These books are still widely used today.

Over the course of his career, Schaum wrote many more books and hundreds of pieces of sheet music. His arrangement of the Marines' Hymn, issued during World War II, sold more than a million copies. Though he received only a fixed fee of $15 for this work, its success attracted the attention of Belwin Publications, for whom he went on to produce more than a hundred sheet music arrangements.

== Bibliography ==
=== John W. Schaum Piano Course: Leading to Mastery of the Instrument ===
John W. Schaum Piano Course: Book Pre A - The Green Book (1945)
John W. Schaum Piano Course: Book A - The Red Book (1945)
John W. Schaum Piano Course: Book B - The Blue Book (1945)
John W. Schaum Piano Course: Book C - The Purple Book (1945)
John W. Schaum Piano Course: Book D - The Orange Book (1945)
John W. Schaum Piano Course: Book E - The Violet Book (1945)
John W. Schaum Piano Course: Book F - The Brown Book (1945)
John W. Schaum Piano Course: Book G - The Grey Book (1945)

=== Schaum Making Music Piano Library ===
Making Music at the Piano: Book 1 (1962) Making Music at the Piano: Book 2 (1963) Making Music at the Piano: Book 3 (1963) Making Music at the Piano: Book 4 (1963) Making Music at the Piano: Book 5 (1964) Making Music at the Piano: Book 6 (1964) Making Music at the Piano: Book 7 (1964)

=== Arrangements ===
Festival Fugue by J.S. Bach (1946)

Sing-along, play-along Christmas Songs and Tunes for Piano and Other Keyboard Instruments arranged and edited by John W. Schaum (1959)

The Waltz Book: Solo Piano Albums for the Young Student (1955)
