= Gitta Alpár =

Hungarian opera singer (1903–1991)

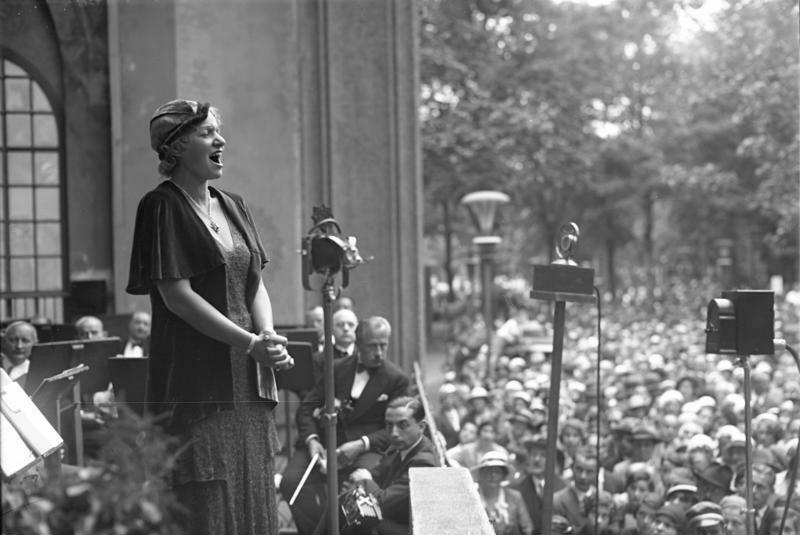
- Gitta Alpár at a charity performance, Berlin Zoo, 1932
- Born: Regina Klopfer; 5 February 1903; Budapest, Austria-Hungary
- Died: 17 February 1991 (aged 88); Los Angeles, California, U.S
- Occupation: Actress
- Years active: 1923–1941
- Spouse: Gustav Fröhlich 1931–1935

Gitta Alpár (born Regina Klopfer; 5 February 1903 – 17 February 1991), was a Hungarian-born opera and operetta soprano.

== Biography ==
Gitta Alpár was born in Budapest, the daughter of a Jewish cantor. At an early age, she commenced the study of singing and pianoforte at the Academy of Budapest. Her first public appearance as a coloratura soprano under the name of Alpár was in 1923 at the Budapest State Opera House. The debut marked the beginning of a long career, promoted by eminent conductors such as Erich Kleiber, which led her singing at the great opera houses of Vienna, Berlin, and all over the world. An ensemble member of the Berlin State Opera from 1927 to 1930, she excelled in performances of Mozart's The Magic Flute, Rossini's The Barber of Seville, as well as in Verdi's Rigoletto and La Traviata.

In 1931, Alpár married actor Gustav Fröhlich, with whom she had a child, Julika. Her first films were made in Germany. The marriage was dissolved in 1935 because Alpár was Jewish and the marriage was illegal in Nazi Germany. Alpár appeared on "Hitler's hit list", along with Charlie Chaplin and others, in the pages of the anti-semitic book, Juden sehen Dich an by Johann von Leers.

Alpár left Germany in 1933, first for Austria (where the film version of Ball im Savoy was made) and Hungary, then England and eventually the United States, where she continued her singing and film career. She died in Los Angeles, California, and was buried in the Westwood Memorial Park, Los Angeles.

== Roles created ==
- 1930: Princess Elisabeth in Schön ist die Welt, a reworking of Endlich allein by Franz Lehár
- 1931: Comtesse Dubarry in the revised version of Gräfin Dubarry by Millöcker
- 1932: Madeleine de Faublas in the operetta Ball im Savoy by Paul Abraham

== Recordings ==
- Lebendige Vergangenheit – Gitta Alpár: includes arias and excerpts by Félicien-César David, Delibes, Eva Dell'Acqua, Ruggero Leoncavallo, Meyerbeer, Mozart, Offenbach, Puccini, Rossini, and Verdi (1996, Preiser Records 1083891)

== Films ==
- Gitta Discovers Her Heart (1932)
- This One or None (1932)
- Ball at the Savoy (1935)
- I Give My Heart (1935)
- Disk 413 (1935)
- Guilty Melody (1936)
- Everything in Life (1936)
- Mr. Stringfellow Says No (1937)
- The Flame of New Orleans (1941)

== See also ==
- Alpár – Hungarian surname
