= Training Dogs the Woodhouse Way =

- Presented by: Barbara Woodhouse
- Country of origin: United Kingdom
- Original language: English
- No. of episodes: 10

Production
- Producer: Peter Riding
- Production company: BBC

Original release
- Network: BBC2
- Release: 7 January – 10 March 1980

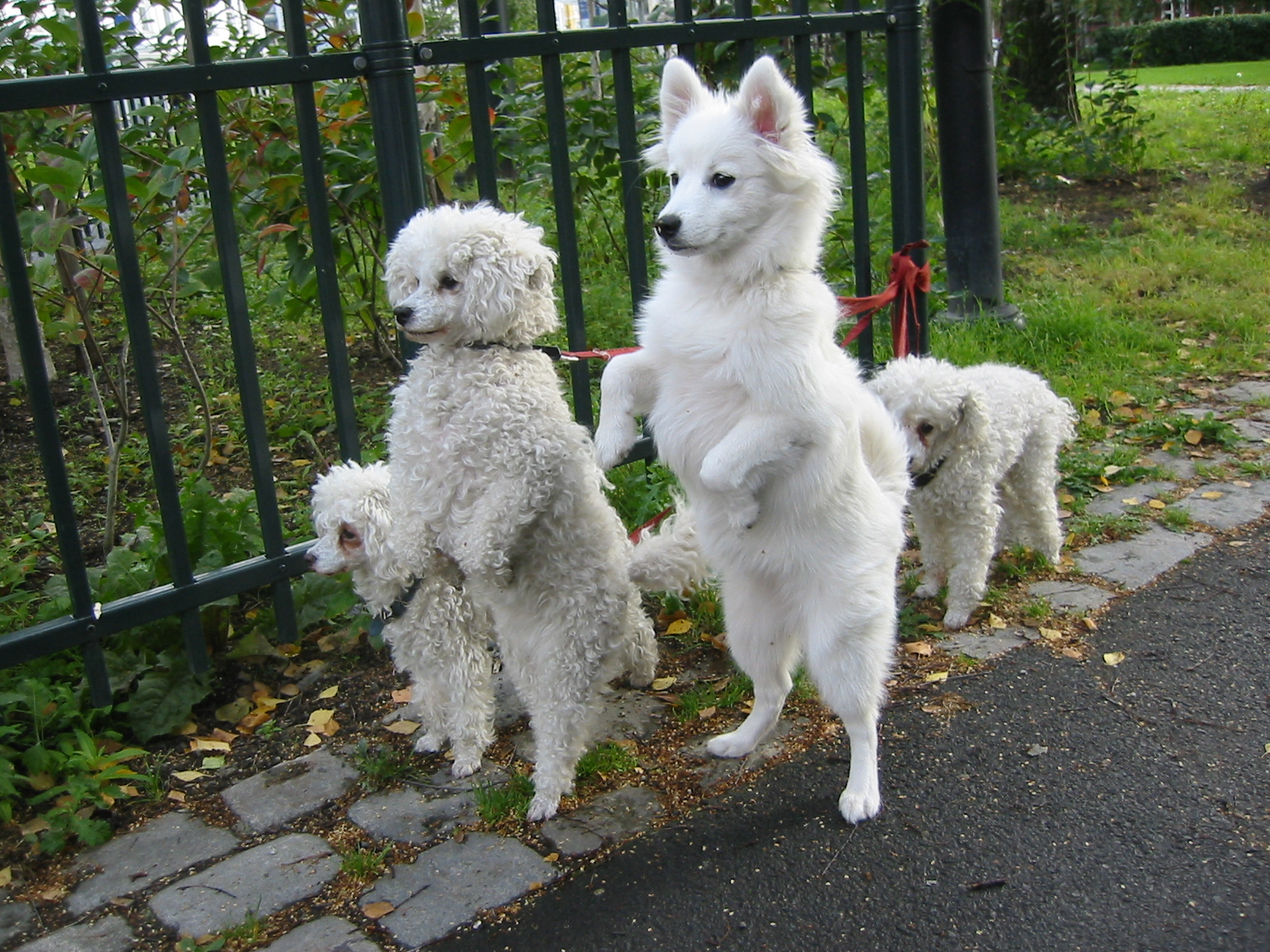

Training Dogs the Woodhouse Way is a British television series presented by Barbara Woodhouse first shown by the BBC in 1980. It was taped in 10 episodes at Woodhouse's home in Hertfordshire, England. The show was also internationally syndicated.

In the show she often used two commands: "walkies" and "sit"; the latter of which was parodied in the 1983 James Bond film Octopussy where James Bond does a Woodhouse impersonation, puts his hand up in a command posture, repeats Woodhouse's catch-phrase to a tiger and the animal responds to it by obeying. Her ten-part series had been shown at over one hundred stations in the United States and in Britain it proved so popular it was run twice. In 1982, singer-songwriter Randy Edelman wrote a song about her and her show, "Barbara (The Woodhouse Way)", which he released in a single 45 rpm record.

== Summary ==
The series was produced by Peter Riding and first shown on BBC2 between 7 January and 10 March 1980. It made Woodhouse famous and enabled her to popularise her dog-training ideas widely among pet owners in Britain and abroad. She believed that there is no such thing as a bad dog but simply inadequate owners who did not assert their position in the pecking order of dog society. Her approach influenced other dog trainers such as Victoria Stilwell, who advocated similar ideas on her show It's Me or the Dog. Although her show was very popular, her advocacy for better-designed and more humane cages for dog transportation was slow in gaining widespread acceptance. In her show she was known for issuing abrupt commands to the owners, and for her on-air criticism of their behaviour. More often than not, the owners looked terrified rather than the dogs.

== Reception ==
The show achieved cult status in the United States and millions of people accommodated their schedule around the showtimes of its broadcast in a similar manner to the successful Upstairs Downstairs. At the same time they widely and cheerfully adopted her vocabulary using her commands "walkies" and "sit". The show was broadcast in the United States by PBS in 1983.
