= Alan Tait (English cricketer) =

English cricketer (born 1953)

Personal information
- Born: 27 December 1953 (age 72); Washington, County Durham, England
- Batting: Left-handed
- Role: Batsman

Domestic team information
- Years: Team
- 1971–1975: Northamptonshire
- 1978: Gloucestershire

Career statistics
| Competition | FC | List A |
|---|---|---|
| Matches | 63 | 42 |
| Runs scored | 1897 | 834 |
| Batting average | 18.41 | 20.85 |
| 100s/50s | 0/12 | 1/1 |
| Top score | 99 | 102* |
| Balls bowled |
| Wickets |
| Bowling average |
| 5 wickets in innings |
| 10 wickets in match |
| Best bowling |
| Catches/stumpings |
- Source: Cricinfo, 30 July 2013

Alan Tait (born 27 December 1953) is a former English cricketer. He played for Northamptonshire between 1971 and 1975 and for Gloucestershire in 1978.
