= Ivo Šuprina =

Croatian footballer (1921–1988)

Personal information
- Full name: Ivan Šuprina
- Date of birth: 1 October 1921
- Place of birth: Zagreb, Kingdom of Yugoslavia
- Date of death: 13 July 1988 (aged 66)
- Position: Striker

Senior career*
Years	Team	Apps	(Gls)
1938–1944	Građanski Zagreb		
1945–1946	Dinamo Zagreb		
1946–1947	Lyon		
1947–1948	Strasbourg	18	(10)
1948–1951	Napoli	64	(21)

International career
1940	Banovina of Croatia	3	(0)
1943	Independent State of Croatia	1	(0)
- * Club domestic league appearances and goals

Ivan "Ivo" Šuprina (1 October 1921 – 13 July 1988) was a Croatian international footballer who professionally throughout Europe as a striker during the 1940s.

== Career ==
Born in Zagreb, Šuprina began his career in his native Croatia for hometown clubs Građanski Zagreb and Dinamo Zagreb. He later played in France for Lyon and Strasbourg; during his time in France he was known as Yvon Šuprina'. Šuprina also played in Italy for Napoli.

== International career ==
Šuprina made his debut for the Banovina of Croatia in an April 1940 friendly match against Switzerland and earned a total of 4 caps, scoring no goals. He played the last one of these games under the flag of the Independent State of Croatia, a World War II-era puppet state of Nazi Germany.
