= Jarava Lal Mehta =

Indian philosopher

- Born: 1912
- Died: 11 July 1988 (aged 75–76)

Philosophical work
- Era: 20th century Philosophy
- Region: Western philosophy, Indian philosophy
- School: Continental
- Main interests: Existentialism, hermeneutics
- Notable ideas: reconciling Eastern and Western thought

Jarava Lal Mehta (1912 – 11 July 1988) (alternatively spelt Jadav Lal Mehta) was an Indian philosopher, and expert on the philosophy of Martin Heidegger.

He was a professor at the Central Hindu College of Banaras Hindu University, Center for the Study of World Religions of Harvard Divinity School (1968–1969, 1970–1971, September 1973 – January 1979) and the University of Hawaiʻi (1971–1973).

== Bibliography ==
- Philosophy of Martin Heidegger, Harper & Row, 1971
- Martin Heidegger: the Way and the Vision, University of Hawaiʻi Press, 1976
- India and the West: The Problem of Understanding, Scholars Press, 1985
- J.L. Mehta on Heidegger, Hermeneutics and Indian Tradition, edited by William J. Jackson, Brill Academic Pub, 1992
- Philosophy and religion: Essays in interpretation, Indian Council of Philosophical Research and Munshiram Manoharlal Publishers, 1990
- Kavikarma aura cintana: Sarjana ke do ayama (Hirananda Shastri vyakhyanamala) (Hindi Edition), National Publishing House, New Delhi, 1986
