= Leopold Casper =

German physician and urologist

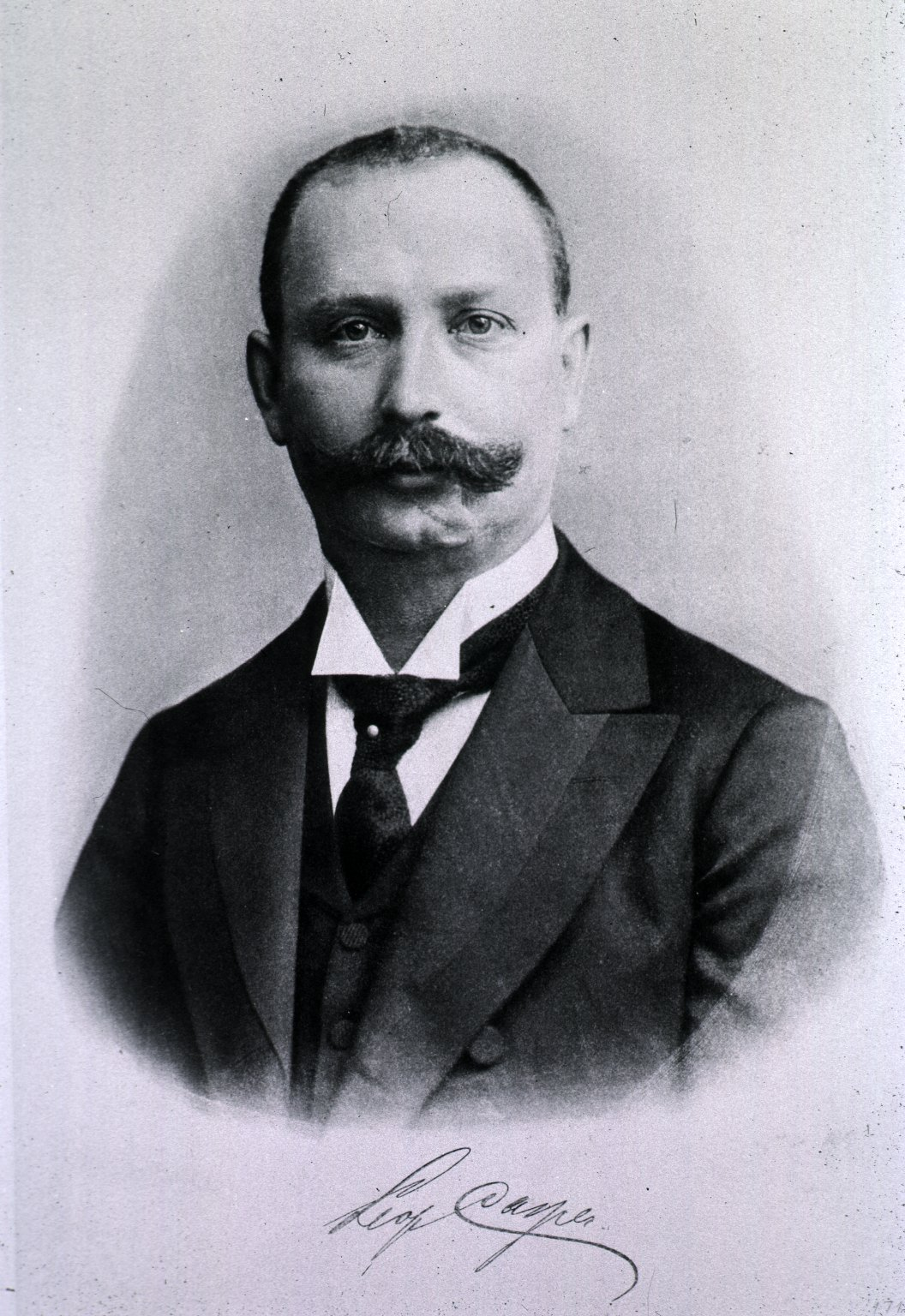
Leopold Casper (1859–1959)

Leopold Casper (31 May 1859 – 16 March 1959) was a German physician and urologist born in Berlin.

He studied medicine in Berlin, London and Vienna, earning his doctorate from the University of Berlin in 1883. He received his habilitation in 1892, and in 1922 became an associate professor of urology. Due to his Jewish heritage, he fled Nazi Germany in 1933 and eventually settled in New York City (1941). He died in New York on March 16, 1959, a few months short of his 100th birthday.

Casper is remembered for the introduction of functional kidney diagnostics into urological medicine. Also, he is credited for introducing a specialized cystoscope for ureteral catheterization. He was an editor of the journal Zeitschrift für Urologie.

In 1906 he was a founding member of the German Urological Society (DGfU). Among his written works was a textbook on urology that was translated into English and augmented by Charles W. Bonney (translation of "Lehrbuch der Urologie mit Einschluss der männlichen Sexualerkrankungen" as "A text-book of genito-urinary diseases, including functional sexual disorders in man", 1906).
