= Motor Cycling (magazine) =

British motorcycle magazine

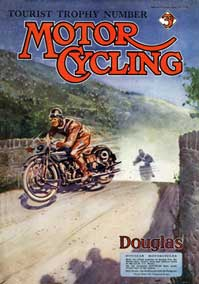
- Editor: Norman Sharpe 1964 to 1967
- Former editors: Bob Holliday 1954 to 1964, Graham Walker 1938 to 1954
- Staff writers: Bruce Main-Smith, Mick Woollett, Graham Forsdyke, Mike Bashford
- Categories: Motorcycles
- Frequency: Weekly
- Publisher: Temple Press
- Founded: 1910
- Final issue: 1967
- Country: UK
- Based in: London
- Language: English

Motor Cycling was the first British motorcycle magazine. It was launched in 1902 by Temple Press as an offshoot of Motor magazine. It was withdrawn after a few months but relaunched in 1909. The Motor Cycle—which was launched by Iliffe in April 1903—coined the slogan on its masthead: "Established in 1903 and for over six years the only paper solely devoted to the pastime". the front covers often had varying degree of green background, green or contrasting text and B&W illustrations or photographic images. This common theme resulted in almost a 'trademark' appearance, being called "The Green 'un", distinguishing it from its rival publication The Motor Cycle which had variation on blue background colouring with contrasting text and images ("The Blue 'un").

== Early years ==
Graham Walker edited the magazine from 1938 to 1954. He was a dispatch rider in the First World War and had a successful racing career with Rudge, Sunbeam, and Norton, winning the Ulster Grand Prix in 1928. He rode many times in the Isle of Man TT, winning the lightweight (250cc) class in 1931, and became president of the TT Riders Association. He was also the father of racing commentator Murray Walker.

Many issues throughout the 1940s and 1950s had the strapline "Read wherever motorcycles are ridden!"

== Later years ==
Motor Cycling with Scooter Weekly, 2 April 1959

In 1959 it became Motor Cycling with Scooter Weekly. The magazine continued until 1962 when it changed to newspaper format, later merging in 1967 with Motor Cycle which had hitherto remained as magazine format.

Traditionally, Motor Cycling had a sporting-bias whilst Motor Cycle had more of a technical grounding. In his first-page article of the last magazine-format of Motor Cycle dated 3 August 1967, editor-in-chief of the new venture Harry Louis stated:

"Besides bringing two famous, long-established publications together, we are uniting the star writers on both into one team operating from Dorset House. These enthusiasts who, basically all-rounders but with specialized interests when they punch their typewriters, form the most experienced, knowledgeable and liveliest bunch of motor-cycling journalists ever in our field."

The two publications continued as one in the newspaper format, initially using the name Motor Cycle Incorporating Motor Cycling under Motor Cycle publishers Iliffe Specialist Publications Ltd.

"The printing will be by the latest process, web-offset, which gives much brighter reproduction of pictures than has been possible in the past. With about twice as much space as in this issue, the new Motor Cycle brings you all the features you expect plus much more extensive coverage of sport and news."

Motor Cycling was dropped from the title. Some staff had transferred over to the new venture, whilst others went freelance, such as former staff-writer and racing enthusiast Bruce Main-Smith who had a very successful career including as a publisher of his own motorcycling books which business he sold, including rights to use the name, in 1991 when retiring. This business operated using the name Bruce Main-Smith & Company Ltd. up to 2013, with the business becoming associated with The National Motorcycle Museum during 2014.

Mick Woollet stayed, becoming sports editor, eventually progressing to editor of Motor Cycle which was later renamed Motor Cycle Weekly prior to closure in 1983. Woollett was already involved in The Classic Motor Cycle and went on to other projects under IPC magazines and IPC Press.

A publication having a similar name – Motor Cycling Weekly, in the newspaper format – was established by some former staff after closure of Motor Cycle/Motor Cycle Weekly including Nick Harris, who later became a motor sport television commentator. Several issues only were sold in the UK during late 1983 and early 1984 before abandonment of the project.

== See also ==
- List of adventure motorcycling books
