= The Classic Motor Cycle =

UK motorcycle magazine

The Classic MotorCycle
- The first issue, June/July 1981
- Editor: James Robinson
- Former editors: Bob Currie
- Categories: Motorcycles
- Frequency: Monthly
- Circulation: 78,993
- Publisher: Kelsey Media Ltd from 2025; Mortons Media Group Ltd from 1998; EMAP from 1983; IPC Specialist and Business Press Ltd from 1981
- Founded: 1981
- Company: Mortons Media Group Ltd
- Country: UK
- Based in: Horncastle Lincolnshire
- Language: English
- Website: www.classicmotorcycle.co.uk
- ISSN: 0263-0850

The Classic MotorCycle is a UK motorcycle magazine originally launched in 1981 with six editions a year as a spin-off from UK newspaper-format Motor Cycle Weekly (previously historically known as The Motor Cycle) as under then Editor-in-Chief Mick Woollett at IPC, Surrey House, Sutton, Surrey.

Editor and driving-force Bob Currie based at Lynton House, Birmingham, was historically a senior contributor in the 1960s to Motor Cycle (renamed from The Motor Cycle in 1962) with the title of Midland Editor, and during the 1970s with the same publication, by then using the name Motor Cycle Weekly.

Having well-established archival links to The Motor Cycle which itself had origins back to 1903, the first edition was dated June/July 1981.

As had occurred with (The) Motor Cycle, The Classic Motor Cycle title changed hands several times, being originally published by IPC Business Press between 1981 and 1983, then by East Midland Allied Press (EMAP) from 1984. Purchased in 1998 by Mortons Media Group, it is now published by their subsidiary Mortons Motorcycle Media. Featuring all marques of classic motorcycles with an emphasis on racing and performance bikes, editor James Robinson says he is "not just interested in classics, but in all manner of motorcycles and motorcycle-related sport."

Mortons Media Group Ltd and it's magazine titles, including The Classic MotorCycle, were acquired by Kelsey Media in March 2025.

== Features ==
The magazines contains articles on classic motorcycles, technical articles, and regular features including:

- Archive photographs
- News from the world of classic motorcycles
- Featured classic bikes
- Product reviews
- Technical features
- In the spotlight
- Profiles of famous motorcyclists
- You were asking (readers questions)
- Buyers Guide
- Diary and classic motorcycle events
