= The Motor Cycle =

British magazine

- The Motor Cycle, known as The Blue 'un
- Editor-in-Chief: Arthur Bourne
- Editor: Harry Louis
- Editor: Mick Woollett
- Staff writers: David Dixon, 1959-1971
- Categories: Motorcycles
- Frequency: Weekly
- Publisher: lliffe and Sons Ltd lliffe Specialist Press Ltd; IPC Specialist and Business Press Ltd
- First issue: March 1903
- Final issue: October 1983
- Country: United Kingdom
- Based in: Dorset House, Stamford Street, London; Surrey House, Throwley Way, Sutton, Surrey.
- Language: English

The Motor Cycle was one of the first British magazines about motorcycles. Launched by Iliffe and Sons Ltd in 1903, its blue cover led to it being called "The Blue 'un" to help distinguish it from its rival publication Motor Cycling, which, using a green background colour, was known as "The Green 'un". Many issues carried the strapline "Circulated throughout the World".

The covers eventually used a variety of different background colours after 1962, with a name-change to Motor Cycle.

== Features ==
Noted for detailed road tests of contemporary motorcycles and articles on readers' bikes, the magazine had regular features, including "Current Chat" and "Letters to the Editor" where many of the key issues relating to British motorcycling of the day were debated. The contributors often signed their pieces with pseudonyms such as Torrens (Arthur Bourne, one of the Editors) and the famous Ixion (Canon B.H. Davies).

== Recent history ==
Example front cover Masthead logo of Title changed to Motor Cycle and change of colour away from just blue.

From 1962, 'The' was dropped from the title, being then simply known as Motor Cycle. Regular features developed such as 'On the Four Winds' by Nitor and 'Racing Line' by David Dixon in addition to many different trends, with a readers' write-in 'Help Club', technical articles, stripdowns and repair sequences, new model analysis, practical road riding, accessories, clubs and rallying.

As a magazine-format, space was limited and although road-race and off-road sport reportage was always present, Motor Cycle enjoyed a reputation more as a technically based periodical.

1967 saw a merger with some elements of underperforming rival Motor Cycling which had already changed to broadsheet newspaper format in 1962, leaving Motor Cycle as a compact magazine with limited page-space.

Facsimile-masthead from internal pages of last magazine produced in 1967, part of editorial announcement of the merger

With the merger came the opportunity to change into newspaper format. Harry Louis, editor of Motor Cycle, stated in the last magazine format dated 3 August 1967:

"You'll get it a day earlier, on Wednesdays. The printing will be by the latest process, web-offset, which gives much brighter reproduction of pictures than has been possible in the past. With about twice as much space as in this issue, the new Motor Cycle brings you all the features you expect plus much more extensive coverage of sport and news."

Traditionally, Motor Cycling had a sporting-bias whilst Motor Cycle had more of a technical grounding. Under the new venture Motor Cycle incorporating Motor Cycling, former Motor Cycling Editor Norman Sharpe was installed as the new editor with Harry Louis enjoying the title of Editor-in-Chief

Louis stated in his first-page article of the last magazine-format of Motor Cycle:

"Besides bringing two famous, long-established publications together, we are uniting the star writers on both into one team operating from Dorset House.

These enthusiasts who, basically all-rounders but with specialized interests when they punch their typewriters, form the most experienced, knowledgeable and liveliest bunch of motor-cycling journalists ever in our field."

Some staff transferred over to the new venture. Particularly successful was Mick Woollett who became sports editor, eventually progressing to editor of Motor Cycle which was later renamed Motor Cycle Weekly.

Example front cover Masthead logo of Title changed to Motor Cycle Weekly and change of colour to orange.

Woollett then was involved in The Classic Motor Cycle and other projects under IPC magazines.

The two publications continued as one in the newspaper format, initially under the name Motor Cycle Incorporating Motor Cycling under Motor Cycle publishers Iliffe Specialist Publications Ltd.

Stalwart 'Motor Cycle' staffman David Dixon (1933–2013) – a specialist road-race and road-test reporter and successful endurance racer – continued-on with the merged staff from 1967 bút left by 1971 to establish a road-race school – Dixon Robb Racing – in conjunction with successful 1950s and 1960s racer Tommy Robb.

By 1973 Dixon had established his own retail concern – Dixon Racing – with a shop at High Street, Godalming. Specialising in importing to the UK tuning products for the rapidly expanding Japanese superbike range, he established a long-standing arrangement with Yoshimura, with products initially concentrated on the Honda CB350, CB500 and CB750 machines. By the end of the same decade, Dixon Racing became the UK concessionaires (importer) for the early Bimota frame kits – 'KB1' for Kawasaki 1000, 'SB1' for Suzuki 1000 and 'HB2' for Honda 900 donor engines. Dixon died in 2013.

== Fate ==
Motor Cycle Weekly continued as newspaper-format until 1983 when it reverted to magazine-format. After less than a year as a 'glossy' it was closed.

Some former staff established Motor Cycling Weekly, in a newspaper format, during late November 1983. Echoing the change in 1967 when Motor Cycle ceased as a Thursday publication to match rival Motorcycle News on Wednesdays, Motor Cycling Weekly was pitched to reach the newsstands on Tuesday, having the strapline "First with the news...and first every week!".

Issues were sold in the UK during late 1983 and 1984 before abandonment of the project.
