= Brian McDonald (Australian footballer) =

Australian rules footballer

Personal information
- Full name: Brian John McDonald
- Born: 3 September 1927; Collingwood, Victoria
- Died: 14 July 1988 (aged 60); Moonee Ponds, Victoria
- Original team: Port Melbourne
- Height: 172 cm (5 ft 8 in)
- Weight: 70 kg (154 lb)

Playing career^{1}
Years	Club	Games (Goals)
1950–51	South Melbourne	11 (6)
- ^{1} Playing statistics correct to the end of 1951.

Brian John McDonald (3 September 1927 – 14 July 1988) was an Australian rules footballer who played with South Melbourne in the Victorian Football League (VFL).

Brian's inclusion at South Melbourne is documented in the Argus article "1950's Crop of New League Players Looks Good".

McDonald was also a professional runner, winning the 1956 Dandenong Gift in the lead up to the Stawell Gift.
