= Sefton Internment Camp =

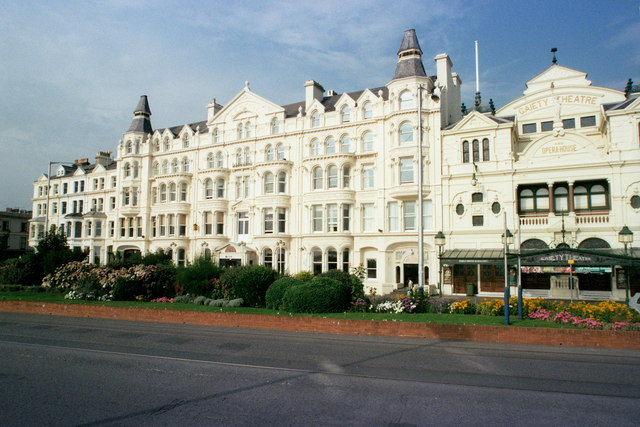
The Sefton Hotel today, next to the Gaiety Theatre

Sefton Camp was one of the World War II internment camps in the Isle of Man, where Italian, German and Finnish residents of Britain were held.

The camp was located in the Sefton Buildings, built during the 1890s next to the Gaiety Theatre, on the promenade in Douglas. It was one of the smallest of the ten internment camps on the island during World War II, with only 307 residents. Of these, 42 were invalids.

The Sefton Camp held prisoners from October 1940 until March 1941.

The camp had a newspaper, the Sefton Review, published fortnightly from November 1940 to 3 February 1941. Notable editorial pieces concern its letters sent to notable politicians and public figures to try to find a sympathetic ear for their plight. It also wrote to the Mayor of Coventry offering toys as gifts to families stricken by the bombings. The letter received a kindly reply.

The camp closed around the beginning of April 1941 due to the relatively large numbers of internees who had been released since the start of the internment camps on the island. The internees there who were not due for release were transferred to other camps on the island. The Home Office then informed the Sefton Hotel Company, and tenants of the Church Road houses, that they could have their property back on 4 May 1941.

== See also ==
Category: People interned in the Isle of Man during World War II
