= Alan Tait (Australian cricketer) =

Australian cricketer (1908–1988)

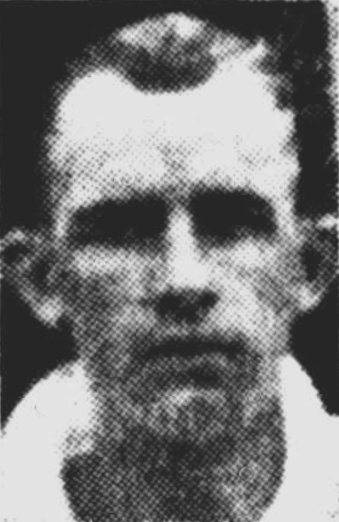

Personal information
- Full name: Alan Houston Tait
- Born: 17 February 1908; Toowoomba, Queensland, Australia
- Died: 27 July 1988 (aged 80); Indooroopilly, Queensland, Australia
- Batting: Left-handed
- Bowling: Right fast-medium
- Source: Cricinfo, 8 October 2020

Alan Tait (17 February 1908 – 27 July 1988) was an Australian cricketer. He played in five first-class matches for Queensland between 1933 and 1935.

== Cricket career ==
Tait began his career as an all-rounder who opened the bowling for the Past Grammars side in the Townsville Cricket competition and in the 1930/31 season he took 14 wickets at an average of 25.29 and was selected as twelfth man in a combined Townsville and Far North Queensland XI which played the New South Wales First-class team. A Townsville Cricket Association review of the 1931/32 season noted he was one of the most successful junior players in the competition excelling as an all-rounder for Past Grammars and also serving as Townsville's main bowler for a combined side. In September 1932 he was described as the "outstanding all-rounder" for the opening round of the 1932/33 Townsville cricket season, and he scored a century in late September. He was selected for a combined North Queensland team which competed in the Country Cricket Week carnival in Brisbane in October 1932.

In December 1933 Tait made his First-class debut for Queensland playing against Victoria in Brisbane. He was selected primarily for his bowling but impressed with the bat in the first innings scoring 61. He was subsequently selected for the Queensland State squad to travel to Sydney, Melbourne, and Adelaide, which was reported to have caused much pleasure for local Townsville cricketers. He arrived back in Townsville from touring the southern states in January 1934, and although he was selected to represent Queensland at home against South Australia that month he declined the selection as he was unable to arrange for leave from work to travel to Brisbane. Overall he scored 114 runs at an average of 19.00 with one 50 and took 5 wickets at 52.00 in his four First-class matches for the 1933/34 season.

In 1934/35 the Townsville Cricket Association noted that it was unfortunate that Tait was unavailable to represent Townsville at the Country Cricket Week carnival in its review of the season. In November 1935 a report noted that the State side lacked bowling options and it was suggested by the Brisbane Telegraph that Tait may be recalled to the state team as he had been in great form in Townsville cricket, although it was also noted he had been a failure as a bowler in his First-class games. He was recalled for the opening Queensland First-class match of the 1935/36 season in Brisbane, mainly because no other bowlers had impressed in the Country Cricket Week carnival, however his selection was met with some criticism, and he failed to perform in the game taking just 1 wicket and conceding 139 runs.

Tait continued playing for Past Grammars in Townsville cricket through the late 1930s, and in 1940 he began opening the bowling for Past Grammars again. In 1950 a report on the state of Townsville cricket noted that the league was missing players who thrilled spectators, and mentioned Tait as a former player who had done so.

== See also ==
- List of Queensland first-class cricketers
