= Silhouettes (film) =

1936 film

- Directed by: Lotte Reiniger; Walter Reisch
- Written by: Walter Reisch
- Produced by: Walter Reisch
- Starring: Liesl Handl; Luli Deste; Annie Markart
- Cinematography: Harry Stradling
- Edited by: Leopoldine Pokorny
- Music by: Robert Katscher
- Production company: Rex-Film
- Distributed by: Rex-Film
- Release date: 26 August 1936
- Running time: 104 minutes
- Country: Austria
- Language: German

Silhouettes (German: Silhouetten) is a 1936 Austrian mystery drama film directed by Lotte Reiniger and Walter Reisch and starring Liesl Handl, Luli Deste and Annie Markart. It was shot at the Rosenhügel Studios in Vienna. The film's sets were designed by the art director Otto Niedermoser. It premiered at the 1936 Venice Film Festival. It was the last film Reisch made in Austria before emigrating to the United States.

== Cast ==
- Liesl Handl as Leni Leitner & Tänzerin
- Luli Deste as Lydia Sanina
- Annie Markart as Ellinor
- Fred Hennings as Charlie West
- Frauke Lauterbach as Camilla
- Lili Marberg as Fräulein Munk
- Fritz Imhoff as Leopold Kaltenbrunner
- Eduard Köck as Direktor Leitner
- Karl Skraup as Anton Heizinger
- Hedy Pfundmeyer as Toinette
- Mila Cirul as Tänzerin
- Toni Birkmayer as Sascha
- Willy Fränzl as Tänzer
- Liesl Temple as Tänzerin
- Irma Eckert as Tänzerin
- Ferdinand Mayerhofer as Bibliothekar

== Bibliography ==
- Von Dassanowsky, Robert. Screening Transcendence: Film Under Austrofascism and the Hollywood Hope, 1933-1938. Indiana University Press, 2018
