= Edmund Eysler =

Austrian composer

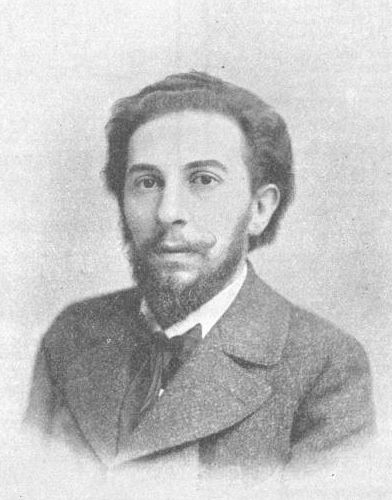
- Edmund Eysler, Vienna, March 1903
- Born: Edmund Samuel Eysler; 12 March 1874; Hernals, Austria (until 1892 an independent municipality, since then a district of Vienna)
- Died: 4 October 1949 (aged 75); Vienna, Austria
- Occupation: composer
- Known for: Die gold’ne Meisterin

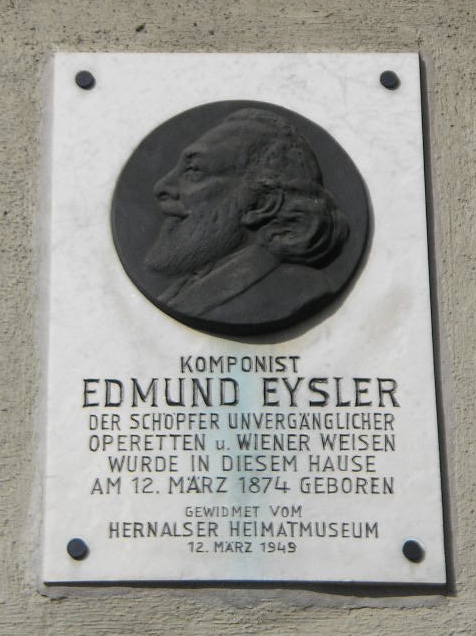
Memorial plaque at his birth house Thelemangasse 8 in Hernals

Edmund Samuel Eysler (12 March 1874 – 4 October 1949), was an Austrian composer.

== Biography ==
Edmund Eysler was born in Vienna to a merchant family. He was supposed to enter the engineering profession, but his acquaintance with Leo Fall led him to study music at the Vienna Conservatory, where he studied composition under Robert Fuchs, and became educated as a piano teacher and Kapellmeister. After completing his degree with many plaudits, Eysler made ends meet by teaching piano.

In 1898, he married Poldi Allnoch, with whom he had two daughters, and in 1901, he found a position as a Kapellmeister. After that, he composed chamber music and piano pieces, as well as the opera Fest auf Solhaug (Celebration on Solhaug), and the ballet Schlaraffenland.

Through a magnanimous relative, Eysler met the librettist Ignaz Schnitzer, who was compiling the text for Zigeunerbaron (Gypsy King). Eysler was given the task of setting this text to the opera Der Hexenspiegel (The Witches' Mirror) by Schnitzer. Originally, the work was supposed to be staged at the Vienna Court Opera upon completion, but it was spurned by the director for having overly simple music. Josef Weinberger encouraged Eysler to turn the music for Hexenspiegel into an operetta. It became the operetta Bruder Straubinger, which was a big success on its premiere on 20 February 1903, with Alexander Girardi in the main role.

Eysler composed the operetta Der unsterbliche Lump (The Immortal Blight), with a libretto by Felix Dörmann, for the Vienna Bürgertheater. On 14 October 1910, this work was performed for the first time, with overwhelming success. Critics claimed Eysler's operetta signalled a change in the genre. The composer's music was praised, especially the solid instrumentation and the simple harmonies. The success ensured that Eysler remained the Bürgertheater's "house composer". On 23 December 1911, his newest operetta, Der Frauenfresser (The Woman-Eater) was also well received. This was followed by the premiere of Der lachende Ehemann (The laughing groom) in March 1913. What was especially well received by reviewers were the catchy, unpretentious melodies. This work had been performed 1793 times by 1921. Even during the years of World War I, more and more of Eysler's operettas were staged at the Vienna Bürgertheater every season, such as Frühling am Rhein (Rhine Spring), Die – oder Keine! (That One – Or No One) und Der dunkle Schatz (The Dark Treasure). After the end of World War I, Eysler published one further, very successful operetta, Die gold’ne Meisterin (The Golden Mistress), which was very successful in Vienna.

Due to Eysler's Jewish background, his works were banned from being performed by the Nazis, leading Adolf Hitler to discover that his favourite operetta, Die gold'ne Meisterin, was composed by a Jew. Instead of fleeing immediately, he found shelter with relatives and friends. The title of Honoured Citizen of Vienna gave him a certain protection. After the war, he achieved his last great success with the operetta Wiener Musik (Viennese Music), which premiered on 22 December 1947 at the Bürgertheater. For his 75th birthday, he was given the Ring of Honour by the city, and the memorial plaque on his birthplace in Thelemanngasse, which had been removed during the time of the Nazis, was reinstated.

Eysler died on 4 October 1949, in Vienna as a consequence of a fall from the stage, and was buried in a grave of honour at the central graveyard in Vienna. With a total of 60 operettas, Eysler's influence in shaping the Austrian music environment of the time was felt very strongly. International success was less forthcoming because Eysler's music was Vienna-centric and based on local folklore.

== Awards ==
- Bürger ehrenhalber der Stadt Wien (conferred on 7 October 1927) (Honoured Citizen of the City of Vienna)
- Träger des Goldenen Ehrenzeichens der Republik Österreich (conferred on 27 March 1934) (Bearer of the Golden Symbol of Honour of the Republic of Austria)
- Ehrenring der Stadt Wien (conferred in 1949) (Ring of Honour of the City of Vienna)
- Eyslergasse, Wien-Hietzing (1955)

== Selected works ==
=== Operas ===
- Der Hexenspiegel (1900) (The Witches' Mirror)
- Fest auf Solhaug (Celebration on Solhaug)

=== Operettas ===
- Das Gastmahl des Lucullus (1901) (Lucullus' Banquet)
- Bruder Straubinger (1903) (Brother Straubinger)
- Die Schützenliesel (1905)
- Pufferl (Amor di Principe) (1905)
- Künstlerblut (1906) (Artists' Blood)
- Vera Violetta (1907)
- Das Glücksschweinchen (1908) (The Lucky Pig)
- Johann der Zweite (1908) adapted on Broadway as The June Bride
- Der unsterbliche Lump (1910) (The Undying Blight)
- Das Zirkuskind (1911) (The Circus Child)
- Der Frauenfresser (1911) (The Woman-Eater)
- Ein Tag im Paradies (1913) (One Day in Paradise; adapted on Broadway as The Blue Paradise)
- Der lachende Ehemann (1913) (The Laughing Groom)
- Hanni geht tanzen! (1916) (Hanni Goes Dancing!)
- Die fromme Helene (1921) (Pious Helene)
- Die gold'ne Meisterin (1927) (The Golden Mistress)
- Donauliebchen (1932) (Danube Sweetheart)
- Wiener Musik (1947) (Viennese Music)
