= Aschenbrödel =

Ballet by Johann Strauss II

- Choreographer: Emil Graeb
- Music: Johann Strauss II; Josef Bayer
- Premiere: 2 May 1901; Berlin
- Original ballet company: Berlin Royal Opera
- Type: classical ballet

Aschenbrödel (Cinderella) is a ballet written by Johann Strauss II. He had written all the principal parts of the ballet, and was intending to fill in the orchestration as time permitted. However, he died in 1899, and it was finished by composer Josef Bayer in 1900.

== History ==
The idea for Strauss to write a ballet came from Rudolf Lothar, editor of the magazine Die Waage (The Weighing Scales). This occurred after the music and dance critic Eduard Hanslick, having been encouraged by Strauss' act 3 ballet score in his only opera, Ritter Pázmán, suggested that Strauss should write a full-score ballet. On 5 March 1898, a contest was organised in order to decide a proper scenario for Strauss's new ballet. The panel of judges consists of Hanslick; Gustav Mahler, the controversial conductor and composer who at the time also directed the Vienna Court Opera (including its ballet company); patron Nikolaus Dumba; Strauss himself, and Rudolf Lothar.

Finally, it was decided (after receiving over 700 entries) that the winner was a certain A. Kollmann from Salzburg. The prize money was even effected through a lawyer representative and there were even rumors circulated that Kollmann was a pseudonym and that he may even be a member of the royalty in Emperor Franz Josef's court.

Strauss was not particularly impressed with the scenario set in a modern department store, although he set to work almost immediately. He worked at his pace and refused to be rushed, and by the winter of 1898, he had completed act 1 and was able to perform small parts of the orchestral version on the piano. By the time Strauss died in Vienna on 3 June 1899, the work lay unfinished, although sketches of the entire work were already done.

Josef Bayer completed the work in 1900 and presented the score to Gustav Mahler for future production at the Vienna Court Opera. Mahler refused to appraise the score, doubting the originality of the work, as Bayer himself was also a ballet composer, and when shown the original score in Strauss' writing, he claimed that he could not care for the music. Many persistent rumors suggested that he was not interested in ballet at all and only concentrated on full-scale opera works. This has been disputed by the fact that Mahler himself was eager to obtain the rights to stage Tchaikovsky's The Sleeping Beauty ballet and that due to the lack of budget, he was not able to stage Aschenbrödel as envisioned in the scenario.

In 1901, Berlin's Royal Opera took interest in the score, with its directors captivated by the music, although they disapproved of the scenario. Their choreographer, Emil Graeb, suggested a change to the scenario and the task fell to Austrian writer Henrich Regel. The work's premiere on 2 May 1901 was a success, although reservations were made by Strauss' biographer, Ignaz Schnitzer, who commented that Bayer's orchestration fell short of Vienna's light-heartedness and the now-revised scenario was too "puritanical".

Mahler left the Vienna Court Opera at the end of the 1907 season. The new director, Felix Weingartner, who was impressed with the score, eagerly sought it out and conducted the orchestra himself at the premiere in Vienna on 4 October 1908. The ballet was regularly performed for seven years, achieving forty-six performances until the outbreak of World War I. Ironically, Mahler proved to be more accurate in his judgment as to the cost of the production, as the Viennese performances were expensive, and it was neglected until 1975 when the ballet was resurrected.

== Summary of plot ==
The action takes place in a department store, The Four Seasons. The leading characters are Gustav, owner of the store, and Franz, his younger brother and rival for the love of Grete (Cinderella), who works in the women's fashions department. Grete's stepmother, Mme. Leontine, is the department's supervisor. She has, of course, two daughters who lord it over Grete and do not seem to work though they are often in the store. Another key character, Piccolo, Gustav's valet, is a travesty role. As mentioned, the ballerina (the part is referred to as "Floral") appears only in the ballroom (act 2) for the floral divertissement.

Typically, the printed program for Cinderella lists all the dances. From this inventory one gets an inkling how Viennese ballets at the time differed from those of Saint Petersburg, which we know at least a little. There are four dances in act 1. The first, called "Franz's Self-portrait", introduces the ballet's junior male lead (probably demicaractère) to the female cast of characters and to the audience. In this solo, Franz (Ferdinand Rathner) proclaims who he is and what he does. One of the things he masters is driving an automobile—dancemiming this topic seems very Léonide Massine. The stepsisters (danced by real sisters, Lydia and Olga Berger) have a Promenade Adventure and Piccolo (Luise Wopalenski) does a "Love Letter Delivery" to Grete (Marie Kohler) who, with her trained birds, dances the "Waltz of the Doves".

Apparently there are no ensemble dances in act 1, though there are several in act 2, at the party thrown by Gustav. First comes the "Marveilleusen Quadrille" for Franz and the female corps. A pas de trois, "Masked Game", is for the stepsisters and Gustav (Karl Godlewski, one of Joseph Haßreiter's deputy choreographers). Grete dances a solo named the "Blue Domino" after the costume she wears (probably as covering as she arrives at the party). The "Confections Waltz" (which may have something to do with the refreshments being served) features nine female soloists and the female corps; this is followed by a "Salon Quadrille" for four couples, a mazurka for the stepsisters, and Grete's big solo, the "Cinderella Waltz". The ballerina (Cäcilie Cerri, Vienna's last Italian prima, was "Flora") enters in a "Welcome with Flowers", which leads into the biggest dance number, the "Flowertorch Polonaise" with "Flora," Grete, thirteen female soloists, Gustav, four male soloists, the adult female corps and the group of female students.

An "Amoretten Polka" is the first dance in act 3, followed by the "Bridal-Treasure Waltz" for Grete, a female soloist, Piccolo, Gustav, and the female students. The next dance, "Old Vienna Porcelain", for Piccolo plus four solo women and four solo men, may represent a wedding present, and the final "Jewels Waltz" for Piccolo, nine female soloists and the female corps, is perhaps, the setting for the bridegroom's gift to his bride.
