= Thunder in the City =

1937 film

- 1937 Theatrical Poster
- Directed by: Marion Gering
- Written by: Robert E. Sherwood (screenplay); Aben Kandel (screenplay); Ákos Tolnay (screenplay); Jack E. Jewell (scenario); Dudley Storrick (additional dialogue)
- Produced by: Alexander Esway (producer); Richard Vernon (assistant producer)
- Starring: Edward G. Robinson; Luli Deste; Nigel Bruce; Ralph Richardson
- Cinematography: Alfred Gilks
- Edited by: Arthur Hilton
- Music by: Miklós Rózsa
- Production company: Atlantic Film Company
- Distributed by: United Artists (UK); Columbia Pictures (US)
- Release dates: 13 January 1937 (UK); 22 April 1937 (US)
- Running time: 87 minutes (US); 88 minutes (UK)
- Country: United Kingdom
- Language: English
- Box office: $300,000

Thunder in the City is a 1937 British drama film directed by Marion Gering and starring Edward G. Robinson, Luli Deste, Nigel Bruce and Ralph Richardson. It was written by Robert E. Sherwood, Aben Kandel, Ákos Tolnay, Jack E. Jewell and Dudley Storrick.

== Plot ==
An American salesman travels to England, ostensibly to learn a more formal approach to salesmanship. A financially struggling family of noble ancestry mistakes him for a millionaire and attempts to sell him their stately home. Unable to purchase the property, he instead works with the family using his established sales methods, leading to a romantic relationship and success in business.

== Cast ==
- Edward G. Robinson as Daniel "Dan" Armstrong
- Luli Deste as Lady Patricia "Pat" Graham
- Nigel Bruce as Duke of Glenavon
- Constance Collier as Duchess of Glenavon
- Ralph Richardson as Henry V. Manningdale
- Arthur Wontner as Sir Peter "Pete" Challoner
- Nancy Burne as Edna, the singer
- Annie Esmond as Lady Challoner
- Cyril Raymond as James
- Elizabeth Inglis as Dolly
- James Carew as Mr. Snyderling
- Everley Gregg as Millie, Dan's secretary in New York
- Donald Calthrop as Dr. Plumet, the chemist
- Billy Bray as Bill, the pianist

== Soundtrack ==
Main dramatic Score by Miklós Rózsa.

- "Pomp and Circumstance March No.1 in D" (Music by Edward Elgar, words ("Land of Hope and Glory") by Arthur C. Benson)
- Billy Bray and Nancy Burne – "She Was Poor But She Was Honest"
- "For He's a Jolly Good Fellow" (Traditional)
- Billy Bray and Nancy Burne – "Magnelite"
- Stockholders – "Magnelite"
- Stockholders – "Auld Lang Syne" (Scottish traditional music, lyrics by Robert Burns)

== Reception ==
The Monthly Film Bulletin wrote: "The film has some very amusing passages, particularly those satirising certain aspects of aristocratic English life; but its main implications (the apparent exaltation of a peculiarly blatant form of advertisement) are crude, and will not be to everybody's taste."

Kine Weekly wrote: "Here we have a really bright, romantic comedy drama in which slick humour and retreshing romance emerge from a clash of American and British big business methods There is a rich vein of satire in the clever, neatly balanced story, and this is joyously expressed through the keenness of the direction and the vital and resourceful acting of Edward G. Robinson."

Variety wrote: "It's a highly fantastic success story around an American gogetter; it's got Edward G. Robinson doing comedy, and clumsily making love; it's not distinguished by production superiority and it's unlikely to do better than fair; but Thunder in the City in many ways makes itself quite likable."

Writing for The Spectator in 1937, Graham Greene called it "worst English film of the quarter", and criticised the special effects and its "complete ignorance – in spite of its national studio – of English life and behaviour". Conceding that the film is, after all, a fantasy, Greene nonetheless complained that "even a fantasy needs some relation to life".
