= White Shadows (film) =

- Film poster
- Directed by: Helmut Käutner
- Written by: Helmut Käutner; Maria von der Osten-Sacken
- Produced by: Fedor Janas; Hans Tost
- Starring: Hilde Krahl; Hans Söhnker; Claude Farell
- Cinematography: Helmut Ashley
- Edited by: Irene Tomschik
- Music by: Bernhard Eichhorn
- Production company: Dornas-Film
- Distributed by: Allianz Filmverleih
- Release date: 28 September 1951
- Running time: 83 minutes
- Country: West Germany
- Language: German

White Shadows (German: Weiße Schatten) is a 1951 West German drama film directed by Helmut Käutner and starring Hilde Krahl, Hans Söhnker and Claude Farell.

The film's sets were designed by Fritz Moegle. Much of the film was shot on location in Tyrol.

== Cast ==
- Hilde Krahl as Ruth
- Hans Söhnker as Richard
- Claude Farell as Hella
- Hugo Gottschlich as Toni
- Hermann Erhardt as Älterer Grenzer
- Franz Muxeneder as Junger Grenzer
- Otto Bolesch as Der Fremde

== Bibliography ==
- Hans-Michael Bock and Tim Bergfelder. The Concise Cinegraph: An Encyclopedia of German Cinema. Berghahn Books, 2009.
