= Lili Marberg =

German and Austrian actress

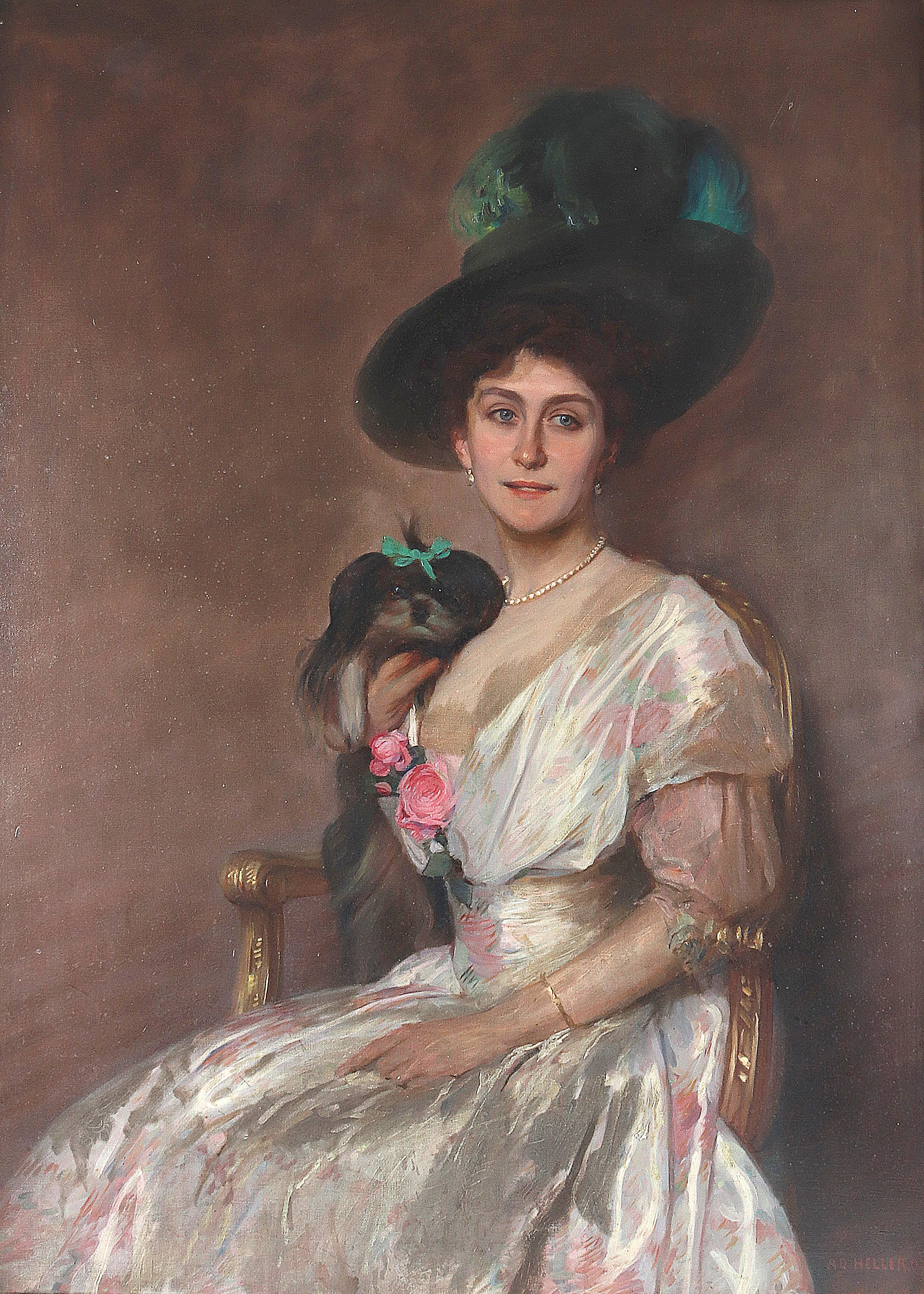
- Lili Marberg, 1907 portrait by Adolf Heller
- Born: 9 December 1876; Grimma, Kingdom of Saxony, German Empire
- Died: 8 April 1962 (aged 85); Vienna, Austria
- Occupation: Actress
- Organizations: Münchner Schauspielhaus; Volkstheater, Vienna; Burgtheater
- Title: Kammerschauspielerin

Lili Marberg (9 December 1876 – 8 April 1962) was a German and Austrian actress. In 1907, she came to the Volkstheater, Vienna. She was a member of the Vienna Burgtheater from 1911 to 1950 where she played leading roles in the world premieres of plays by Schnitzler and Wedekind, among others.

== Life ==
Marberg was born in Grimma, the daughter of a teacher. She attended the Dresden Conservatory for a short while, but then moved to Zwickau where she began to act as a Dilettantin at the Goethe-Verein. She was a member of the Theater in Elberfeld-Barmen from 1898 to 1900. After one season at the Thalia-Theater in Hamburg, she moved on to the Münchner Schauspielhaus.

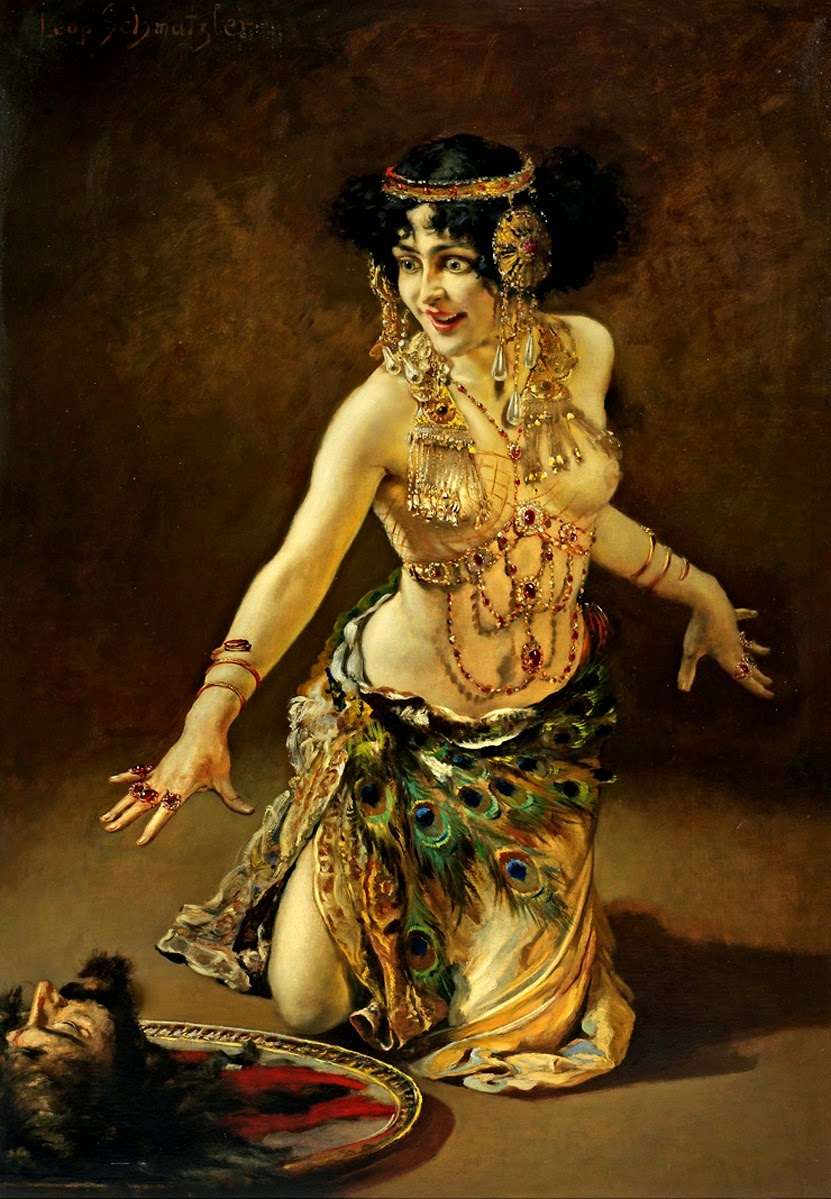
Tanz der Salomé, painting by Leopold Schmutzler, c. 1905, The Jack Daulton Collection, Los Altos Hills, California

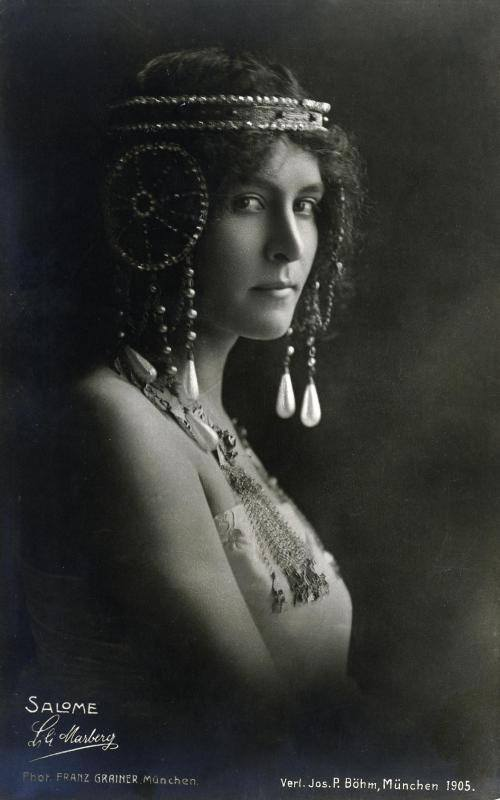
Lili Marberg (as Salome), photographed by Franz Grainer, 1905

Marberg caused a sensation in the title role of Oscar Wilde's Salome in 1903, which remained in the repertoire for five years. She was depicted in the role by Leopold Schmutzler, performing the dance of seven veils; she was possibly also the model for a painting of Salome by Franz von Stuck.

In 1907, Marberg was called to the Volkstheater in Vienna to succeed Helene Odilon. In 1911, she became a member of the Burgtheater and remained there until 1950. On 14 October 1911, she played the female lead in the world premiere of Schnitzler's Das weite Land. When Shaw's Pygmalion received its world premiere in German on 16 October 1913, she played a lead role alongside Max Paulsen. She also appeared in new plays by Frank Wedekind, Gerhart Hauptmann and Henrik Ibsen. When she became older she played character roles. In 1937, she appeared in the world premiere of Kaiser Joseph II. by Rudolf Henz. She was awarded the title Kammerschauspielerin, became an honorary member of the Burgtheater, and was appointed professor.

Marberg was the second wife of the interior architect Karl Hans Jaray (1872–1944). The actor Hans Jaray, her stepson, had to flee Austria after the annexation of Austria by the Nazis.

Marberg died in Vienna at age 85. She was buried at the Grinzing cemetery.
