= The Case of the Black Parrot =

1941 film by Noel M. Smith

- Theatrical release poster
- Directed by: Noel M. Smith; Frank Fox (dialogue director)
- Screenplay by: Robert E. Kent
- Based on: In the Next Room 1923 play by Eleanor Robeson Belmont Harriet Ford; The Mystery of the Boule Cabinet 1912 novel by Burton E. Stevenson
- Produced by: William Jacobs
- Starring: William Lundigan; Maris Wrixon; Eddie Foy, Jr. Luli Deste; Paul Cavanagh
- Cinematography: Ted D. McCord
- Edited by: Thomas Pratt
- Music by: Bernhard Kaun
- Production company: Warner Bros. Pictures
- Distributed by: Warner Bros. Pictures
- Release date: January 11, 1941 (US)
- Running time: 60 minutes
- Country: United States
- Language: English

The Case of the Black Parrot is a 1941 American mystery crime film directed by Noel M. Smith and written by Robert E. Kent. The film stars William Lundigan, Maris Wrixon, Eddie Foy, Jr., Luli Deste, Paul Cavanagh and Charles Waldron. The film was released by Warner Bros. Pictures on January 11, 1941. Despite the identical title structure, it is not part of the studio's Perry Mason series, which had ended in 1937.

== Plot ==
Aboard a ship, newspaper reporter Jim Moore falls for passenger Sandy Vantine and meets her uncle Paul, who is in possession of a small wooden chest that he believes could be a copy made by the mysterious Black Parrot, a notorious art forger. Scotland Yard inspector Colonel Piggott is also aboard, presumably on the Parrot's tail.

Jim proposes to Sandy and meets her relatives and family acquaintances. They include Madame de Charierre, the chest's rightful owner, whose maid Julia had been trying to retrieve it because a secret drawer contained compromising love letters. A police constable named Grady arrives and Jim contacts Piggott as well. Paul and another guest quickly end up dead and Piggott quickly declares everyone in the house to be a suspect.

A second hidden compartment contains priceless diamonds. Jim and Sandy realize just in time that Piggott is the Black Parrot who has been pursuing the jewels all along.

== Cast ==
- William Lundigan as Jim Moore
- Maris Wrixon as Sandy Vantine
- Eddie Foy, Jr. as Tripod Daniels
- Luli Deste as Madame de Charriere
- Paul Cavanagh as Max Armand
- Charles Waldron as Paul Vantine
- Joseph Crehan as Inspector Grady
- Emory Parnell as Simmonds
- Phyllis Barry as Julia
- Cyril Thornton as George Rogers
- Leyland Hodgson as Parks
- Ernie Stanton as Colonel Piggott
- Cliff Saum as Morel
- Louis Natheaux as Theophile Daurelle (uncredited)

== Reception ==
In a contemporary review for The New York Times, critic Theodore Strauss wrote: "It is complete with standard equipment—a priceless old cabinet with secret drawers, a beribboned packet of scented letters, veiled women bearing a double identity, muffled figures silhouetted at the library window as the clock chimes midnight, and a butler with a guilt complex (probably because all the scenarists are pointing the finger of suspicion at him, but that doesn't fool us any more). But somehow each moment of suspense is merely a prelude to long-winded deductions in the library. In short, 'The Case of the Black Parrott' [sic] is on the verbose side, though there's no such bird in it."
