= Willy Fränzl =

Austrian dancer

Willy Fränzl (5 June 1898 – 24 Juni 1982) was an Austrian dancer.

== Life ==
Born in Vienna, Fränzl came from a family of dancers. Already his father Friedrich Fränzl (1863–1938) war bis 1915 Solo dancer at the k.k. Hofoper. After his retirement he had his own ballet and dance school in Margareten. and made a name for himself as a dance arranger of Viennese grand balls; he was also chairman of the "Verbandes österreichischer Tanzmeister".

His son Wilhelm ("Willy") began his dance training at the Court Opera in 1904. His career took off: in 1921 he was a principal dancer, from 1935 ballet master, until 1943 on the board. He also worked at the Salzburg Festivals (see Opera Cast of the Salzburg Festival 1938 to 1944) in 1938 and choreographed Tannhäuser under the conduct of Hans Knappertsbusch.

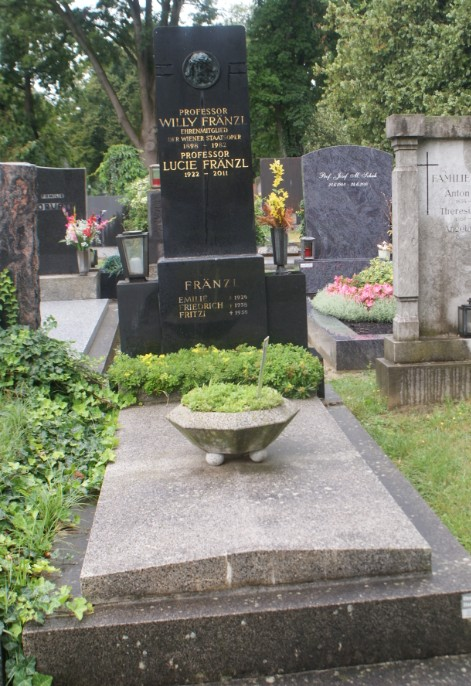
gravesite of Willy Fränzl

Many later stars were apprenticed to him, including Michael Birkmeyer and Susanne Kirnbauer-Bundy.

In his private life he also found his great love in ballet. In 1946, he married his student and later solo dancer Lucie Bräuer (1922-2011). Their daughter was born in 1950.

After 58 years with the Vienna State Opera, Ballet master Fränzl retired at the end of the 1962 season.

Fränzl directed the opening of the Vienna Opera Ball for many years and also many other ball events.

After his death in 1982 at the age of 84, his wife Lucie continued to run the dance school (Landstraße), her last position being choreographer of the Opera Ball at the State Opera in 1995. In 2011, she was laid to rest in a grave of honour (Group 46E, series 4, number 12) for her husband at the Vienna Central Cemetery.

The since 1925 or 1927 in Wieden, Mozartgasse 6, Mödling, Hauptstraße 42a, under the name of Fränzl go back to Willy Fränzl's elder brother Rudolf Fränzl ("Rudi", 1894–1974), from 1911 to 1945 dancer/solo dancer at the Imperial and Royal Court Opera/State Opera. Court Opera/State Opera.
