= South to Karanga =

- Directed by: Harold D. Schuster
- Written by: Edmund L. Hartmann; Stanley Rubin
- Produced by: Marshall Grant
- Starring: James Craig; Luli Deste; Charles Bickford
- Cinematography: Jerome Ash
- Edited by: W. Donn Hayes
- Music by: Hans J. Salter
- Production company: Universal Pictures
- Distributed by: Universal Pictures
- Release date: August 2, 1940
- Running time: 59 minutes
- Country: United States
- Language: English

South to Karanga is a 1940 American action adventure film directed by Harold D. Schuster starring James Craig, Luli Deste and Charles Bickford.

== Cast ==
- Charles Bickford as Jeff Worthing
- James Craig as Steve Hawley
- Luli Deste as Julia Garrett
- John Sutton as David Wallace
- Maurice Moscovitch as Paul Stacco
- Paul Hurst as Slats
- Abner Biberman as Manek Sen
- Ben Carter as Higgins
- Frank Reicher as Doctor Greenleaf
- Addison Richards as Edmund Daniels
- Joseph Crehan as Ridgley

== Production ==
The film was originally called Bombay Uprising but was relocated from India to Africa out of fear of offending British audiences. It was known as South to Katanga before being changed to South to Karanga. Dick Foran was to play to lead but fell ill and was replaced by James Craig.
