= Alexander Girardi =

Austrian actor and singer (1850–1918)

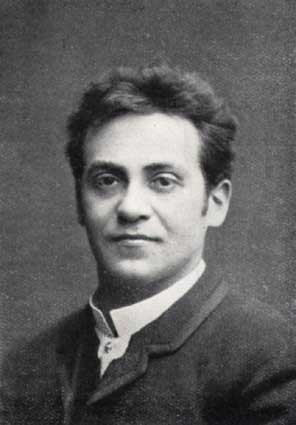
- Born: 5 December 1850; Graz, Austria
- Died: 20 February 1918 (aged 67); Vienna, Austria
- Occupations: actor and tenor singer
- Known for: operettas
- Notable work: Valentin in Ferdinand Raimund's Der Verschwender, Fortunatus Wurzel in Ferdinand Raimunds's Das Mädchen aus der Feenwelt oder Der Bauer als Millionär
- Spouse: Helene Odilon (div 1896)
- Father: Andreas Girardi

Alexander Girardi (pronounced [dʒiˈrardi]) (5 December 1850 – 20 April 1918) was an Austrian actor and tenor singer in operettas.

== Career ==
Alexander Girardi was born in Graz on 5 December 1850. His father was the locksmith Andreas Girardi who had migrated to Graz from Cortina d'Ampezzo. Following the early death of his father, Alexander Girardi was raised by his stepfather who put him into a locksmith apprenticeship. Against his stepfather's wishes, he joined the amateur theatre Die Tonhalle, where his acting talent was discovered; this led to an engagement at the Vienna Strampfer-Theater.

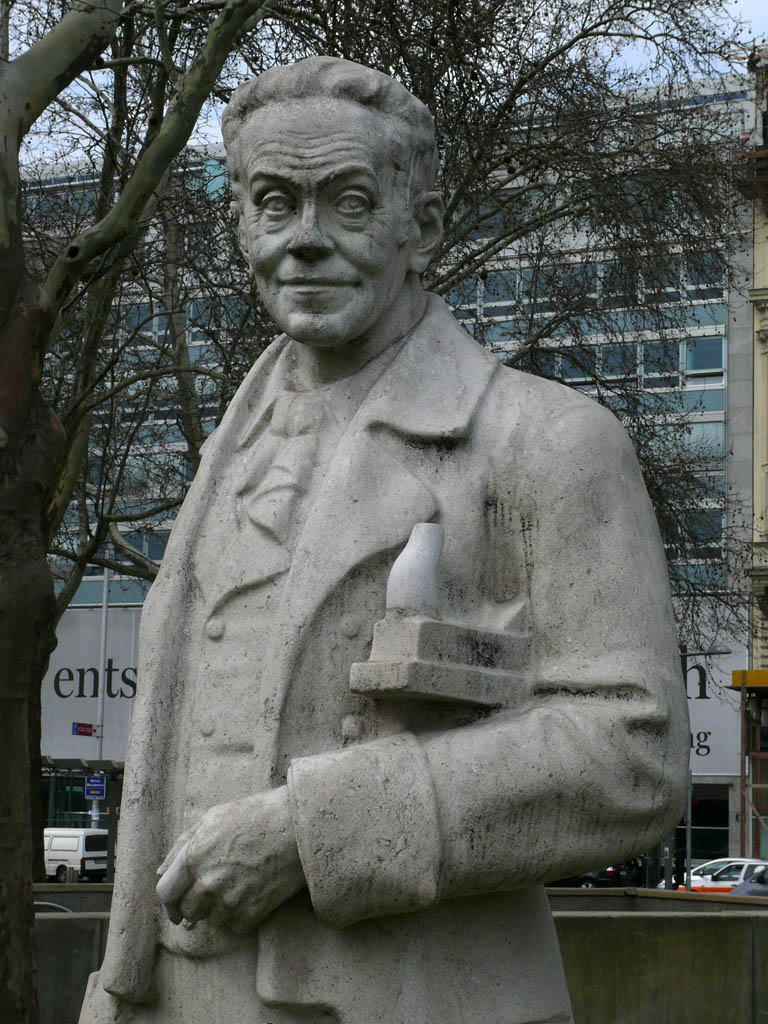
Girardi monument, Karlsplatz in Wien; as "Valentin" in Ferdinand Raimund's Der Verschwender

From 1874 to 1896 and again from 1902 to 1905, Girardi was a tenor and comedic actor in Vienna at the Theater an der Wien where he created leading roles in more than 50 operettas and musical plays; many of them by composer Johann Strauss II. In 1896/97 he worked at the Carltheater and then two years at the Volkstheater in Vienna. He also had guest appearances at other important theatres in Vienna and toured Germany (Berlin, Hamburg, Dresden).

One of his most renowned roles was Valentin in Ferdinand Raimund's Der Verschwender, particularly his rendition of the "Hobellied", the most famous number of the stage music by Conradin Kreutzer.

At the beginning of World War I Girardi retired from the stage and returned to Graz. Two months before his death in 1918, he was called to the Burgtheater in Vienna to play the role of Fortunatus Wurzel in Ferdinand Raimunds's Der Bauer als Millionär.

Girardi was unhappily married to Helene Odilon. Odilon had many affairs and had Girardi committed to a mental asylum (based on a certificate by Julius Wagner-Jauregg, who had not seen Girardi). However, Girardi escaped and received help so that he would not be locked up. Odilon and Girardi divorced in 1896. The actress Katharina Schratt persuaded Emperor Franz Joseph to release Girardi.

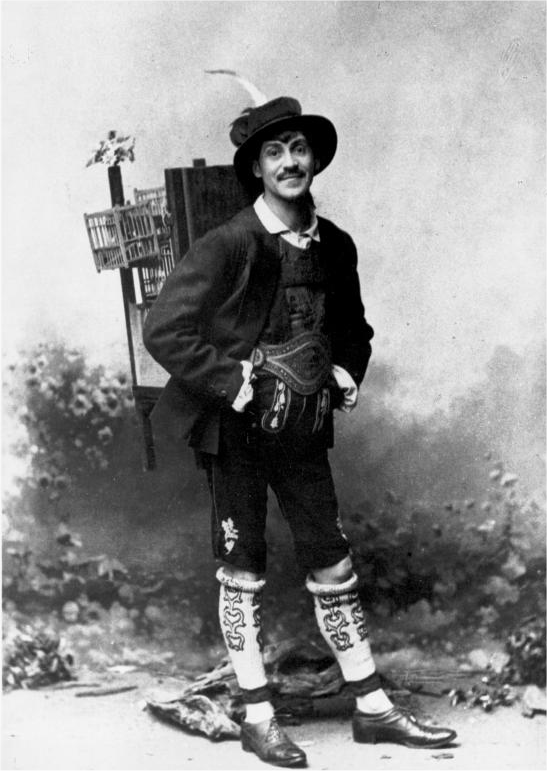
Girardi as Adam in Carl Zeller's Der Vogelhändler

Aged 67, Girardi died on 20 April 1918 in Vienna. He is buried at the Vienna Zentralfriedhof, grave 33E-9-16.

Girardi's staple stage role was the comic. He worked in the tradition of Ferdinand Raimund and Johann Nestroy, and he made a significant contribution to the popular Vienna operetta. Girardi created the roles of Blasoni in Johann Strauss's Cagliostro in Wien (1875), Andredl in Carl Millöcker's Das verwunschene Schloss (1878), Jan Janicki in Millöcker's Der Bettelstudent (1882), Benozzo in Millöcker's Gasparone (1884), Kálmán Zsupán in Strauss's The Gypsy Baron (1885), Adam in Carl Zeller's Der Vogelhändler (1891), the title role in Edmund Eysler's Bruder Straubinger (1903), and Pali Rácz in Emmerich Kálmán’s Der Zigeunerprimas (1912). He contributed greatly to the Golden Age of Vienna operetta.

== Honours ==
Giradi's life was the subject of the 1954 film Der Komödiant von Wien.

The dish Girardirostbraten (Girardi roast beef) is named after him – a beef dish heavily covered with bacon and button mushrooms. His favourite hat style, a straw hat with flat crown and brim (a boater), became popular as the Giradi Hat. The city of Graz and the Vienna Mariahilf district have a Giradigasse (Girardi Lane) and there is a Girardipark in the district Innere Stadt. The Alexander Girardi International Singing Competition in Coburg is named after him.
