= Leopold Schmutzler =

German painter (1864–1940)

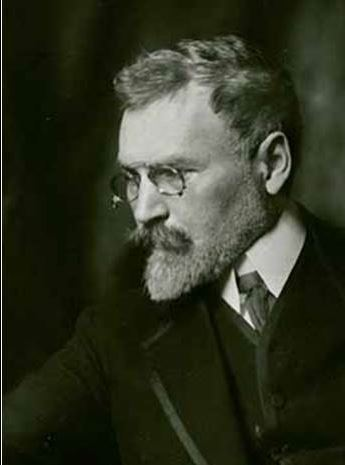
Leopold Schmutzler. Photograph by Theodor Hilsdorf (c.1910, detail)

Leopold Schmutzler (29 March 1864 – 20 June 1940) was a Bohemian-born German painter. He specialized in portraits, semi-erotic female figures, and Rococo-style genre scenes. In his later years he supported the Nazi Party.

== Biography ==
He was born in Mies. His father was a saddler and innkeeper, who also gave him his first drawing lessons. Originally, he planned to attend the "Naval School of Music" in Pula, but was turned down for poor eyesight. From 1880 to 1882, he studied at the Academy of Fine Arts, Vienna with Christian Griepenkerl (the person who later rejected Hitler's application to the Academy). After that, he transferred to the Academy of Fine Arts Munich and studied with Otto Seitz. He settled there after his graduation in 1885. He also spent brief study periods in Rome and Paris.

By the turn of the century, he had become one of the busiest portrait painters in Munich. He received important commissions from the Bavarian Royal Family, but also portrayed dancers and other popular performers. In fact, one of his best-known portraits was of the actress Lili Marberg in the role of Salome.

His style was generally realistic with Art-Deco elements. He always paid great attention to his subject's clothing but, conversely, also painted many nudes. In the thirties, he became a supporter of the Nazis and created a series of works that reflected the Blut und Boden ideology. In 1940, not long before his death, Jungfrauen nach der Arbeit (Maidens after Work) won a major award at the Große Deutsche Kunstausstellung in the Haus der Kunst and was purchased by Hitler for 7,000 Reichsmarks.

His association with the Nazi regime virtually destroyed his career outside Germany, and his posthumous reputation, although his works may still be seen at several museums, including the Frye Art Museum in Seattle whose founder, Charles Frye (1858–1940), was a great admirer of Schmutzler's pre-Nazi work.

== Selected paintings ==
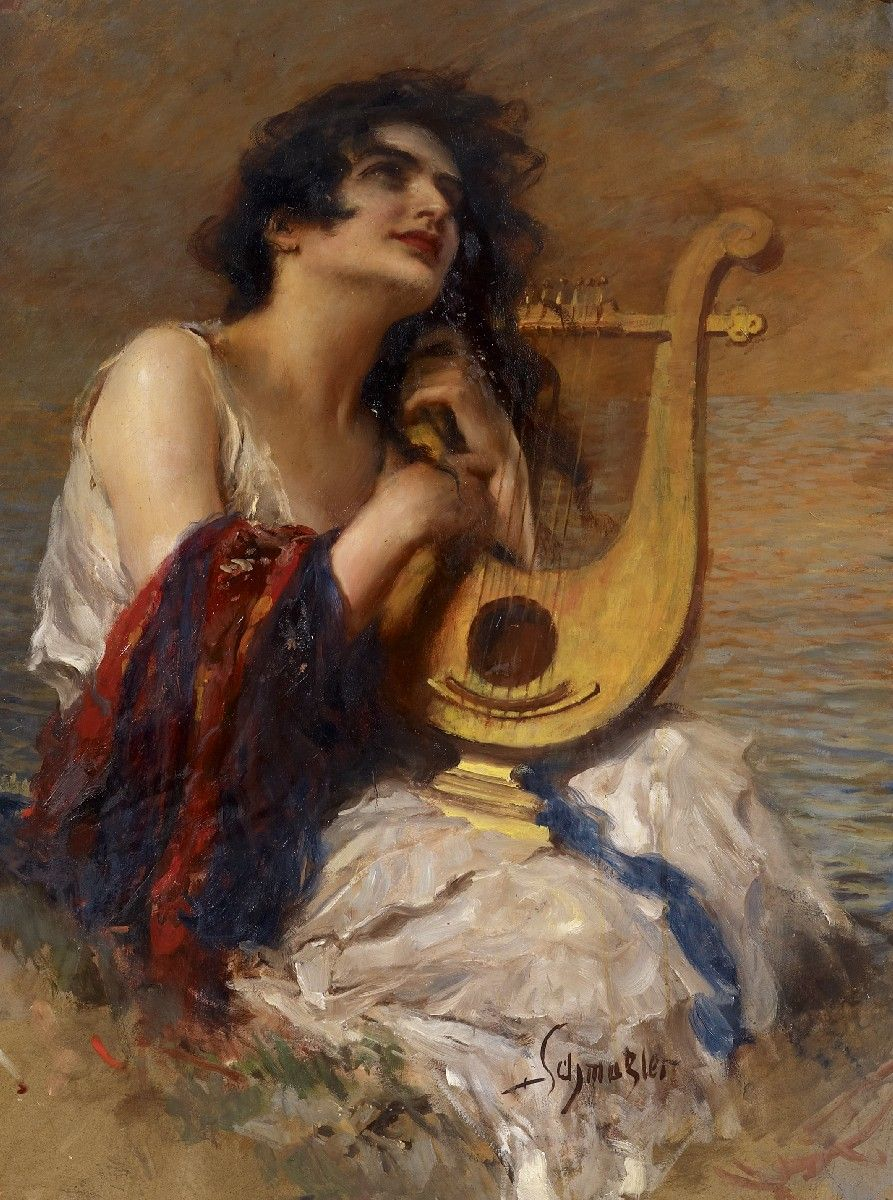
Young Woman with Lyre

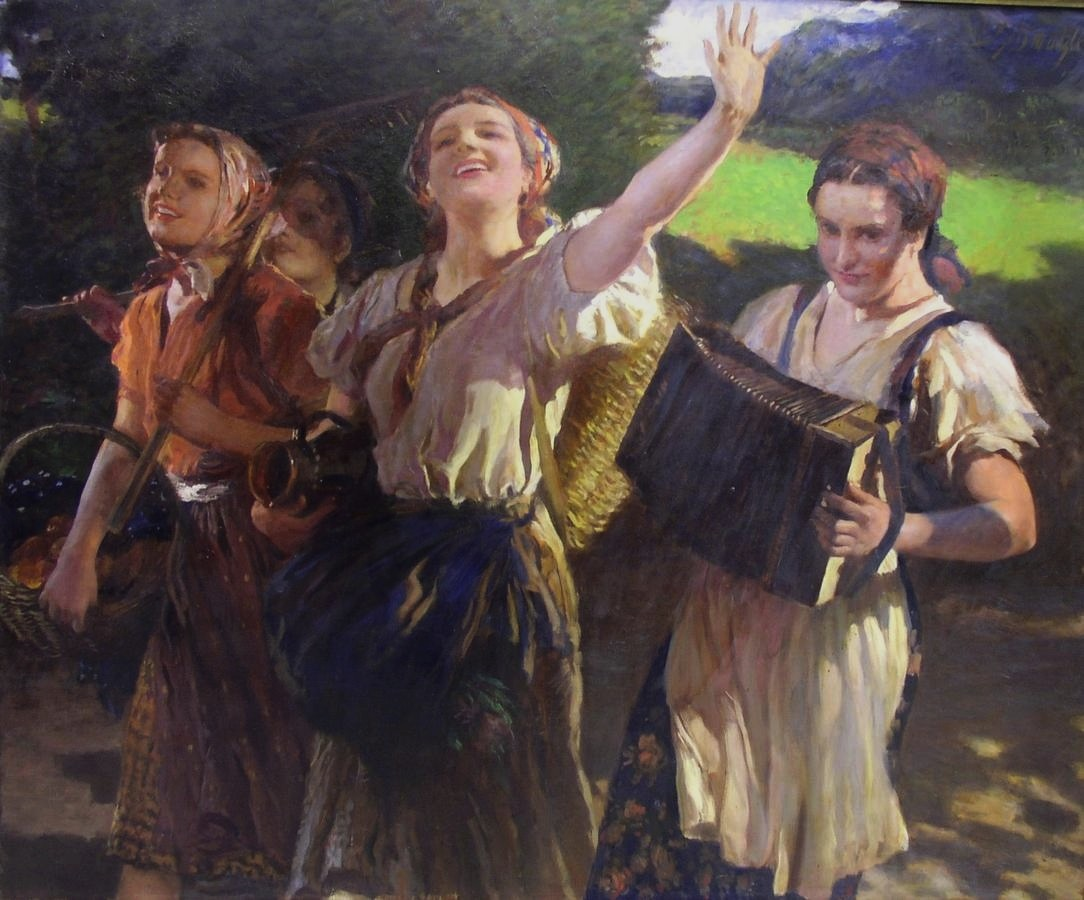
Farm Girls (or "Maidens") after Work

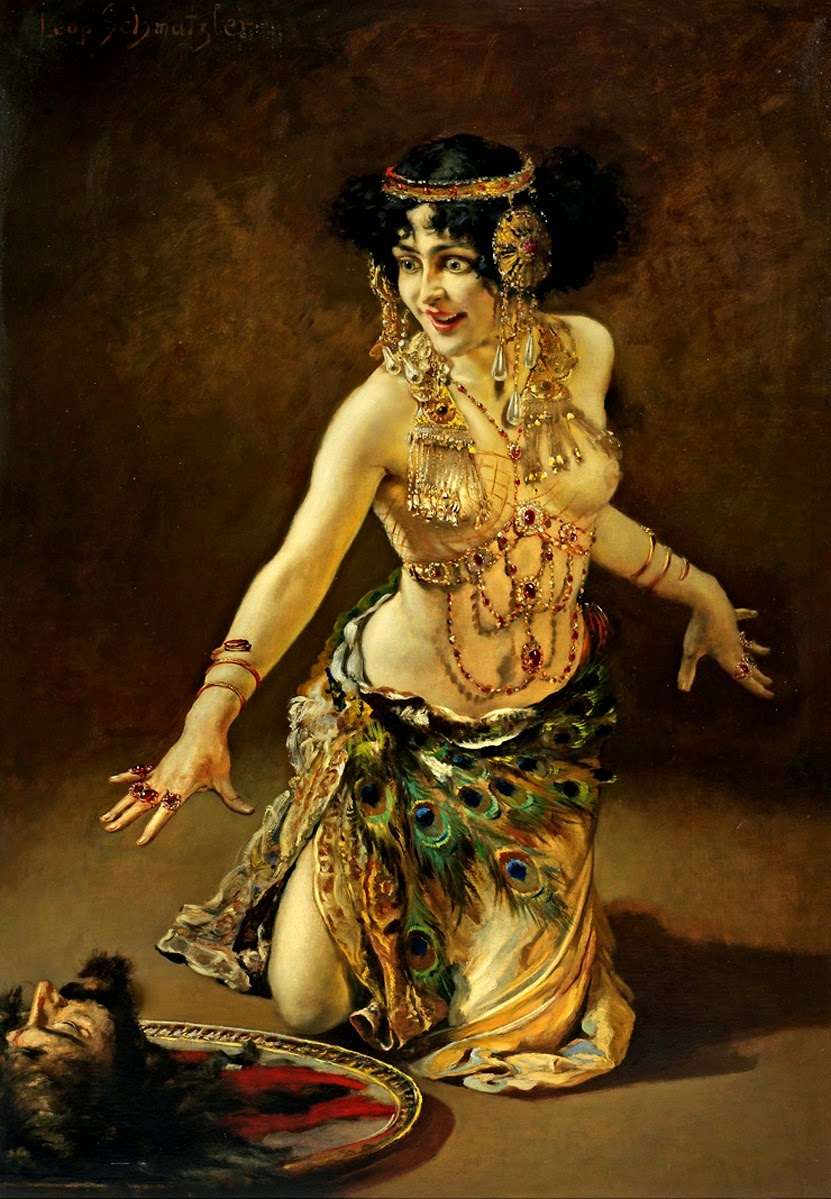
Lili Marberg as Salome (c.1905) The Jack Daulton Collection

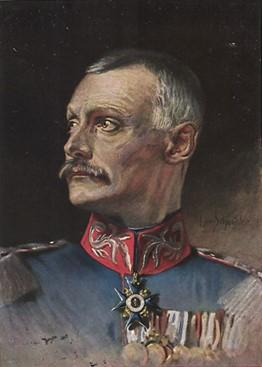
Portrait of Crown Prince Rupprecht von Bayern

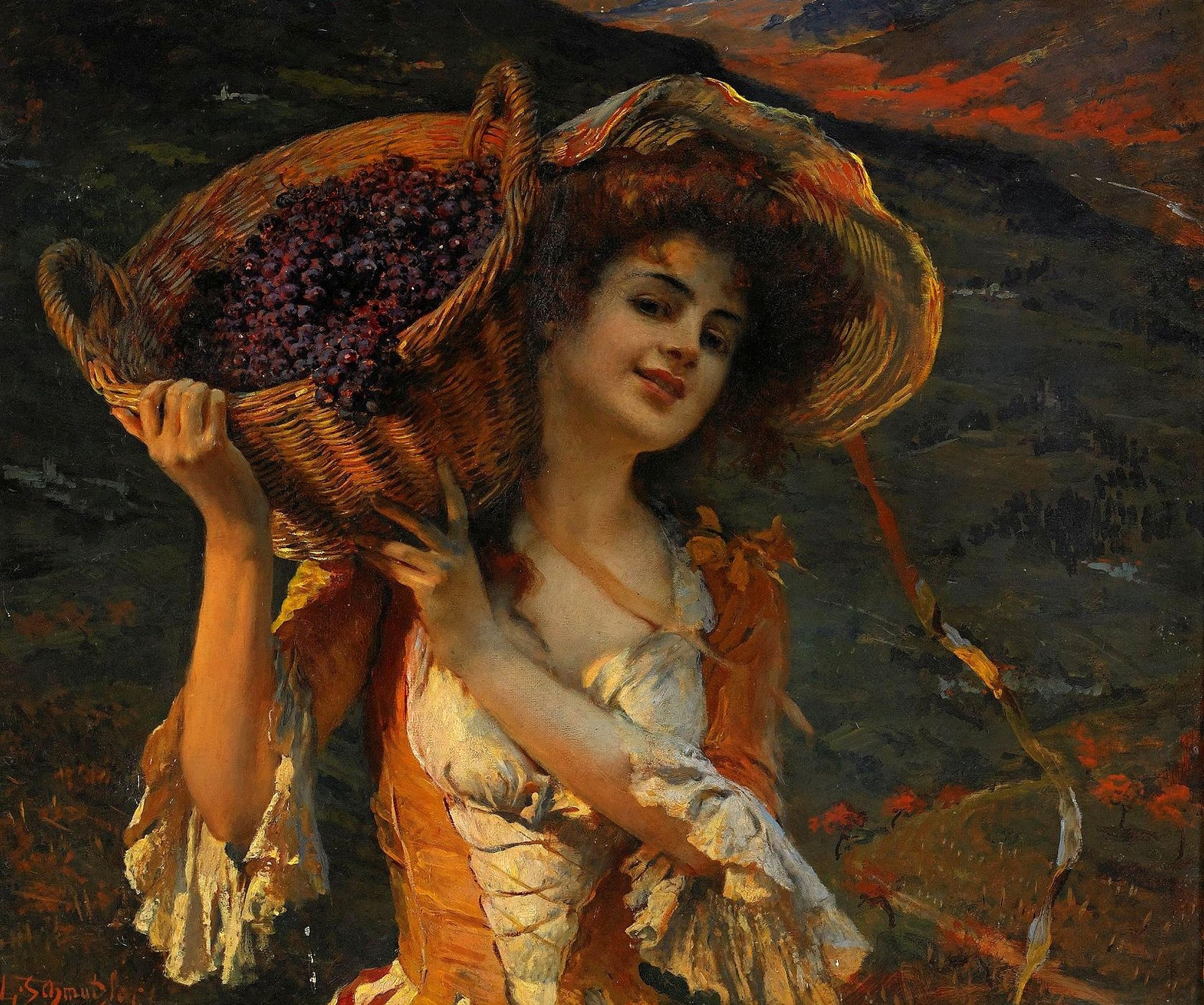
La vendangeuse

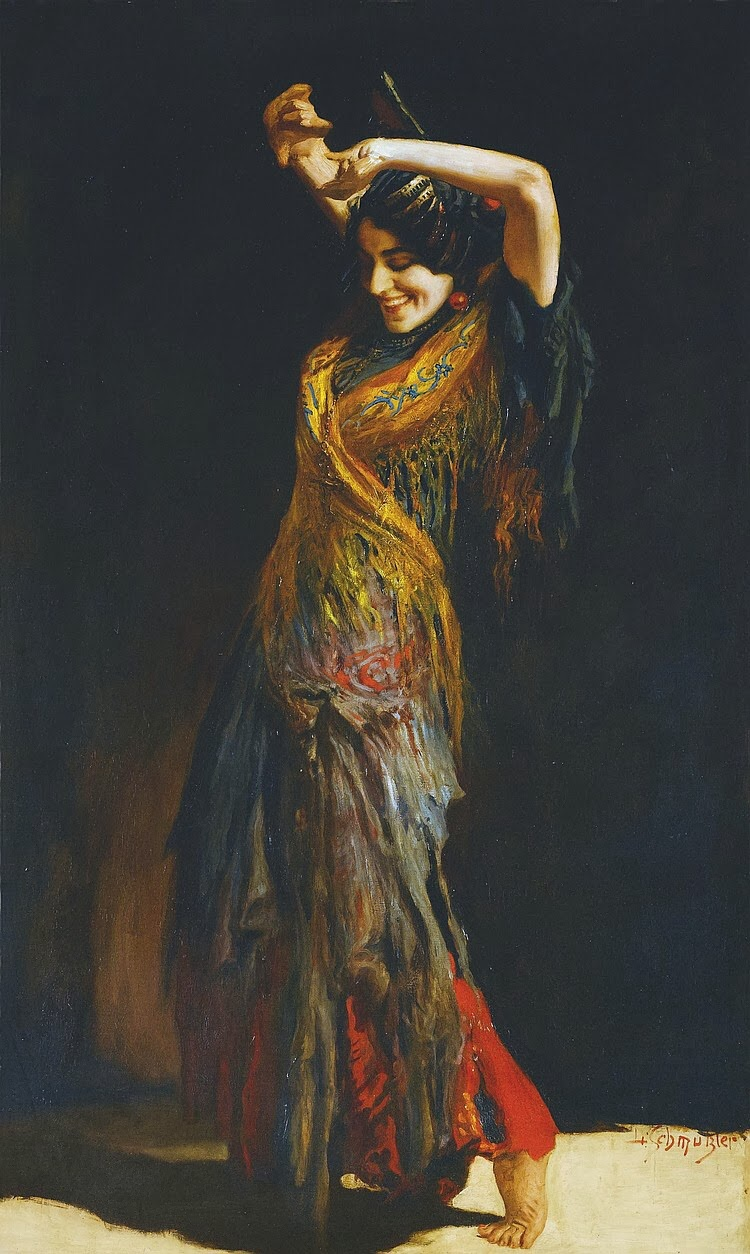
Salome, 1920

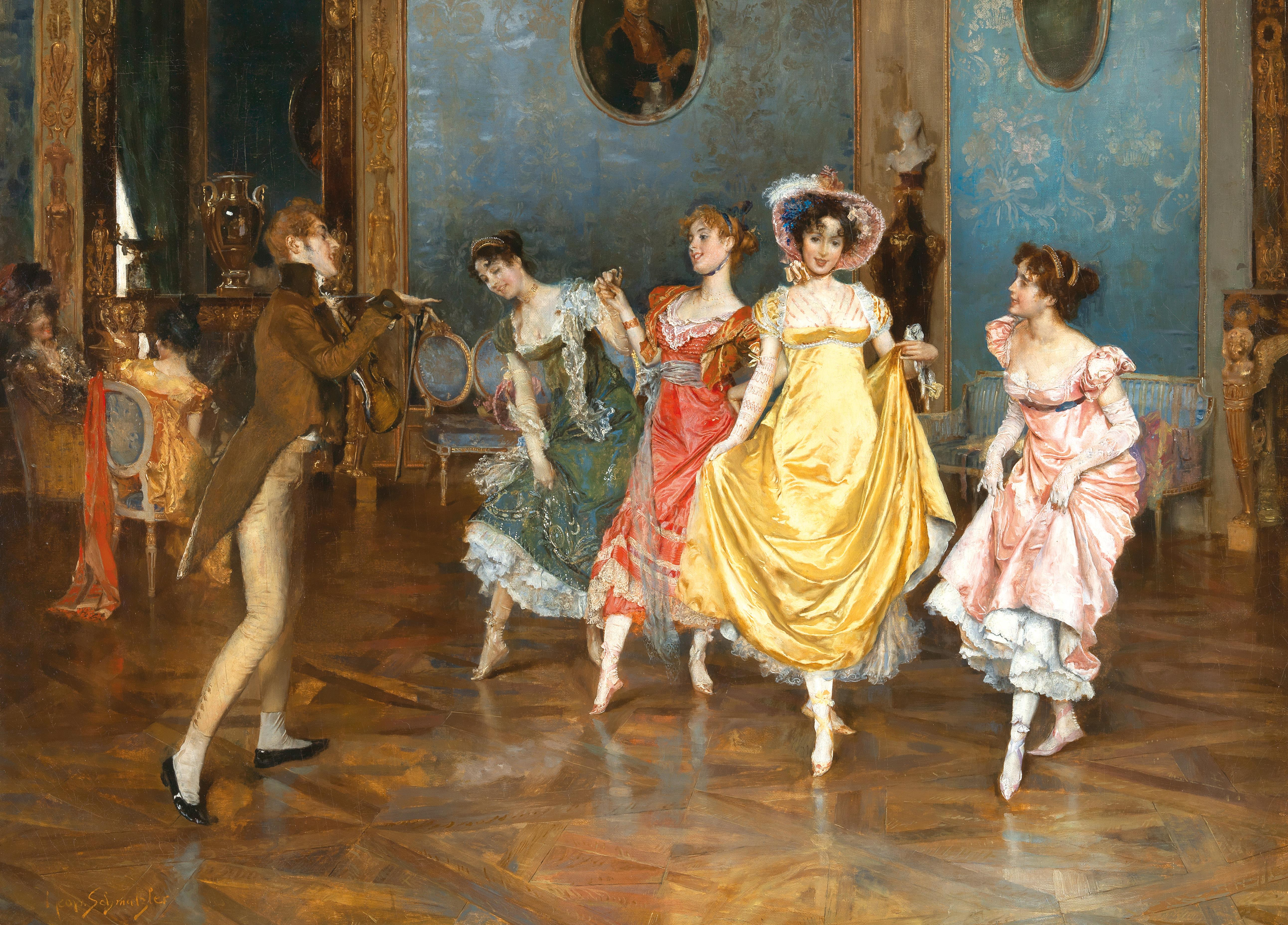
At the dance rehearsal

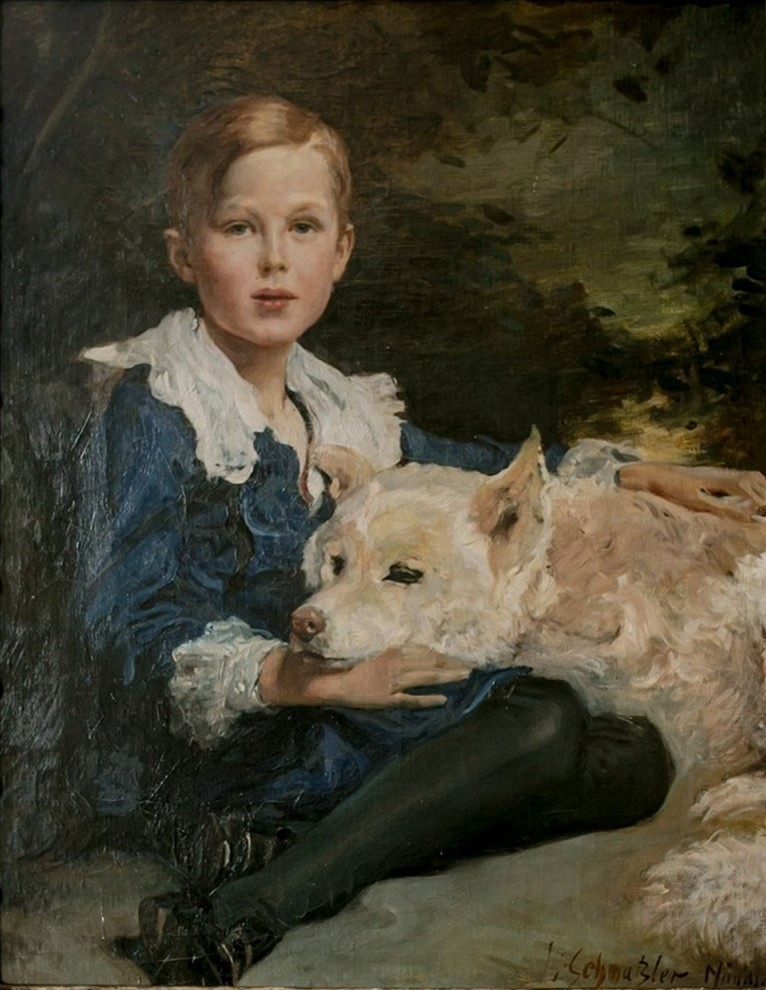
Hrabia Bolko Konrad Friedrich (1910-36), 1910

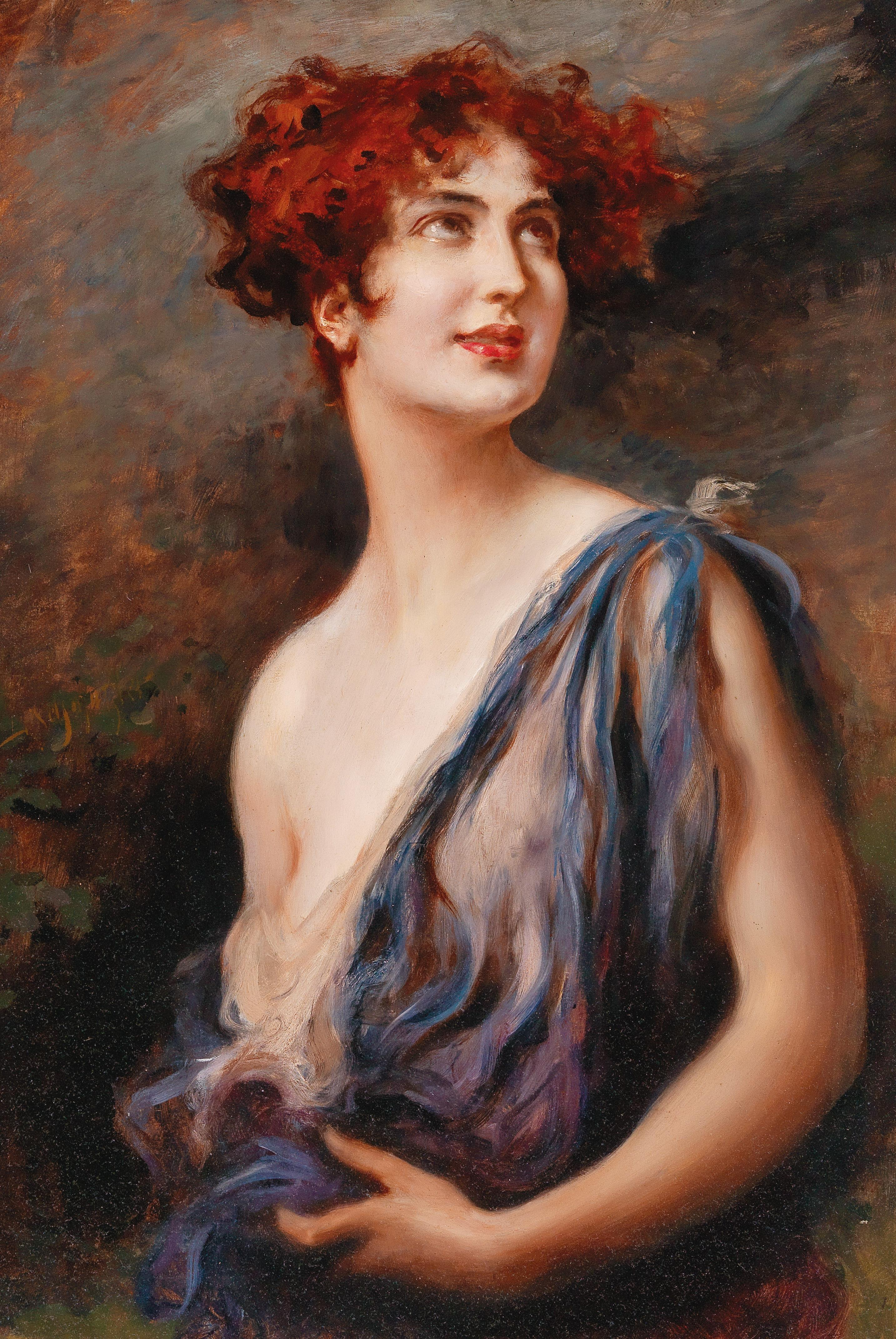
Young Beauty, by 1940
