= She Married an Artist =

1937 film by Marion Gering

- Directed by: Marion Gering
- Written by: Gladys Lehman; Delmer Daves; Avery Strakosch
- Produced by: Sidney Buchman
- Starring: John Boles; Luli Deste; Frances Drake
- Cinematography: Merritt B. Gerstad
- Edited by: Viola Lawrence
- Music by: Morris Stoloff
- Production company: Columbia Pictures
- Distributed by: Columbia Pictures
- Release date: November 27, 1937
- Running time: 77 minutes
- Country: United States
- Language: English

She Married an Artist is a 1937 American romantic comedy film directed by Marion Gering and starring John Boles, Luli Deste, and Frances Drake. It was produced and distributed by Columbia Pictures. The film's sets were designed by the art director Stephen Goosson.

== Plot Synopsis ==
The film She Married an Artist (1937) produced by Sidney Buchman, focuses on Lee Thornwood (John Boles), an affluent American artist. He has two women close to him in his life, as Sally Dennis (Frances Drake), his long-lived model, inspires him for his “Thornwood Girl” illustration. They seem to have a close attachment to each other and are made for one another. Still, instead of Sally, Lee marries a prestigious Parisian fashion designer named Toni Bonnet (Luli Deste), professionally known as Antoinette.

Toni Bonnet travels to New York wanting to reunite her romance with Lee. On the trip to New York, Toni wants to grab Lee's attention, so she gives an interview on board and publicly talks down on American fashions, notably putting an emphasis on “Thornwood Girl,” Lee's most recent illustration. After Toni and Lee go out to lunch, Lee calls Martha Moriarty (Helen Westley) his housekeeper and tells her that he and Toni plan to have a European honeymoon. Their marriage starts going through difficulties as the ship in port is not able to leave, so they return to his apartment.

Toni gets to meet Sally Dennis, Lee's longstanding model, at the apartment. The Publisher of “Thornwood Girl,” Whitney Holton (Albert Dekker), asks Sally to do an illustration based on Toni's clothing. Sally does not want to do that new job, and when Toni walks into the studio, she kisses Lee in hopes of winning him over. Toni does not like how much time Lee spends working with Sally and realizes what Sally is trying to do, while Lee starts to feel guilty.

The next day, when Toni is working on her designs for Phillip Corval (Alexander D’arcy), a dress manufacturer, Lee asks her to go see the play You Can't Take It With You. The two are locked into the fur vault by accident by the night watchmen after being offered a fur coat by Phillip. When let go, Phillip and Toni get drinks to warm up, and Toni returns to Lee's apartment intoxicated. Sally does not believe Toni's story, and Lee fires her to make Toni his new fashion model. Toni turns out to be a poor fit as the style behind “Thornwood Girl” isn't expressed when she poses.

Lee travels to Chicago to try to finish his work, but ends up rejecting several models there until Sally appears. With her help, Lee is able to complete the illustration. Toni, still in New York, believes that her marriage to Lee is broken, so she gets ready to set sail back to Europe. Lee reads a newspaper that states Toni is announcing their divorce after ten days of marriage. Lee travels back to New York to find out that Martha was the one who arranged the newspaper interview to get him and Toni back together. The plan ends up working as the couple reconciles and wants to set sail for their European Honeymoon once again.

Lee then gets offered a commission he can't turn away from. The couple worries about who will be the new model as Betty Dennis ( Julie Bishop), Sally's sister, arrives. She has a strong similarity to Sally, so Lee starts to work as Toni asks Martha to start unpacking.

Lee then gets offered a commission he can't turn away from. The couple worries about who will be the new model as Betty Dennis ( Julie Bishop), Sally's sister, arrives. She has a strong similarity to Sally, so Lee starts to work as Toni asks Martha to start unpacking.

== Cast ==
- John Boles as Lee Thornwood
- Luli Deste as Toni Bonnet
- Frances Drake as Sally Dennis
- Helen Westley as Martha Moriarty
- Alexander D'Arcy as Phillip Corval
- Albert Dekker as Whitney Holton
- Marek Windheim as Jacques
- Franklin Pangborn as Paul
- Julie Bishop as Betty Dennis

== Bibliography ==
- Goble, Alan. The Complete Index to Literary Sources in Film. Walter de Gruyter, 1 Jan 1999.
