= Ignaz Schnitzer =

Austrian writer, journalist, translator, librettist and newspaper founder

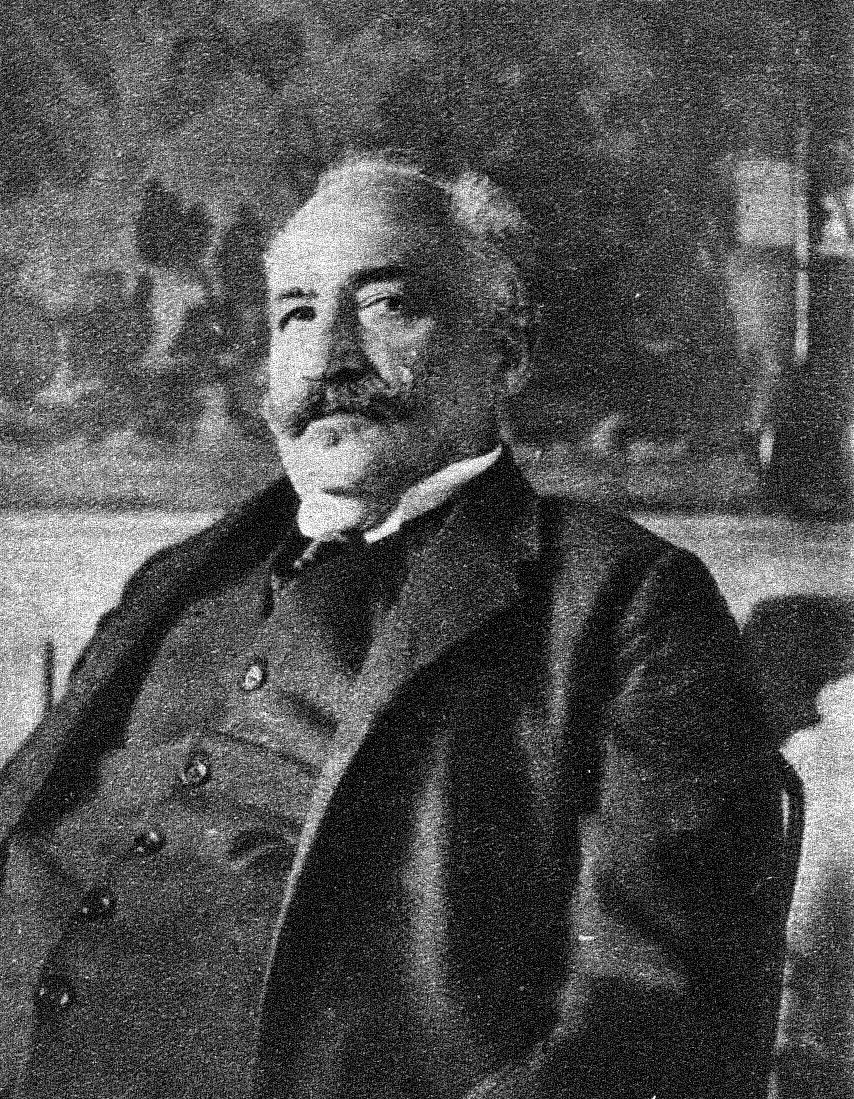
Ignaz Schnitzer

Ignaz Schnitzer (also Ignatz or Ignác Schnitzer; 4 December 1839 – 18 June 1921) was a journalist, translator, librettist and newspaper founder.

== Life ==
Schnitzer was born in Ratzersdorf (then Kingdom of Hungary, which is today a district of Bratislava, Slovakia). He began studying philosophy in Pest, but soon worked as a journalist. From 1857 he lived in Vienna and wrote for various newspapers, such as the Pester Lloyd and the Fremden-Blatt, as well as being an editor for the newspaper Der Fortschritt. In 1867 he returned to Budapest and was first a member of the editorial board of Bécsi Debatte. In 1869 he founded together with Zsigmond Bródy (1840–1906) the daily newspaper Neues Pester Journal, which he headed as editor-in-chief for a decade.

Besides he worked on Hungarian plays for German theatres; in 1879 he translated Ede Zsigligeti's Rauschgold for the Viennese Burgtheater and Mór Jókais Held Pálffy for the Carltheater.

After selling his share in the Neue Pester Journal he moved back to Vienna in 1881 and worked mainly as a librettist and translator. Schnitzer was particularly acclaimed for his translations and poems of the works of Sándor Petőfi into German. His friendship with Johann Strauss II led him to the libretto of his Zigeunerbaron and the cultural-historical and partly biographical work Bunte Geschichten aus der Johann-Strauß-Zeit.

As co-owner of the amusement park Venice in Vienna founded by Gabor Steiner, he organized the financing. He operated the construction of new sights, such as the Vienna Giant Ferris Wheel. In 1894 he had the idea of commissioning a circular painting entitled "Kaiser Franz Joseph und seine Zeit" (Emperor Franz Joseph and his Time) for the fiftieth anniversary of the reign of Emperor Franz Joseph I in 1898. It was executed by the history painter Philipp Fleischer, and exhibited at the Ausstellungsstraße 143 in a circular building specially designed for this purpose by Oskar Marmorek.

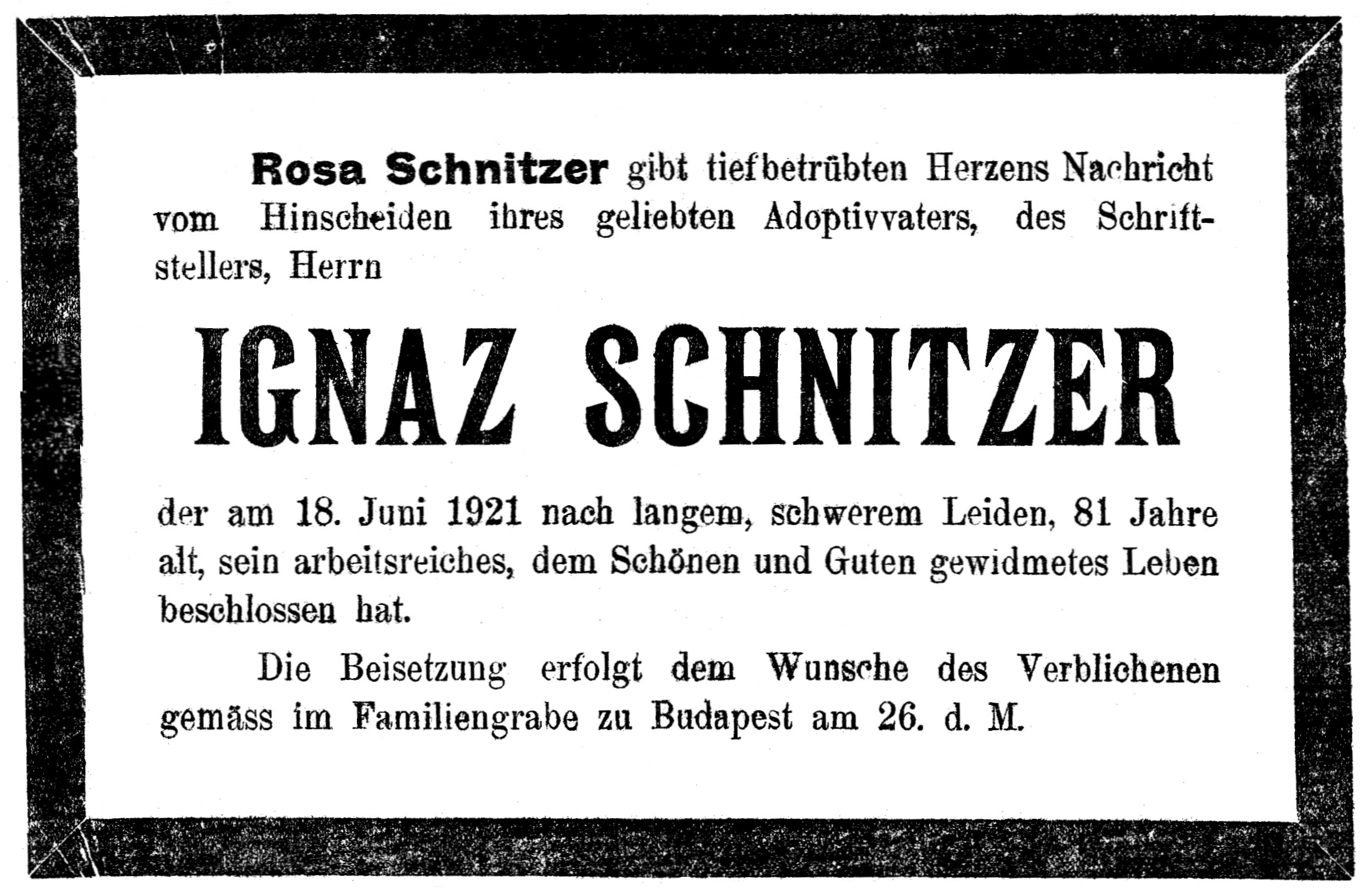
Death announcement in the NFP

Schnitzer was married to the daughter of a doctor, Gabriele, née Laszky (10 April 1846 in Gyöngyös – 28 September 1913 in Vienna). His grave is at the Kerepesi Cemetery in Budapest.

== Awards ==
Honorary memberships in the literary societies of Hungary, namely the Petőfi- and the Kisfaludy Society, and the Vienna Hungarian Society.

== Works ==
Compiled according to the catalogues of the Austrian National Library and the Wienbibliothek im Rathaus (as of January 2013).

=== Libretti ===
- Joggeli. Opera in three acts. Music by Wilhelm Taubert. 1853.
- Muzzedin. Romantic comic opera in 2 acts. Music by Siegmund Bachrich. 1883.
- The Gold Man. Play in 5 acts by Mór Jókai freely edited by Ignaz Schnitzer. Music by Joseph Hellmesberger Jr. 1885.
- The gypsy baron. Operetta in 3 acts after a story by Mór Jókai. Music by Johann Strauss (son). 1885.
- Rafaela. Comic opera in 3 acts by Adolph Schirmer and Ignaz Schnitzer. Music by Max Wolf. 1886.
- The Oracle. Operetta in 3 acts. With free use of a motif by Gregor Csiky. Music by Josef Hellmesberger junior. 1889
- "The Royal Bride. Romantic comic opera in 3 acts. Music by Robert Fuchs. 1889.
- Paris in Vienna. Decorative posse in 3 pictures. Text by F. Zell. Singing texts by Ignaz Schnitzer. Music by Josef Bayer. 1890.
- The Salzburg Bells. A Mozart piece in 4 pictures by Ignaz Schnitzer and Sigmund Schlesinger. Not set to music. Around 1890.
- Hussar blood. (also: The village judge). Operetta in 3 acts. Music by Hugo Felix. 1894.
- The Venus of Murán. Opera in three acts by Ignaz Schnitzer and Georg Verö. Not set to music. Around 1900.
- Kaspar (thus The beautiful Kaspar). Comic operetta in 3 acts. Text by F. Zell and Ignaz Schnitzer. Music by Josef Bayer. 1902.
- Bruder Straubinger. Operetta in 3 acts by Moritz West and Ignaz Schnitzer. Music by Edmund Eysler. 1903.
- Pufferl. Operetta in 3 acts by Sigmund Schlesinger and Ignaz Schnitzer. Music by Edmund Eysler. 1905.
- The electrician. Operetta in 3 acts by Sigmund Schlesinger and Ignaz Schnitzer. Music by Carl Josef Fromm. 1906.
- Tip Top. Operetta in 3 acts by Ignaz Schnitzer and Sigmund Schlesinger. Music by Josef Stritzko. 1907.
- Creole blood. Operetta in 3 acts by Ignaz Schnitzer and Emerich von Gatti. Music by Heinrich Berté. 1910.

=== Lieder texts ===
- Seltsame Geschichte. Chanson. Text after Samdo Petöfi. Music by Béla Laszky.
- Vater Radetzky ruft! Soldatenlied. Music by Franz Lehár. 1914.

=== Translations ===
- Eduard Szigligeti: Rauschgold. A comedy in three acts. After the Hungarian language. Hungaria, Budapest 1879.
- Gergely Csiky: Die Großmama. A comedy in three acts. After the Hungarian language. Entsch, Berlin 1892.
- Stephen Phillips: Herodes. Tragedy in three acts. German adaptation. Fischer, Vienna 1901.
- Sándor Petőfi: Poetische Werke in sechs Bänden. German adaptation. Halm & Goldmann, Vienna 1910.

=== Book publications ===
- Franz Joseph I. und seine Zeit. Cultur-historischer Rückblick auf die francisco-josephinische Epoche. Lechner, Vienna 1898.
- Meister Johann. Bunte Geschichten aus der Johann Strauß-Zeit. 2 volumes. Halm, Vienna 1920.
