= The Gypsy Baron =

1885 operetta by Johann Strauss II

Der Zigeunerbaron
- Operetta by Johann Strauss II
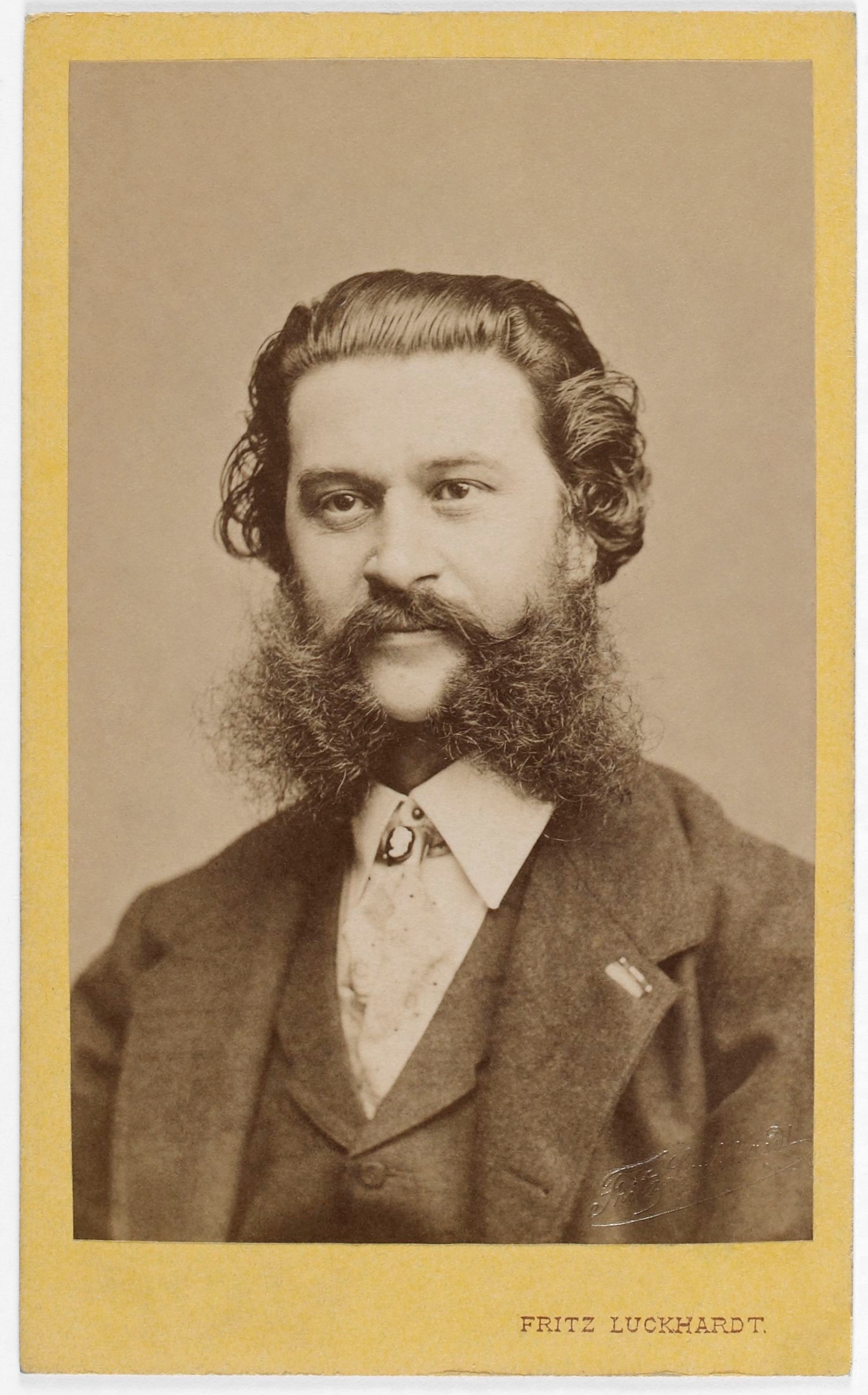
- Johann Strauss II
- Translation: The Gypsy Baron
- Librettist: Ignaz Schnitzer
- Language: German
- Based on: Saffi by Mór Jókai
- Premiere: 24 October 1885; Theater an der Wien, Vienna

The Gypsy Baron (German: Der Zigeunerbaron) is an operetta in three acts by Johann Strauss II which premiered at the Theater an der Wien on 24 October 1885. Its German libretto by Ignaz Schnitzer is based on the unpublished 1883 story Saffi by Mór Jókai. Jókai later published a novel A cigánybáró (English: The Gypsy Baron) in 1885 using an expanded version of this same story.

While an operetta, The Gypsy Baron was a departure from Strauss's earlier more comic and light hearted works; displaying more serious tones both musically and dramatically in what musicologist Andrew Lamb described as "a step in Strauss’s quest for the composition of a genuine opera". During the composer's lifetime, the operetta enjoyed great success internationally. It is considered one of Strauss's three best stage works, along with Die Fledermaus (1874) and Eine Nacht in Venedig (1883).

== Composition history ==
Strauss was introduced to Jókai's story prior to its publication as a novel in Pest, Hungary in February 1883 by his third wife Adele Deutsch. He dialogued with Jókai about adapting the story into an operetta soon after. Jókai recommended the Hungarian-Austrian writer Ignaz Schnitzer to Strauss as a librettist, and the two men created the work over a two-year period from 1883 through 1885. Its genesis was rather swift and smooth, as Strauss was no stranger to the Hungarian influences apparent in the music score. Many of his earlier works also bore similar themes, such as the polka Éljen a Magyar! ("Long live the Hungarians!"), Op. 332. Originally, Strauss and Schnitzer intended the operetta as an opera but further revisions were made and the idea of a comic opera was conceived.

Strauss' work on the operetta was interrupted in autumn 1883 due to nicotine poisoning and fainting fits and he was to recuperate in Franzensbad. Strauss' work on act 3 of the work was also interrupted when his wife Adele was taken ill and the couple left for Ostend. Not until autumn 1885 was the work finally completed, with Schnitzer making various revisions of the libretto to suit Strauss' style of composing which were not present in the latter's previous stage works.

== Performance history ==
=== Austria and Hungary ===
The Gypsy Baron premiered at the Theater an der Wien on 24 October 1885, and quickly became an international success; enjoying popularity during the remainder of Strauss's life. The composer continued to alter and cut material from the original score of the operetta following its premiere. A 1990 production staged by the Zürich Opera with music director Nikolaus Harnoncourt restored music from the original score under the guidance of Strauss specialist Norbert Linke. This music had not been heard since the original 1885 performances, and Teldec released a recording of this version with Harnoncourt conducting in 1995.

The opera has been regularly performed in the opera houses of Austria and Hungary since its premiere. The Hungarian premiere took place at the People's Theatre (Népszínház) in Budapest in the spring of 1886 with the composer conducting. In September 1901 the Theater an der Wien mounted a critically lauded revival of the operetta spearheaded by the theater's then director Wilhelm Karczag at a time when Austrian operetta had been largely supplanted in Vienna by operetta works from England. The production cemented The Gypsy Baron's place in the operatic canon and featured the popular actor Alexander Girardi in a reprisal of the role of Kálmán Zsupán from the original production. This staging of the operetta had an impact on Franz Lehár, and heavily influenced the development of his 1905 operetta The Merry Widow.

The operetta was first staged by the Vienna State Opera on December 26, 1910 with conductor Felix Weingartner leading the musical forces. That house staged an elaborate production of the work in 1976. The operetta is part of the regular repertory of the Vienna Volksoper. In 1999 the opera was staged at multiple opera houses in Vienna in celebration of the 100th anniversary of the composer's death; including the Vienna State Opera, the Vienna Volksoper, the Wiener Kammeroper, and the Theater an der Wien.

=== United States and UK ===
The US premiere took place on 15 February 1886 at the Casino Theatre on Broadway with tenor William Castle in the title role and soprano Pauline Hall as Saffi. It was first staged by the Metropolitan Opera exactly 20 years later on 15 February 1906 with Andreas Dippel in the title role, Bella Alten as Saffi, Louise Homer as Czipra, Otto Goritz as Kálmán Zsupá, Marie Rappold as Arsena, and Nahan Franko conducting. Both the original Broadway and Met stagings were produced by Heinrich Conried. The Met staged the opera again in 1959 with Nicolai Gedda as Sándor Barinkay, Lisa Della Casa as Saffi, Regina Resnik as Czipra, Walter Slezak as Kálmán Zsupán, Laurel Hurley as Arsena, Paul Franke as Ottokar, Mignon Dunn as Mirabella, and Erich Leinsdorf conducting.

Other notable performances in New York City included two presentations of the opera by the New York Philharmonic; first at Lewisohn Stadium in 1942 in a production staged by Herbert Graf and starring Margit Bokor as Saffi; and second, in 1995 with tenor Stanford Olsen in the title role at Avery Fisher Hall under the baton of Kurt Masur. The New York City Opera (NYCO) mounted the work during the company's first season in 1944 with William Wymetal staging the opera using an English language translation by conductor George Mead. The original NYCO cast included William Horne in the title role and Marguerite Piazza and Polyna Stoska alternating as Saffi under the baton of Laszlo Halasz. The company repeated the production the following year with Gordon Dilworth as Barinkay and Brenda Lewis as Saffi.

In 1939 the Los Angeles Civic Light Opera staged the work using an English language translation by composer and lyricist Ann Ronell. This translation was published by G. Schirmer, Inc. in 1940, and has been widely used in English language recordings and stagings of the work.

In the UK The Gypsy Baron was first performed on 12 February 1935 in an amateur production. The UK professional premiere took place on 10 March 1938 at the Theatre Royal, Nottingham, as part of the Carl Rosa Opera Company's spring season there.

Strauss's music for The Gypsy Baron is still regularly performed today. The orchestral pieces that he furnished from the work were also well-recognised, among them, the sparkling Schatz-Walzer (Treasure Waltz), Op. 418, as well as the polkas "Brautschau" ("Looking for a Wife"), Op. 417, and "Kriegsabenteuer" ("War Adventures"), Op. 419.

== Roles ==
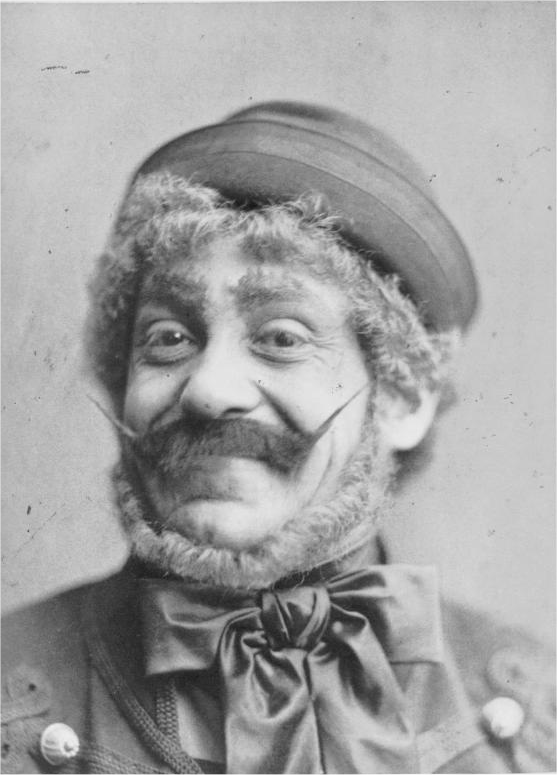
Alexander Girardi as Kálmán Zsupán

Roles, voice types, premiere cast
Role	Voice type	Premiere cast, 24 October 1885 Conductor: Johann Strauss II
Count Peter Homonay, Governor of Temeşvar Province	baritone	Josef Josephi
Conte Carnero, Royal Commissioner	tenor	Mr Friese
Sándor Barinkay, a young exile	tenor	Karl Streitmann
Kálmán Zsupán, a wealthy pig farmer of the Banat district	tenor buffo	Alexander Girardi
Arsena, his daughter	soprano	Miss Reisser
Mirabella, governess to Zsupán's daughter	mezzo-soprano	Mrs Schäfer
Ottokar, her son	tenor	Mr Holbach
Czipra, a gypsy woman	mezzo-soprano	Miss Hartmann
Saffi, a gypsy girl	soprano	Ottilie Collin
Pali, a gypsy	baritone	Mr Eppich
The Mayor of Vienna	speaking role	Mr Liebold
Seppl, a link-boy	speaking role	Mr Horwitz
Miksa, a boatman	speaking role	Mr Schwellak
István, Zsupán's servant	speaking role	Mr Hellwig
Józsi, Ferkó, Mihály, Jáncsi, gypsies, Irma, Tercsi, Aranka, Katicza, Julcsa, Etelka, Jolán, Ilka, Arsena's friends

== Synopsis ==
Overview: The story, of the marriage of a landowner (returned from exile) and a gypsy girl who is revealed as the daughter of a Turkish pasha, and the rightful owner of a hidden treasure, involves a fortune-telling Romany queen, a self-important mayor, a rascally commissioner, a military governor, a band of gypsies and a troop of hussars.

Overture to The Gypsy Baron
Performed in 1991 by the U.S. Marine Band (7:22)

Place: Hungary and Austria
Time: Late 18th century

=== Act 1 ===
A swampy riverside region near the town of Timișoara

The distant scene is dominated by a derelict castle. In the foreground is a partly deserted village with only one reasonably prosperous-looking house. In a particularly disreputable hut there lives an old gypsy woman named Czipra. The boatmen can be heard singing at their work. Ottokár, son of Mirabella who is governess to Arsena (daughter of a miserly old farmer Zsupán) is digging for treasure which he fondly believes to be buried somewhere around. This is his daily routine, and the more he looks without success, the worse his temper becomes. Czipra looks out of her window and makes fun of his efforts. She has been watching him for weeks and has a low opinion of his wasting time on this activity while the other Gypsies are out doing an "honest" day's work. She tells him that if he continues with this fruitless quest, he will end up penniless and never marry, as he hopes, Arsena.

Sándor Barinkay, son of the late owner of the castle, arrives accompanied by Conte Carnero, Commissioner for Oaths, who is here to sort things out for him. The Commissioner suggests they get on with the job and call on Czipra as a witness. They send for Zsupán. In the meantime he tells Barinkay of the beautiful Arsena. To pass time Czipra tells their fortunes and reveals to Sándor Barinkay that there is happiness and fortune in store for him. He will marry a faithful wife who will, in a dream, discover where the treasure is hidden. Carnero is also told that he will recover a treasure that he has lost, which leaves him slightly puzzled as he cannot remember having had one.

Zsupán arrives and tells everyone that he is a highly successful pig-breeder adding that he lives for sausages and wine and has little time for art. He agrees to witness Barinkay's claims but warns him that he can be a contentious neighbour. Barinkay suggests that he might marry Zsupán's daughter and Arsena is sent for. But it is Mirabella, the governess, who first appears. It seems that she is Carnero's long-lost wife, so part of Czipra's prediction is immediately realised. Carnero shows little sign of delight and a rather joyless reunion takes place. Mirabella says that she had believed her husband to have been killed at the Battle of Belgrade.

Arsena arrives, heavily veiled, but though the chorus hail the bride-elect she is not so co-operative. She is in love with Ottokár. Barinkay makes a formal proposal but Arsena tells him that she is descended from the aristocracy and can only marry someone of noble birth. Zsupán and the others tell Barinkay that he must do something about this. He is left brooding but hears a gypsy girl singing a song which praises the loyalty of the Gypsies to their friends. It is Saffi, daughter of Czipra, and Barinkay is immediately attracted by her dark beauty and accepts an invitation to dine with her and Czipra. Unaware of the others watching, Ottokár meets Arsena and they vow their eternal love for each other. He gives her a locket at which point Barinkay pretends to be most indignant. The Gypsies return from their work and Czipra introduces Barinkay as their new local squire. They elect him chief of the Gypsies. Now affirmed as a gypsy baron he calls on Zsupán and asserts his noble right of the hand of Arsena. Zsupán is not all that impressed. Saffi welcomes Barinkay back to his inheritance. Ever the opportunist, Barinkay now says that he would like to marry Saffi who is as delighted as her gypsy friends. Zsupán and Arsena are now rather indignant at this turn of events and threaten reprisals.

=== Act 2 ===
At the castle at dawn the following day

Czipra reveals to Barinkay that Saffi has dreamed of the location of the treasure. They start to search and find it hidden, as she has dreamed, under a nearby rock. As they depart the Gypsies arise to start their day's work. Zsupán appears and tells them that his cart has stuck in the mud. He orders the Gypsies to come and help him. They resent his order and steal his watch and money. His cries for help bring Carnero, Mirabella, Ottokár and Arsena on the scene, followed by Barinkay, now dressed as a gypsy baron, and Saffi. Barinkay introduces Saffi as his wife but Carnero is not satisfied that all the legal requirements have been met. They tell him the stars have guided them and the birds have witnessed their vows. This is not quite what the law demands and Mirabella and Zsupán adopt a highly moral tone about the whole affair. At this point Ottokár discovers a few of the gold coins that Barinkay has left behind and is highly excited. Barinkay soon disillusions him by telling him that the treasure has already been found. At this moment, a recruiting party arrives under the command of Barinkay's old friend, Count Peter Homonay. He is looking for recruits to fight in the war against Spain. Zsupán and Ottokár are press-ganged into the army. Carnero calls on Homonay to give his official support to the view that Barinkay and Saffi's marriage is illegal but Homonay supports Barinkay. Further complications, however, are revealed. Czipra tells them that Saffi is not really her daughter but the child of the last Pasha of Hungary, a real princess. Barinkay is once more deflated, realising that he cannot marry anyone of such exalted rank, though Saffi says that she will always love him. Barinkay decides that he too will join the Hussars and the men march away leaving behind three broken hearted ladies.

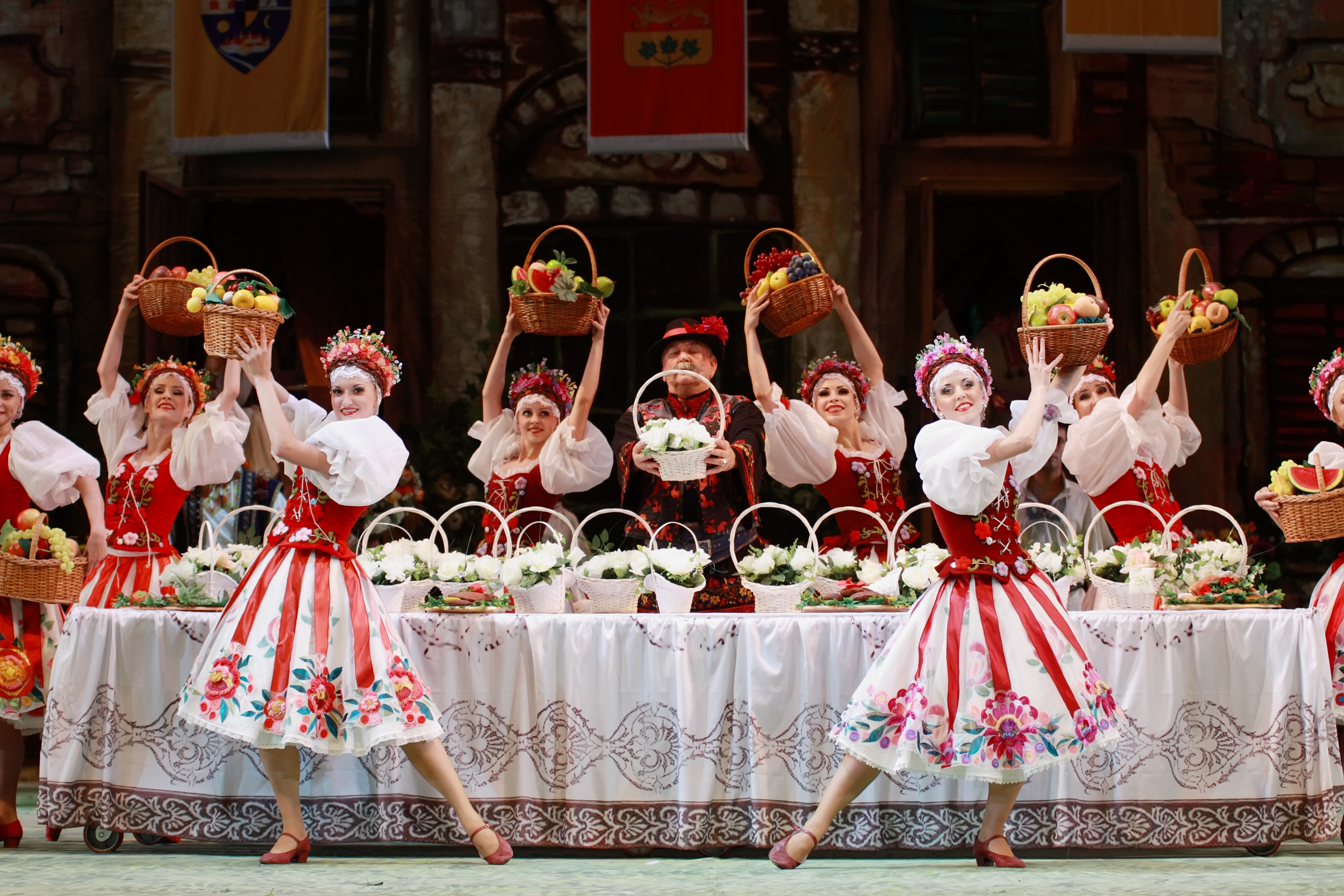
Scene from The Gypsy Baron

=== Act 3 ===
A grand celebration in Vienna

People are celebrating after a victorious battle. Zsupán appears and tells of his own, somewhat inglorious, exploits in Spain. Homonay, Barinkay and Ottokár reveal that they are heroes of battle and have been made into noblemen. There is now no objection to the marriage of Saffi and Barinkay or Ottokár and Arsena. It is a happy ending.

== Selected recordings ==
- 1986: Willi Boskovsky (cond.), Münchner Rundfunkorchester and Bayerischer Rundfunk chorus. Cast: Graf Homonay: Dietrich Fischer-Dieskau; Conte Carnero: Klaus Hirte; Sandor Barinkay: Josef Protschka; Kalman Zsupan: Walter Berry; Arsena: Brigitte Lindner; Mirabella: Ilse Gramatzki; Ottokar: Martin Finke; Czipra: Hanna Schwarz; Saffi: Júlia Várady; Pali: Ralf Lukas. CD: EMI Cat: CDS 7 49231-8
- 2004: Armin Jordan (cond): Orchestre National de France and Choeur de Radio France. Cast: Graf Homonay: Béla Perencz; Conte Carnero: Paul Kong; Sandor Barinkay: Zoran Todorovich (Todorovic); Kalman Zsupan: Rudolf Wasserlof; Arsena: Jeannette Fischer; Mirabella: Hanna Schaer; Ottokar: Martin Homrich; Czipra: Ewa Wolak; and Saffi: Natalia Ushakova. CD: Naïve Cat: V 5002 (Recorded at the Festival de Radio France et Montpellier)
- 2016. Lawrence Foster (cond.). Nikolai Schukoff, Jochen Schmeckenbecher, Markus Brück, Jasmina Sakr, Claudia Barainsky, Heinz Zednik, Paul Kaufmann, Khatuna Mikaberidze, Renate Pitscheider, NDR Philharmonie, NDR Chor. PENTATONE PTC 5186482 (1886 version)
