= Bruder Straubinger =

- Operetta by Edmund Eysler
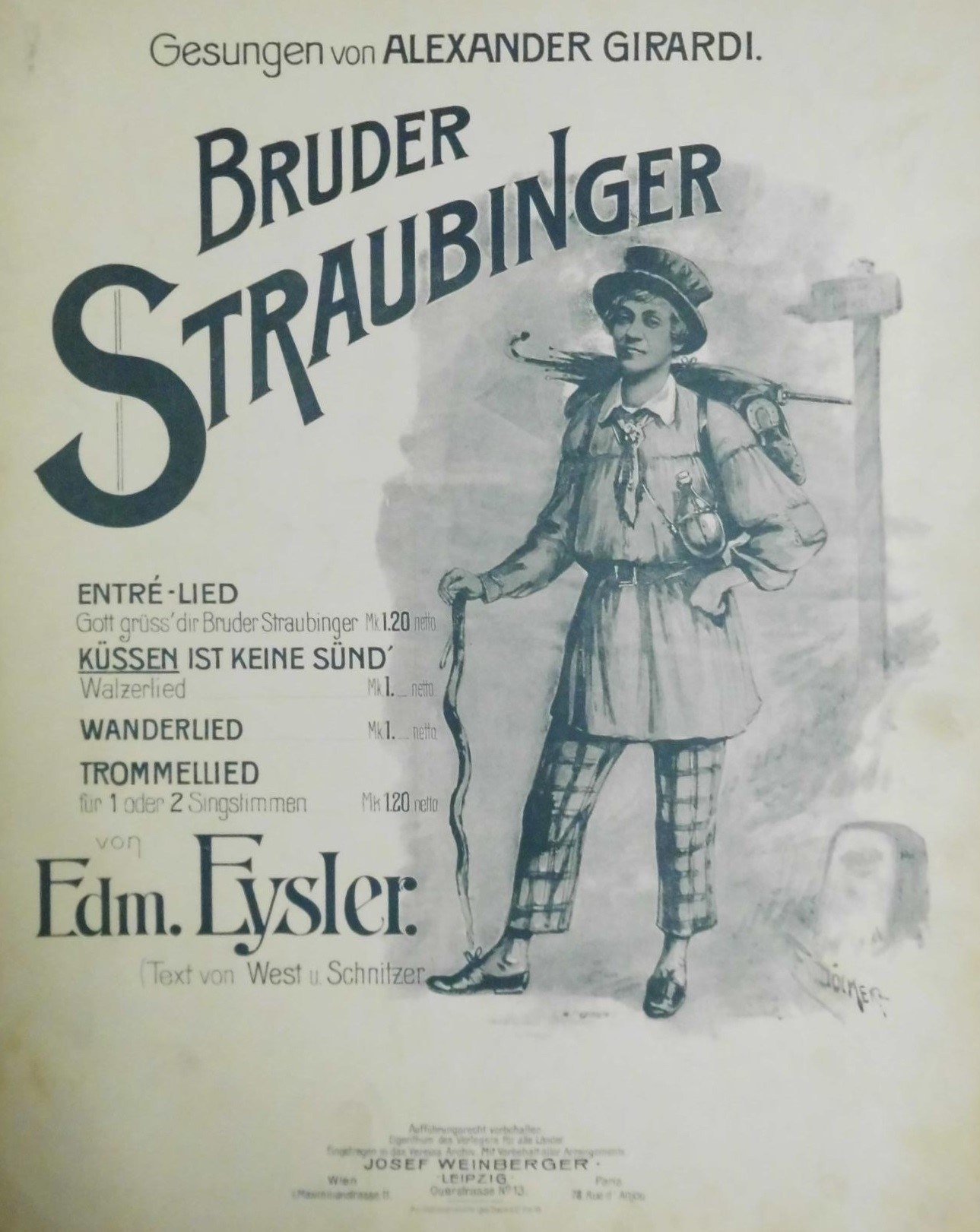
- Sheet music for four of the operetta's arias depicting Alexander Girardi in the title role
- Librettist: Ignaz Schnitzer; Moritz West
- Language: German
- Premiere: 20 February 1903; Theater an der Wien, Vienna

Bruder Straubinger (Brother Straubinger) is an operetta in three acts composed by Edmund Eysler to a German-language libretto by Moritz West and Ignaz Schnitzer. It premiered at the Theater an der Wien in Vienna on 20 February 1903 with Alexander Girardi in the title role.

== Background ==
Eysler's operetta takes its name and the personality of its protagonist from the popular fictional figure "Bruder Straubinger", a travelling craftsman from Straubing who first appeared in an early 19th century student drinking song by Carl Theodor Müller, a medical student in Straubing. The character became the archetype of an industrious but carefree and cheerful wanderer.

Bruder Straubinger was the second of Eysler's operettas to be staged. He had composed a previous opera to a libretto by Ignaz Schnitzer with the title Der Hexenspiel (The Magic Mirror). The music publisher Josef Weinberger was impressed with it and tried unsuccessfully to get it staged. He then suggested that Eysler incorporate some of the lighter pieces from the work into a new operetta. The result was Bruder Straubinger which was an immediate success at its premiere, owing in part to its star tenor, Alexander Girardi, in the title role. However, Richard Traubner attributes a larger part of its success to Girardi's second-act waltz aria "Küssen ist keine Sünd" ("Kissing Is No sin"). The song was published separately by Weinberger and in a short time sold more than 100,000 copies. It later inspired the title of the 1950 German film Kissing Is No Sin and is featured in its soundtrack.

== Recordings ==
A full-length recording of Bruder Straubinger was released on CD by Cantus Classics in 2017. Recorded live in 1951 by the Stuttgart Radio Symphony Orchestra conducted by Fritz Mareczek, it features Willy Reichert in the title role and Olga Noll as Oculi. (Catalog number: LC 502014)

Its most famous aria, "Küssen ist keine Sünd", has been recorded by Richard Tauber and Hermann Prey, amongst others.
