= Luli Deste =

German-American actress (1902–1951)

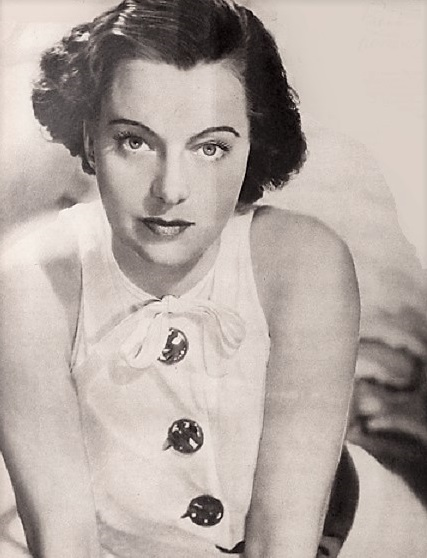
- Luli Deste (Luli von Hohenberg) in 1936
- Born: Julie Dorothea von Bodenhausen-Degener; 7 November 1902; Heidelberg, German Empire
- Died: 7 July 1951 (aged 48); New York City, U.S.
- Other names: Luli von Hohenberg, Dorothea
- Occupation: Actress
- Years active: 1932–1941 (film)
- Children: 1. Baron Gottfried von Meyern-Hohenberg alias Goli (1924 - 1995)
- Relatives: Baron Christophe von Hohenberg (von Meyern-Hohenberg) (b.1952 ) (grandson) (photographer) - Baron Nicholas von Hohenberg (Niki) (von Meyern-Hohenberg) (1962 - 2017) (grandson)

Luli Deste (née Julie Dorothea von Bodenhausen-Degener; 7 November 1902 – 7 July 1951) was a German-American stage and film actress.

== Career ==
Deste studied dancing with Mary Wigman in Berlin but changed to acting. She was an understudy to Elisabeth Bergner, acted in repertory theater, and progressed to leading roles in Vienna, after which she acted in London.

In London, Deste acted in films directed by Marion Gering. After he put her under personal contract, he brought her to the United States and directed her films for Columbia Pictures. Her Hollywood film debut came in 1937, and she later acted for Universal Pictures.

== Personal life ==
Deste was married to Baron Gottfried von Meyern-Hohenberg, and they were divorced in 1930.

She authored the book Come, Take My Hand as Luli Kollsman, published by Duell, Sloan and Pearce (c.1949), New York, 1949.

In 1944 Deste married Paul Kollsman in New York City; she died in 1951.

== Filmography ==
Year	Title	Role	Notes
1932	My Friend the King	Countess Zena	
1936	Thank You, Madame	Corinne Dalma	
1936	Silhouettes	Lydia Sanina	
1937	Thunder in the City	Lady Patricia	
1937	She Married an Artist	Toni Bonnet	
1939	Ursula Under Suspicion	Ursula von Tweel	
1940	Flash Gordon Conquers the Universe	Queen Fria	Serial, [Chs. 1-2], Uncredited
1940	Ski Patrol	Julia Engel	
1940	South to Karanga	Julia Garrett	
1941	The Case of the Black Parrot	Madame de Charriere	
1941	Outlaws of the Desert	Marie Karitza	(final film role)

== Bibliography ==
- Robert McLaughlin. We'll Always Have the Movies: American Cinema during World War II. University Press of Kentucky, 2006.
