= Fritz Moegle =

Austrian art director (1916–1986)

- Born: 6 June 1916; Vienna, Austro-Hungarian Empire
- Died: 20 May 1986 (aged 69); Vienna, Austria
- Other name: Fritz Mögle
- Occupation: Art director
- Years active: 1948-1962 (film)

Fritz Moegle (6 June 1916 – 20 May 1986) was an Austrian art director active in the post-war film industry.

== Selected filmography ==
- White Shadows (1951)
- Adventure in Vienna (1952)
- The Little Czar (1954)
- I'm Marrying the Director (1960)
- Man in the Shadows (1961)

== Bibliography ==
- Fritsche, Maria. Homemade Men in Postwar Austrian Cinema: Nationhood, Genre and Masculinity. Berghahn Books, 2013.
