= Helene Odilon =

German stage actress

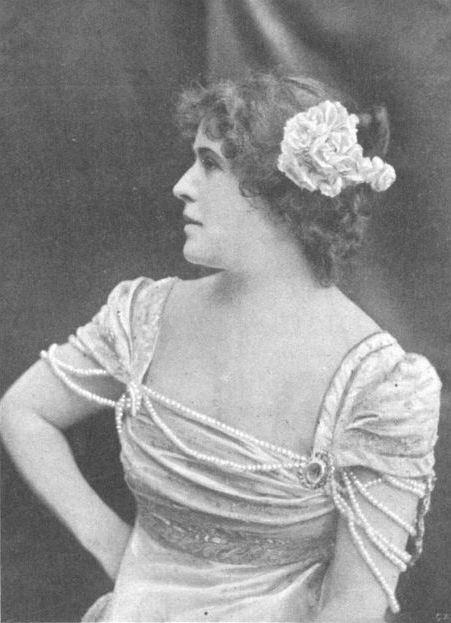
- Helen Odilon
- Born: 1865
- Died: 1939 (aged 73–74)
- Occupation: Stage actress

Helene Odilon (1865–1939) was a German stage actress. Her acting career began while she was the apprentice of German stage actor Ludwig Barnay. In 1902, she was reported to be "currently the greatest actress in Germany". Odilon was known for her comedic ingénue roles. She was born in Northern Germany.

== Career ==
Odilon started acting as the apprentice of German stage actor Ludwig Barnay at his Berlin theater. In the early 1890s, she traveled to the Volkstheater in Vienna to replace actress Adele Sandrock. In Berlin, Odilon was best known for her ingénue roles and it was believed that she was more suited towards comedy in those roles. She was one of the few German actresses of the time to be successful in London.

Her first role in New York was in the play The Star, which was shown at the Irving Place Theatre. The Star was written by Herman Bahr, a well known dramatist from Vienna. In 1903, the actress Adele Hartwig replaced her in the revival of the drama Nachtmar at the Volkstheater because Odilon had a stroke. Critics in Vienna were unimpressed by Hartwig's performance.

== Marriages ==
Odilon was married to Alexander Girardi and she had an affair with a financier. Girardi discovered Odilon's chemise in the financier's bedroom and he threatened to murder both of them. After Odilon and the financier contacted the police and the officers did not arrest Girardi, the two of them attempted to have Girardi committed to an insane asylum. After Girardi discovered their plan, he received help from a former mistress of Franz Joseph I of Austria, Käthe Schratt. After Shratt helped Girardi, he had a hushed divorce with Odilon.

After the divorce, Odilon married Baron Rakovsky. Sometime after she divorced Rakovsky, she married Herr Flesch, the man who rescued her from a sanitarium after she was declared insane after she had paralysis due to a stroke. A 1912 article from the St. Louis Post-Dispatch said that Odilon proposed to marry Budapest doctor Radwan—who hypnotized susceptible people including older women—while she was hypnotized by him. The article also stated that she was building a séance hall for him in Budapest.

== Later years ==
A 1922 article from the New York Herald stated that Odilon was in poverty and was almost blind. Odilon tried to earn money by selling postcard photographs in a Vienna tearoom so that she could buy a home. Despite not many of the guests remembering Odilon's career, she received donations which also included a basket of flowers that had banknotes at the bottom of it. Odilon died in 1939.

== Reception ==
A Public Opinion article published in 1901 said, "Her methods are free from artificiality, and her aim is plainly a realism made effective by art". A 1902 article from the magazine Philharmonic stated, "She is said to have an enormous repertoire, her histrionic power having a wide range of expression". The article also said that she was "said to be currently the greatest actress in Germany". Odilon was named the "Bernhardt of Germany" and during her appearances in the United States, she was compared to Gabrielle Réjane.
