= Robert Fuchs (composer) =

Austrian composer and music teacher (1847–1927)

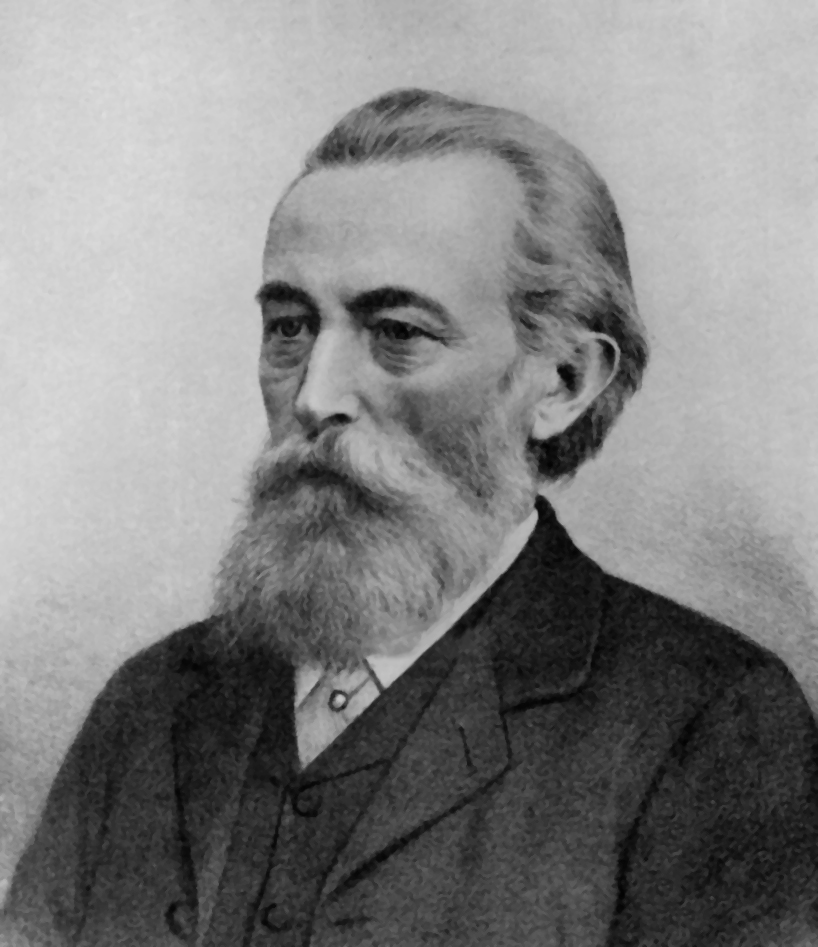

Background information
- Born: 15 February 1847; Frauental an der Laßnitz, Styria, Austria
- Died: 19 February 1927 (aged 80) Vienna, Austria
- Genres: Classical, romantic
- Occupations: Composer, music teacher
- Formerly of: University of Music and Performing Arts

Robert Fuchs (15 February 1847 – 19 February 1927) was an Austrian composer and music teacher. As Professor of music theory at the Vienna Conservatory, Fuchs taught many notable composers, while he was himself a highly regarded composer in his lifetime.

== Biography ==
He was born in Frauental an der Laßnitz, Styria, Austria in 1847. He studied at the Vienna Conservatory with Felix Otto Dessoff and Joseph Hellmesberger among others. He eventually secured a teaching position there and was appointed Professor of music theory in 1875. He retained the position until 1912. He died in Vienna in 1927.

He was the youngest brother of Johann Nepomuk Fuchs, who was also a composer and an opera conductor.

Robert Fuchs taught many notable composers, See: List of music students by teacher: C to F#Robert Fuchs.

== Notability ==
"Unfailingly tuneful and enjoyable, Robert Fuchs's piano trios are an easily accessible way to get to know a composer whom Brahms greatly admired," noted the magazine Gramophone. "In his time Fuchs was very highly regarded, with one critic famously pointing to Fuchsisms in Mahler's Second Symphony."

The reason his compositions did not become better known was largely that he did little to promote them, living a quiet life in Vienna and refusing to arrange concerts, even when the opportunities arose. He certainly had his admirers, among them Brahms, who almost never praised the works of other composers. But with regard to Fuchs, Brahms wrote, "Fuchs is a splendid musician, everything is so fine and so skillful, so charmingly invented, that one is always pleased." Famous contemporary conductors, including Arthur Nikisch, Felix Weingartner and Hans Richter, championed his works when they had the opportunity with few exceptions, but it was his chamber music which was considered his finest work.

In his lifetime, his best known works were his five serenades; their popularity was so great that Fuchs acquired the nickname "Serenaden-Fuchs" ("Serenader Fox"). The serenades have been recorded by the Cologne Chamber Orchestra under Christian Ludwig for Naxos.

== List of compositions ==
=== Orchestral ===
- Symphonies
  - Symphony No. 1 in C major, Op. 37
  - Symphony No. 2 in E♭ major, Op. 45
  - Symphony No. 3 in E major, Op. 79
- Serenades
  - Serenade for string orchestra No. 1 in D major, Op. 9
  - Serenade for string orchestra No. 2 in C major, Op. 14
  - Serenade for string orchestra No. 3 in E minor, Op. 21
  - Serenade for string orchestra and 2 horns in G minor, Op. 51
  - Serenade for small orchestra in D major, Op. 53
- Andante grazioso & Capriccio for string orchestra, Op.63
- Piano Concerto in B♭ minor, Op.27

=== Vocal ===
- Operas
  - Die Königsbraut, in 3 acts, Op.46 (1889) (librettist: Ignaz Schnitzer) premiered in Vienna
  - Die Teufelsglocke, in 3 acts (w/o Op.) (1891) (librettist: Bernhard Buchbinder)
- Choral works
  - Mass in G, Op. 108
  - Mass in D minor, Op. 116
  - Mass in F, without opus number

=== Chamber ===
- Quintets
  - Quintet for clarinet and string quartet in E♭ major, Op. 102
- Quartets
  - String Quartet No. 1 in E major, Op. 58
  - String Quartet No. 2 in A minor, Op. 62
  - String Quartet No. 3 in C major, Op. 71
  - String Quartet No. 4 in A major, Op. 106
  - Piano Quartet No. 1 in G minor, Op. 15
  - Piano Quartet No. 2 in B minor, Op. 75
- Trios
  - Trio in F♯ minor for violin, viola, and piano, Op. 115
  - Seven Fantasy Pieces for violin, viola and piano, Op. 57
  - String Trio in A major, Op. 94
  - Piano Trio No.1 in C major, Op. 22
  - Piano Trio No.2 in B♭ major, Op. 72
  - Piano Trio No.3 in F# minor, Op. 115
  - Terzetti (trios for two violins and viola) Op. 61 Nos. 1 in E minor, 2 in D minor
  - Terzetto in C♯ minor, Op. 107
- Duos
  - Two Violins
    - Twenty Duos, Op. 55
    - Phantasiestücke, Op. 105 (16 duos)
  - Violin and Viola
    - Twelve Duets, Op. 60
  - Violin and Piano
    - Violin Sonata No. 1 in F♯ minor, Op. 20
    - Violin Sonata No. 2 in D major, Op. 33
    - Violin Sonata No. 3 in D minor, Op. 68
    - Violin Sonata No. 4 in E major, Op. 77
    - Violin Sonata No. 5 in A major, Op. 95
    - Violin Sonata No. 6 in G minor, Op.103
    - Ten Fantasy Pieces for violin and piano, Op. 74
  - Viola and Piano
    - Viola Sonata in D minor, Op. 86
    - Six Fantasies for viola and piano, Op. 117
  - Cello and Piano
    - Cello Sonata No. 1 in D minor, Op. 29
    - Cello Sonata No. 2 in E♭ minor, Op. 83
    - Seven Fantasy Pieces for cello and piano, Op. 78
  - Double-Bass and Piano
    - Double Bass Sonata, B♭ major, Op. 97
    - Three Pieces for Double Bass and Piano, Op. 96

=== Solo ===
- Organ
  - Fantasia in C major, Op. 87
  - Fantasia in E minor, Op. 91
  - Fantasia in D♭ major, Op. 101
  - Variations and Fugue on an Original Theme
- Piano
  - Improvisation for Piano, Op. 11
  - Piano Sonata No. 1 in G♭ major, Op. 19
  - Piano Sonata No. 2 in G minor, Op. 88
  - Piano Sonata No. 3 in D♭ major, Op. 109
  - Jugendklänge, Op. 32
  - Lieb' Schwesterlein (Dear Little Sister), Op. 32, No. 14
  - Twelve Waltzes, Op.110
  - 4 Klavierstücke, Op.111
  - Dewdrops (Tautropfen), Thirteen Pieces for Piano, Op. 112
- Harp
  - Harp Fantasy, Op. 85

== See also ==
- List of Austrians in music
