= Josef Bayer =

Austrian composer (1852–1913)

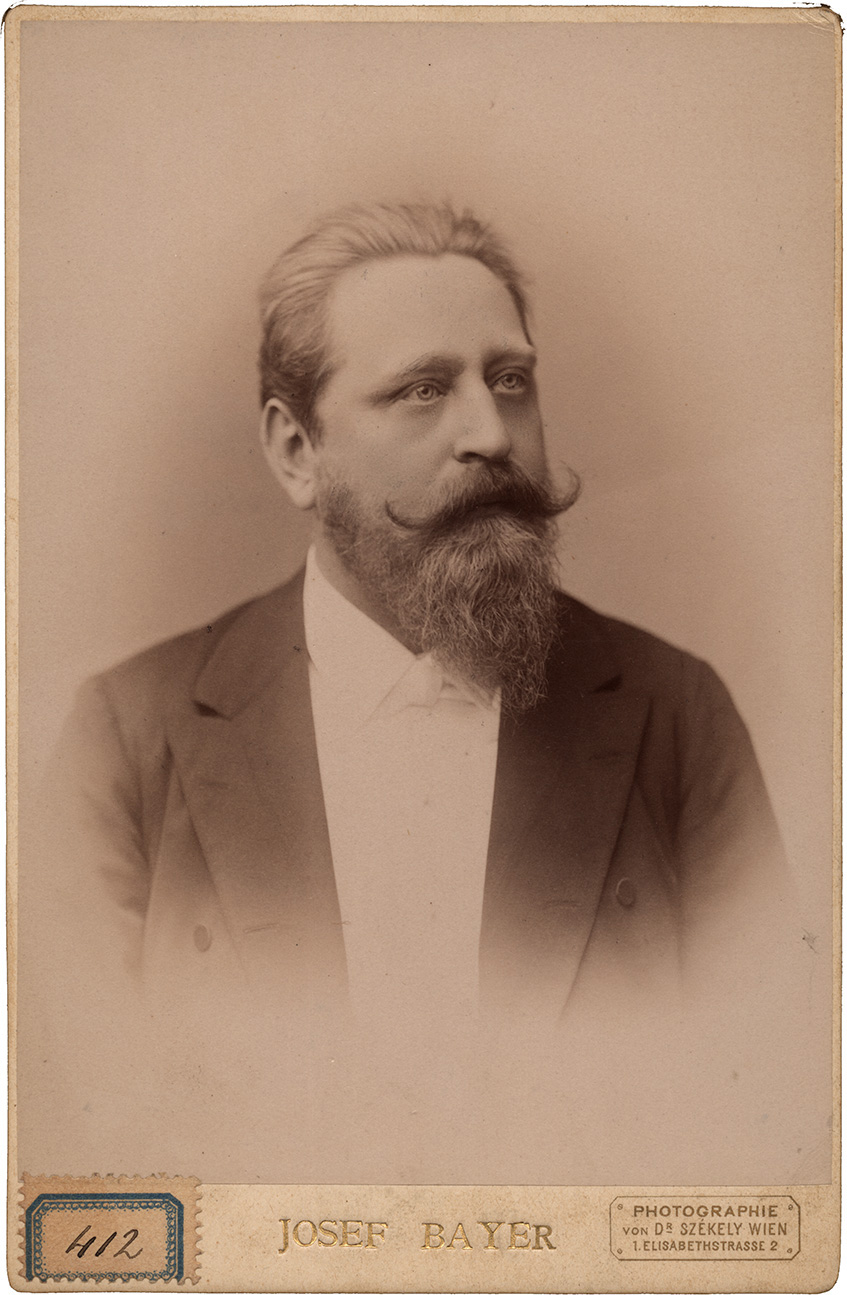
Josef Bayer

Josef Bayer (6 March 1852 – 12 March 1913) was an Austrian composer and the director of the Austrian Court Ballet from 1883 until his death. He was born and died in Vienna.

== Biography ==
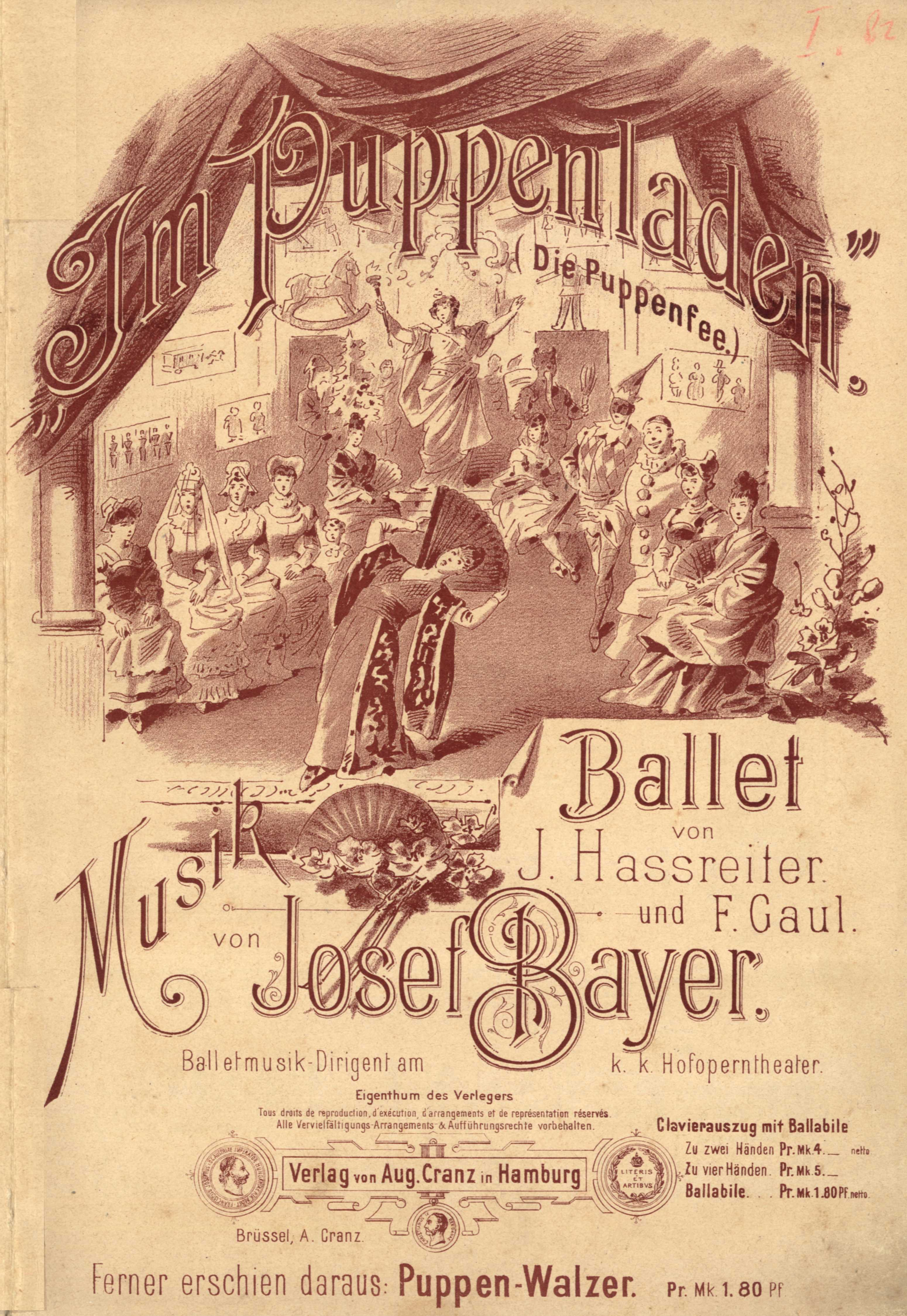
Cover of the piano score of Im Puppenladen, later revised to Die Puppenfee

He studied at the Vienna Conservatory under the elder Josef Hellmesberger, Anton Bruckner and Otto Dessoff, and was a violinist in the Wiener Hofoper (the Vienna Court Opera Orchestra) from 1870 to 1898. In 1883 he was appointed Court Kapellmeister.

Though he created over twenty one-act ballets including Die Braut von Korea, he is remembered for Die Puppenfee ("The Fairy Doll") of 1888, which began life as Im Puppenladen ("In the Doll Shop"). It was the definitive Austrian court ballet, and remains in the repertory of the Vienna State Opera.

Bayer was also friends with the Viennese waltz composer Johann Strauss II and it was Bayer who completed the unfinished Strauss Cinderella ballet, Aschenbroedel in 1900, Strauss having died in 1899 leaving a completed draft of the work lacking its orchestration. Earlier, Bayer commemorated Strauss' golden anniversary as conductor and composer with Bayer's specially composed ballet "Rund um Wien" in 1894, which was performed at the Vienna State Opera.

Bayer also composed several operettas including Der Chevalier von San Marco (1882), Mister Menelaus (1896), Fräulein Hexe (1898), Der Polizeichef (1904), Spitzbub & Cie (1907), and Das Damenduell (1907).

He is buried in the Zentralfriedhof, Vienna.
