= Michael Birkmeyer =

Austrian baller master and choreographer

Michael Birkmeyer (born 20 October 1943) is an Austrian ballet dancer, choreographer, former artistic director and manager of the Festspielhaus St. Pölten as well as presenter.

== Life ==
Born in Vienna, Birkmeyer comes from a family that has produced dancers for several generations. His father, Toni Birkmeyer, was a principal dancer at the Vienna State Opera and director of the Vienna State Opera Ballet School. Birkmeyer received his first lessons from his father; later he studied with the dancer Victor Gsovsky, the husband of the dancer Tatjana Gsovsky, in Paris. He received his first engagement with the Vienna State Opera Ballet in 1960. Further private studies were with Rudolf Nureyev, who later became Birkmeyer's mentor. With Nureyev he worked on solo parts in his choreography of Swan Lake. Later he took on the role of Prince Siegfried in Nureyev's choreography.

In 1967, Birkmeyer became principal dancer at the Vienna State Opera. In 1972, he became principal solo dancer there. He was Principal Solo Dancer there up to and including the 1987/1988 season. Birkmeyer danced the leading roles of the classical ballet repertoire as well as in modern ballet choreographies throughout his career. He has performed in choreographies by George Balanchine, Hans van Manen, Maurice Béjart, John Cranko, Rudi van Dantzig, Tom Schilling and Wacław Orlikowski.

Among his most notable roles were Tancredi in the ballet of the same name by Hans Werner Henze, the title role in the ballet The Pagoda Prince by Benjamin Britten and Romeo in Romeo and Juliet choreographed by John Cranko. At the Vienna State Opera he also danced with Lilly Scheuermann in the ballet Daphnis et Chloé by Maurice Ravel.

Birkmeyer made guest appearances at the Royal Opera House in London, in South America, Cuba and in Japan as part of several tours of the Vienna State Opera. At the American Ballet Theatre in New York City, he danced solo roles in the ballets Giselle and Raymonda. He was a guest soloist with the Australian Ballet, where he performed solo roles with Rudolf Nureyev and Margot Fonteyn. With Nureyev, Birkmeyer also danced in Béjart's choreography of Mahler's Lieder eines fahrenden Gesellen.

From 1985 to 2001, Birkmeyer was director of the Ballet Academy of the Vienna State Opera. From the 2001/2002 season until the end of the 2008/2009 season, Birkmeyer was artistic director and artistic director of the St. Pölten Festival Theatre Sein Nachfolger wurde Joachim Schlömer.

After completing his dancing career, Birkmeyer worked as a presenter at the Austrian Television, where he presented various musical entertainment shows for several years. With Lore Krainer, he hosted the broadcast series Das gab's nur einmal. In 1988, he also took on the role of the choreographer Zack in the musical A Chorus Line at Vienna Raimundtheater. He also appeared several times as a dancer in the ARD television show Einer wird gewinnen, for example in 1979 in Oberlaa and 1981 in Vienna.

Birkmeyer is married and father of two children.

== Awards ==
He was appointed Professor by the Republic of Austria. He was awarded the Austrian Decoration for Science and Art and the Decoration of Honour for Services to the Republic of Austria.

In January 2014, Birkmeyer received the Ehrenzeichen für Verdienste um das Bundesland Niederösterreich.
