= Roza =

Roza may refer to:

== People ==
=== First name ===
- Roza Abitova (born 2003), Kazakh rhythmic gymnast
- Roza Anagnosti (born 1943) Albanian actress
- Roza Baglanova (1922–2011), Soviet/Kazakh opera and pop music singer
- Roza Chumakova (1924–2007), Russian rower who won two European titles in the single sculls in 1954 and 1955
- Roza Eldarova (1923–2021), Soviet/Russian writer and politician
- Roza Eskenazi (1895–1980), Jewish-Greek singer
- Roza Güclü Hedin (born 1982), Swedish politician
- Roza Jalilova (1929–2025), Azerbaijani dancer
- Roza Makagonova (1927–1995), Soviet actress
- Roza Miletić (1934–2021), veteran of the Croatian War of Independence
- Roza Montazemi (1920–2009), Iranian author of cookbooks
- Roza Otunbayeva (born 1950), Kyrgyz diplomat and politician
- Roza Pomerantz-Meltzer (1880–1934), member of the Parliament of Poland in 1922
- Roza Popova (1879–1949), Bulgarian actress and theatre director
- Roza Robota (1921–1945), Jewish Polish participant in the Sonderkommando revolt
- Roza Rymbayeva (born 1957), Soviet/Kazakh singer
- Roza Sage (born 1957), Australian politician
- Roza Salih (born 1989), Scottish-Kurdish politician
- Roza Shanina (1924–1945), Soviet sniper
- Roža Piščanec (1923–2006), Slovene painter
- Róza Csillag (1832–1892), Austro-Hungarian opera singer

=== Surname ===
- Fernando Luiz Roza (born 1985), Brazilian soccer player
- Lita Roza (1926–2008), British singer

=== Nickname ===
- Andrej Rozman (born 1955), a.k.a. Roza, Slovene writer and actor
- Roza Terenzi, alias of Australian musician Katie Campbell

== Places ==
- Railway Settlement Roza, a town in India
- Roza, Russia, several inhabited localities in Russia

== Other ==
- ROZA, a political party in Greece
- Roza Dam, a diversion dam on the Yakima River in Washington state, United States
- Roza (musical), a 1987 musical based on the novel La Vie Devant Soi by Romain Gary
- Roza, an alternative form for sawm, a type of fasting regulated by Islamic jurisprudence
- Roza, a fictional character in the 2019 Indian animated series Chacha Chaudhary

== See also ==
- Roza Bal, a Muslim shrine in the Khanyaar, Srinagar, Jammu and Kashmir, India
- Róża (disambiguation)
- Rauza, a Perso-Arabic term used in Middle-East and Indian Subcontinent which means shrine or tomb
- Rózsa
- Rowzeh-khani, an Iranian ritual
