= Róża =

Róża is the Polish variant of the name Rose. It may refer to:

== People ==
- Róża Berger (1889–1945), only verified victim of the 1945 Kraków pogrom
- Róża Czacka (1876–1961), Polish venerated religious sister
- Róża Data (born 1955), Polish Olympic rower
- Róża Maria Goździewska (1936–1989), Polish nurse who assisted at the 1944 Warsaw uprising
- Róża Herman (1902–1995), Polish chess player
- Róża Kasprzak (born 1982), Polish pole vaulter
- Róża Kajzer (1909–1977), Polish Olympic swimmer
- Róża Kozakowska (born 1989), Polish Paralympic athlete
- Róza Laborfalvi (1817–1886), Hungarian actress
- Róża Etkin-Moszkowska (1908–1945), Polish pianist
- Róża Maria Wodzicka (1868–1902), Polish noblewoman
- Róża Thun (born 1954), Polish politician, European Parliament Member

== Places ==
- Róża, Łódź Voivodeship (central Poland)
- Róża, Lublin Voivodeship (east Poland)
- Róża, Podkarpackie Voivodeship (south-east Poland)
- Róża, Nowy Tomyśl County in Greater Poland Voivodeship (west-central Poland)
- Róża, Słupca County in Greater Poland Voivodeship (west-central Poland)
- Róża, Warmian-Masurian Voivodeship (north Poland)

== Film ==
- Róża (1936 film), a 1936 Polish film
- Róża (2011 film), a 2011 Polish film

== See also ==
- Roza (disambiguation)
- Rózsa
