= Rosa Streitmann =

Austrian opera singer

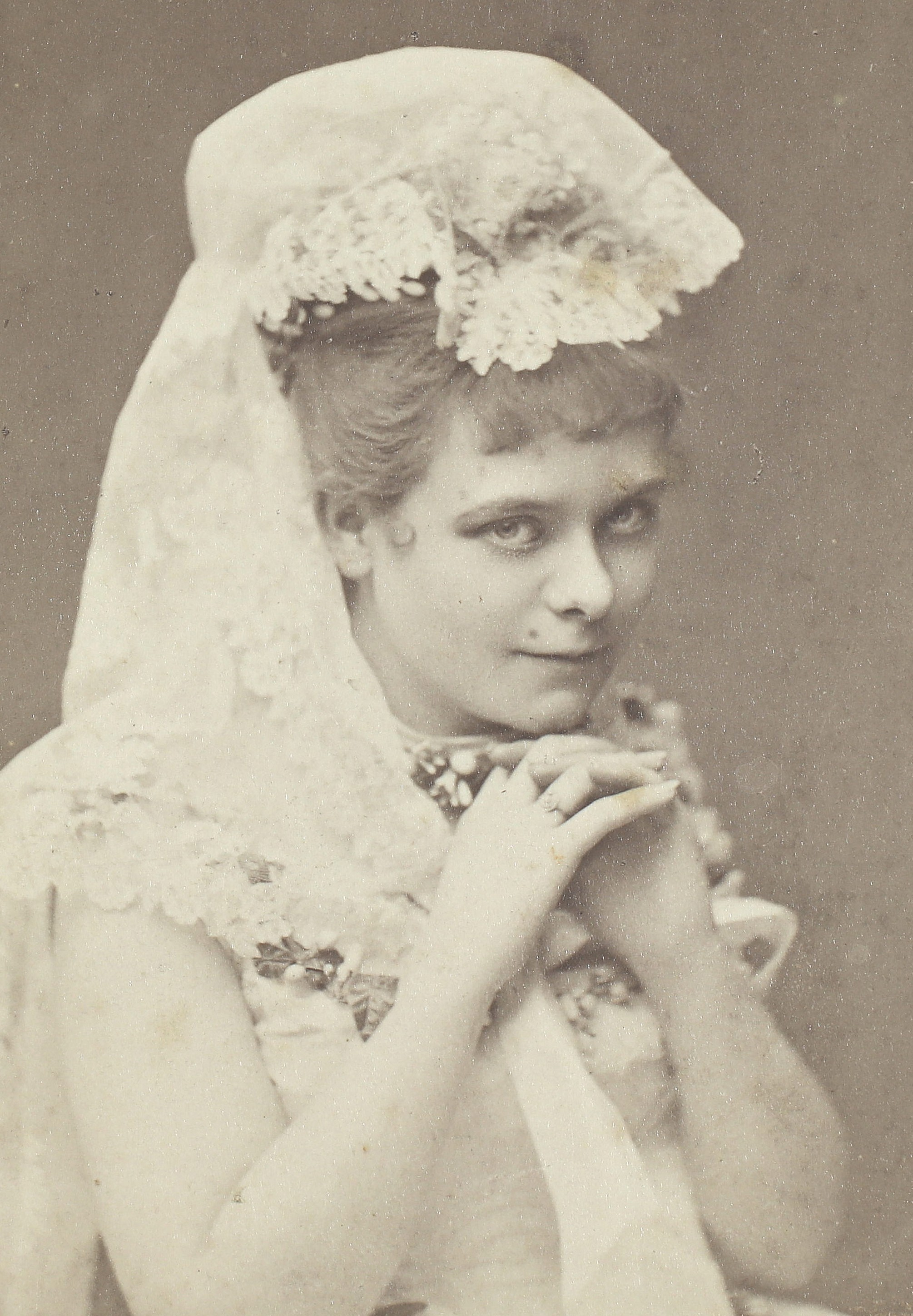
- Photograph by Rudolf Krziwanek, c. 1876
- Born: Rosalia Streitmann; February 21, 1857; Vienna, Austrian Empire
- Died: July 30, 1937 (aged 80); Vienna, Austria
- Relatives: Rosa Csillag (aunt); Karl Streitmann (brother); Louise Übermasser (sister-in-law)

Rosa Carola Streitmann, von Jenny from 1885 and Benvenisti from 1888 (21 February 1857 – 30 July 1937) was an Austrian operetta singer and singing pedagogue.

== Life ==
Born in Vienna as Rosalia Streitmann, Streitmann was the daughter of a stockbroker, her brother was the operetta singer Karl Streitmann. She is said to have first enjoyed ballet training with Virgilius Calori, but then turned to singing under pressure from her parents. She received lessons from her aunt Rosa Csillag. A first public performance is mentioned in the press in February 1875. In June 1876 she made her debut at the Carltheater in Offenbach's Schönröschen at the world premiere of Franz von Suppé's Boccaccio she sang the role of Fiametta. In 1881 she changed to the Theater an der Wien.

In December 1885 Streitmann married Fritz von Jenny, a grandson of Franz von Suppé. However, shortly after the marriage, he lived together with Streitmann's sister-in-law Louise. The resulting scandal led to several lawsuits.

After that Streitmann was briefly employed in Moscow (1886), at the Berliner Theater and at the Königsstädtisches Theater (1887). Her second marriage was to Heinrich Benvenisti from 1888 with the marriage ending in divorce in 1898.

Her engagement in the Theater in der Josefstadt, which she began in 1889, ended with mutual recriminations and a trial, from which Streitmann finally emerged victorious. From a stay abroad (possibly in Paris) she returned to Vienna in 1893, where she sang again at the Carlstheater in 1897. She made her last stage appearance in 1900 at the Operettenhaus in Hamburg.

At the latest since 1897 she worked as a singing teacher from 1905 for the Musikschulen Kaiser.

From 1920 Streitmann lived in poor conditions, first in the Gumpendorfer Straße, last in Baden bei Wien. Streitmann died in the Vienna General Hospital at age 80 and was buried at Wiener Zentralfriedhof on 2 August 1937.
