= Karl Streitmann =

Austrian opera singer

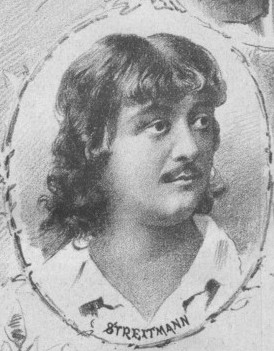
Karl Streitmann (1886)

Karl Streitmann (8 May 1853 – 29 October 1937) was an Austrian stage actor and operatic tenor.

== Life ==
Born in Vienna, Streitmann is said to have started studying medicine, but then devoted himself to acting after receiving instruction from Joseph Lewinsky.

His debut took place in Bratislava (as Geßler, Gringoire, and Hamlet), then in Berlin (inaugural role of Franz Moor, 16 August 1878), Bydgoszcz, Toruń, and Sigmaringen. Afterwards, at the Carltheater in Vienna and in Prague at the Landestheater, where he sang José in Carmen and Tamino in The Magic Flute. In the world premiere of The Gypsy Baron he performed Barinkay and also took part in other operetta performances. He completed a tour of North America: from Southampton, he embarked on a ship to New York, where he made his debut as a gypsy baron on 22 September 1889. Stops in Chicago, Philadelphia, Pittsburgh, Baltimore, Washington, etc., followed. He also learned English, so that he was able to perform with the prima donna Lillian Russell in Madison Square Garden on 26 October 1891.

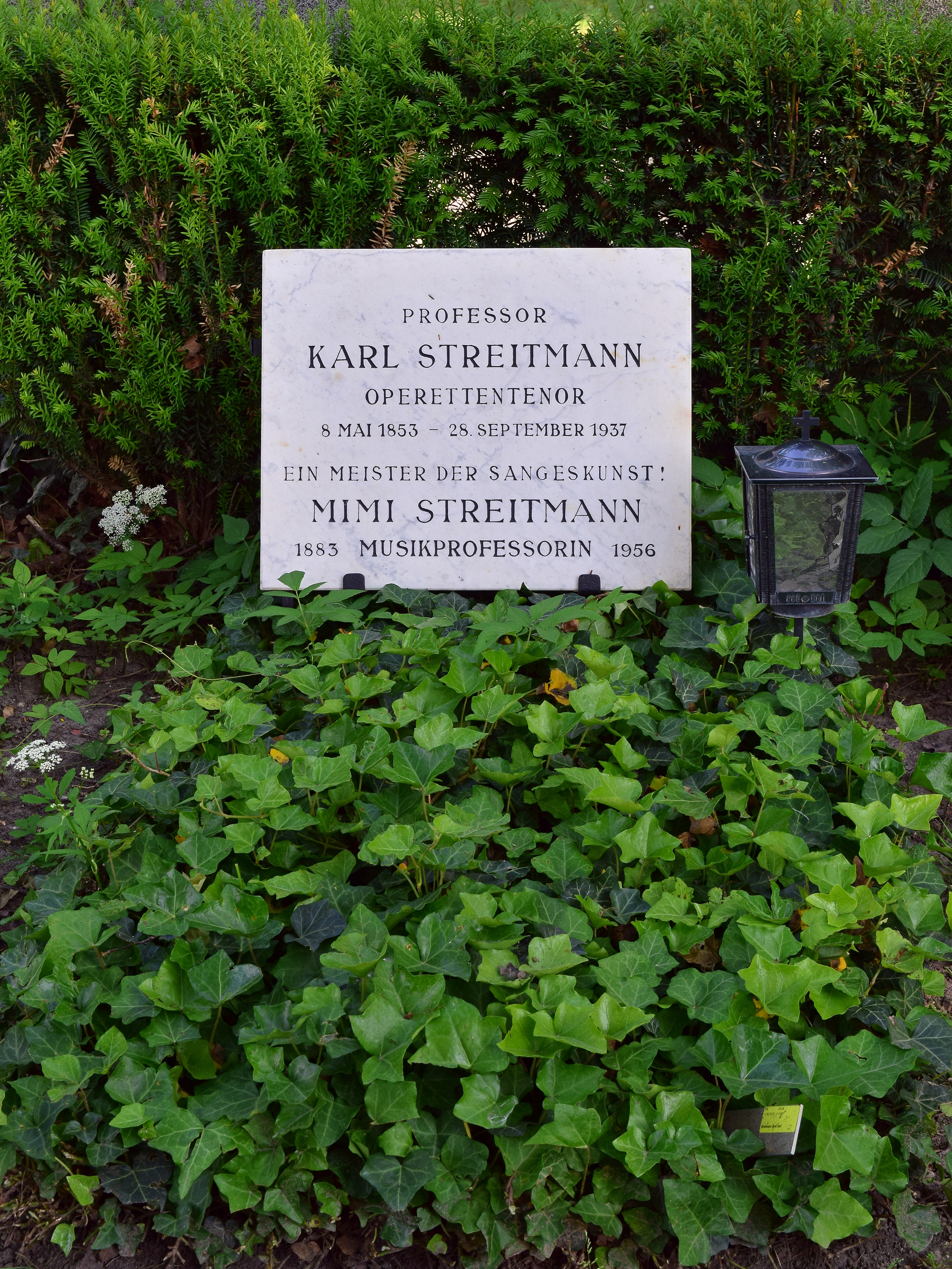
Honorary dedicated grave in the cemetery of the Feuerhalle Simmering

His further activities took place at the Friedrich-Wilhelmstädtisches Theater in Berlin from 1901 to 1902, again at the Carltheater in Vienna from 1902 to 1905, and he made frequent guest appearances at the Staatsoper Unter den Linden in Berlin, the Hoftheater in Stuttgart, and in Amsterdam. In 1908 at the Theater an der Wein, he created the role of Alexius in Der tapfere Soldat (The Chocolate Soldier).

He died impoverished in Vienna. His dedicated grave of the city of Vienna is located in the urn grove of the Feuerhalle Simmering (division 6, ring 3, group 3, number 47). In 1955 the Streitmanngasse in Vienna-Hietzing was named after him.

Between 1882 and 1884 Streitmann was married with the actress Louise Übermasser as well as from 1904 with the singer Gisela Noë. His sister Rosa Streitmann was also an operatic soprano, and his aunt was Rosa Csillag.

== Filmography ==
- 1913: Johann Strauß an der schönen blauen Donau.
