= Rózsa =

- Gender: feminine
- Language: Hungarian

Origin
- Language: Latin
- Meaning: "rose"

Other names
- Nicknames: Rózsi, Rozi
- Anglicisation: Rose
- Related names: Róza, Rozália

Rózsa is a Hungarian language surname or female given name, which is equivalent to the English name Rose. The surname Rózsa is derived from the given name. Variants of the name include Rozsa, Rózsák, Rózsás, and Rozsas. The name may refer to:

== Given name ==
- Rózsa Csillag (1832–1892), Austro-Hungarian opera singer
- Rózsa Darázs (born 1987), Hungarian speed-skater
- Rózsa Hoffmann (born 1948), Hungarian politician
- Rózsa Péter (1905–1977), Hungarian mathematician

== Surname ==
- Dániel Rózsa (born 1984), Hungarian football player
- Eduardo Rózsa-Flores (1960–2009), Hungarian journalist
- Endre Rózsa (1941–1995), Hungarian poet
- János Rózsás (1926–2012), Hungarian writer
- Johnny Rozsa (born 1946), American photographer
- Miklós Rózsa (1907–1995), Hungarian composer
- Norbert Rózsa (born 1972), Hungarian swimmer
- Péter Rózsás (1943–2024), Hungarian table tennis player
- Sándor Rózsa (1813–1878), Hungarian outlaw
- Vera Rózsa (1917–2010), Hungarian singer

== See also ==
- Rose (disambiguation)
- Rosen
- Rózsavölgyi
