= Warsaw Rising Museum =

Polish museum about the Warsaw Uprising

Coordinates: 52°13′56″N 20°58′51″E

- Muzeum Powstania Warszawskiego

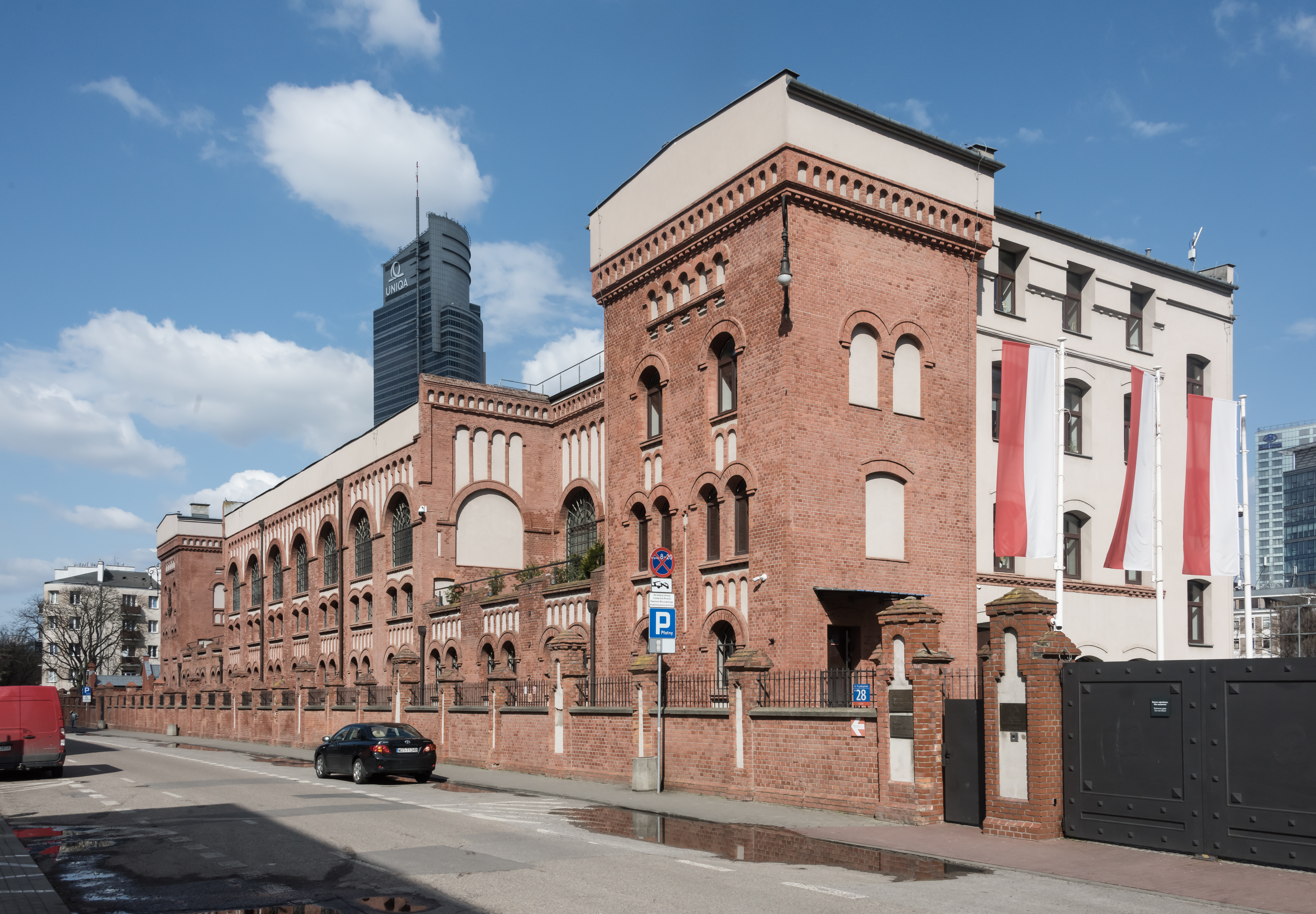
- Museum building
- Established: February 10, 1983 (opened July 31, 2004)
- Location: Wola, Warsaw, Poland
- Visitors: 416,000 (2007)
- Director: Jan Ołdakowski
- Public transit access: Rondo Daszynskiego
- Website: Official website

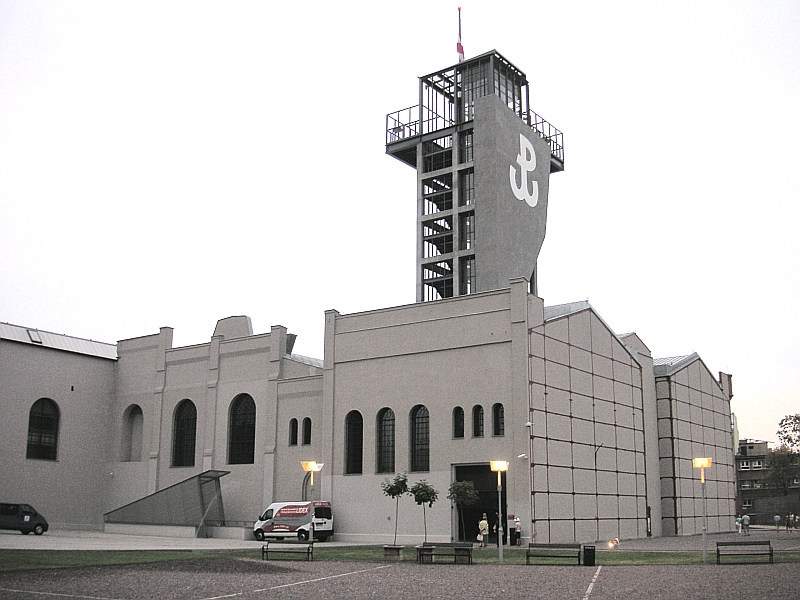
Museum building from the eastern side

Museum logo

The Warsaw Rising Museum (Polish: Muzeum Powstania Warszawskiego), in the Wola district of Warsaw, Poland, is dedicated to the Warsaw Uprising of 1944. The institution of the museum was established in 1983, but no construction work took place for many years. It opened on July 31, 2004, marking the 60th anniversary of the uprising.

The museum sponsors research into the history of the uprising, and the history and possessions of the Polish Underground State. It collects and maintains hundreds of artifacts – ranging from weapons used by the insurgents to love letters – to present a full picture of the people involved. The museum's stated goals include the creation of an archive of historical information on the uprising and the recording of the stories and memories of living participants. Its director is Jan Ołdakowski, with historian Dariusz Gawin from the Polish Academy of Sciences as his deputy.

The museum is a member organisation of the Platform of European Memory and Conscience.

== Exhibitions ==
The museum covers all aspects of the Warsaw Uprising.

There are exhibits over several floors, containing photographs, audio and video, interactive displays, artifacts, written accounts, and other testimonies of how life was during the German occupation of Warsaw, the uprising, and its aftermath. There are displays dedicated to each district of Warsaw. There are many free informative leaflets and flyers (in Polish and English), including 63 calendar pages covering the dates from 1 August 1944 to 2 October 1944 – each containing a summary of the most important events that took place on that particular day of the uprising.

Some of the many sections and exhibits include:

- The "little insurgent" room: dedicated to the youngest insurgents and children's experience of the uprising. The room includes a replica of the "little insurgent" monument and a colourised photograph of Róża Maria Goździewska, a girl who was known as "the little nurse".
- Kino palladium: a small cinema showing a continuous stream of original footage taken by insurgent filmographers in 1944, which was used to produce newsreels that were shown in Warsaw's Palladium cinema during the uprising.
- Sewer replicas: one on the mezzanine floor and another in the basement – a chance to experience the practice of using the sewers to move through German-held territory (without the sewage).
- Insurgent hospital: help for the wounded during the uprising.
- Hangar: a hall containing a full-size B-24 Liberator.
- Large cinema: on the ground floor, it presents a film reconstructed of newsreels. It concludes with Chopin's Prelude in D Minor, Op. 28 no. 24.
- Observation tower: panoramic views of Warsaw from the top of the building.
- Print shop: a room containing original typewriters and printing equipment used for producing underground newspapers during the German occupation.
- City of Ruins: a short 3D movie of the ruins of Warsaw taken from the air in 1945.
- Nazi section: the horrors of the German occupation and the atrocities committed by the Germans and their collaborators during the uprising.
- Communist section: the Soviet takeover of Poland, Stalin's puppet government, lack of help for the uprising, and the fate of the Polish resistance in post-war communist Poland.

== Other highlights ==
- A 1940s style cafe
- Freedom park: over 30 posters featuring colourised photographs taken during the uprising
- Freedom park: a replica of the Kubuś armoured car, manufactured by the insurgents of the Powiśle district of Warsaw during the uprising
- Freedom park: remnants of a statue of Józef Poniatowski that was blown up by the Germans after the uprising
- Freedom park: street art inspired by the Warsaw Uprising
- A memorial wall with thousands of names of the fallen and the "Monter bell"
- A wall, known as the heart of the museum, with sounds of battle and heartbeats emanating from it
- Souvenir shops (one inside the museum and one in the ticket office)
- The Warsaw Fotoplastikon, a 1905 stereoscopic theatre used by the Polish underground, now preserved and operated by the Warsaw Uprising Museum as an off-site branch at 51 Jerusalem Avenue

== Gallery ==
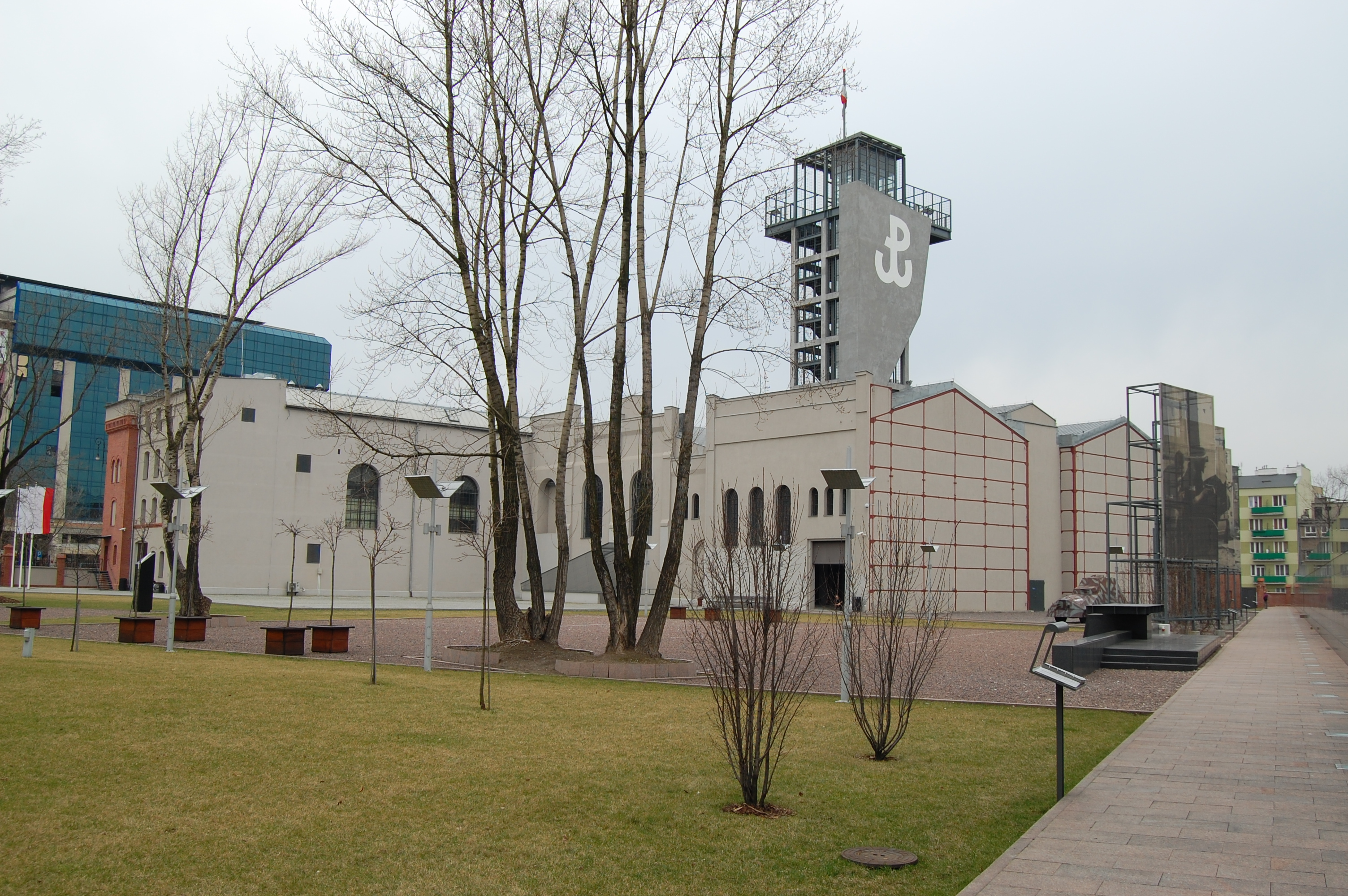
Warsaw Rising Museum

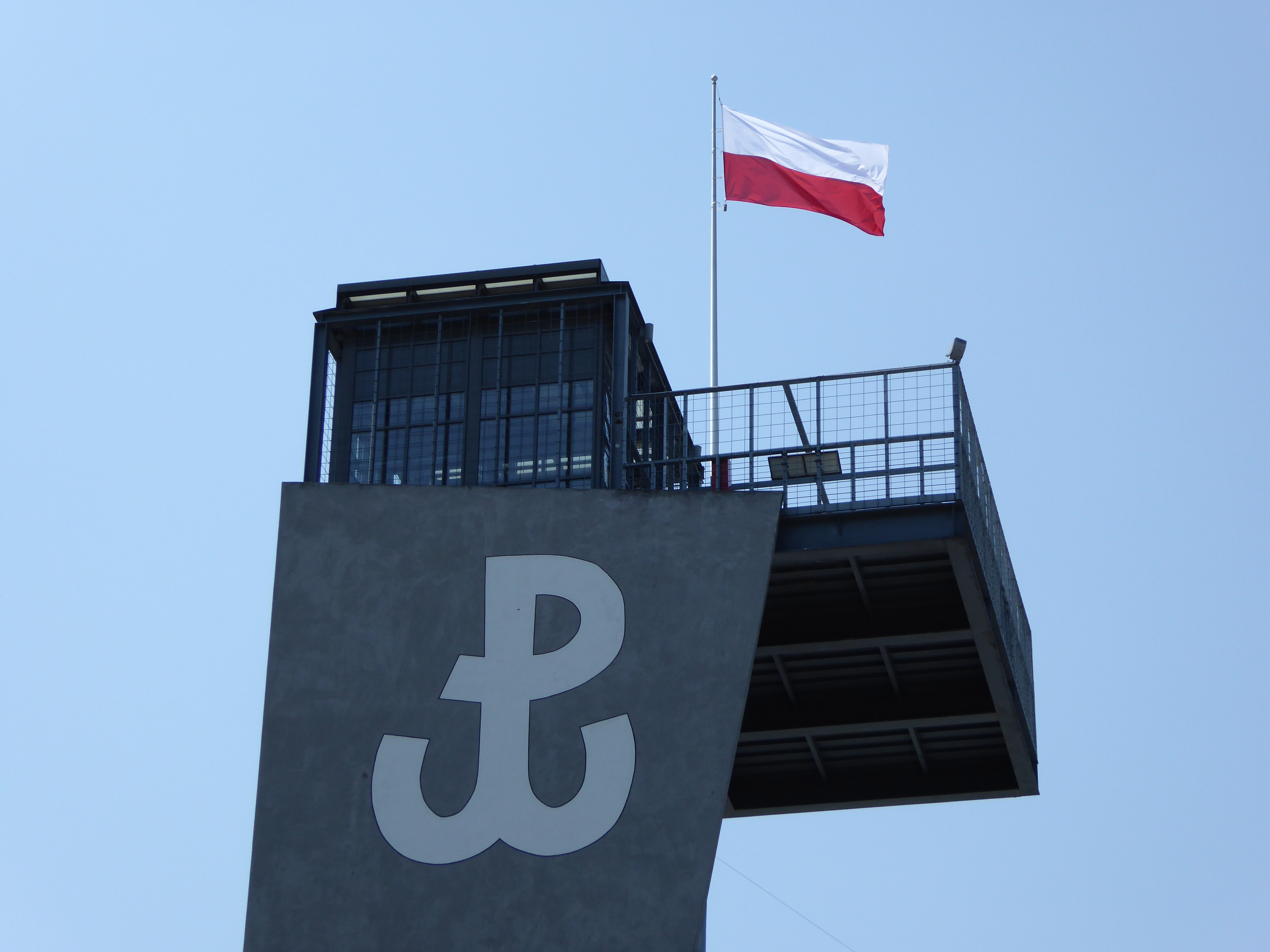
Observation tower

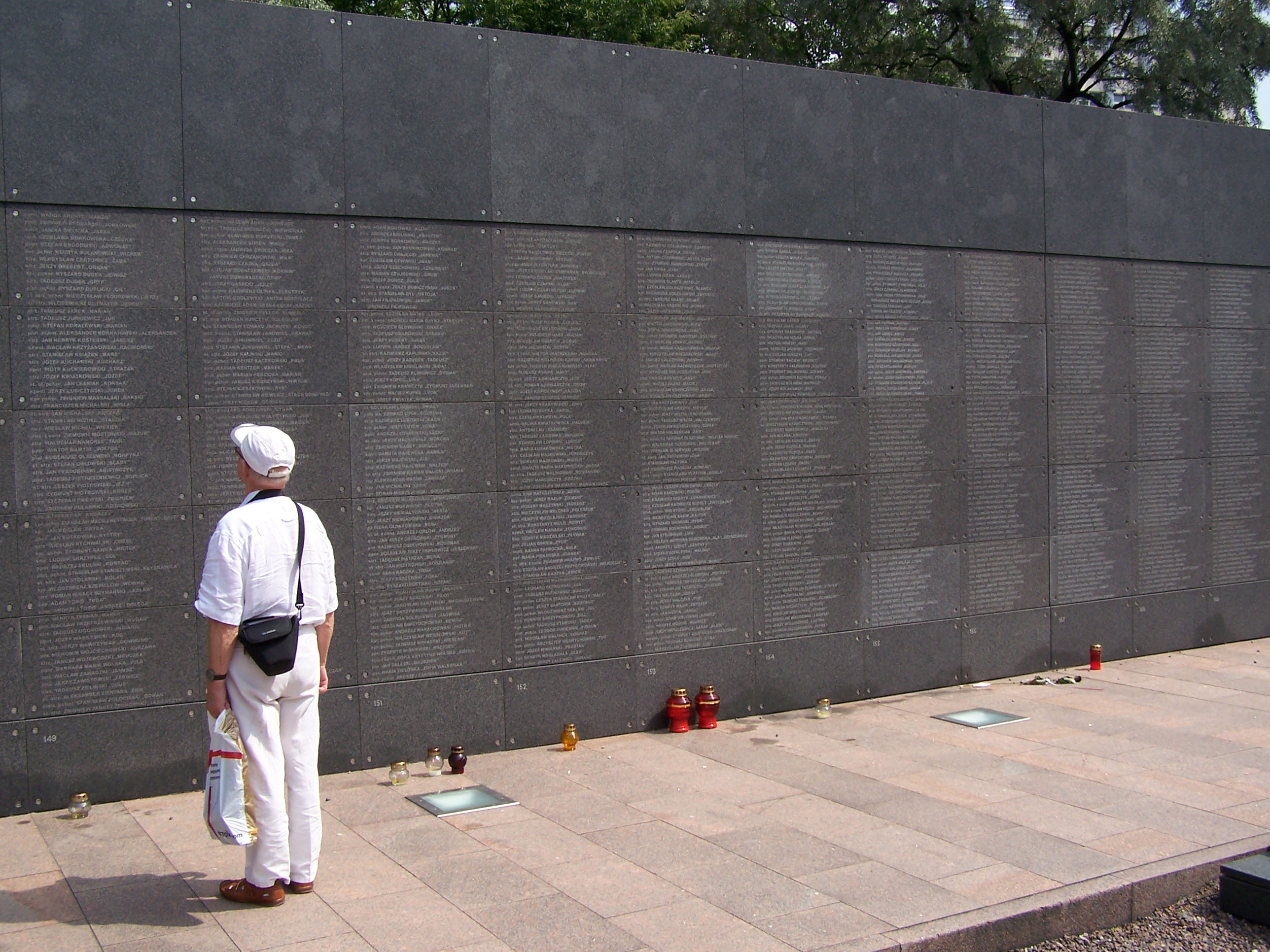
Memorial wall

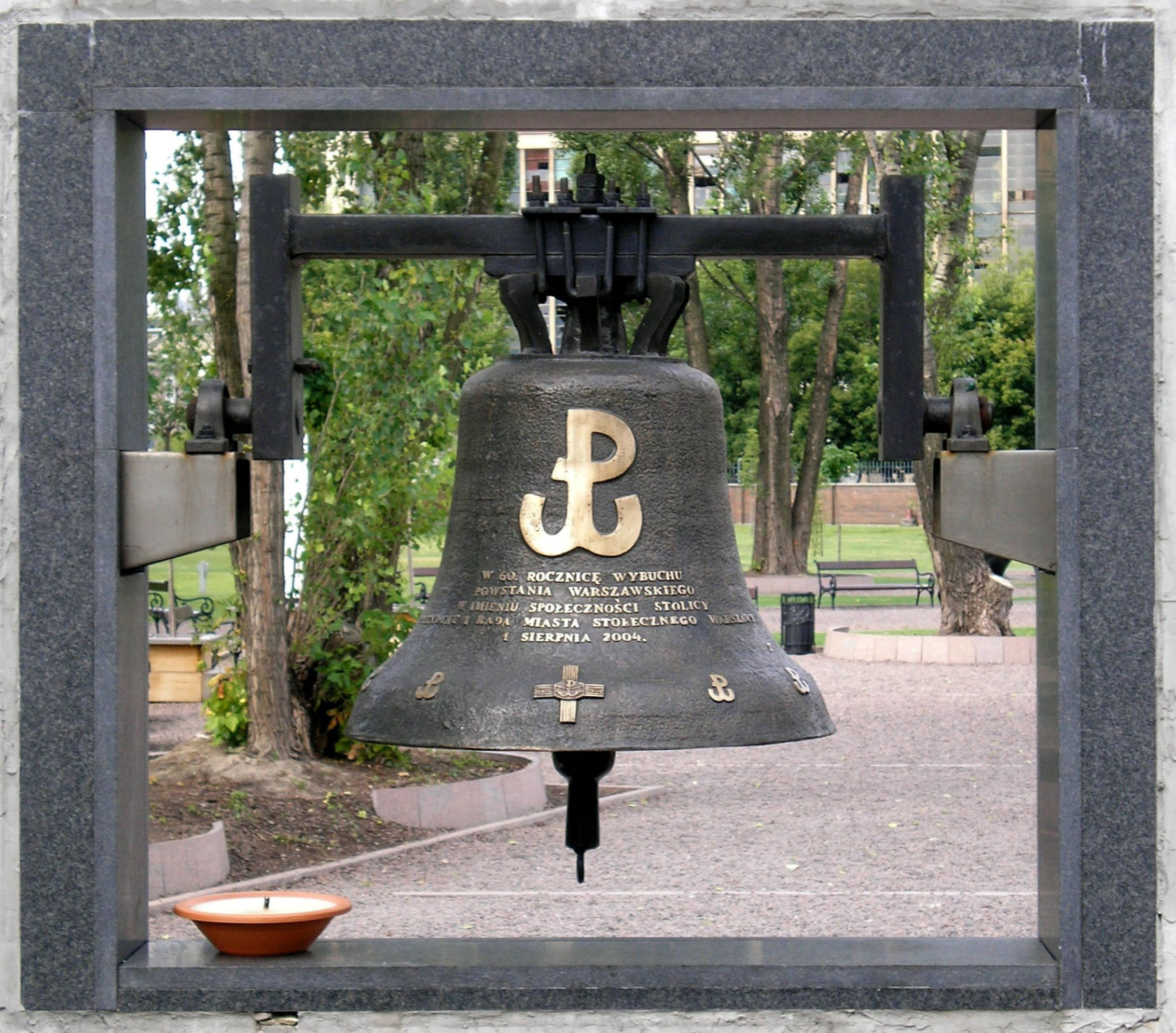
Monter bell

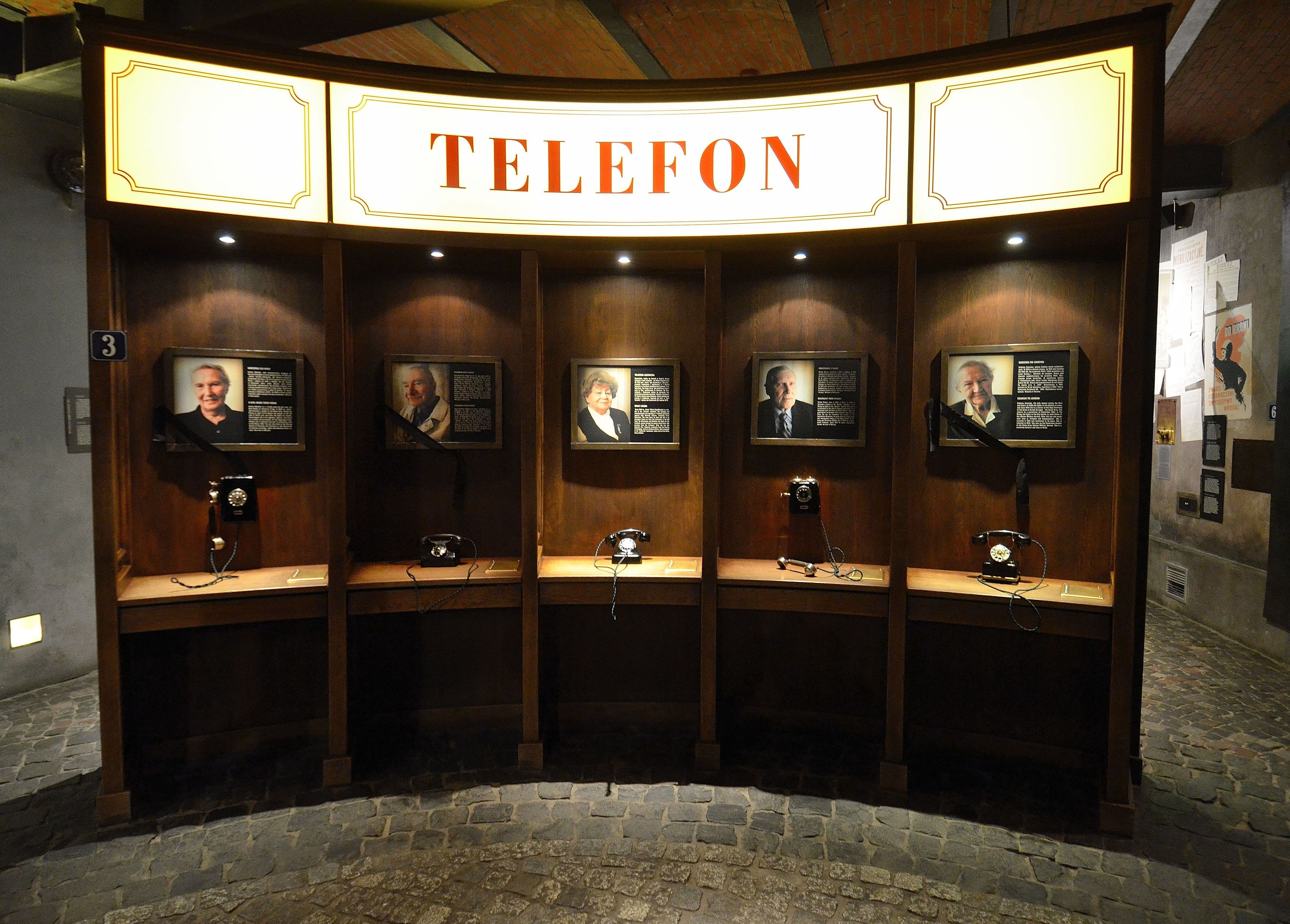
Listen to "phone calls" from insurgents

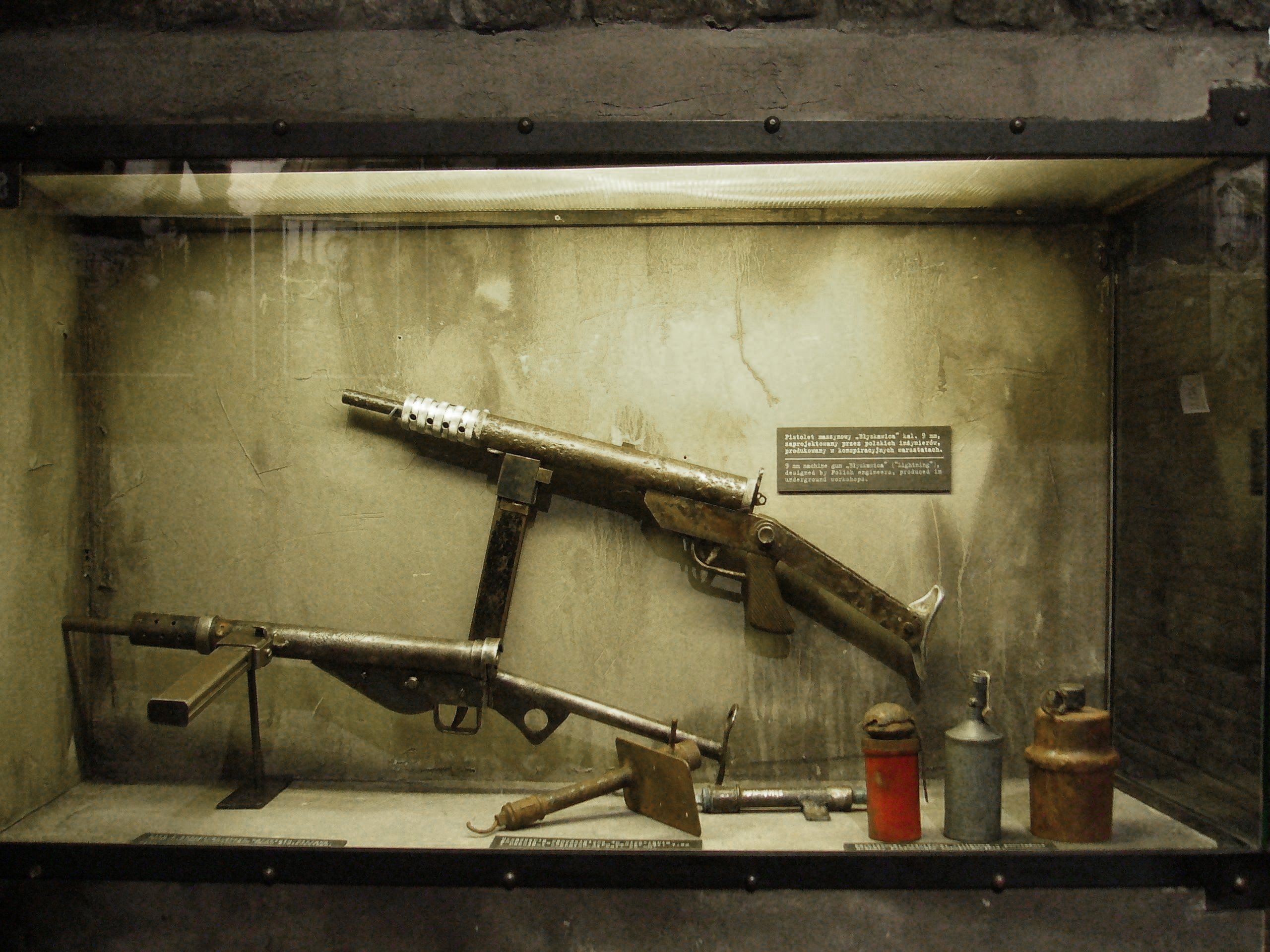
Sten and Błyskawica submachine guns

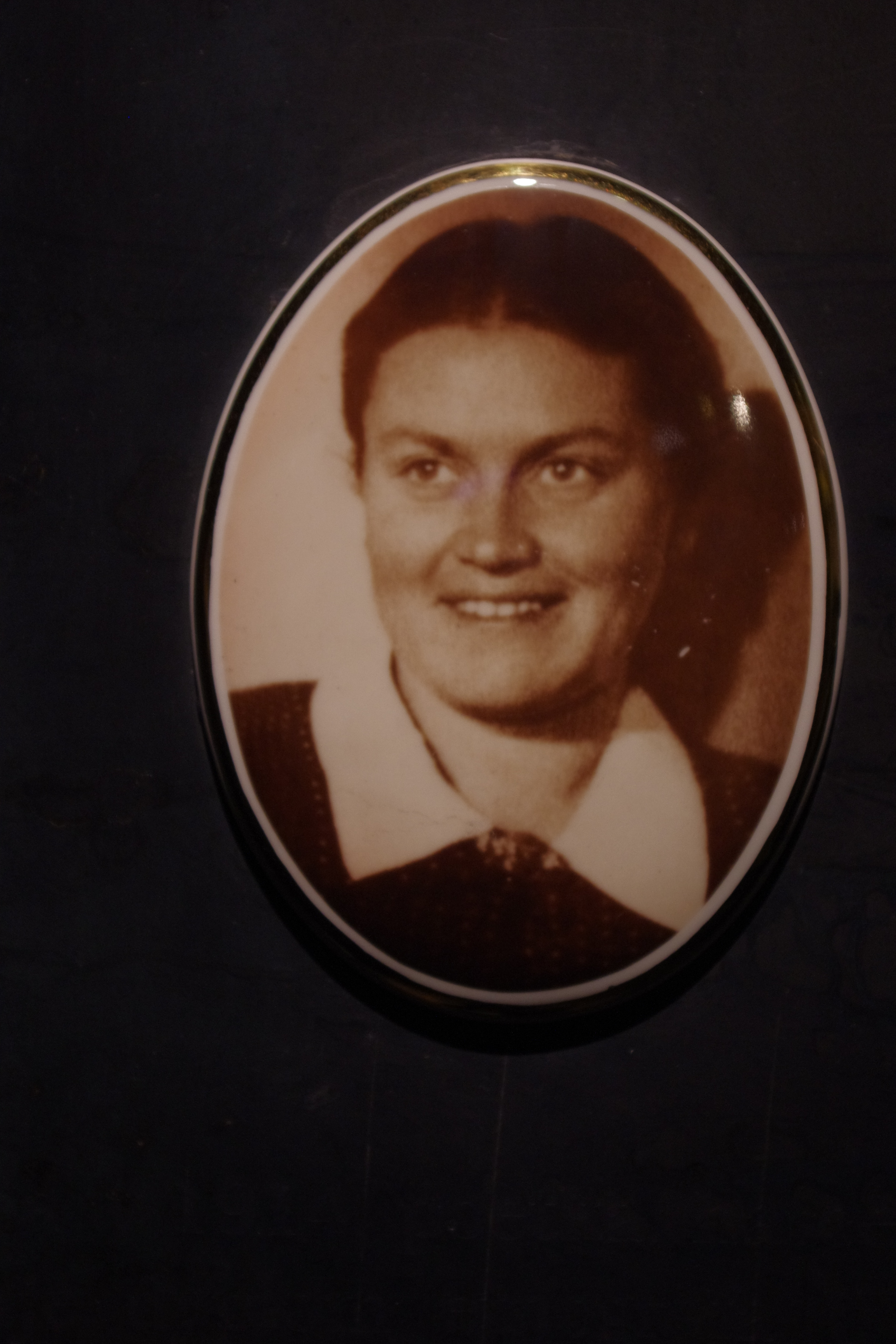
Krystyna Krahelska exhibit

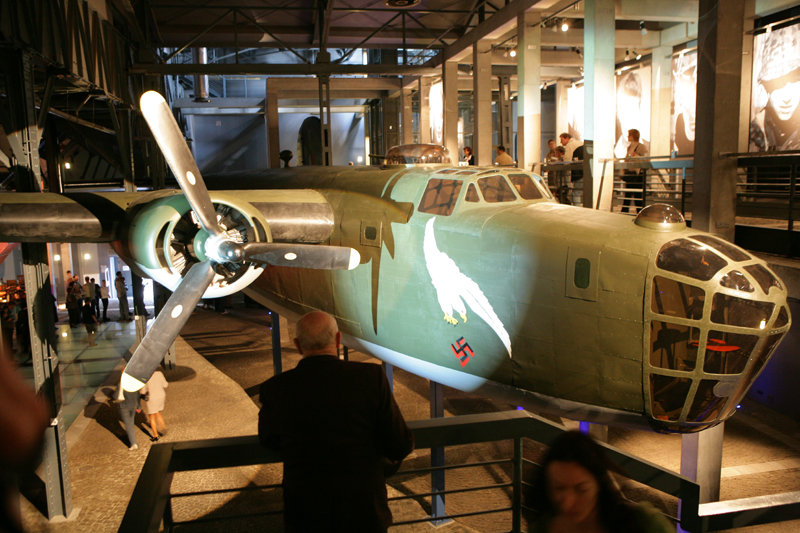
Replica of a B-24 Liberator

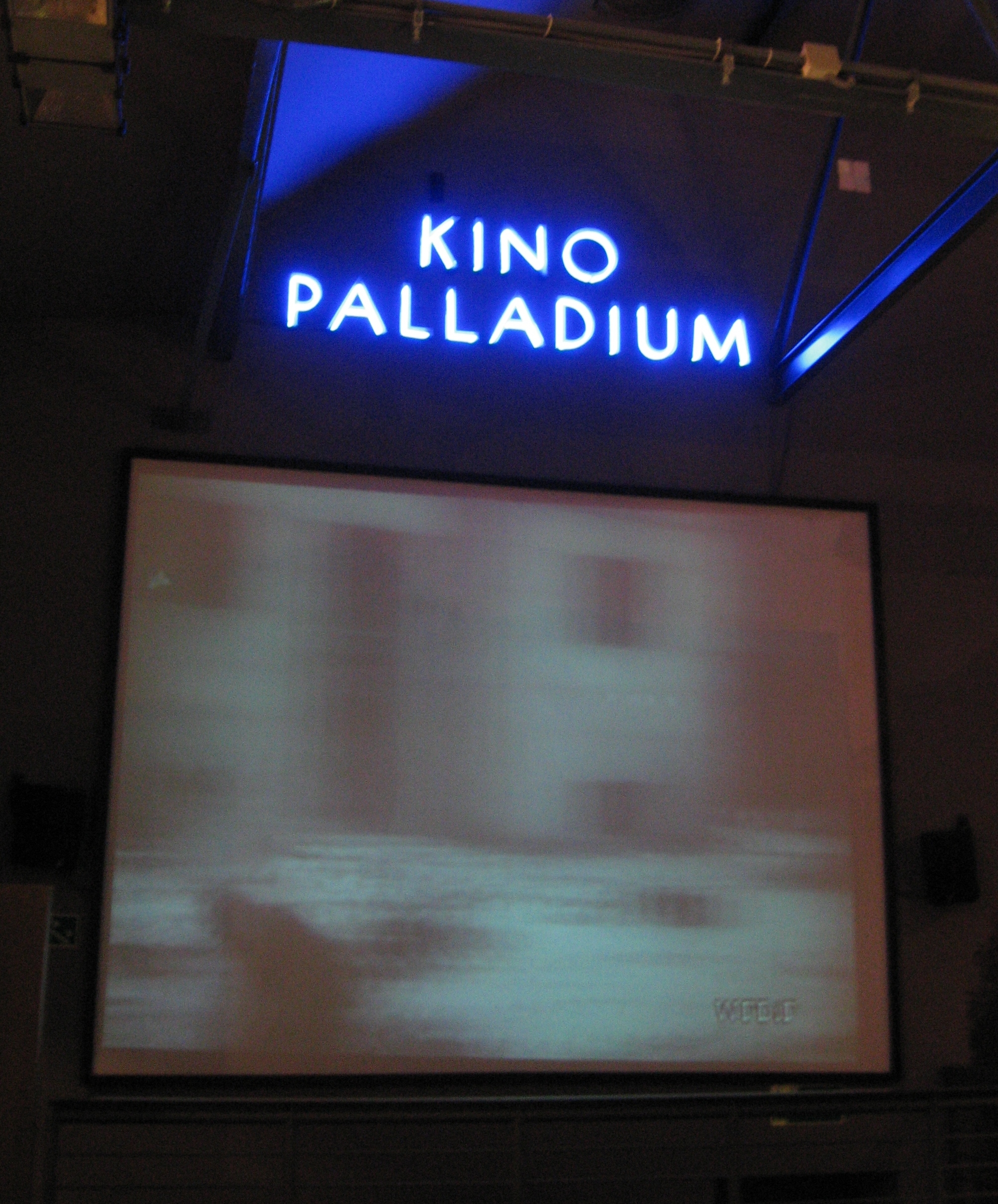
Palladium cinema

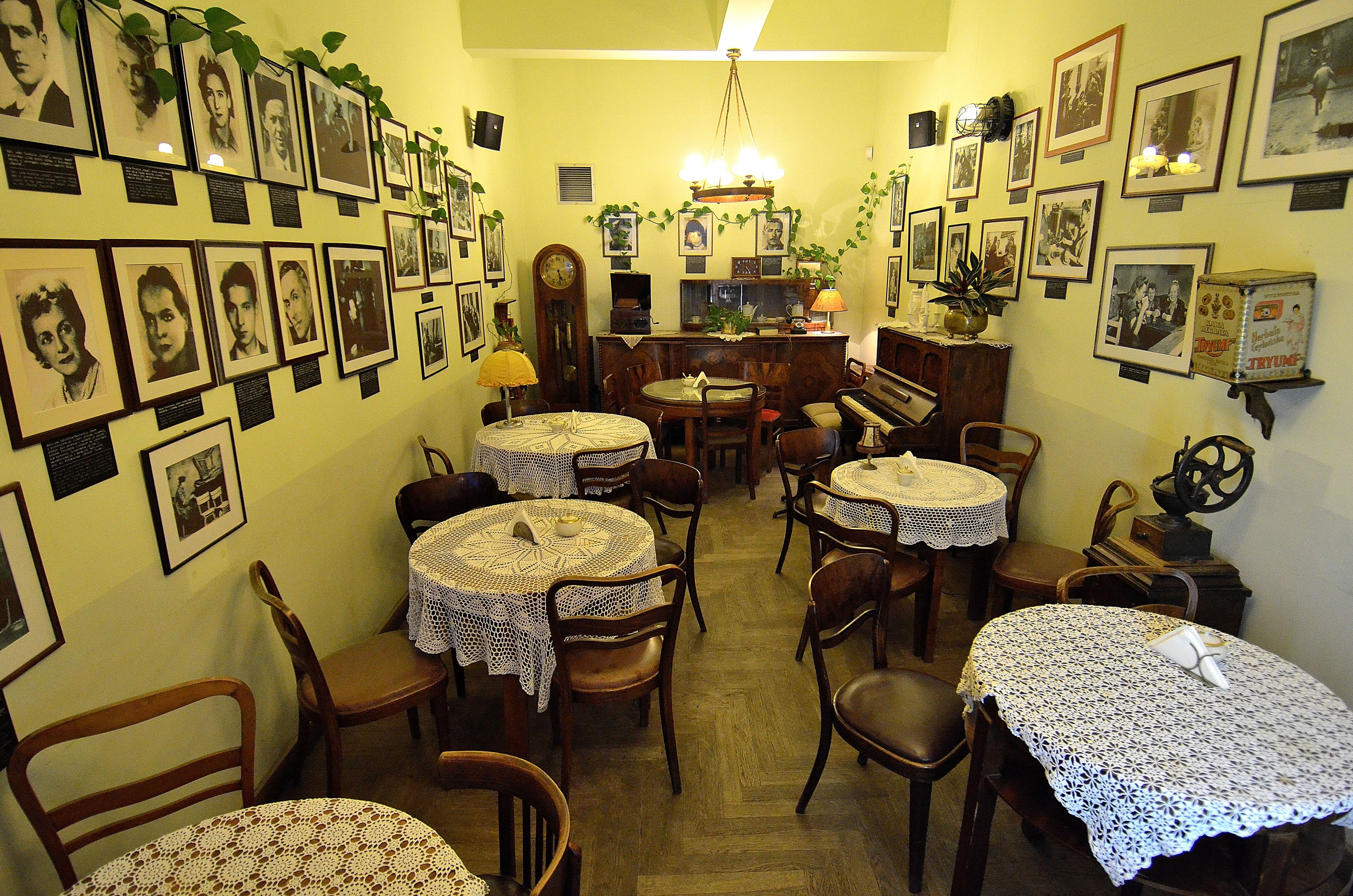
1940s style cafe

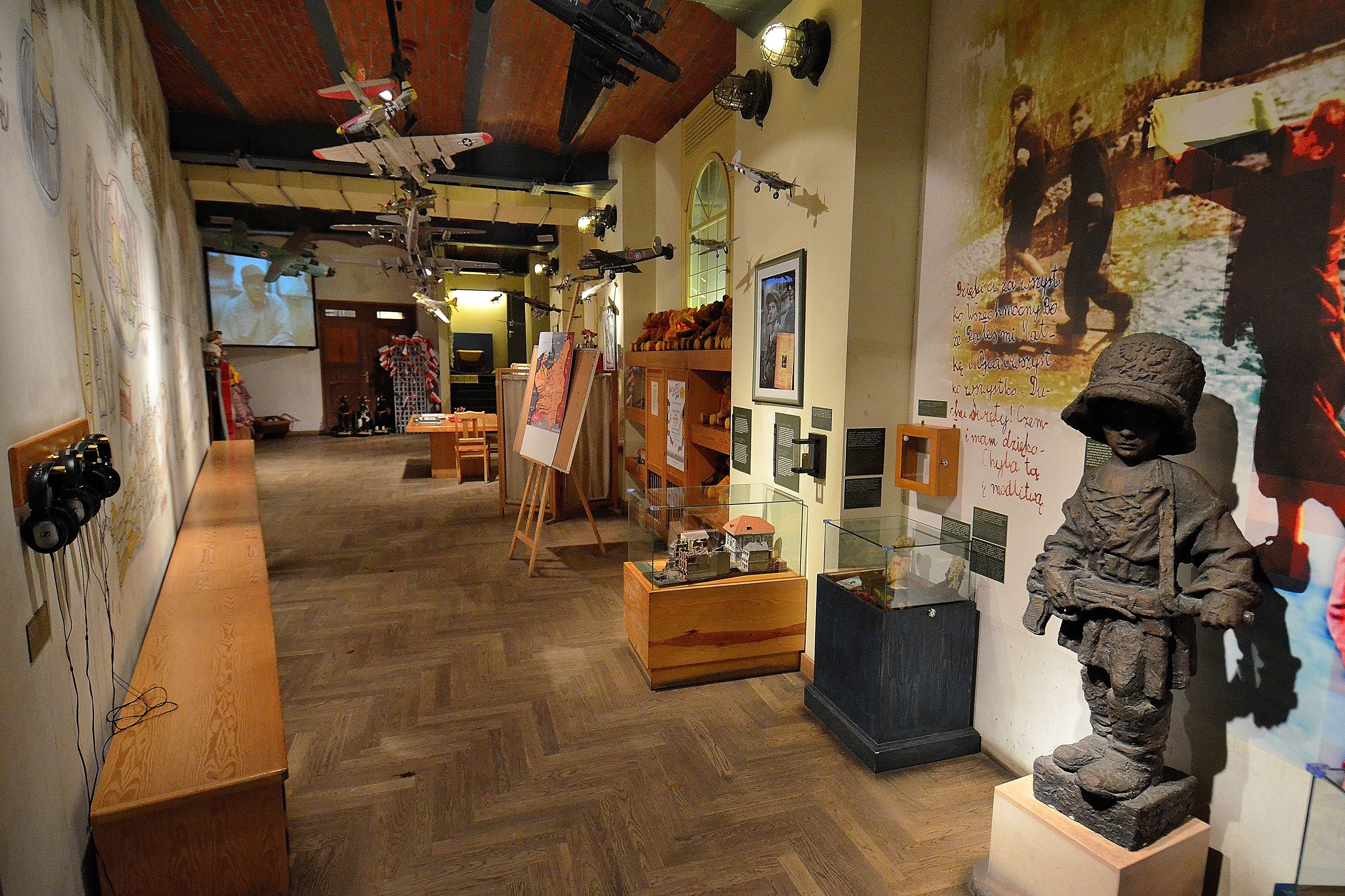
Little insurgent room

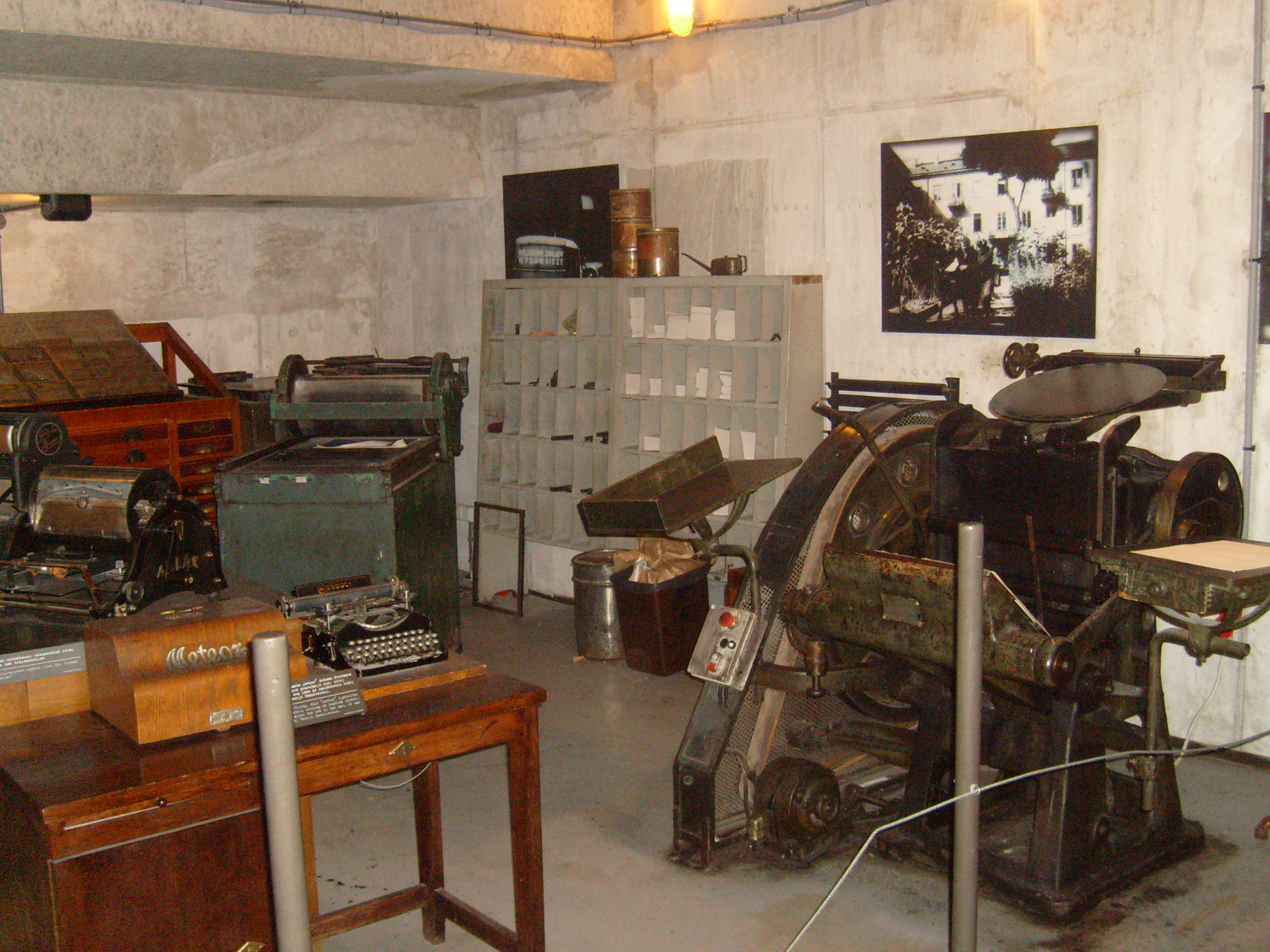
Print shop

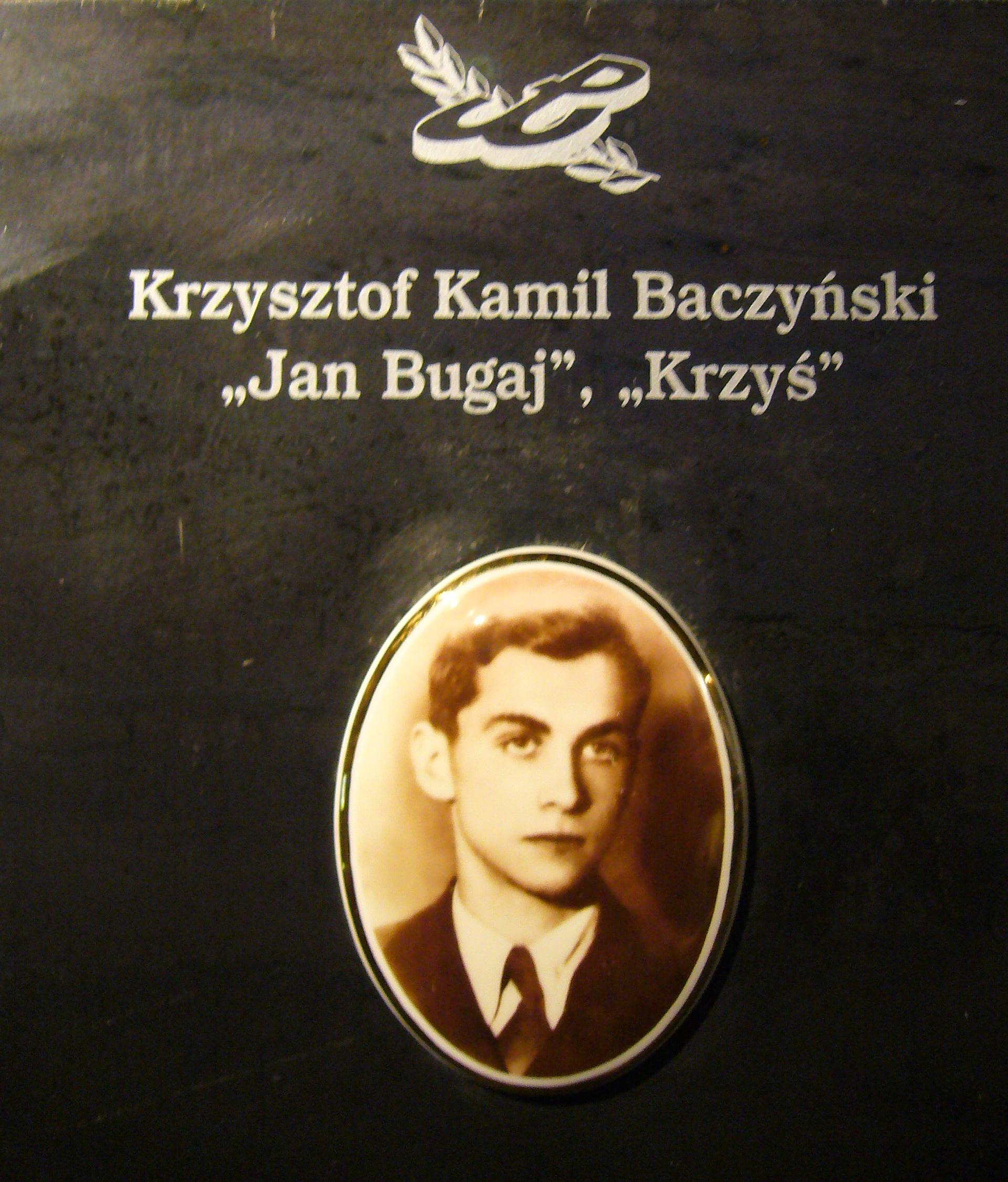
Krzysztof Kamil Baczyński exhibit

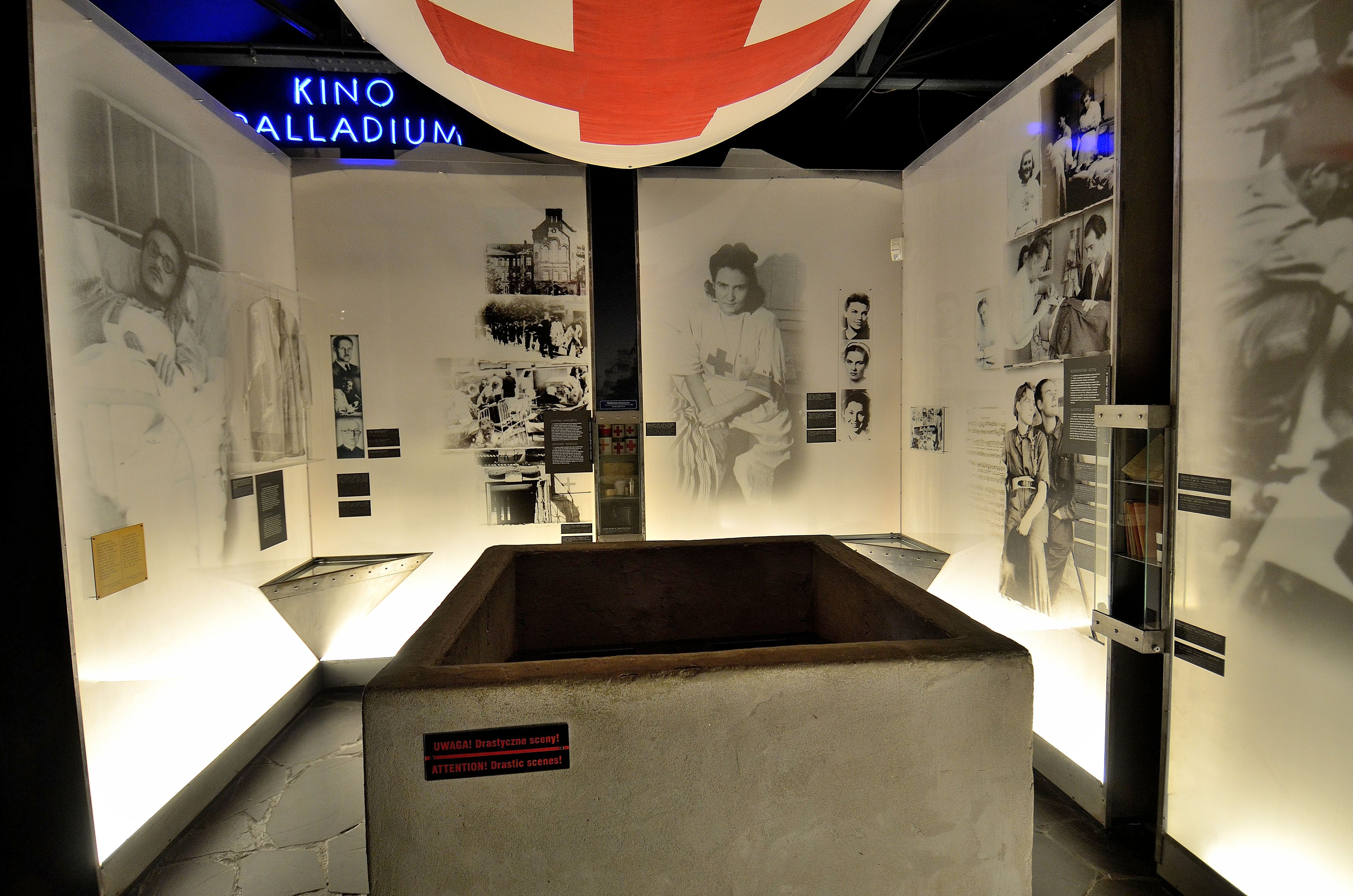
Insurgent hospital

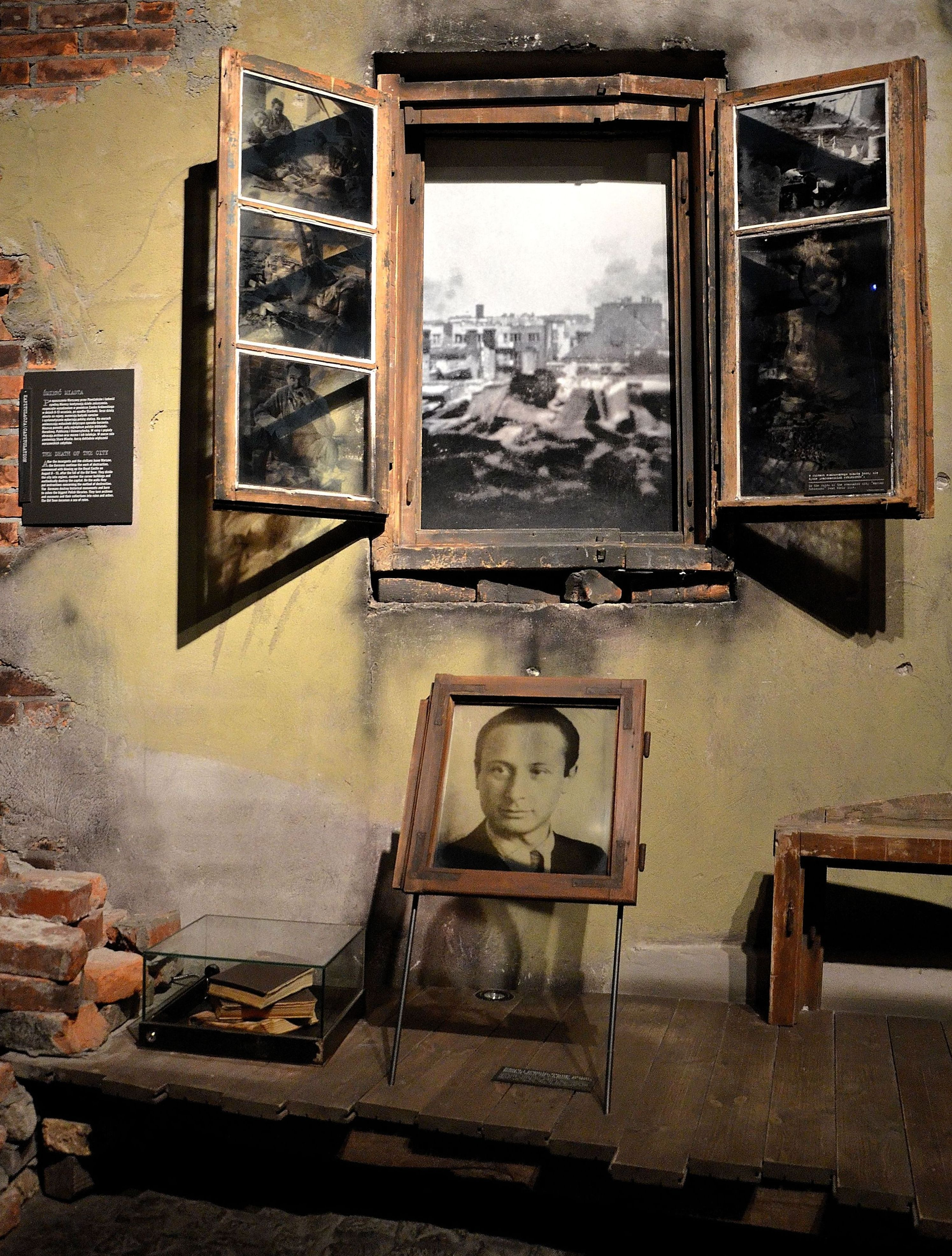
Władysław Szpilman exhibit

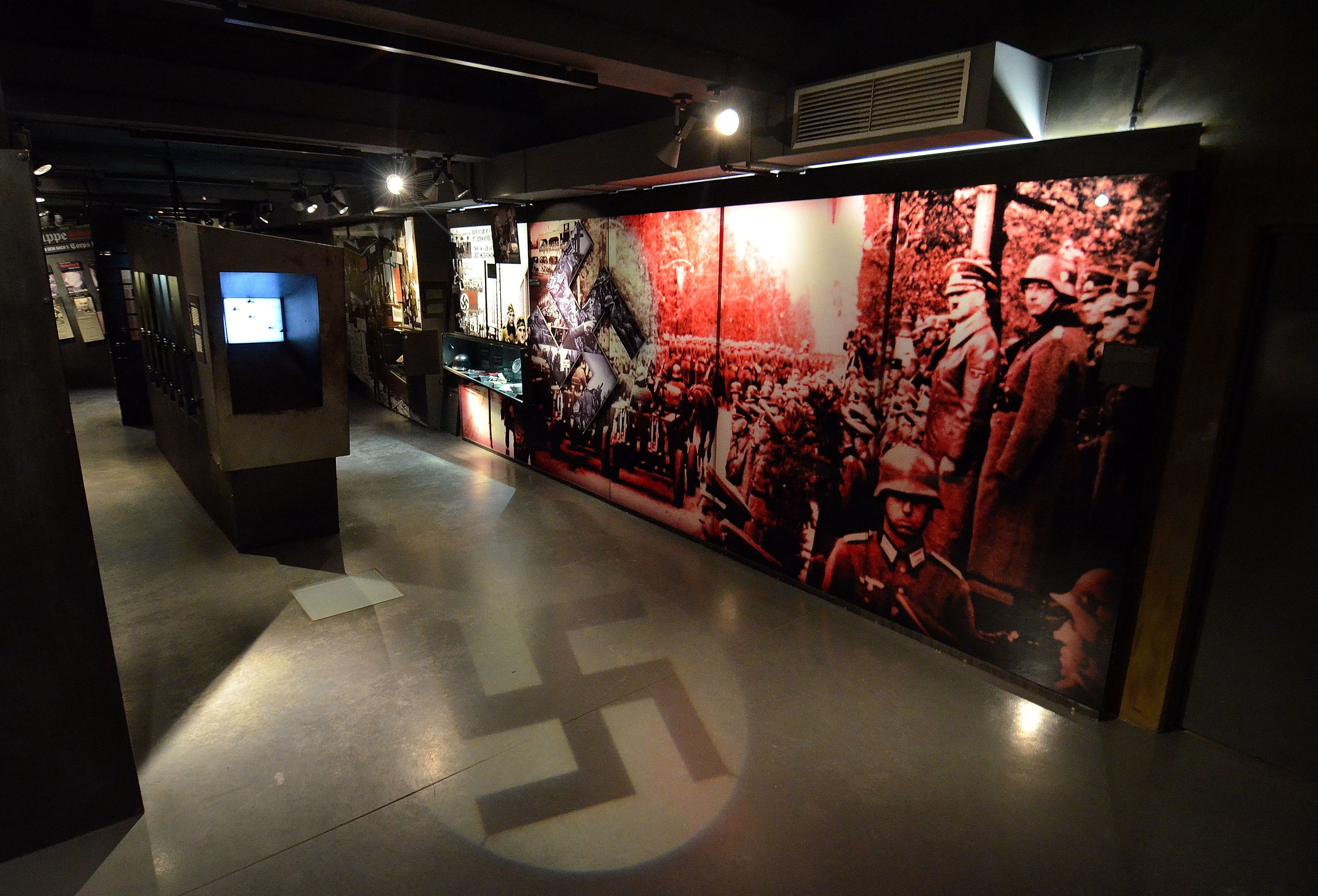
Germans in occupied Warsaw

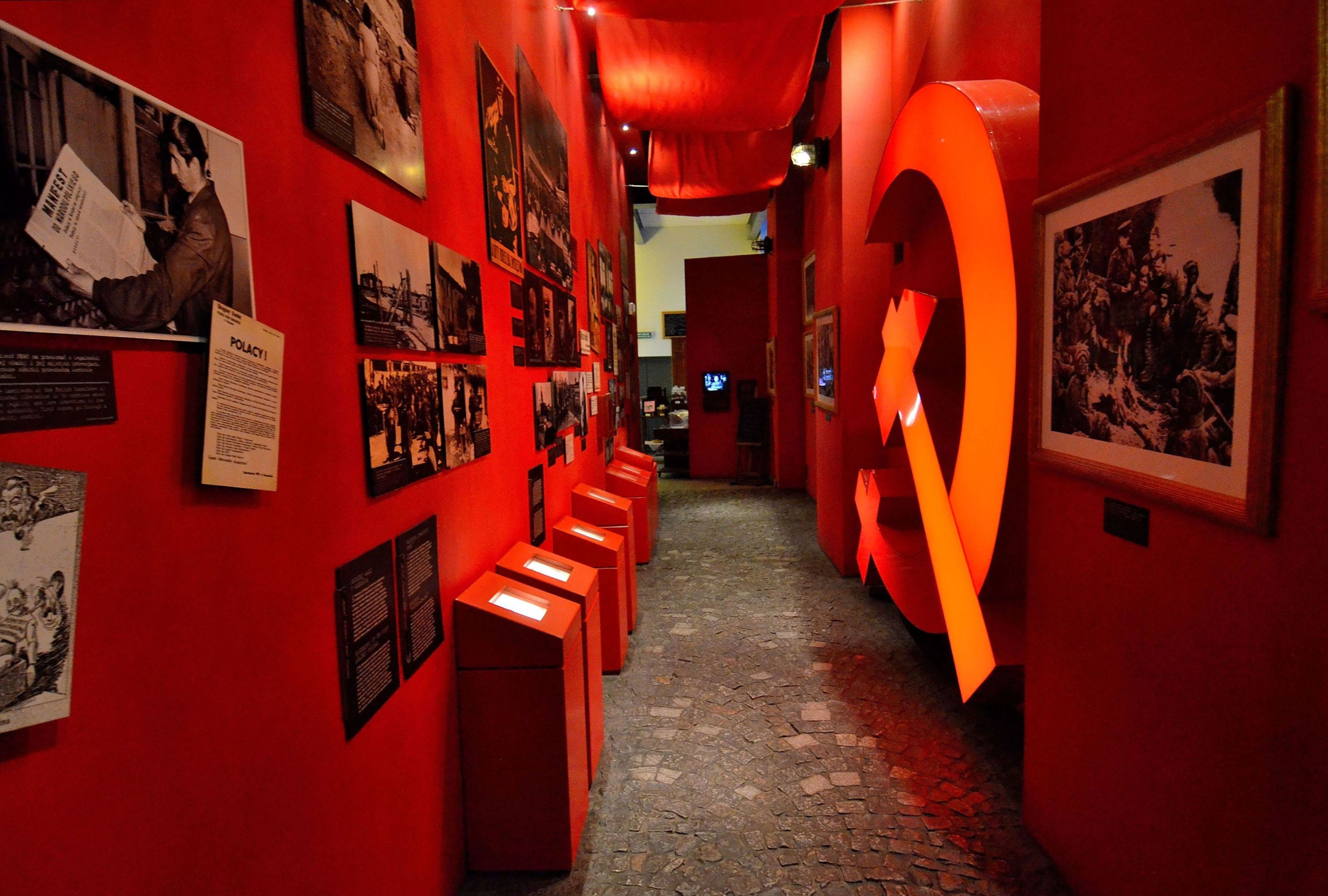
Soviet section

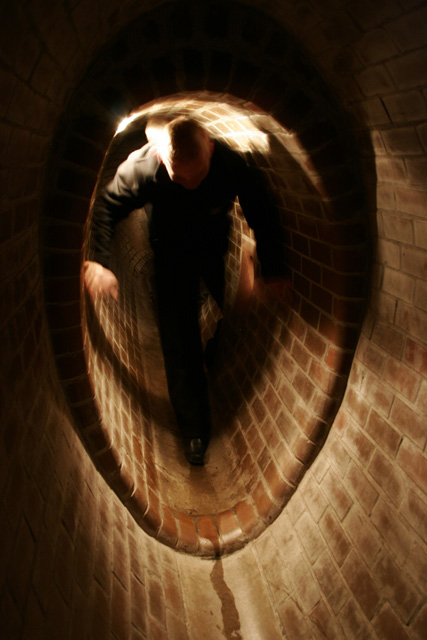
Replica of Warsaw sewer

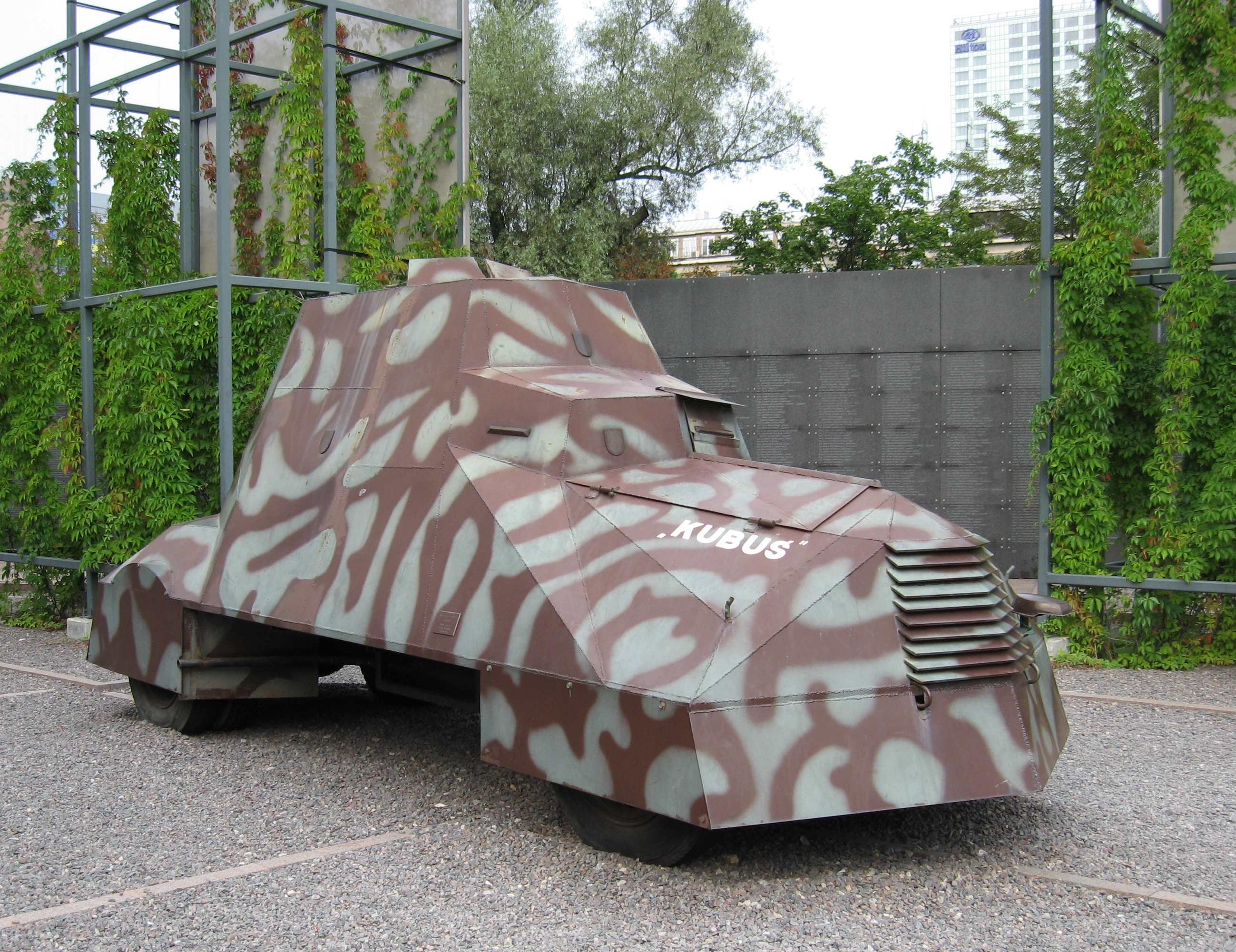
Kubuś armoured car

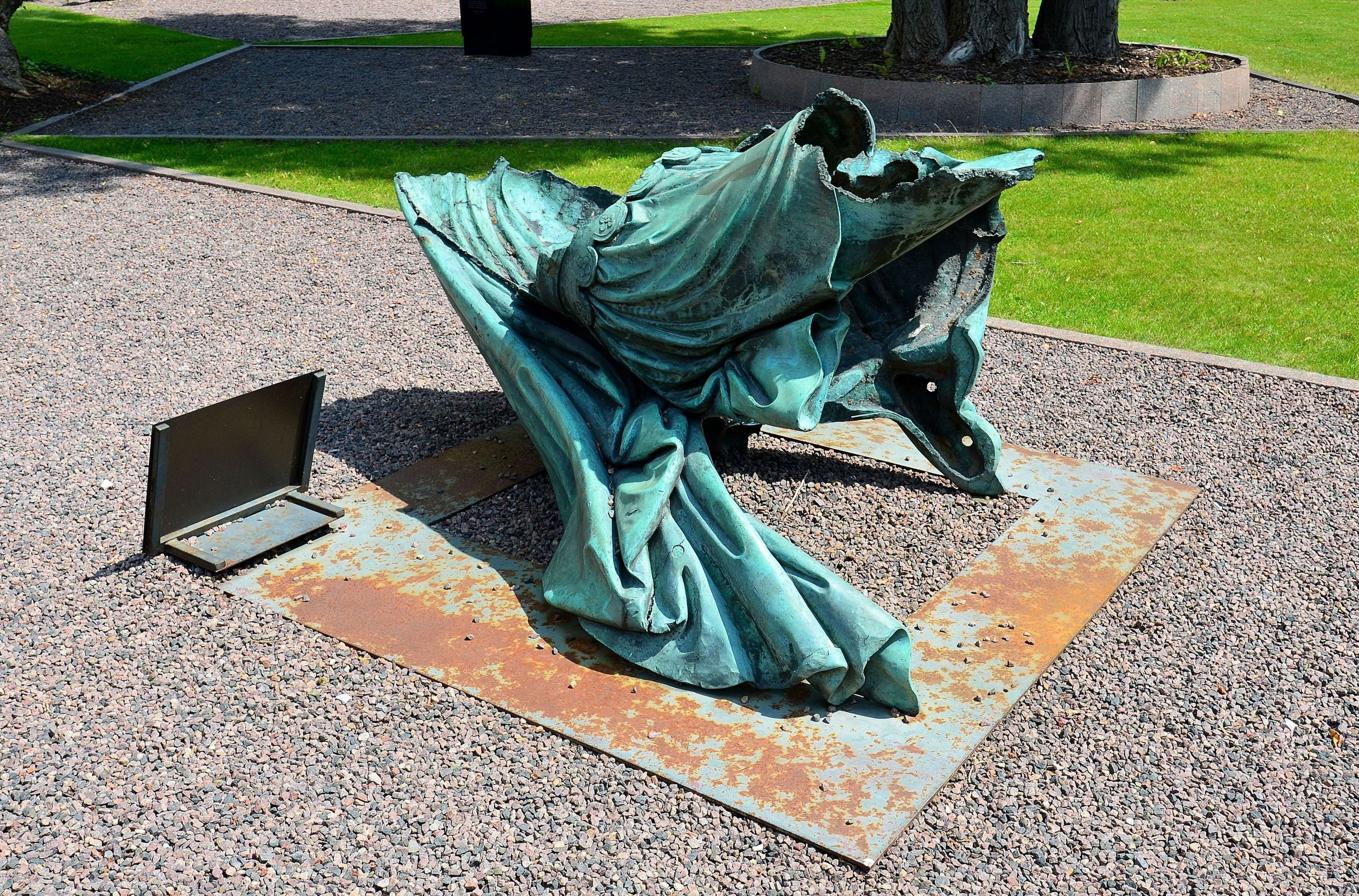
Remnants of a statue of Józef Poniatowski blown up by the Germans

== See also ==
- Home Army
- Operation Tempest
- Warsaw Uprising Monument
- The Little Insurrectionist
- Monument to the Women of the Warsaw Uprising
- Warsaw Uprising Memorial (Hamburg)
- Museum of the Second World War
- Mausoleum of Polish Rural Martyrology in Michniów
