= Róża Maria Goździewska =

Youngest nurse of the Warsaw Uprising

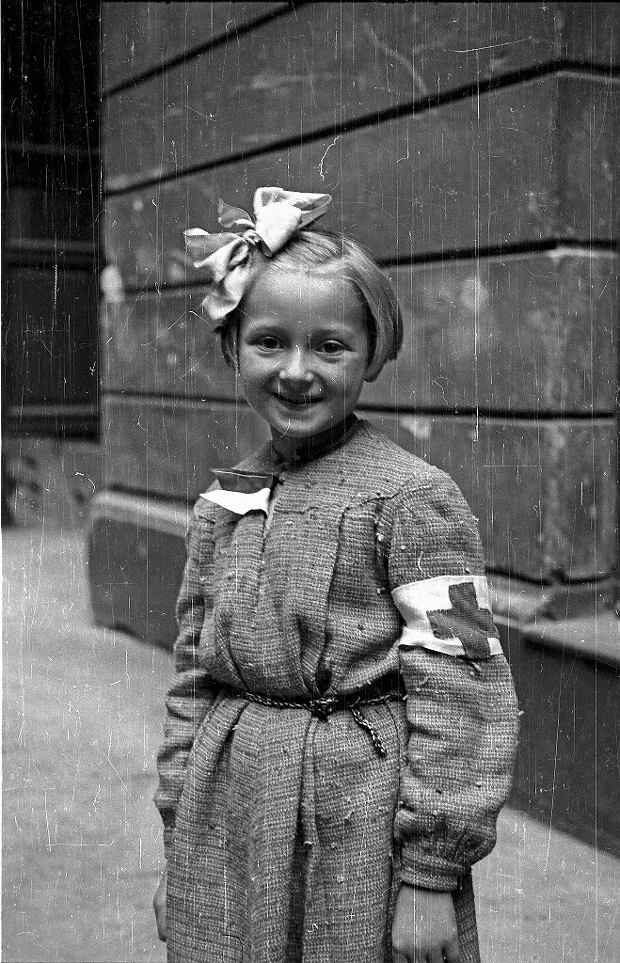
- Goździewska in 1944
- Born: 31 March 1936; Poland
- Died: 29 October 1989 (aged 53)
- Education: Silesian University of Technology
- Known for: The youngest nurse of the 1944 Warsaw Uprising
- Medical career
- Profession: Nurse

Róża Maria Goździewska (Polish pronunciation: [ˈruʐa ˈmarʲja ɡɔʑˈd͡ʑɛfska]; also known as Różyczka Goździewska, Różyczka being a diminutive of her first name, lit. "Little Rose"; 31 March 1936 – 29 October 1989) was a Polish nurse, known as the youngest nurse of the 1944 Warsaw Uprising when she was a child.

== Biography ==
Goździewska was born on 31 March 1936. Her father was killed by the Gestapo in 1943. A year later, on 1 August, the city of Warsaw was engulfed in the uprising against the German occupiers, with the civilian population caught in the middle. A number of child soldiers took part in the fighting on the side of the Polish insurgents.

Goździewska, eight years old at that time, was helping in the field hospital at 11 Moniuszki Street in Warsaw. She was described as a nurse because she made the patients smile, brought them water to drink, and tried to clear away the flies. That field hospital was associated with the Polish insurgents' Home Army Koszta Company unit. Her relative, Jadwiga Obretenny, 19 years old at the time, was also a nurse in the Uprising.

A photo of Goździewska, wearing a Red Cross armband, was taken in early August 1944 by Eugeniusz Lokajski, nom-de-guerre "Brok", a Home Army resistance fighter and photographer, who would perish a month later. The Uprising, after incurring major casualties among the civilian participants, was eventually crushed by the Germans on 2 October. Goździewska and her sister survived the war. Afterwards, she attended a gymnasium run by the Ursulines, graduated from the Silesian University of Technology, and in 1958, she emigrated to France, where she got married and had two children. She died on 29 October 1989.

== Remembrance ==
In the early 21st century her photo gained recognition, having been used in various materials published by the Warsaw Uprising Museum. Her photo was colorized in the 2010s, and by the late 2010s described as "well known" and even as one of the most famous photos of the Warsaw Uprising.

== See also ==
- Little Insurgent Monument
