= Rózsavölgyi =

Rózsavölgyi is a Hungarian toponymic surname, created from 'Rózsavölgy', now Ružindol, Slovakia or a Hungarised Jewish surname 'Rosenthal'. Notable people with the surname include:

- István Rózsavölgyi (1929–2012), Hungarian athlete
- Márk Rózsavölgyi (1789–1848), Hungarian composer
