= The Little Insurrectionist =

Statue by Jerzy Jarnuszkiewicz in Warsaw, Poland

- Mały Powstaniec
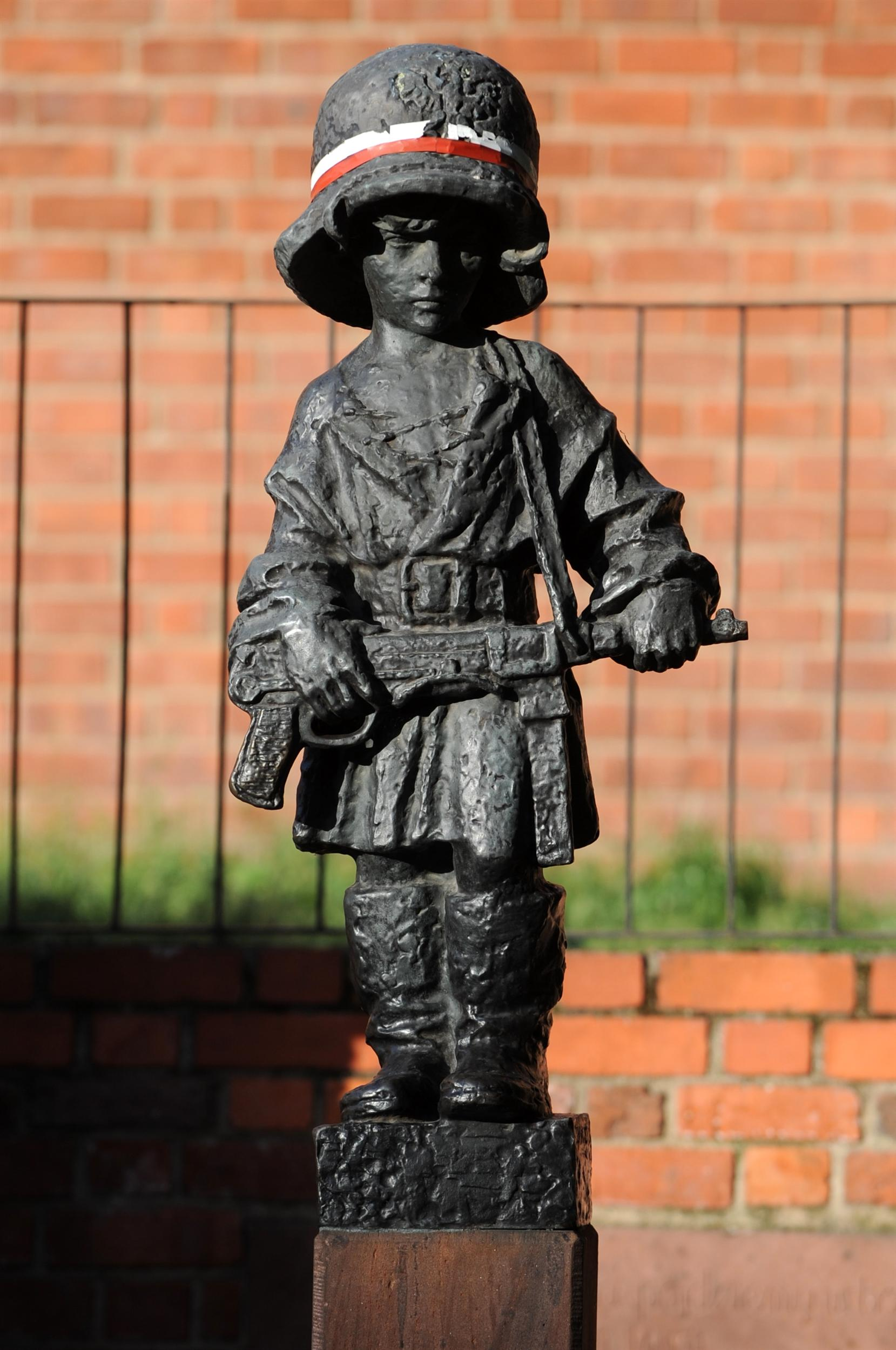
- Interactive map of The Little Insurrectionist
- Location: Warsaw Old Town, Warsaw, Poland
- Coordinates: 52°14′59″N 21°0′34″E
- Designer: Jerzy Jarnuszkiewicz
- Material: Bronze sculpture
- Completion date: 1 October 1983
- Dedicated to: The child soldiers of the Warsaw Uprising

The Little Insurrectionist (Polish: Mały Powstaniec) is a statue in commemoration of the child soldiers who fought and died during the Warsaw Uprising of 1944. It is located on Podwale Street, Warsaw, Poland, next to the ramparts of Warsaw's Old Town.

The statue is of a young boy wearing a helmet too large for his head and holding a submachine gun. Despite being sometimes colloquially called Antek Rozpylacz, it is not representing any specific child. The helmet and submachine gun are stylized after German equipment, which was captured during the uprising and used by the resistance fighters against the occupying forces.

Jerzy Jarnuszkiewicz created the design in 1946 and it was used for years for producing small statuettes, only to become the monument decades later. Polish scouts gathered the entirety of funds for the statue and it was unveiled on 1 October 1983 by Professor Jerzy Świderski – a cardiologist who during the uprising was a 14-years-old courier (pseudonym: "Lubicz") serving in the "Gustaw" regiment of the Home Army. Behind the statue is a plaque with the engraved words of "Warszawskie Dzieci" ("Varsovian Children"), a popular song from the period: "Warszawskie dzieci, pójdziemy w bój - za każdy kamień twój, stolico damy krew" ("Varsovian children, we'll head into battle—for every stone of yours, we shall give our blood").

== Gallery ==
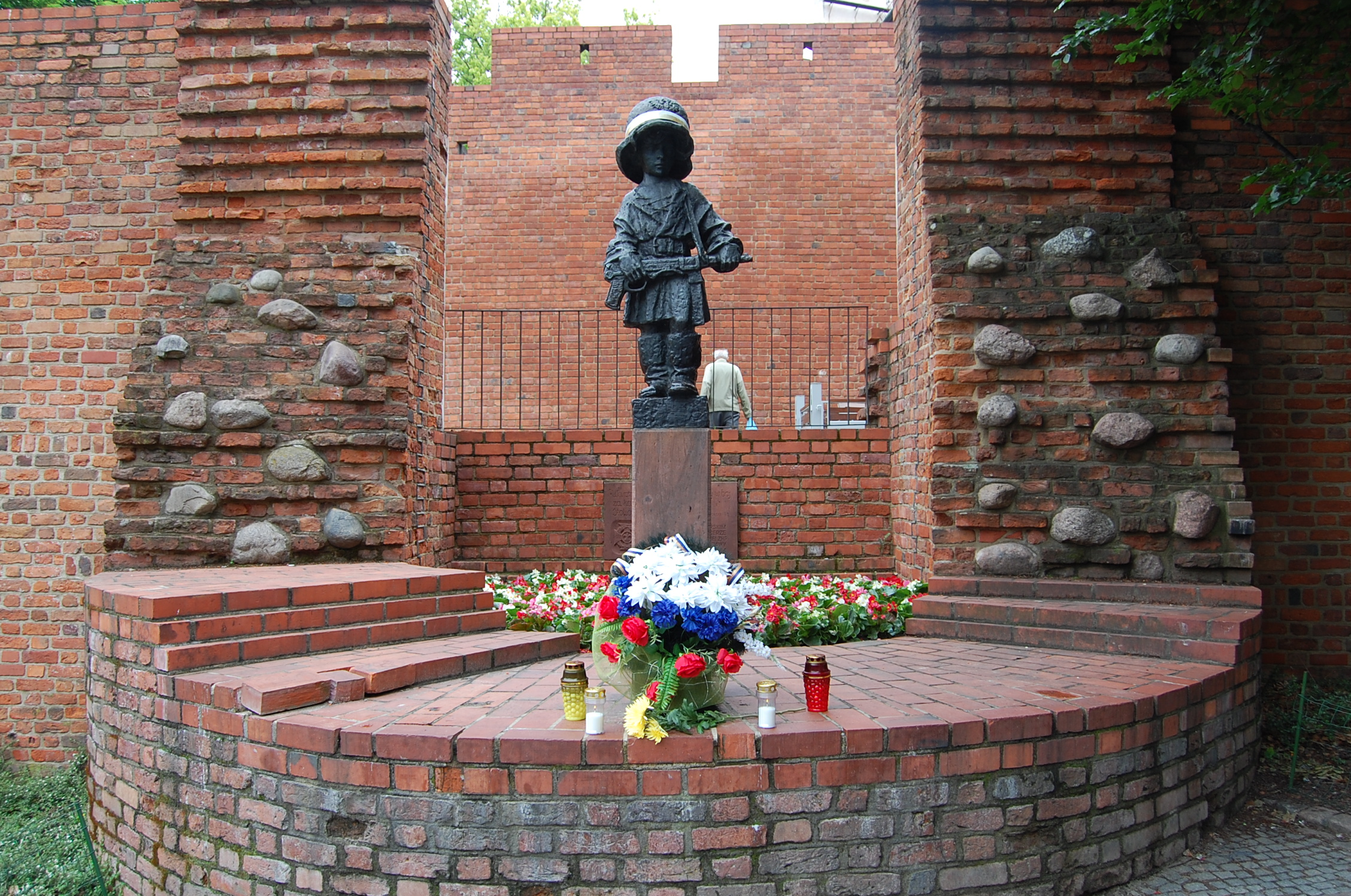
A general view of the statue

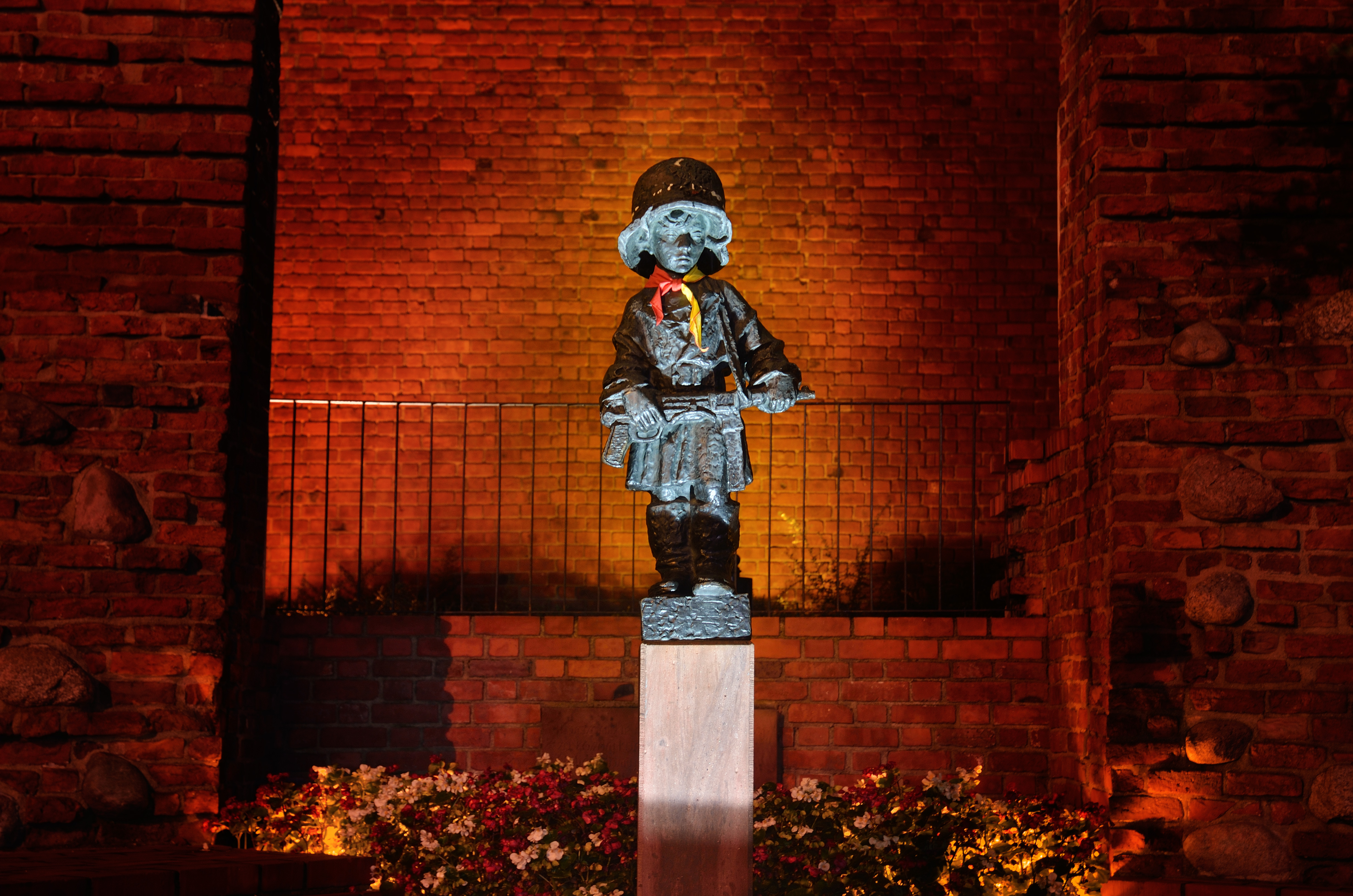
The statue at night

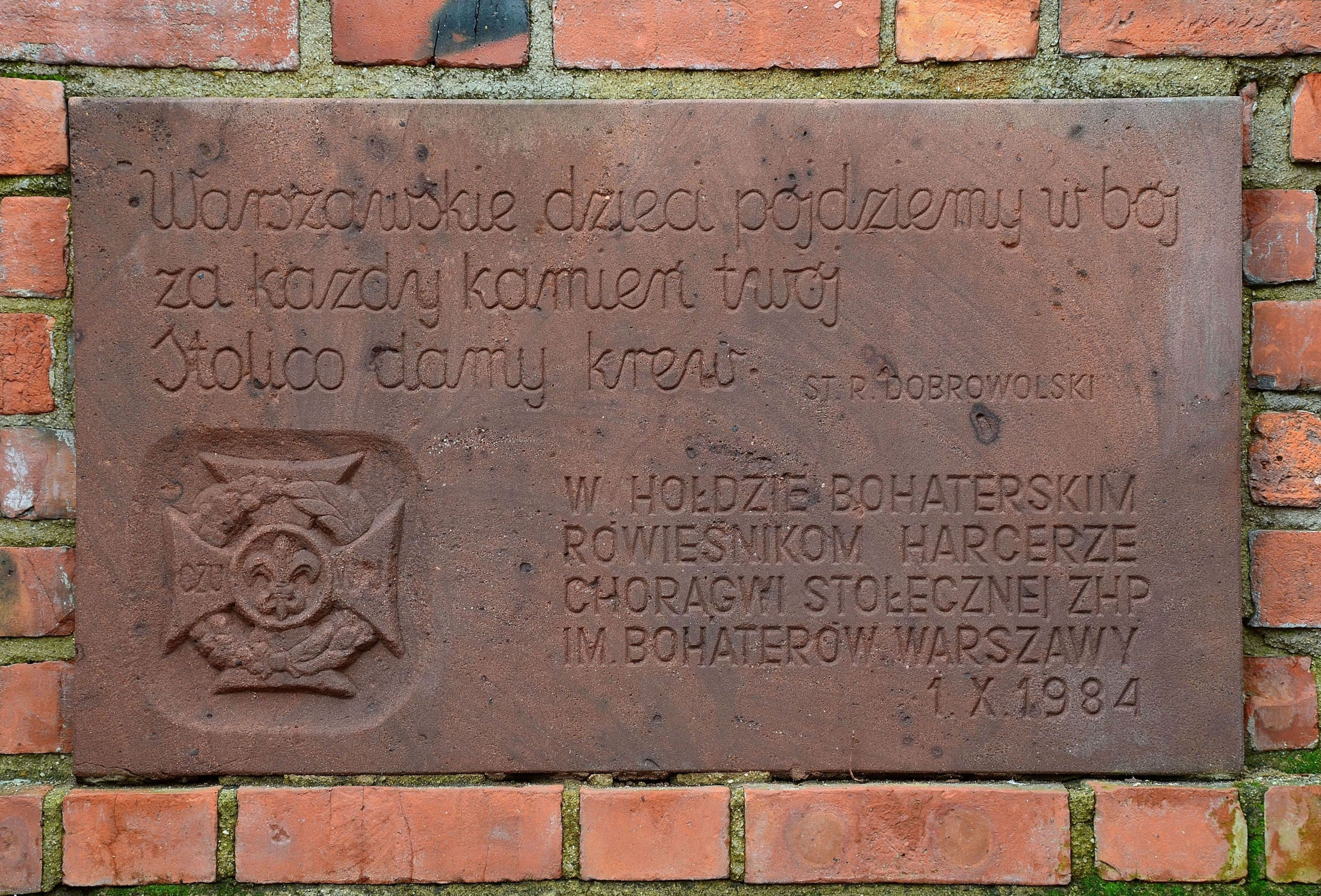
The plaque behind the statue

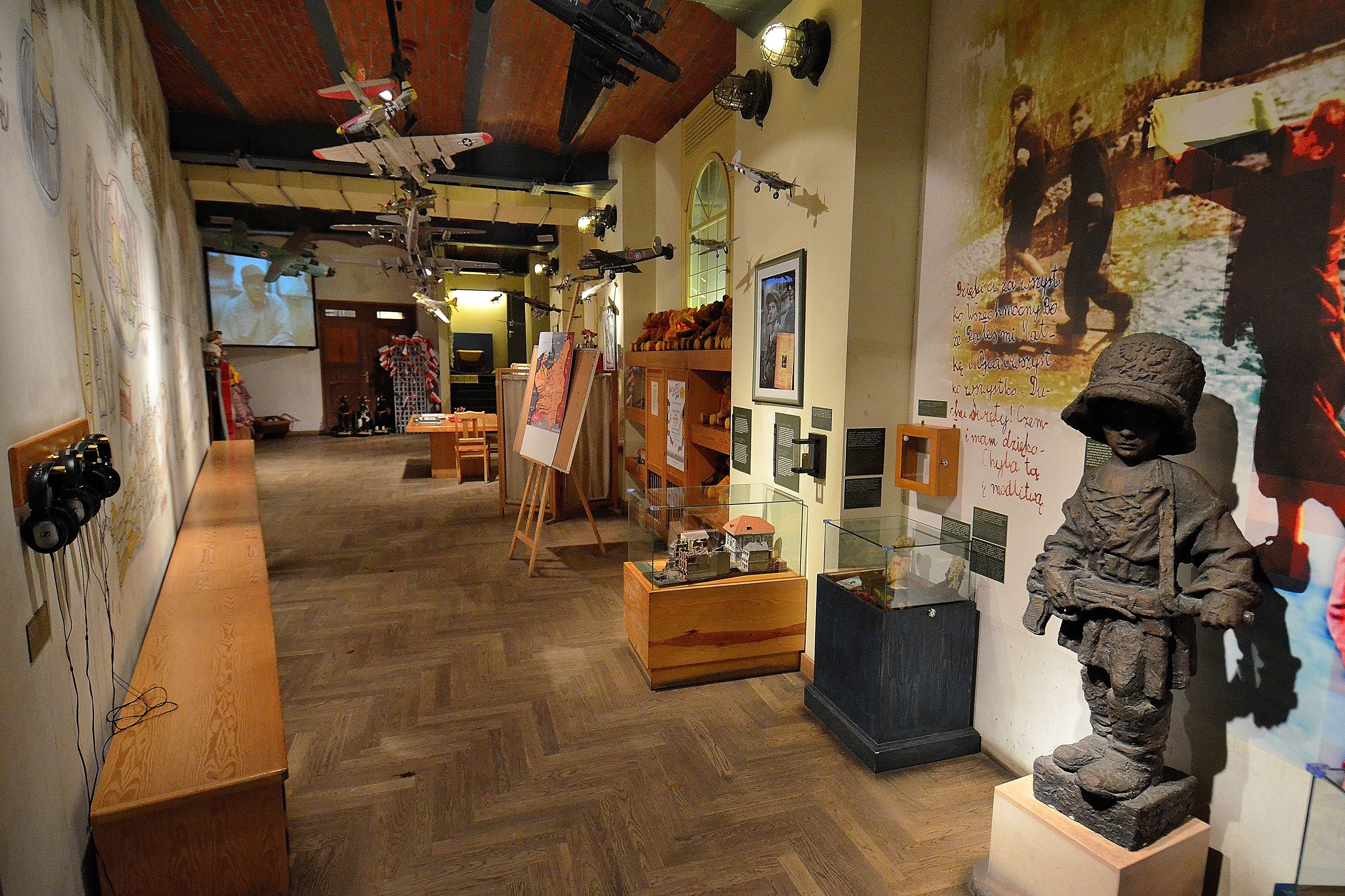
Copy of the statue at the Warsaw Uprising Museum

== See also ==
- Warsaw Uprising
- Home Army
- Polish resistance movement in World War II
- Monument to the Women of the Warsaw Uprising
- Warsaw Uprising Monument
- Warsaw Uprising Museum
- Warsaw Insurgents Cemetery
- Military use of children
