= Roza, Russia =

Roza (Russian: Роза) is the name of several inhabited localities in Russia.

Urban localities

- Roza, Chelyabinsk Oblast, a work settlement in Korkinsky District of Chelyabinsk Oblast

Rural localities

- Roza, Kirov Oblast, a village in Kobrsky Rural Okrug of Darovskoy District of Kirov Oblast
- Roza, Kurgan Oblast, a settlement in Sychevsky Selsoviet of Vargashinsky District of Kurgan Oblast
- Roza, Lipetsk Oblast, a settlement in Knyazhebaygorsky Selsoviet of Gryazinsky District of Lipetsk Oblast
