= Louise Übermasser =

Austrian actress

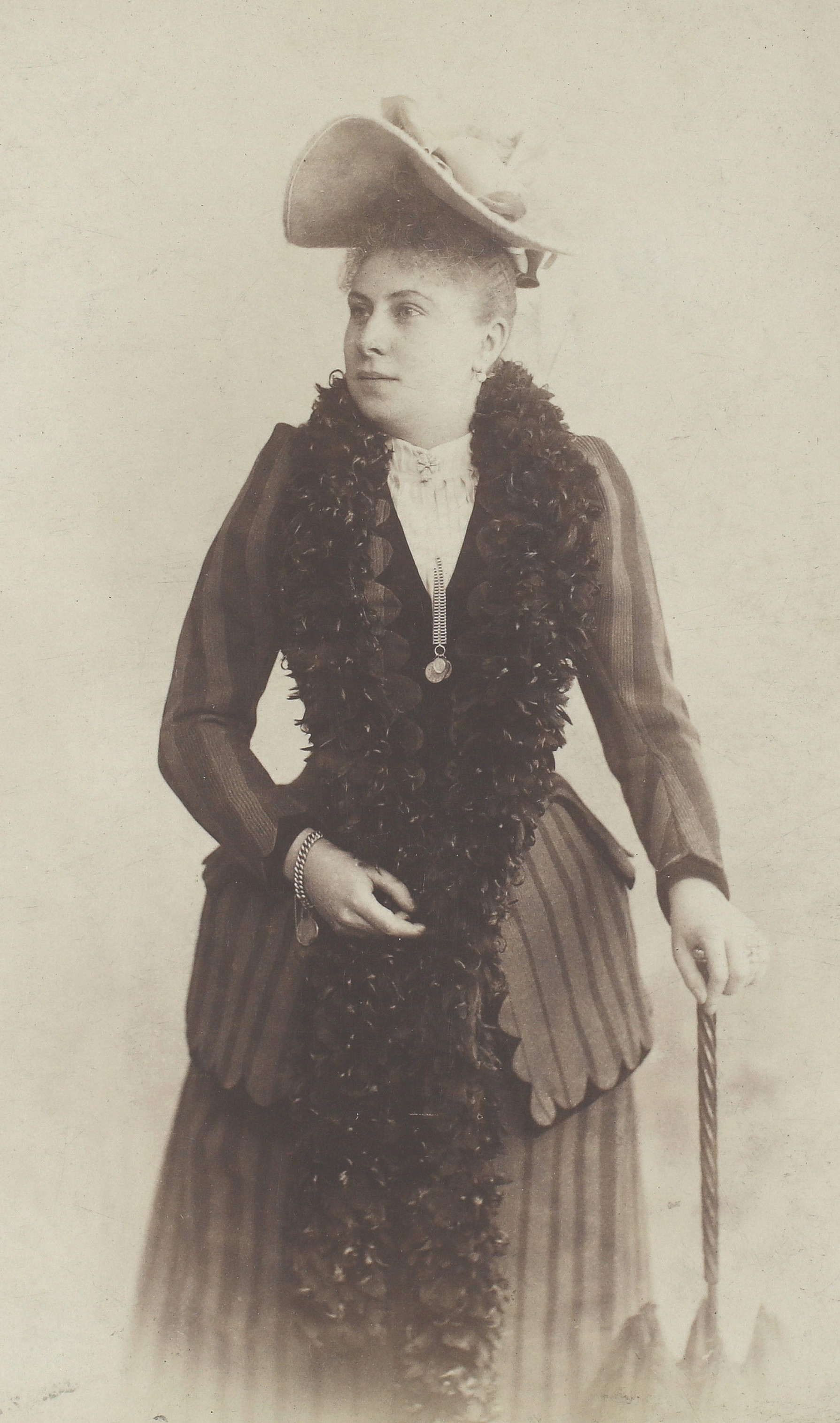
- Übermasser in 1891
- Born: Aloisia Elisabeth Übermaßer; March 30, 1862; Vienna, Austrian Empire
- Died: February 9, 1939 (aged 76); Vienna, Austria
- Spouses: Karl Streitmann (1882–1884); Gustav Schacherl (1895–1904); Dagobert Berthold Kary (1912–1913)

Louise Übermasser, real name Aloisia Elisabeth Übermaßer, from 1882 Streitmann, from 1889 Pauli, from 1895 Schacherl, from 1902 Charlé, from 1912 Kary (30 March 1862 – 9 February 1939) was an Austrian child actor, stage actress, theater director, singer and singing teacher.

== Life ==
Übermasser was born in Vienna. She is said to have already entered the stage at the Strampfer-Theater at the age of five. Later she was employed in children's roles at the Theater an der Wien and the Carltheater, where she caused a certain stir in Monsieur Alphons.

Later she was engaged at the city theater by Heinrich Laube. From 1882 she was active in operetta as well as in the show and comedy in Prague. In 1885 she left the engagement and came to the Theater an der Wien. After that she lived in Graz. Some years later she performed as first soubrette at the Theater in der Josefstadt. She directed the Alexanderplatz-Theater in Berlin for a short time (1892), then she was active again in the field of the soubrettes and was again a member of the Theater in der Josefstadt. Also after that she worked as an actress.

In December 1882 she married Karl Streitmann in Prague. The marriage was divorced only two years later which caused some more trials. In second marriage she was with the actor Gustav Schacherl between 1895 and 1904 (from 1902 Charlé), in third marriage from 1912 with the entrepreneur Dagobert Berthold Kary. Already in the following year she filed for divorce.
