= Róza Csillag =

Austrian-Hungarian opera singer

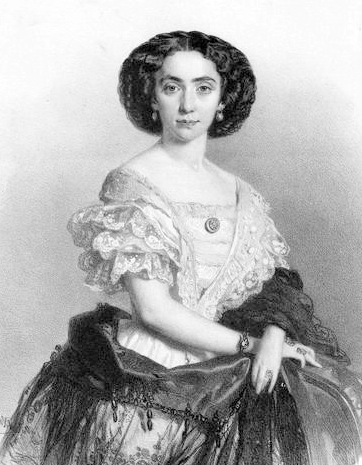
Róza Csillag by Eduard Kaiser

Róza Csillag or Rosa Herrmann-Csillag (born Róza Goldstein, 23 October 1832 – 20 February 1892) was an Austro-Hungarian mezzo-soprano opera singer.

Csillag was born in the Jewish community of Irsa in central Hungary (today Albertirsa), and her father was Moritz Goldstein, a hazzan of Irsa. She first attracted attention in the chorus of the Hungarian National Theatre at Budapest, where by 1849 she was playing the roles of Nancy in Flotow's Martha and Mátyás Hunyadi in Erkel's Hunyadi László.

Recommended to the Vienna Court Opera in 1850 by the singer Anna de La Grange, she received further training from Heinrich Proch and made her initial appearances there, most notably as Fidès in Meyerbeer's Le prophète. She delighted audiences with her beautiful mezzo-soprano voice and remained a favorite member of the company of the Vienna Court Opera until 1873. She also toured widely around Europe with much success, and in 1870 appeared in New York.

In 1852 she married the celebrated prestidigitator and magician Carl "Compars" Hermann. The opera singer and actress Blanche Corelli was their daughter.

When her voice was beginning to deteriorate, she became a singing teacher at the Vienna Conservatoire. She died in Vienna and was buried in the Central Cemetery there.

== Selected roles ==
- Mátyás Hunyadi in Hunyadi László, Erkel
- Fidès in Le prophète, Meyerbeer
- Nancy in Martha, Flotow
- Romeo in I Capuleti e i Montecchi, Bellini
- Lucrezia in Lucrezia Borgia, Gaetano Donizetti
