= Between Us Girls =

1942 film

- Film poster
- Directed by: Henry Koster
- Written by: True Boardman; Myles Connolly
- Based on: adaptation by John Jacoby play Le fruit vert by Régis Gignoux and Jacques Théry
- Produced by: Henry Koster
- Starring: Diana Barrymore
- Cinematography: Joseph Valentine
- Edited by: Frank Gross
- Music by: Charles Previn
- Distributed by: Universal Pictures
- Release date: September 4, 1942
- Running time: 85 minutes
- Country: United States
- Language: English
- Budget: $835,000
- Box office: $1 million (US rentals)

Between Us Girls is a 1942 American comedy-drama film directed by Henry Koster and starring Diana Barrymore, Kay Francis, Robert Cummings, John Boles, Andy Devine, and Scotty Beckett.

The film was made by Universal Pictures. It is a remake of the 1934 Austrian film A Precocious Girl which had been made by the German subsidiary of the company Deutsche Universal.

This film is now in the public domain due to failure to renew copyright after 27 years.

== Plot ==
Carrie, a strong-willed but mischievous 20-year-old actress, returns from a successful stage play in Detroit to New York to see her mother, Chris. After the two of them meet, Chris tells Carrie that she has a new boyfriend, Steve Forbes. Although she is in love with Steve, Chris admits that, because she worried that he would think of her as old if he knew she had a fully-grown daughter, she had implied to him during their conversations that Carrie was much younger.

Determined to help Chris succeed with Steve, Carrie disguises herself as a twelve-year-old, braiding her hair in pigtails, wearing children's clothes, and acting immaturely when Steve and his younger friend Jim Blake arrive. (A picture of Carrie as an adult that Steve and Jim accidentally see is described as Chris' alcoholic sister.) Despite Carrie ostensibly being a child, she and Jim are attracted to one another, and when it is revealed that he has a girlfriend, Carrie concocts an elaborate set of excuses to keep him with her, resulting in his girlfriend leaving him. In one of their outings, Carrie's hand is cut at an ice-cream parlor; in another, she drives a car recklessly and is arrested for speeding, but is able to narrowly escape telling the truth about her age.

The night before Carrie is scheduled to return to Detroit to act in a stage adaptation of Joan of Arc, Carrie and Chris go to a nightclub to celebrate, where they run into Steve and Jim. As she appears to be an adult, Carrie is introduced once again as Chris' adult sister, but Jim realizes the truth after seeing the cut on her hand. Jim angrily leaves the party; Carrie follows him, entering his car and explaining the truth to him as he drives. The two of them stop next to a lake, and Jim throws her in for revenge, before driving off.

Later, Steve proposes marriage to Chris, and Chris explains the scheme. Meanwhile, after realizing he loves Carrie, Jim sneaks onto the set of Joan of Arc, disguising himself as a knight and proposing to her mid-scene. Without breaking character, Carrie accepts the proposal.

== Cast ==
- Diana Barrymore as Carrie
- Robert Cummings as Jim Blake
- Kay Francis as Chris
- John Boles as Steve J. Forbes
- Andy Devine as Mike Kilinsky
- Ethel Griffies as Gallagher
- Walter Catlett as Sergeant
- Guinn Williams as Pop
- Scotty Beckett as Little prince [Leopold]
- Andrew Tombes as Doctor
- Mary Treen as Marybelle
- Irving Bacon as Soda clerk
- Walter Woolf King as Actor [King]
- Lillian Yarbo as Phoebe, the Maid

== Production ==
The film was originally known as Boy Meets Baby. In January 1942 Universal announced that it would be produced and directed by Henry Koster; Koster had directed most of Deanna Durbin's films to date but this was his first as producer. The male lead would be Bob Cummings and the script would be by Leonard Spigelglass based on a play by Régis Gignoux and Jacques Théry.

Universal wanted Deanna Durbin to star but she was reluctant to make the movie. The studio attempted to borrow Mary Lee from Republic but could not agree to terms. In March Universal cast Diana Barrymore who had just made Eagle Squadron (1941) for the studio. The title was changed to Love and Kisses, Caroline. The role involved the character having to play a 12-year-old girl, Sadie Thompson and Queen Victoria. Studio boss Cliff Work called it "the greatest part for a girl in 20 years."

The following month John Boles and Kay Francis joined the cast.

=== Shooting ===
Filming took place from April to July 1942.

Koster said Barrymore "was a hard person to cope with. She meant well but I think she had some of the mental difficulties her father had. She was always busy with other things when we wanted to shoot her scenes. Also it was not a good picture... They wanted to have a showcase for Diana Barrymore thinking that she might become a great actress. I don't think she had any of the Barrymore talent but she had the Madame Sans-Gene attitude on the set and in her private life. She was, well, may I say the poor man's Tallulah Bankhead."

Hedda Hopper visited the set to meet Barrymore. The day later Hopper wrote "Diana Barrymore is on the spot. With the great tradition of her family, she [Diana] can't behave like any other star out for a fling... She's likeable but has plenty to learn, and should stop playing around both on the set and in private life, which leads to those rumors floating around. No matter what Jack did, he treated the press as friend and she'd better change her tune – and quickly."

Hopper also wrote about an incident on set where Barrymore chased her then boyfriend Bramwell Fletcher all over the set to hit him."It interfered with the scene so Bob Cummings caught her and gave her a good sound spanking", wrote Hopper, "which delighted everybody on the set except for the youngest member of the Royal Family."

In June the film was retitled Between Us Girls.

== Reception ==
The Los Angeles Times called Barrymore "delightful". Hedda Hopper said "Diana as yet has no grasp of real screen acting. Young, headstrong and inexperienced she's starring in a picture in which she might be better playing a bit."

According to Filmink "This movie is agonising to watch, mostly because Barrymore is called upon to do so much acting and she’s simply not capable of it; you feel sorry for Cummings, who is as professional as ever, and tries desperately to salvage the movie."

== See also ==
- List of films in the public domain in the United States
- A Precocious Girl (1934)
