= The Unknown Guest =

The Unknown Guest may refer to:

- The Unknown Guest (1931 film), German film
- The Unknown Guest (1943 film), American film
