= Fräulein Lilli =

1936 Austrian comedy film

- Directed by: Max Neufeld; Hans Behrendt; Robert Wohlmuth
- Written by: István Békeffy; Siegfried Geyer; László Vadnay
- Produced by: Oskar Glück
- Starring: Franciska Gaal; Hans Jaray; S.Z. Sakall
- Cinematography: Willy Goldberger; Ernst Mühlrad
- Edited by: Ladislaus Vidor
- Music by: Barbara Bory; Artur Guttmann; Hans J. Salter; Fred Spielman; Stefan Weiß
- Production company: Projektograph Film
- Distributed by: Deutsche Universal-Film
- Release date: 25 September 1936
- Country: Austria
- Language: German

Fräulein Lilli or Miss Lilli is a 1936 Austrian comedy film directed by Hans Behrendt, Robert Wohlmuth and Max Neufeld. It starred Franciska Gaal, Hans Jaray and S.Z. Sakall. It was Gaal's last European film, although she did briefly start work in 1946 on Renee XIV, before it was abandoned during filming.

== Cast ==
- Franciska Gaal as Fräulein Lilli
- Hans Jaray as Fredy Scott
- S.Z. Sakall as Prokurist Seidl
- Karl Ehmann as Juwelier Höfer
- Richard Eybner as Van Eyben
- Karl Paryla as Jonny
- Darío Medina
- Anny Burg
- Benno Smytt
- Viktor Franz
- Wilhelm Schich
- Grit von Elben

== Bibliography ==
- Hans-Michael Bock and Tim Bergfelder. The Concise Cinegraph: An Encyclopedia of German Cinema. Berghahn Books.
- Dassanowsky, Robert. Austrian Cinema: A History. McFarland & Company Incorporated Pub, 2005.
