= The Emperor's Waltz (1933 film) =

1933 film

- German film poster
- German: Kaiserwalzer
- Directed by: Frederic Zelnik
- Written by: Alfred Halm; Frederic Zelnik
- Produced by: Gabriel Levy
- Starring: Mártha Eggerth; Paul Hörbiger; Carl Esmond
- Cinematography: Reimar Kuntze
- Edited by: Carl Otto Bartning
- Music by: Nico Dostal
- Production company: Zelnik-Film
- Distributed by: Aafa-Film
- Release date: 24 January 1933
- Running time: 91 minutes
- Country: Germany
- Language: German

The Emperor's Waltz (German: Kaiserwalzer) is a 1933 German musical film directed by Frederic Zelnik and starring Mártha Eggerth, Paul Hörbiger, and Carl Esmond. It was shot at the Tempelhof Studios in Berlin with sets designed by the art director Franz Schroedter. Location shooting took place around the Austrian spa town Bad Ischl.

== Plot ==
In the days of Austro-Hungarian Emperor Franz Josef, an aristocrat and his son both fall for the same woman.

== Distribution ==
Distributed by Aafa-Film, the film was released in German cinemas on 24 January 1933 with the censorship visa granted on 21 December 1932. In Austria, the film was released in 1933 by Koppelmann & Reiter under the title Audienz in Ischl. General Foreign Sales Corp. oversaw its release in the United States.

== Partial cast ==
- Mártha Eggerth as Mizzi Schlaghofer, mistress of Olgahof
- Paul Hörbiger as Count Eggersdorf
- Carl Esmond as Viktor Eggersdorf
- Fritz Kampers as Dr. Scharfinger
- Hansi Niese as Stasi, head maid
- S. Z. Sakall as Leitner - manufacturer from Budapest
- Trude Berliner as Annemarie Schulz from Berlin
- Olly Gebauer as Lori Stübinger - Soubrette
- Arthur Bergen
- Rupert Fischer
- Fritz Spira
- Helmut Krauss
- Ernst Pröckl
- Josef Reithofer
- Wera Schultz
- Rudolf Weinmann
- Betty Bird

== Bibliography ==
- Klaus, Ulrich J. Deutsche Tonfilme: Jahrgang 1933. Klaus-Archiv, 1988.
