= Beloved Augustin (1940 film) =

1940 film

- German film poster
- German: Der liebe Augustin
- Directed by: E. W. Emo
- Written by: Hanns Saßmann
- Produced by: Karl Künzel
- Starring: Paul Hörbiger; Michael Bohnen; Auguste Pünkösdy; Hilde Weissner
- Cinematography: Reimar Kuntze
- Edited by: Munni Obal
- Music by: Willy Schmidt-Gentner
- Production company: Wien-Film
- Distributed by: Terra Film
- Release date: 17 December 1940
- Running time: 95 minutes
- Country: Germany
- Language: German

Beloved Augustin (German: Der liebe Augustin) is a 1940 historical drama film directed by E. W. Emo and starring Paul Hörbiger, Michael Bohnen, and Hilde Weissner.

The film's sets were designed by the art directors Karl Haacker and Karl Weber. It was shot on location in Vienna.

== Cast ==
- Paul Hörbiger as Beloved Augustin, a minstrel
- Michael Bohnen as the Emperor
- Auguste Pünkösdy as the Empress
- Hilde Weissner as Marquise de Valais, a friend of the imperial family
- Hans Unterkircher as Marquis de Valais, her husband
- Rudolf Prack as Podl Schauerhuber, a musician
- Franz Böheim as Wastl, a musician
- Erich Nikowitz as Martl, a musician
- Richard Romanowsky as Thomas Wolfsgruber
- Maria Andergas as Mariandl, his niece
- Anton Pointner as Count Sinzendorf, the Lord Chamberlain
- Richard Eybner as Count Trautenberg
- Karl Ehmann
