= Duty Is Duty =

1931 film directed by Carl Boese

- Directed by: Carl Boese
- Written by: Bobby E. Lüthge; Károly Nóti
- Produced by: Gustav Althoff
- Starring: Fritz Spira; Ralph Arthur Roberts; Maly Delschaft
- Cinematography: Hans Karl Gottschalk; Willy Hameister
- Music by: Artur Guttmann
- Production company: Aco-Film
- Distributed by: Albö-Film
- Release date: 12 October 1931
- Running time: 86 minutes
- Country: Germany
- Language: German

Duty Is Duty (German: Dienst ist Dienst) is a 1931 German comedy film directed by Carl Boese and starring Fritz Spira, Ralph Arthur Roberts, and Maly Delschaft.

== Cast ==
- Fritz Spira as General von Hessendorf
- Ralph Arthur Roberts as Major von Koppel
- Maly Delschaft as Ilse, seine Frau
- Heinrich Fuchs as Leutnant Tübinger, Adjutant
- Herbert Kiper as Leutnant der Res., Dr. Neumann
- Ernst Rückert as Wachtmeister Krell
- Fritz Schulz as Kaczmarek
- Lucie Englisch as Anna
- Berthe Ostyn as Carola Hopkins, Soubrette
- Hugo Fischer-Köppe as Schani Hofer, Komiker
- Ernst Behmer as Pepi Tagsommer, Friseur

== Bibliography ==
- James Robert Parish & Kingsley Canham. Film Directors Guide: Western Europe. Scarecrow Press, 1976.
