= Twice Married =

1930 film

- Directed by: E. W. Emo
- Written by: Károly Nóti; Walter Schlee; Walter Wassermann
- Produced by: Arnold Pressburger; William A. Szekeley
- Starring: Liane Haid; Ralph Arthur Roberts; Lucie Englisch
- Cinematography: Willy Winterstein
- Edited by: E. W. Emo
- Music by: Hans May
- Production company: Cine-Allianz Tonfilm
- Distributed by: Süd-Film
- Release date: 11 August 1930
- Running time: 86 minutes
- Country: Germany
- Language: German

Twice Married (German: Zweimal Hochzeit) is a 1930 German comedy film directed by E. W. Emo and starring Liane Haid, Ralph Arthur Roberts, and Lucie Englisch. It was shot at the Babelsberg Studios in Berlin. The film's sets were designed by the art director Emil Hasler.

== Cast ==
- Liane Haid as Liane Grafenberg, Tochter
- Ralph Arthur Roberts as Generaldirektor Theodor Grafenberg
- Lucie Englisch as Mary
- S.Z. Sakall as Grafenbergs Schwager
- Harald Paulsen as Wilhelm Meyer
- Hermann Krehan as Wilhelm Meier
- Charles Puffy as Bankier Barany
- Paul Morgan as Notar
- Celia Lovsky as Fraulein Koch
- Gertrude Kohlmann as Telephonistin
- Hilde Schroedter as Telephonistin

== Bibliography ==
- Distelmeyer, Jan Alliierte für den Film: Arnold Pressburger, Gregor Rabinowitsch und die Cine-Allianz. Edition Text + Kritik, 2004.
- Parish, James Robert (1977). Film Actors Guide: Western Europe. Metuchen, NJ: Scarecrow Press. ISBN 978-0-8108-1044-0.
