= Peace of Mind (film) =

1931 film directed by Max Obal

- Directed by: Max Obal
- Written by: Bobby E. Lüthge; Károly Nóti
- Produced by: Gabriel Levy
- Starring: Fritz Kampers; Lucie Englisch; Paul Hörbiger
- Cinematography: Guido Seeber; Hugo von Kaweczynski
- Edited by: Else Baum
- Music by: Rolf Marbot; Bert Reisfeld
- Production company: Aafa-Film
- Distributed by: Aafa-Film
- Release date: 16 October 1931
- Running time: 92 minutes
- Country: Germany
- Language: German

Peace of Mind (German: Reserve hat Ruh) is a 1931 German comedy film directed by Max Obal and starring Fritz Kampers, Lucie Englisch, and Paul Hörbiger. It was shot on location around Berlin. The film's sets were designed by the art director Jacek Rotmil. It is one of a number of farces made in the early 1930s that were set during the pre-First World War German military.

== Cast ==
- Fritz Kampers as Paule Zapp
- Lucie Englisch as Aenne Schulz
- Paul Hörbiger as Dr. Egon Breitner
- Senta Söneland as Frau Dienstag, Wirtin
- Hugo Fischer-Köppe as Feldwebel
- Albert Paulig as Hauptmann Sauer
- Claire Rommer as Lotte Fiedler - Studentin
- Adolf E. Licho as Lotte Fiedlers Vater
- Lotte Steinhoff as Eva - Lotte Fiedlers Freundin
- Gerhard Bienert as Unteroffizier Krause
- Heinrich Fuchs as Meyrink
- John Mylong as Arthur Dreyer, Student
- Arthur Reppert as Rekrut

== Bibliography ==
- Grange, William. Cultural Chronicle of the Weimar Republic. Scarecrow Press, 2008.
