= The Buccaneer (1938 film) =

1938 film by Cecil B. DeMille

- Theatrical release poster
- Directed by: Cecil B. DeMille
- Written by: Jeanie MacPherson (adaptation)
- Screenplay by: Edwin Justus Mayer; Harold Lamb; C. Gardner Sullivan
- Based on: Lafitte the Pirate; 1930 novel by Lyle Saxon
- Produced by: Cecil B. DeMille
- Starring: Fredric March
- Cinematography: Victor Milner
- Edited by: Anne Bauchens
- Music by: George Antheil
- Production company: Paramount Pictures
- Distributed by: Paramount Pictures
- Release date: February 4, 1938
- Running time: 126 minutes
- Country: United States
- Language: English
- Budget: over $1 million
- Box office: $2 million (U.S. and Canada rentals)

The Buccaneer is a 1938 American adventure film made by Paramount Pictures starring Fredric March and based on Jean Lafitte and the Battle of New Orleans during the War of 1812. The picture was produced and directed by Cecil B. DeMille from a screenplay by Harold Lamb, Edwin Justus Mayer and C. Gardner Sullivan adapted by Jeanie MacPherson from the 1930 novel Lafitte the Pirate by Lyle Saxon. The music score was by George Antheil and the cinematography by Victor Milner.

The film stars Fredric March as Lafitte, Franciska Gaal and Akim Tamiroff with Margot Grahame, Walter Brennan, Ian Keith, Spring Byington, Douglass Dumbrille, Beulah Bondi and Anthony Quinn in supporting roles.

Cecil B. DeMille remade the film in 1958 in Technicolor and VistaVision with the same title, but because of ill health, he allowed Henry Wilcoxon, his longtime friend and associate, to produce it, and the film was directed by Anthony Quinn, who was his son-in-law at the time. DeMille received no screen credit, but did make a personal appearance in the prologue to the film, much as he did in The Ten Commandments two years prior. The 1958 version of The Buccaneer stars Yul Brynner, Charles Boyer and Claire Bloom, with Charlton Heston as Andrew Jackson. Douglass Dumbrille appeared in both versions and Quinn acted in the earlier version.

== Plot ==
In the closing stages of the War of 1812, Dolly Madison evacuates the White House as the British Army arrives and burns Washington. Jean Lafitte asks a young woman of good family, Annette de Remy, to marry him, but she asks him to give up his piracy first. He and his pirates set up a trading post in Louisiana in the swamp to sell luxury goods to New Orleans society that they have seized from foreign ships but have to suspend their sales when the governor, Ferdinand Claiborne, who has put a bounty on his head, appears with troops. Senator Crawford tells him that the British will offer him money to help them. Laffite leaves for the sea, where he finds one of his captains, Captain Brown, has seized the Corinthian, an American ship, contrary to his orders not to attack American ships, burning the ship and killing the crew and passengers. Laffite's man, Dominique You, saves the sole survivor, Gretchen, who had been made to walk the plank by Brown so no witnesses remained, and Lafitte hangs the captain for disobeying orders. Lafitte spares Gretchen despite her potential as a hostile witness, and Gretchen works as his maid and falls in love with him, despite You being in love with her. The British, who are planning to attack New Orleans, offer Laffitte position and wealth if he will guide them through the swamps to the city and threaten to attack his stronghold if he does not. Although his men are willing, Lafitte's loyalty is to Louisiana, and he delays answering the British, instead warning the city authorities of the British plans. On Crawford's advice, Brevet Major General Andrew Jackson, who leads the available American forces, does not trust Lafitte and instead attacks his stronghold in order to prevent him from aiding the English by capturing or killing his men, whom Lafitte has ordered not to resist. Meanwhile, Jackson decides to defend the city, though he has limited forces, despite Crawford's advice to surrender the city. Lafitte, who escaped from the attack, perseveres, appearing before Jackson in person and offering to supply him with flints and powder and provide experienced gunners to help defend the city if he will pardon his men. Jackson agrees to grant pardon after the forthcoming battle, although he will only promise to give Lafitte an hour's start from pursuit. Lafitte releases his men, killing Crawford in the process in a sword fight.

The entrenched American forces, with the help of Lafitte's artillery and gunners, mow down the advancing ranks of disciplined but overconfident British troops. At the victory ball, Gretchen is recognized as a passenger on the Corinthian and as wearing clothing and jewels from Annette's sister, who was a passenger on the ship. It is consequently revealed that Lafitte's men had sunk it, killing Annette's sister along with the other passengers and crew. Lafitte accepts ultimate responsibility for the tragedy and is only saved from a lynching by Jackson, who keeps his promise of giving Lafitte an hour's start. With Annette heartbroken, Lafitte leaves, reaching his ship safely, where he finds that Gretchen has stowed away.

== Cast ==
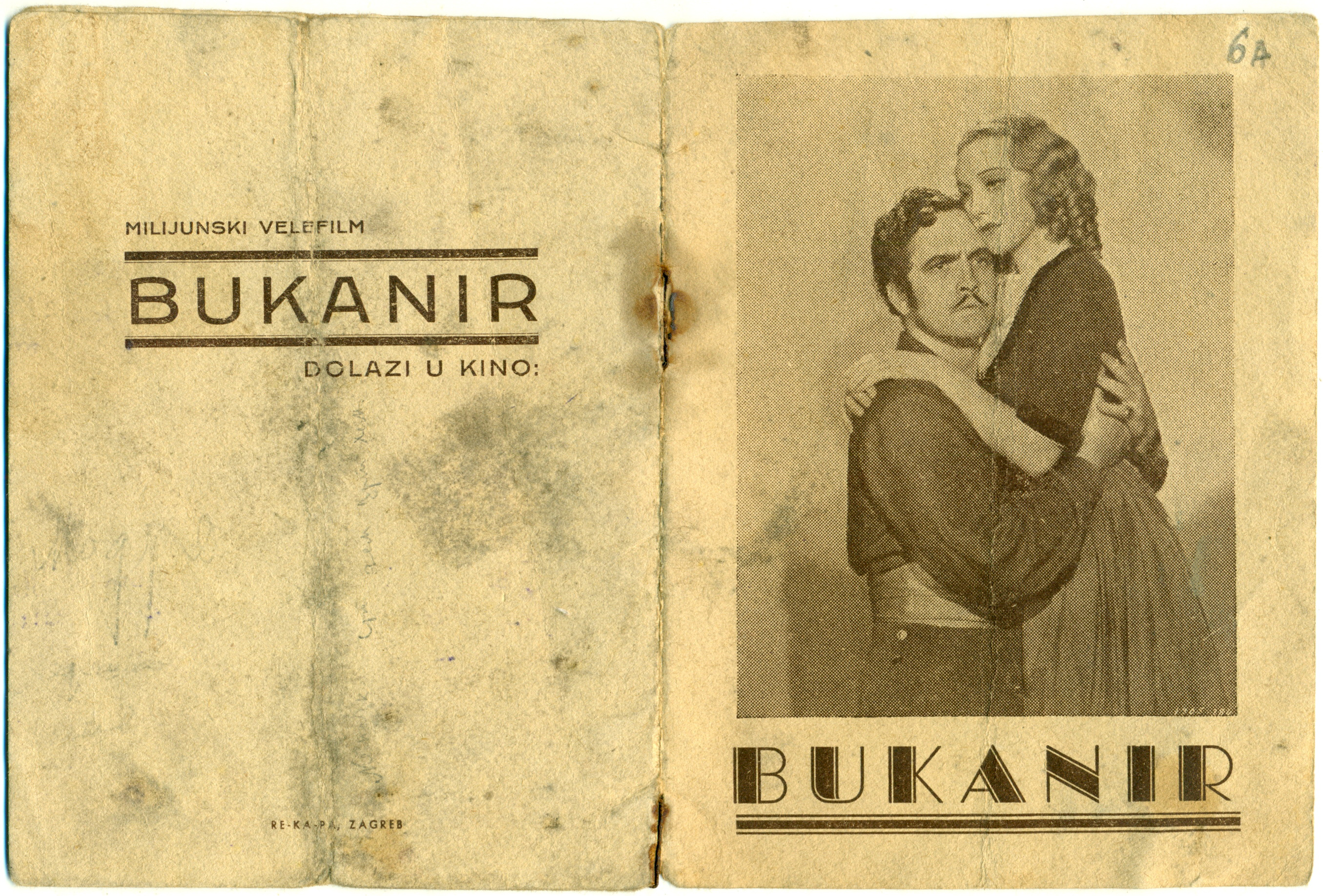
1940, original program for movie The Buccaneer, playing in a local cinema in Prilep, Macedonia (Kingdom of Yugoslavia)

- Fredric March as Jean Lafitte
- Franciska Gaal as Gretchen
- Akim Tamiroff as Dominique You
- Margot Grahame as Annette de Remy
- Walter Brennan as Ezra Peavey
- Ian Keith as Senator Crawford
- Spring Byington as Dolly Madison
- Douglass Dumbrille as Governor Claiborne
- Robert Barrat as Captain Brown
- Hugh Sothern as Andrew Jackson
- John Rogers as Mouse
- Beulah Bondi as Aunt Charlotte
- Anthony Quinn as Beluche
- Louise Campbell as Marie de Remy
- Montagu Love as Admiral Cockburn
- Eric Stanley as General Ross
- Fred Kohler as Gramby
- Gilbert Emery as Captain Lockyer
- Holmes Herbert as Captain McWilliams
- Evelyn Keyes as Madeleine
- Francis McDonald as Camden Blount
- Frank Melton as Lieutenant Shreve
- Stanley Andrews as Collector of Port pirate
- John Hubbard as Charles (as Jack Hubbard)
- Richard Denning as Captain Reid

== Reference in another film ==
The 1975 film The Day of the Locust used a fictionalized version of The Buccaneer's Hollywood premiere for its climactic finale.
