= The Girl Downstairs (film) =

1938 film by Norman Taurog

- Directed by: Norman Taurog
- Screenplay by: Harold Goldman; Felix Jackson; Karl Noti
- Based on: a short story by Sándor Hunyady
- Produced by: Harry Rapf
- Starring: Franciska Gaal; Franchot Tone; Walter Connolly
- Cinematography: Clyde De Vinna
- Edited by: Elmo Veron
- Music by: William Axt
- Production company: Metro-Goldwyn-Mayer
- Distributed by: Loew's Inc.
- Release date: 23 December 1938
- Running time: 77 minutes
- Country: United States
- Language: English

The Girl Downstairs is a 1938 American romantic-comedy film directed by Norman Taurog and starring Franciska Gaal, Franchot Tone and Walter Connolly. It is a remake of the 1936 Austrian film Catherine the Last, directed by Henry Koster, which had been a major hit for Gaal.

This was Franciska Gaal's third appearance in American films, and her first for MGM. It was her final American film before her return to Hungary in 1940.

== Plot ==
Well-to-do gentleman Paul Wagner seeks to romance attractive Rosalind Brown, while her wealthy father will not allow it. Therefore, Paul manipulates a resident skullery maid to gain access to the Brown household and appear to Rosalind. However, the scullery maid falls in love with Paul and, ultimately, he her.

== Main cast ==
- Franciska Gaal as Katerina Linz
- Franchot Tone as Paul Wagner
- Walter Connolly as Mr. Brown
- Reginald Gardiner as Willie
- Rita Johnson as Rosalind Brown
- Reginald Owen as Charlie Grump
- Franklin Pangborn as Adolf Pumpfel
- Robert Coote as Karl, Paul's Butler
- Barnett Parker as Hugo, the Browns' Butler
- James B. Carson as Rudolph
- Billy Gilbert as Garage Proprietor
