= Scandal in Budapest =

1933 film

- German film poster
- German: Skandal in Budapest
- Directed by: Steve Sekely; Géza von Bolváry
- Written by: Sándor Faragó (play); Aladar Laszlo; Károly Nóti
- Produced by: Joe Pasternak
- Starring: Franciska Gaal; Werner Pledath; Lotte Spira
- Cinematography: István Eiben
- Music by: Nicholas Brodszky
- Production companies: Deutsche Universal-Film; Hunnia Filmstúdió
- Distributed by: Deutsche Universal-Film
- Release date: 3 November 1933
- Running time: 83 minutes
- Country: Germany
- Language: German

Scandal in Budapest (German: Skandal in Budapest) is a 1933 German-Hungarian comedy film, filmed in Hungary in the German language and directed by Géza von Bolváry and Istvan Szekely and starring Franciska Gaal, Werner Pledath, and Lotte Spira. It was made at Budapest's Hunnia Studios by the European subsidiary of Universal Pictures, headed by Joe Pasternak, which had recently left Germany in the face of Hitler's "de-Judification" of that country.

A separate Hungarian-language version was also made, with a different cast, titled Romance in Budapest. Both versions were released in the United States by Arthur Mayer's DuWorld Pictures Inc.

The film was subsequently remade in Hollywood as Top Hat, starring Fred Astaire and Ginger Rogers.

== Cast ==
- Paul Hörbiger as Paul Murray
- Franciska Gaal as Eva Balogh
- Werner Pledath as Gutsbesitzr Balogh, ihr Vater
- Lotte Spira as Frau Balogh, seine Frau
- Oskar Sima as Direktor Roland
- Ursula Grabley as Tini, Evas Freundin
- S. Z. Sakall as Stangl
- Charles Puffy as Ein Herr
- Hermann Blaß
- Egon Brosig
- Olga Engl
- Sándor Góth
- Hans Reimann
- Else Reval
- Lotte Stein

== Bibliography ==
- Hales, Barbara & Weinstein, Valerie. Rethinking Jewishness in Weimar Cinema. Berghahn Books, 2020.
