= Carl Esmond =

Austrian-American actor (1902–2004)

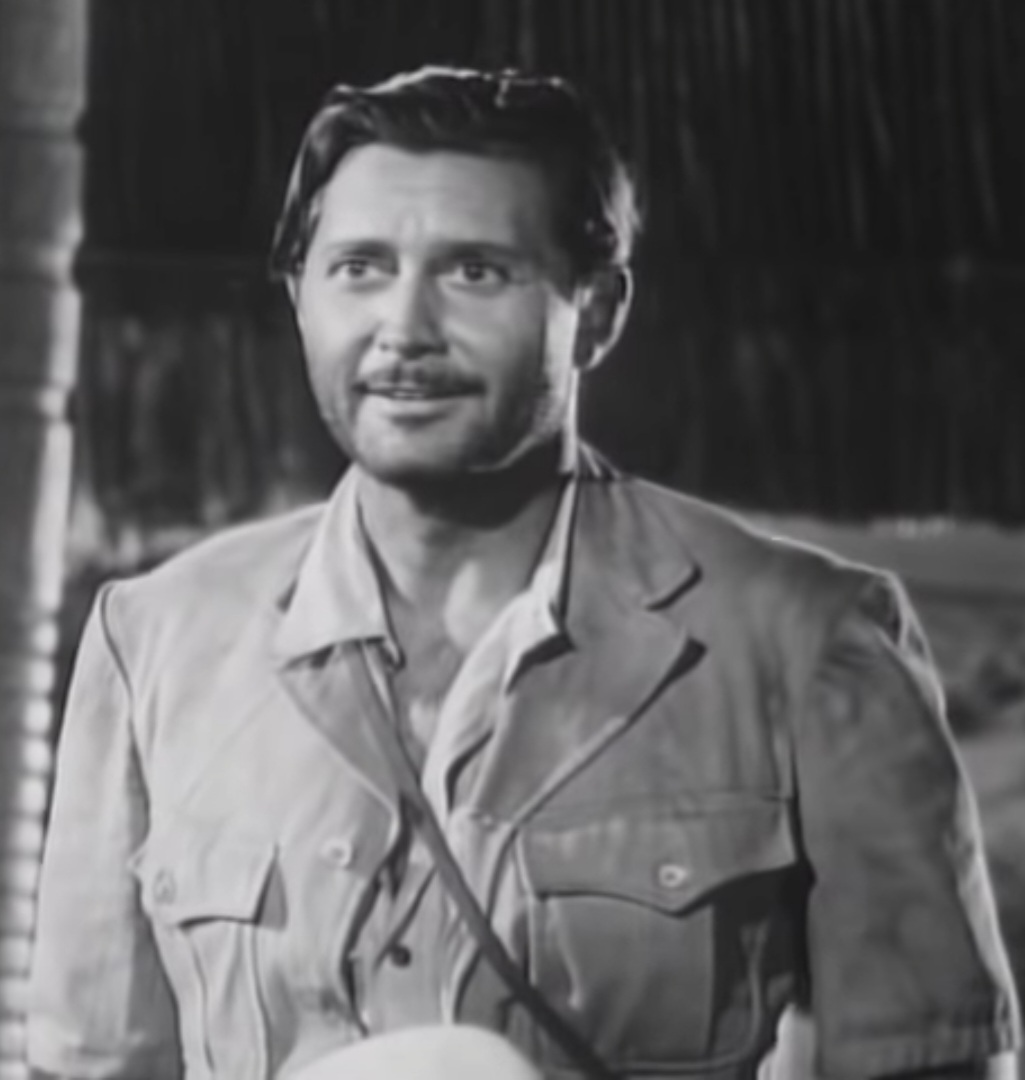
- Esmond in Sundown (1941)
- Born: Carl Cäsar Willy Simon; 14 June 1902; Vienna, Austria-Hungary (now Austria)
- Died: 4 December 2004 (aged 102); Brentwood, Los Angeles, U.S.
- Other names: Willy Eichberger; Charles Esmond
- Occupation: Actor
- Years active: 1933–1985
- Spouse(s): Ruth Taub (m. 19??)

Willy Eichberger (born Carl Cäsar Willy Simon; June 14, 1902– December 4, 2004) was an Austrian actor, credited in most of his English-language roles as Carl Esmond. He had a successful stage and screen career in Europe, before emigrating to the United States in the late 1930s as a refugee from Nazi Germany.

== Early life ==
Esmond was born Carl Cäsar Willy Simon in Vienna. Although his age was given as 33 in the passenger list when he arrived in the US in January 1938, in his naturalization petition his birth year is stated as 1902.

Prior to his acting career, he worked as a bank clerk. He studied at the University of Music and Performing Arts Vienna, where he was a pupil of Ernst Arndt. While in drama school, he changed his name to Willy Eichberger.

== Career ==
Esmond (as Eichberger) made his professional debut at the Burgtheater aged 22. He played leading roles on stage in Vienna, Berlin, and Hamburg. He made his film debut in the operetta The Emperor's Waltz (1933). He was active in the Viennese genre of light romantic comedies so popular in the Austria of the interwar period. One of his best known film roles in this period was in Max Ophüls' Liebelei. From 1935 to 1936, he was a matinee idol for UFA.

In 1933, he traveled to London to appear in the musical Blossom Time, for which used the stage name Carl Esmond, which thereafter became his name in English-language productions. He then starred as Prince Albert in the West End stage play Victoria Regina (replacing Vincent Price), to great critical success.

In January 1938, Esmond came to Hollywood to play a German World War I pilot in The Dawn Patrol. While in America, he received threats to his family from Das Schwarze Korps, a newspaper run by the Nazi SS. Three months later, the Anschluss occurred, and Esmond refused to return to Austria for fear of reprisal. He remained in America, where he continued to appear on stage as well as in English-language films.

He appeared in over 50 films and numerous television programs. During World War II, he often portrayed a Nazi villain, though he also played more sympathetic roles in films like Little Men (1940) and The Story of Dr. Wassell (1944). He worked with many prominent directors in Hollywood, including Cecil B. DeMille, Howard Hawks, Jacques Tourneur, Edmund Goulding, Fritz Lang and Otto Preminger.

After the war, he became a fixture of early television plays. In 1953, he had a brief return to his native Europe, once again billed as Eichberger, appearing in three films including Max Ophüls' Lola Montès.

His last on-screen work was in the made-for-television biopic My Wicked, Wicked Ways: The Legend of Errol Flynn (1985).

== Death ==
Esmond died in Brentwood, Los Angeles in 2004 at the age of 102.

== Filmography ==
- The Emperor's Waltz (1933) as Viktor Eggersdorf
- Liebelei (1933) as Oberleutnant Theo Kaiser
- Little Girl, Great Fortune (1933) as Georg Hellwig
- Inge and the Millions (1933) as Walter Brink
- Blossom Time (1934) as Count Rudi von Hohenberg
- Evensong (1934) as Archduke Theodore
- Love Conquers All (1934) as Willy Schneider
- Invitation to the Waltz (1935) as Carl
- Blood Brothers (1935) as Mirko
- Die Pompadour (1935) as François Boucher
- The Postman from Longjumeau (1936) as Chapelou
- The Empress's Favourite (1936) as Fähnrich Alexander Tomsky
- Fräulein Veronika (1936) as Paul Schmidt
- Der Weg des Herzens (1936) as Fred
- Court Theatre (1936) as Josef Rainer
- Romance (1936) as Graf Eduard Romanel
- The Dawn Patrol (1938) as Hauptmann Von Mueller
- Thunder Afloat (1939) as U-boat Captain
- Little Men (1940) as Professor Bhaer
- Sergeant York (1941) as German Major
- Sundown (1941) as Jan Kuypens
- Pacific Rendezvous (1942) as Andre Leemuth
- Panama Hattie (1942) as Lucas Kefler (uncredited)
- The Navy Comes Through (1942) as Richerd Kroner
- Seven Sweethearts (1942) as Carl Randall
- Margin for Error (1943) as Baron Max von Alvenstor
- First Comes Courage (1943) as Maj. Paul Dichter
- Address Unknown (1944) as Baron von Freische
- The Story of Dr. Wassell (1944) as Lt. Dirk van Daal
- Resisting Enemy Interrogation (1944) as Major von Behn (uncredited)
- The Master Race (1944) as Dr. Andrei Krystoff
- Ministry of Fear (1944) as Willi Hilfe
- Experiment Perilous (1944) as Maitland
- Without Love (1945) as Paul Carrell
- Her Highness and the Bellboy (1945) as Baron Zoltan Faludi
- This Love of Ours (1945) as Uncle Bob
- The Catman of Paris (1946) as Charles Regnier
- Lover Come Back (1946) as Paul Millard
- Smash-Up, the Story of a Woman (1947) as Dr. Lorenz
- Slave Girl (1947) as El Hamid
- Walk a Crooked Mile (1948) as Dr. Ritter von Stolb
- The Desert Hawk (1950) as Kibar
- Mystery Submarine (1950) as Lt. Heldman
- Racket Squad (1951)
- Stars Over Hollywood (1951)
- The World in His Arms (1952) as Prince Semyon
- Gruen Guild Playhouse (1952) as Baron de Sarnac, Chief of Police
- Biff Baker, U.S.A. (1952) as Major Morovik
- Schlitz Playhouse of Stars (1952) as Count Borselli
- Ford Theatre (1953) as Maurice de Szekely
- Love's Awakening (1953) as Michael Rainer
- Regina Amstetten (1954) as Prof. Werner Grüter
- Lola Montès (1955) as Doctor
- Crossroads (1956, TV Series) as Major Zuntz
- Lux Video Theatre (1955–1956, TV Series) as Pierre / Victor Laszlo
- Jane Wyman Presents: The Fireside Theatre (1956)
- Cheyenne (1956) as Col. Picard
- Passport to Danger (1955–1956, TV Series) as Fabian
- The Joseph Cotten Show (1955–1956, TV Series) as Vail
- Soldiers of Fortune (1955–1956, TV Series) as Nicholas Van Loon / Helmut Van Dorn
- Climax! (1957) as Paul Ehrenhardt
- Meet McGraw (1957) as Baron Von Schekt
- From the Earth to the Moon (1958) as Jules Verne
- Behind Closed Doors (1959) as Dr. Haas
- General Electric Theater (1959) as Nikolas Bethlan
- Thunder in the Sun (1959) as Andre Dauphin
- 77 Sunset Strip (1959) as Kurt von Paulus
- Five Fingers (1959, TV Series) as Marcuse
- Behind Closed Doors (1959, TV Series) as Dr. Haas
- Alcoa Presents: One Step Beyond (1960) as Emile
- The Deputy (1960) as Duke Dmitri
- Maverick (1961) as Comte deLisle
- Hawaiian Eye (1961) as Von Steuben
- Brushfire (1962) as Martin
- Hitler (1962) as Field Marshal Wilhelm Keitel
- Kiss of Evil (1963) as Anton (US TV version)
- The Travels of Jaimie McPheeters (1964) as Baron Pyrrhos
- Morituri (1965) as Busch
- Run for Your Life (1965) as Otto Hiltz
- Convoy (1965) as Field Marshal Von Spear
- Agent for H.A.R.M. (1966) as Professor Jan Stefánik
- The Man from U.N.C.L.E. (1966, TV Series) as Baron Freddy de Chasseur
- Garrison's Gorillas (1967, TV Series) as German General
- Insight (1967, TV Series)
- The Big Valley (1967, TV Series) as Marquis de Laccaise
- To Rome With Love (1970, TV Series) as Kurt
- O'Hara, U.S. Treasury (1972, TV Series) as August Werner
- McMillan & Wife (1972, TV Series) as Zeiss
- The Hardy Boys/Nancy Drew Mysteries (1977, TV Series) as Kolbe
- My Wicked, Wicked Ways: The Legend of Errol Flynn (1985, TV Movie) as General Von Helmuth (final film role)
