= Lucie Englisch =

Austrian actress

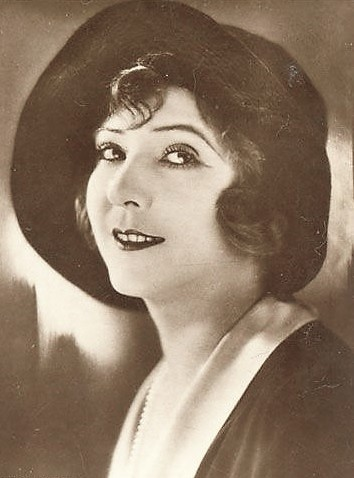
- Lucie Englisch around 1935
- Born: 8 February 1902; Baden bei Wien, Lower Austria, Austria-Hungary
- Died: 12 October 1965 (aged 63); Erlangen, Bavaria, West Germany
- Occupation: Actress
- Years active: 1929–1965 (film)
- Spouse: Heinrich Fuchs

Lucie Englisch (8 February 1902, in Baden bei Wien – 12 October 1965) was an Austrian actress.

She was married to the actor Heinrich Fuchs.

== Selected filmography ==
- The Night Belongs to Us (1929)
- Three Days Confined to Barracks (1930)
- End of the Rainbow (1930)
- Rooms to Let (1930)
- The Widow's Ball (1930)
- The Rhineland Girl (1930)
- Two People (1930)
- Twice Married (1930)
- Rendezvous (1930)
- By a Nose (1931)
- My Leopold (1931)
- Such a Greyhound (1931)
- Schubert's Dream of Spring (1931)
- Hooray, It's a Boy! (1931)
- The Unfaithful Eckehart (1931)
- Without Meyer, No Celebration is Complete (1931)
- Peace of Mind (1931)
- The Big Attraction (1931)
- The Unknown Guest (1931)
- Terror of the Garrison (1931)
- Duty Is Duty (1931)
- The Countess of Monte Cristo (1932)
- Gretel Wins First Prize (1933)
- The Sandwich Girl (1933)
- The Valiant Navigator (1935)
- The Fight with the Dragon (1935)
- The Postman from Longjumeau (1936)
- Where the Lark Sings (1936)
- The Unsuspecting Angel (1936)
- The Missing Wife (1937)
- The Vagabonds (1937)
- Little County Court (1938)
- Marionette (1939)
- The Dream of Butterfly (1939)
- Love Me, Alfredo! (1940)
- The Unfaithful Eckehart (1940)
- A Waltz with You (1943)
- Theodore the Goalkeeper (1950)
- Everything for the Company (1950)
- Dance Into Happiness (1951)
- Wild West in Upper Bavaria (1951)
- Mikosch Comes In (1952)
- The White Adventure (1952)
- The Imaginary Invalid (1952)
- Carnival in White (1952)
- Monks, Girls and Hungarian Soldiers (1952)
- Josef the Chaste (1953)
- On the Green Meadow (1953)
- The Night Without Morals (1953)
- Love is Forever (1954)
- The Angel with the Flaming Sword (1954)
- The Faithful Hussar (1954)
- His Daughter is Called Peter (1955)
- Love Is Just a Fairytale (1955)
- Two Bavarians in St. Pauli (1956)
- The Hunter from Roteck (1956)
- Like Once Lili Marleen (1956)
- Aunt Wanda from Uganda (1957)
- Between Munich and St. Pauli (1957)
- The Poacher of the Silver Wood (1957)
- The Schimeck Family (1957)
- Two Bavarians in the Jungle (1957)
- War of the Maidens (1957)
- Hello Taxi (1958)
- Candidates for Marriage (1958)
- When She Starts, Look Out (1958)
- Mein Schatz ist aus Tirol (1958)
- Gräfin Mariza (1958)
- Hunting Party (1959)
- Peter Voss, Hero of the Day (1959)
- Herrn Josefs letzte Liebe (1959)
- The Last Pedestrian (1960)
- Mal drunter - mal drüber (1960)
- The Hero of My Dreams (1960)
- Crook and the Cross (1960)
- Drei weiße Birken (1961)
- Festival (1961)
- Mother Holly (1961)
- Two Bavarians in Bonn (1962)
- Als ich beim Käthele im Wald war (1963)
