= It's a Big Country =

1951 film

- Theatrical release poster
- Directed by: Richard Thorpe; John Sturges; Charles Vidor; Don Weis; Clarence Brown; William A. Wellman; Don Hartman
- Written by: Episode One; William Ludwig (screenplay); Edgar Brooke (story); Episode Two; Helen Deutsch (screenplay); Episode Three; Ray Chordes (written by); Episode Four; Isobel Lennart (screenplay); Claudia Cranston (story); Episode Five; Allen Rivkin; Lucile Schlossberg; Episode Six; Dorothy Kingsley (screenplay); Episode Seven; Dore Schary; Episode Eight; George Wells (screenplay); Joseph Petracca (story)
- Story by: Dore Schary (story for picture)
- Produced by: Robert Sisk
- Starring: Ethel Barrymore; Gary Cooper; Van Johnson; Gene Kelly; Janet Leigh; Fredric March; William Powell; S. Z. Sakall; Marjorie Main; George Murphy; Keefe Brasselle; James Whitmore; Keenan Wynn; Nancy Davis; Lewis Stone
- Narrated by: Louis Calhern (uncredited)
- Cinematography: John Alton, A.S.C.; Ray June, A.S.C.; William Mellor, A.S.C.; Joseph Ruttenberg, A.S.C.
- Edited by: Ben Lewis; Fredrick Y. Smith, A.C.E.
- Music by: Johnny Green (musical supervision); Alberto Colombo; Adolph Deutsch; Lennie Hayton; Bronislau Kaper; Rudolph G. Kopp; David Raksin; David Rose
- Production company: Metro-Goldwyn-Mayer
- Distributed by: Loew's Inc.
- Release date: November 20, 1951
- Running time: 89 minutes
- Country: United States
- Language: English
- Budget: $1,013,000
- Box office: $655,000

It's a Big Country: An American Anthology is a 1951 American anthology film consisting of eight segments by seven directors: Richard Thorpe, John Sturges, Charles Vidor, Don Weis, Clarence Brown, William A. Wellman and Don Hartman.

== Plot ==
=== Episode 1: "Interruptions, Interruptions" (directed by Richard Thorpe) ===
A professor traveling on a train is asked by a talkative fellow passenger if he loves America. The professor asks, "Which America?" After listening to the professor explain the different aspects of the country, the passenger hears a woman comment on America and asks, "Lady, which America?"

=== Episode 2: "The Lady and the Census Taker" (directed by John Sturges) ===
Mrs. Brian Riordan, an elderly Irish immigrant living in Boston, is upset about not being counted in the 1950 census. She visits newspaper editor Callaghan and asks him to intervene on her behalf. He sends reporter Michael Fisher to interview her by pretending to be a census taker, but she recognizes Fisher from the newspaper office. Callaghan phones every government office, including to the White House. When a census taker arrives, Mrs. Riordan insists on seeing his identification.

=== Episode 3: "The Negro Story" (no director) ===
In the five-minute narrated documentary, there are clips of a black midshipman becoming an ensign upon graduating from Annapolis, black sailors, WACs and paratroopers are shown, followed by scenes in London of the first black general, Benjamin O. Davis Sr., and his son Benjamin O. Davis Jr. The newsreel footage then covers prominent black sports figures, entertainers and other public figures.

=== Episode 4: "Rosika the Rose" (directed by Charles Vidor) ===
Hungarian immigrant Stefan Szabo claims that Hungarians and Greeks have hated each other for thousands of years. His daughter Rosa secretly marries Icarus Xenophon, a Greek man. When Stefan learns the truth, Icarus offers him a consoling cup of coffee.

=== Episode 5: "Letter from Korea" (directed by Don Weis) ===
Maxie Klein, a young Jewish soldier who was wounded during the Korean War, is on his way home. He stops along the way to find the widowed mother of an Army buddy who was killed in action. Maxie reads her a letter that he received from her son, and she asks for his mother's address so that she can write her.

=== Episode 6: "Texas" (directed by Clarence Brown) ===
A tall Texan tries to separate fact from myth.

=== Episode 7: "Minister in Washington" (directed by William A. Wellman) ===
In 1944, Rev. Adam Burch's parishioners in Washington, D.C. include the president of the United States, for whom he tailors his erudite sermons. The church sexton warns him that he is failing by ministering only to one person. Rev. Burch delivers a sermon apologizing for his neglect and the president congratulates him.

=== Episode 8: "Four Eyes" (directed by Don Hartman) ===
Miss Coleman, a school teacher in San Francisco, discovers that her pupil Joey needs glasses. Joey's father, Mr. Esposito, believes that the glasses are not necessary and will only bring Joey ridicule from his peers. However, Mr. Esposito learns the danger of his attitude.

== Cast ==
=== Episode 1 ===
- William Powell as Professor
- James Whitmore as Mr. Stacey
- Elisabeth Risdon as Diner on Train (uncredited)

=== Episode 2 ===
- Ethel Barrymore as Mrs. Brian Patrick Riordan
- George Murphy as Mr. Callaghan
- Keenan Wynn as Michael Fisher
- Ned Glass as Newspaper Office Receptionist (uncredited)
- Fred Santley as Census Bureau Supervisor (uncredited)
- Bill Welsh as Census Bureau Official (uncredited)

=== Episode 4 ===
- Jeralyn Alton as Yolande Szabo (uncredited)
- Gene Kelly as Icarus Xenophon
- Janet Leigh as Rosa Szabo
- S. Z. Sakall as Stefan Szabo
- Sharon McManus as Sam Szabo
- David Alpert, George Conrad, Richard Grindle, Hal Hatfield, Anthony Lappas, Costas Morfis and Tom Nickols as Greek Athletes (uncredited)

=== Episode 5 ===
- Keefe Brasselle as Sgt. Maxie Klein
- Marjorie Main as Mrs. Wrenley

=== Episode 6 ===
- Gary Cooper as Texas

=== Episode 7 ===
- Van Johnson as Rev. Adam Burch
- Lewis Stone as Church Sexton
- Leon Ames as Secret Service Man

=== Episode 8 ===
- Angela Clarke as Mama Esposito
- Nancy Davis as Miss Coleman
- Fredric March as Joe Esposito
- Robert Hyatt as Joey Esposito
- Carol Nugent as Girl (uncredited)
- Rhea Mitchell as School Teacher (uncredited)
- Don Gordon as Mervin (uncredited)

== Reception ==
In a contemporary review for The New York Times, critic Bosley Crowther wrote: "[I]t is not modest or subtle in the way it professes a passion and devotion for the good old U. S. A. No writer of institutional advertising or Chamber of Commerce ballyhoo could be more facile with the verbiage than was the writer of the narration of this film. Such blushless enthusiasm, flowing as it does from the unmistakable voice of Louis Calhern, has a disquieting way of sounding like a rocks-and-rills 'commercial.' This is the chief flaw in the film. And it is the more distressing because the several vignettes contained, each written, directed and acted by different sets of artists and stars, are generally pleasant little items, not great or profound in any way but amusing and tolerably reflective of human foibles and attitudes. ... If it weren't for the shallow chauvinism of the narration, this would be an easy film to watch and generally enjoy. It's a big country, all right."

According to MGM records, the film earned $526,000 in the U.S. and Canada and $129,000 elsewhere, resulting in a loss to the studio of $677,000.
