= Three Days Confined to Barracks (1930 film) =

1930 film directed by Carl Boese

- German film poster
- German: Drei Tage Mittelarrest
- Directed by: Carl Boese
- Written by: Heinz Gordon; Bobby E. Lüthge; Károly Nóti; Géza von Cziffra
- Produced by: Arnold Pressburger
- Starring: Max Adalbert; Ida Wüst; Gretl Theimer; Lucie Englisch
- Cinematography: Robert Lach
- Edited by: Max Brenner
- Music by: Nico Dostal
- Production company: Cine-Allianz Tonfilm
- Distributed by: Messtro-Film
- Release date: 10 November 1930
- Running time: 92 minutes
- Country: Germany
- Language: German

Three Days Confined to Barracks (German: Drei Tage Mittelarrest) is a 1930 German comedy film directed by Carl Boese and starring Max Adalbert, Ida Wüst, and Gretl Theimer. The film is a farce set around a military barracks. It was a major hit on its release. It was shot at the Tempelhof Studios in Berlin. The film's sets were designed by the art director Emil Hasler. It was later remade in 1955 under the same title.

== Cast ==
- Max Adalbert as Hoffmann
- Ida Wüst as Adelheid
- Gretl Theimer as Eva
- Lucie Englisch as Auguste
- Paul Hörbiger as Zippert
- Paul Otto as Major von Faber
- Alfred Döderlein as Erich Feldern
- Fritz Schulz as Max Plettke
- Felix Bressart as Franz Nowotni
- Hans Hermann Schaufuß as Dr. Strauch
- Hugo Fischer-Köppe as Krause
- Vicky Werckmeister as Frieda
- Hermann Krehan as Storch
- Henry Bender as Strabl
- Leo Peukert as Stabsarzt
