= Paris Honeymoon =

1939 film by Frank Tuttle

- Theatrical release poster
- Directed by: Frank Tuttle
- Written by: Frank Butler; Don Hartman
- Story by: Angela Sherwood
- Produced by: Harlan Thompson
- Starring: Bing Crosby; Franciska Gaal; Akim Tamiroff; Shirley Ross; Edward Everett Horton; Ben Blue
- Cinematography: Karl Struss
- Edited by: Alma Macrorie
- Music by: Gerard Carbonara; John Leipold; Ralph Rainger; Leo Shuken (uncredited)
- Production company: Paramount Pictures
- Distributed by: Paramount Pictures
- Release date: January 27, 1939
- Running time: 92 minutes
- Country: United States
- Language: English

Paris Honeymoon is a 1939 American musical film directed by Frank Tuttle and written by Frank Butler and Don Hartman. The film stars Bing Crosby, Franciska Gaal, Akim Tamiroff, Shirley Ross, Edward Everett Horton and Ben Blue. Filming took place in Hollywood from May 23 to July 1938 and the film was released on January 27, 1939, by Paramount Pictures.

== Plot ==
Lucky Lawton, a cowboy millionaire is about to marry Barbara. Unfortunately there has been a delay in finalizing Barbara's divorce from her previous husband and while this is being sorted out in Paris, Lawton is persuaded to visit a Balkan town - Pushtalnick - where he stays in a castle and has various misadventures. The elected Rose Queen - Manya - takes a liking to Lawton and romantic interludes take place. Lawton returns to Paris for his wedding but is still thinking about Manya and he returns to Pushtalnick in time prevent Manya marrying Peter. Lawton and Manya then drive off together.

== Cast ==
- Bing Crosby as 'Lucky' Lawton
- Franciska Gaal as Manya
- Akim Tamiroff as Mayor Peter Karloca
- Shirley Ross as Barbara Wayne
- Edward Everett Horton as Ernest Figg
- Ben Blue as Sitska
- Rafaela Ottiano as Fluschotska
- Gregory Gaye as Count Georges De Remi
- Luana Walters as Angela
- Alex Melesh as Pulka Tomasto
- Victor Kilian as Old Villager
- Michael Visaroff as Judge
- Keith Hitchcock as Butler
- Raymond Hatton as Huskins
- Evelyn Keyes as a village girl

== Reception ==
Bosley Crowther writing in The New York Times commented: "The Old World charm of Bing Crosby in a ten-gallon hat is the principal Parisian motif in “Paris Honeymoon” (at the Paramount) which marks a return to the ancient Crosby formula of the days before “Sing You Sinners.” There is something almost engaging, however, about the conventional Paramount-Crosby plot, with its irreducible intellectual content and the way everybody concerned just quietly ignores it, as well-bred people always ignore unpleasant necessities... Bing, for instance, never bothers to pretend that he is really a millionaire cowboy, really in love with Shirley Ross, the heiress divorcée... One thing about Bing, you never catch him acting. He is always himself."

Variety said: "Bing Crosby, back with a bundle of tuneful melodies, nonchalantly meanders through a light romance of the Prince Charming-peasant Cinderella type, displaying a more convincing personality than heretofore. With a group of known featured names surrounding Crosby, aiding considerably in dishing out the entertainment factors, picture is heading for substantial boxoffice...There's a greater ease and assurance displayed by Crosby in his handling of the lead spot than previously. He times his lines better, and gives a corking performance throughout. . . Crosby's four songs are exceptional..."

== Soundtrack ==
"I Have Eyes" (Ralph Rainger / Leo Robin) sung by Bing Crosby and Shirley Ross.
"You're a Sweet Little Headache" (Ralph Rainger / Leo Robin) sung by Bing Crosby.
"The Funny Old Hills" (Ralph Rainger / Leo Robin) sung by Bing Crosby.
"Joobalai" (Ralph Rainger / Leo Robin) sung by Bing Crosby.
"I Ain't Got Nobody" sung by Bing Crosby.
"Bulgarian Rose Song" (Ralph Rainger / Leo Robin) sung by chorus.

Bing Crosby recorded five of the songs for Decca Records. "I Have Eyes", "You're a Sweet Little Headache" and "The Funny Old Hills" all achieved top ten positions in the charts. Crosby's songs were also included in the Bing's Hollywood series.
