= Paul Hörbiger =

Austrian actor (1894–1981)

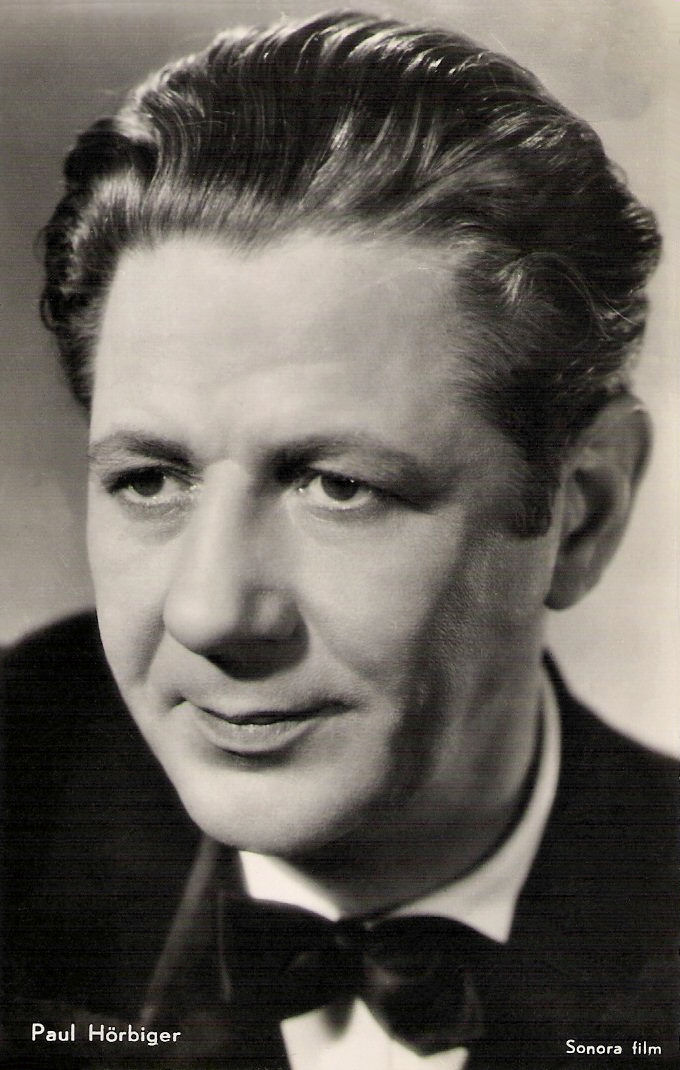
- Publicity photo, 1930s
- Born: 29 April 1894; Budapest, Austria-Hungary
- Died: 5 March 1981 (aged 86); Vienna, Austria
- Occupation: Actor
- Years active: 1928–1974
- Spouse: Josefa Gettke (m. 1921; div. 1939)
- Children: 4

Paul Hörbiger (29 April 1894 – 5 March 1981) was an Austrian theatre and film actor.

== Life and work ==
Paul Hörbiger was born in the Hungarian capital Budapest, then part of Austria-Hungary, the son of engineer Hanns Hörbiger, founder of the Welteislehre cosmological concept, and elder brother of actor Attila Hörbiger. In 1902, the family returned to Vienna, while Paul attended the gymnasium (high school) at St. Paul's Abbey in Carinthia. Having obtained his Matura degree, he served in a mountain artillery regiment of the Austro-Hungarian Army in World War I, discharged in 1918 with the rank of an Oberleutnant.

After the war, Hörbiger took drama lessons and began his acting career in 1919 at the city theatre of Reichenberg (Liberec). From 1920, he performed at the New German Theatre in Prague. His fame grew when in 1926 he was employed by director Max Reinhardt at the ensemble of the Deutsches Theater in Berlin, reaching a high point with his appointment at the Vienna Burgtheater in 1940. He also appeared at the 1943 Salzburg Festival, performing in the role as Papageno in Mozart's opera The Magic Flute.

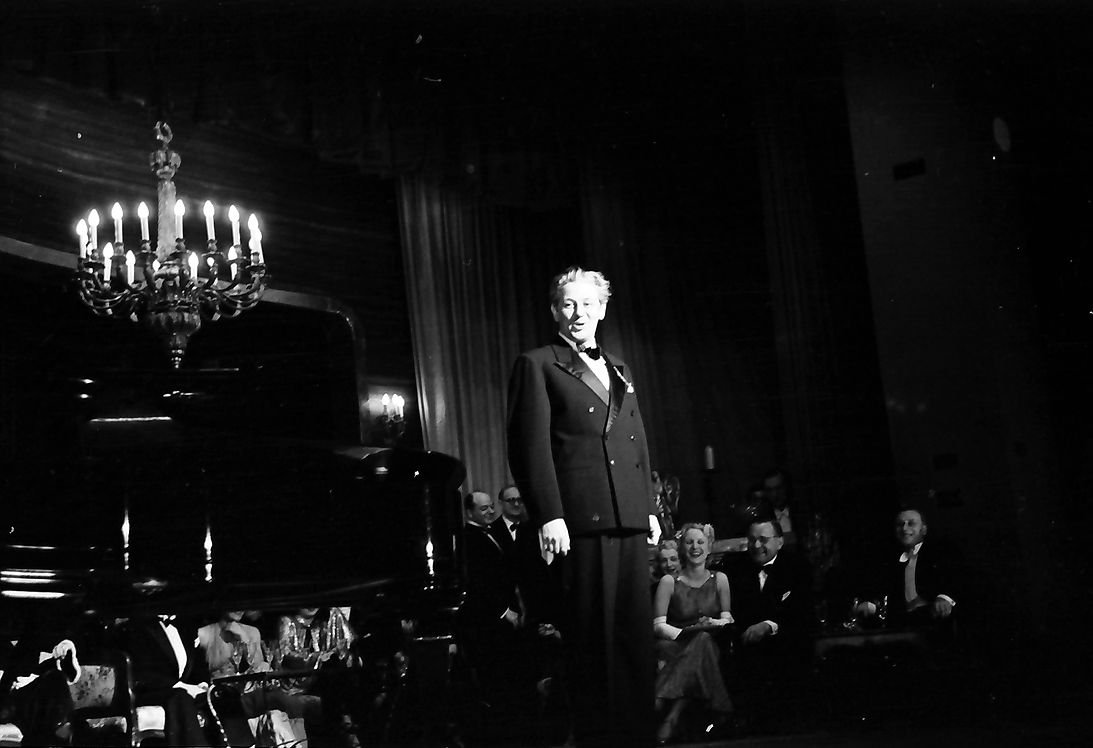
Hörbiger performing at the Kabarett der Komiker in Berlin, 1938

From 1928 he appeared in more than 250 films, mostly lightweight comedies of the Wiener Film genre popular among German and Austrian audiences during the 1930s and 40s. In 1936, he established his own filming company Algefa jointly with director E. W. Emo. In 1938, like many other celebrities, he openly acclaimed the Austrian Anschluss to Nazi Germany and continued his career, appearing also in propaganda films like Wunschkonzert ("Request concert") or Die grosse Liebe ("The great love"), which earned him an entry on Goebbels' Gottbegnadeten list ("God-blessed list"). On the other hand, Hörbiger inconspicuously met with opposition circles around Theo Lingen and Oskar Sima. In the latter days of World War II, he was arrested for treason by the Nazi authorities.

After the war, he resumed his career playing the porter who "talks too much" in Carol Reed's British film classic The Third Man (1949). Hörbiger, not speaking English at the time, learned his lines phonetically.

In the period 1947–49, he was chairman of the First Vienna FC football club.

Hörbiger remained one of the most popular German-speaking film actors of the 1950s and 1960s, starring in numerous Heimatfilm and Wiener Film productions. He again performed as the warm-hearted Viennese type and Heurigen singer, often together with Hans Moser and director Franz Antel. In his later years he again concentrated on theatre acting at the Burgtheater, where he last premiered in 1979 with Elias Canetti's Komödie der Eitelkeit ("Comedy of vanity").

== Personal life ==
In 1921 he married the actress Josepha Gettke with whom he had four children. Hörbiger died in Vienna aged 86 and is buried in an Ehrengrab at the Vienna Zentralfriedhof. The actress Christiane Hörbiger, daughter from his brother Attila's marriage with Paula Wessely, is his niece. The actors Christian Tramitz and Mavie Hörbiger are grandchildren of Paul Hörbiger.

== Selected filmography ==
- Sechs Mädchen suchen Nachtquartier (1928)
- Spione (1928, directed by Fritz Lang), as Chauffeur Franz
- The Great Adventuress (1928), as Detective
- Song (1928), as Sam
- The Gallant Hussar (1928), as Baron von Korporetzky
- Strauss Is Playing Today (1928), as Lamperlhirsch
- The Lady with the Mask (1928), as Michael - ein russischer Bauernknecht
- Dyckerpotts' Heirs (1928)
- Tales from the Vienna Woods (1928), as Alois Guschlbauer
- Hungarian Rhapsody (1928), as Kellner
- Das Letzte Souper (1928), as Balletmeister
- Die Räuberbande (1928)
- The Weekend Bride (1928), as Sekretær
- The Crazy Countess (1928), as Friseur Kose
- Asphalt (1929), as Ein Dieb
- The Woman Everyone Loves Is You (1929), as Dörsterlein
- Möblierte Zimmer (1929), as Kalinowski
- Ein kleiner Vorschuß auf die Seligkeit (1929), as Theobald Nuddlich, Fabrikant
- Why Cry at Parting? (1929), as Tortoni, ein Illusionist
- The Convict from Istanbul (1929), as Vlastos
- The Green Monocle (1929), as Snyder
- Women on the Edge (1929), as Siegfried Nürnberger, sein Impresario
- Three Around Edith (1929), as Nick
- Never Trust a Woman (1930), as Joachim
- The Immortal Vagabond (1930)
- Delicatessen (1930), as Josef, Diener bei Wallis
- Zwei Herzen im Dreivierteltakt (1930), as Ferdinand - ein Kutscher
- Nur Du (1930), as Graf Belmont, his stepfather
- Wie werde ich reich und glücklich? (1930), as Geheimrat Regen
- Das alte Lied (1930), as Xandel
- Two Hearts in Waltz Time (1930)
- Three Days Confined to Barracks (1930), as Zippert, secretary
- A Gentleman for Hire (1930), as Prof. Amanuel Wielander
- The Forester's Daughter (1931), as Der alte Baron
- Grock (1931), as Ein ungeschickter Geldsucher
- Her Grace Commands (1931), as Hofdetektiv Pipac
- The Merry Wives of Vienna (1931), as Anselm Leitner - Hofrat
- Walzerparadies (1931), as Dr. Pospischill
- Der Stumme von Portici (1931)
- The Squeaker (1931), as Josuah Harras, Reporter
- Errant Husbands (1931), as Otto Rux, Weinhändler
- My Heart Longs for Love (1931), as Gehring
- The Unfaithful Eckehart (1931), as Karl Moor
- Der Kongreß tanzt (1931), as Heurigen Singer
- Sein Scheidungsgrund (1931), as Rasmussen, Hellseher
- Der verjüngte Adolar (1931), as Prof. Haselhuhn, Privatgelehrter
- Peace of Mind (1931), as Dr. Egon Breitner
- Poor as a Church Mouse (1931), as Count Friedrich Thalheim
- Distorting at the Resort (1932), as Fritz Garreis
- You Don't Forget Such a Girl (1932), as Direktor Leopold Schrader
- A Tremendously Rich Man (1932), as Linkerton
- Peter Voss, Thief of Millions (1932), as Bobby Dodd
- Once There Was a Waltz (1932), as Franz Pirzinger
- A Mad Idea (1932), as Emil
- Quick (1932), as Lademann, Quick's manager
- Viennese Waltz (1932), as Verleger Haslinger
- Two Lucky Days (1932), as Pepi Freisinger
- Drei von der Kavallerie (1932), as Peter, ein Ulan
- A Blonde Dream (1932), as Vogelscheuche
- Scampolo (1932), as Gabriel
- Annemarie, die Braut der Kompanie (1932), as Musketier Karl Lehmann
- Trenck (1932), as Löwenwalde, Präsident des österr. Gerichtshofes
- Frederica (1932), as Pfarrer Brion
- Paprika (1932), as Dr. Paul Schröder
- The Secret of Johann Orth (1932), as Lanik
- The Invisible Front (1932), as Kommisssar Borgmann
- The Emperor's Waltz (1933), as Graf Eggersdorf
- The Big Bluff (1933), as Arthur Richman
- Two Good Comrades (1933), as Fritz Lehmann
- No Day Without You (1933), as Bonifazius, der Maler
- Liebelei (1933, directed by Max Ophüls), as Der alte Weyring - Kammermusiker
- A Song for You (1933), as Schindler
- Greetings and Kisses, Veronika (1933), as Paul Rainer
- Homecoming to Happiness (1933), as Karl Gruber
- Waltz War (1933), as Joseph Lanner
- Romance in Budapest (1933), as Murray Pál zongoramûvész
- Scandal in Budapest (1933), as Paul Murray
- Young Dessau's Great Love (1933), as Der Kaiser
- Miss Madame (1934), as Peter Valentin, Prokurist
- My Heart Calls You (1934), as Director Arvelle
- ...heute abend bei mir (1934), as Baron Denhoff
- The Csardas Princess (1934), as Feri von Kerekes
- Roses from the South (1934), as Johann Strauß
- Playing with Fire (1934), as Dr. Alfred Kramer
- Spring Parade (1934), as Kaiser Franz Joseph
- I Marry My Wife (1934), as Hubertus Behmer
- An Evening Visit (1934), as Karl Maria Fernebeck, Prokurist
- The Gentleman Without a Residence (1934), as Professor Mangold
- Hearts are Trumps (1934), as Paulsen
- Petersburger Nächte (1935), as Johann Strauß
- Fresh Wind from Canada (1935), as Meinkel, Angestellter Modehaus Granitz
- Last Stop (1935), as Karl Vierthaler, Straßenbahnschaffner
- Lessons in Love (1935), as Alois Weinberl
- The Royal Waltz (1935), as König Max II. von Bayern
- If It Were Not for Music (1935), as Florian Mayr, genannt 'Kraft-Mayr'
- Liebeslied (1935), as Pierre
- E lucean le stelle (1935)
- The Fairy Doll (1936), as Anton Freiherr von Kautzenbichl
- Three Girls for Schubert (1936), as Franz Schubert
- A Hoax (1936), as Peter Burgstaller, Oberkellner
- His Daughter is Called Peter (1936), as Dr. Felix Sandhofer
- The Cabbie's Song (1936), as Ferdinand Strödl, Fiakerkutscher
- Lumpaci the Vagabond (1936), as Lumpazivagabundus, Knieriem
- Doctor Engel (1936), as Dr. Engel
- Duvod k rozvodu (1937)
- Peter im Schnee (1937), as Dr.Sonthofer
- Cause for Divorce (1937), as Toni Bernhof
- The Vagabonds (1937), as Haselhof
- Florentine (1937), as Peter Russel - Kapitän der 'Florentine'
- Immer wenn ich glücklich bin..! (1938), as Josef 'Pepi' Reinhold, Theaterdirektor
- Einmal werd' ich Dir gefallen (1938), as Der Baron
- Heiraten – aber wen? (1938), as Dr. Kramer - Chirurg
- Heimat (1938), as Franz Heffterdingk
- Liebelei und Liebe (1938), as Alexander Settegast - Koch
- The Blue Fox (1938), as Stephan Paulus
- The Stars Shine (1938), as Himself
- Drunter und drüber (1939)
- Men Are That Way (1939), as Dody, Musik-Clown
- Salonwagen E 417 (1939), as Friedrich Christian Lautenschläger
- I Am Sebastian Ott (1939), as Kriminalrat Baumann
- Immortal Waltz (1939), as Johann Strauß Vater
- Kitty and the World Conference (1939), as Huber
- Hochzeitsreise zu dritt (1939)
- Maria Ilona (1939), as Ferdinand V., Kaiser von Österreich
- A Mother's Love (1939), as Notar Dr. Koblmüller
- Opera Ball (1939), as Georg Dannhauser
- Vienna Tales (1940), as Ferdinand
- Falstaff in Vienna (1940), as Hofschneider Josef Sturm
- Beloved Augustin (1940), as Der liebe Augustin - ein Bänkelsänger
- Operetta (1940), as Alexander Girardi
- Herzensfreud - Herzensleid (1940), as Josef Radl - Weinbauer
- Wunschkonzert (1940), as Himself
- Oh, diese Männer (1940), as Eberhard Reitinger
- Wir bitten zum Tanz (1941), as Roublée
- Brüderlein fein (1942), as Franz Grillparzer
- The Great Love (1942), as Alexander Rudnitzky, Komponist
- So ein Früchtchen (1942), as Kurt Ruppert
- Die heimliche Gräfin (1942), as Erzherzog Johann Sylvester
- Whom the Gods Love (1942), as Von Strack
- Laugh, Pagliacci (1943), as Canio
- Laugh Bajazzo (1943), as Canio
- Black on White (1943), as Prof. Klaus
- Romantische Brautfahrt (1944), as Baron Dagobert Schatzberghe
- Schrammeln (1944), as Hans Schrammel
- Die Zaubergeige (1944), as Violinist Georg Helmesberger
- Der Hofrat Geiger (1947), as Hofrat Franz Geiger
- The Angel with the Trumpet (1948), as Otto Eberhard Alt
- Kleine Melodie aus Wien (1948), as Professor Griebichler
- The Mozart Story (1948), as Strack (the court chamberlain)
- The Prisoner (1949), as Dr. Bianchon - Armenarzt von Paris
- The Third Man (1949), as Karl - Harry's Porter
- Die seltsame Geschichte des Brandner Kaspar (1949), as der Tod
- One Night Apart (1950), as Ferdinand Graf Lilienstein
- Der Seelenbräu (1950), as Dechant von Köstendorf
- The Black Forest Girl (1950), as Domkapellmeister
- The Orplid Mystery (1950), as Musik-Clown 'The Great Teatch'
- Glück muß man haben (1950), as Carl Millöcker
- Der Teufel führt Regie (1951), as Pierre Darcy
- Der alte Sünder (1951), as Ferdinand Bauer
- Die Frauen des Herrn S. (1951), as Sokrates
- Verklungenes Wien (1951), as Franz Jungwirt
- Veronika the Maid (1951), as Jansen sen.
- Der fidele Bauer (1951), as Matthias Scheichelroither
- When the Evening Bells Ring (1951), as Lehrer Storm
- Hello Porter (1952), as Professor Ferdinand Godai
- Voices of Spring (1952), as Lukas, Hausmeister
- My Name is Niki (1952), as Hieronymus Spitz
- Mein Herz darfst du nicht fragen (1952), as Geheimrat Hollbach
- The Land of Smiles (1952), as Professor Ferdinand Licht
- Mikosch Comes In (1952), as Dr. Paliwec
- I Lost My Heart in Heidelberg (1952), as Josef Degener
- You Only Live Once (1952), as Karl Heinemann
- 1. April 2000 (1952), as Augustin
- Hannerl (1952), as Hermann Gerstinger
- Die Fiakermilli (1953), as Honigberger, Pianist
- We'll Talk About Love Later (1953), as Geschäftsführer der 'Fledermaus'
- The Rose of Stamboul (1953), as Mehemed Pascha
- Drei, von denen man spricht (1953), as Präsident
- Young Heart Full of Love (1953), as Landesstallmeister
- Grandstand for General Staff (1953), as Oberst v. Leuckfeld
- The Dancing Heart (1953), as Fürst (Prince)
- Life Begins at Seventeen (1953), as Jacques Peronne
- The Private Secretary (1953), as Portier Julius
- Die Perle von Tokay (1954), as Ferencz Körös von Köröshazy, General a.D.
- The Abduction of the Sabine Women (1954), as Professor Martin Gollwitz
- The Faithful Hussar (1954), as Eberhard Wacker
- My Sister and I (1954), as Christines Vater
- The Gypsy Baron (1954), as Barinkay
- The Beautiful Miller (1954), as Albert Krügler
- Bruder Martin (1954), as Bruder Martin
- Schützenliesel (1954), as Kaspar
- A Parisian in Rome (1954), as Professor Roth
- Victoria in Dover (1954), as Prof. Landmann
- Baron Tzigane (1954), as Barinkay
- Secrets of the City (1955), as Herbert Klein
- The Blue Danube (1955), as Schröder
- Marriage Sanitarium (1955), as Professor Thomas Eschenburg
- One Woman Is Not Enough? (1955), as Spielwaren-Ladenbesitzer Schratt
- Die Deutschmeister (1955), as Kaiser Franz Joseph
- Bandits of the Autobahn (1955), as Vater Heinze
- The Happy Wanderer (1955), as Dr. Peters, Tonis Vater
- My Leopold (1955), as Gottlieb Weigelt
- Du mein stilles Tal (1955), as Herr Kramer
- Die Försterbuben (1955), as Michael Schwarzaug, Gastwirt
- Charley's Aunt (1956), as August Sallmann
- Bademeister Spargel (1956), as Engelbert Spargel
- And Who Is Kissing Me? (1956), as Bauer
- Lügen haben hübsche Beine (1956)
- Hilfe - sie liebt mich (1956), as Brösel, Angestellter bei "Tourist"
- Lumpaci the Vagabond (1956), as August Knieriem, Schuster
- Her Corporal (1956), as Gottfried Lampl
- Was die Schwalbe sang (1956), as Philipp Meyen
- Das Donkosakenlied (1956), as Professor Hartmann
- Manöverball (1956), as Erzherzog Roderich
- Die Christel von der Post (1956), as Ferdinand Brenneis, Hotelbesitzer
- Der schräge Otto (1957), as Vater Müller
- The Winemaker of Langenlois (1957), as Korbinian Grammelshuber, Verwalter
- … und die Liebe lacht dazu (1957), as Graf Ferdinand von Ausberg
- Ober, zahlen! (1957), as Gustav Prebichl
- Lemke's Widow (1957), as Fürst Ludwig
- Hoch droben auf dem Berg (1957), as Ferdinand Broneder
- Der schönste Tag meines Lebens (1957), as Direktor
- Heimweh … dort, wo die Blumen blühn (1957), as Abt
- Vienna, City of My Dreams (1957), as Vater Lehnert
- Candidates for Marriage (1958), as Ferdinand Haslinger
- Hello Taxi (1958), as Franz Schwarzl
- Hoch klingt der Radetzkymarsch (1958), as Generalfeldmarschall Radetzky
- Sebastian Kneipp (1958), as Erzherzog Joseph
- Heimat – Deine Lieder (1959), as Heimleiter
- Sabine und die 100 Männer (1960), as Schulz
- Kauf dir einen bunten Luftballon (1961), as Professor Engelbert
- … und du mein Schatz bleibst hier (1961), as Berger
- Der Orgelbauer von St. Marien (1961), as Franz Burgmann und Josef Burgmann
- Drei Liebesbriefe aus Tirol (1962), as Dr. Franz
- Dance with Me Into the Morning (1962), as Johann Ebeseder
- The Bandit and the Princess (1962), as Der nasse Elias
- Die lustigen Vagabunden (1962), as George
- Don't Fool with Me (1963), as Raimund Valentin
- Our Crazy Nieces (1963), as Franz Eierlein
- Im singenden Rößl am Königssee (1963), as Amtsgerichtsrat Zwicker
- Ferien vom Ich (1963), as Blümchen
- Die ganze Welt ist himmelblau (1964), as Mr. Muckenhuber
- I Learned It from Father (1964), as Julius Knackert
- The Great Skate (1964), as Franz Haslinger
- Happy-End am Attersee (1964), as Severin Petermann
- Der Alpenkönig und der Menschenfeind (1965), as Astragalus
- Call of the Forest (1965), as Gustl Wegrainer
- Das ist mein Wien (1965)
- Sie nannten ihn Krambambuli (1972), as Xaver Doppler

== Awards ==
- State actor (Staatsschauspieler) (1942)
- Decoration of Honour in Gold for Services to the Republic of Austria (1964)
- Medal of the Austrian capital Vienna (1964)
- Kammerschauspieler (1969)
- Film Award for many years of excellent work in the German film industry (1969)
- Girardi Ring (1972)
- Austrian Cross of Honour for Science and Art, 1st class (1974)
- Honorary Ring of Vienna (1977)
- Nestroy Ring (1980)
