= Richard Eybner =

Austrian actor

- Born: 17 March 1896; St. Pölten, Lower Austria; Austria-Hungary
- Died: 20 June 1986 (aged 90); Vienna, Austria
- Resting place: Döbling Cemetery
- Occupation: Film actor
- Years active: 1931–1983

Richard Eybner (3 March 1896 – 20 June 1986) was an Austrian actor at the theatre and in films.

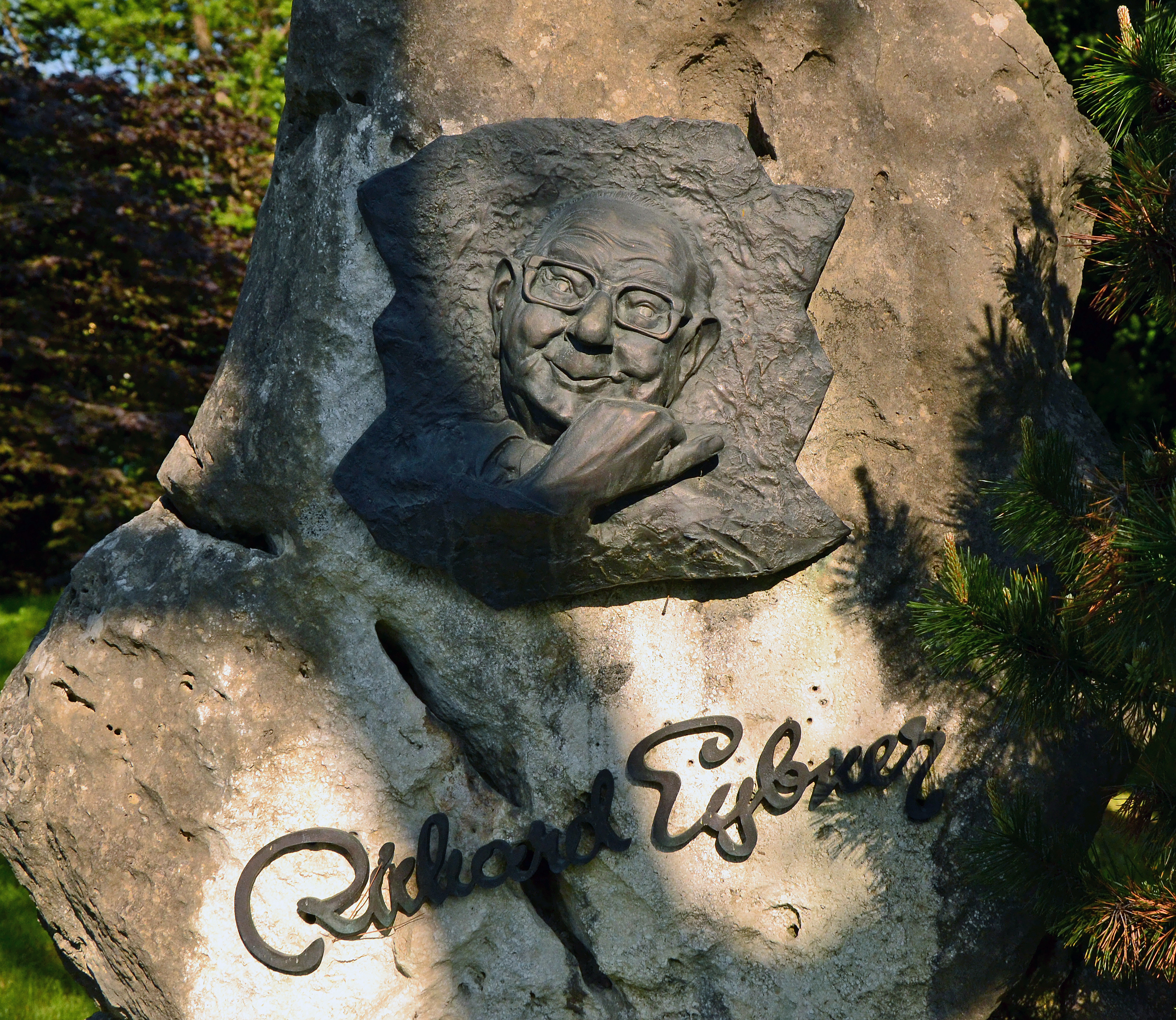
Richard Eybner's grave at Döbling Cemetery in Vienna

== Selected filmography ==
- Purpur und Waschblau (1931) - Kabinettsrat Traunstadt
- Die große Liebe (1931)
- When You're Young, the World Belongs to You (1934) - Theaterdirektor
- Spring Parade (1934) - Ein Komiteeherr (uncredited)
- Peter (1934) - Party guest
- Little Mother (1935) - Philips
- Dance Music (1935) - Inhaber einer Tanzschule
- Es flüstert die Liebe (1935) - Monsieur Cochard
- Immortal Melodies (1935) - Der Ballettmeister
- The Postman from Longjumeau (1936) - Marquis de Corcy
- Fräulein Lilli (1936) - Van Eyben
- Hannerl and Her Lovers (1936)
- Lumpaci the Vagabond (1936) - Baptiste
- Premiere (1937) - Mucky
- Sein letztes Modell (1937) - Der Richter
- Finale (1938)
- Ihr Leibhusar (1938) - Baron Kopereczky
- Thirteen Chairs (1938) - Oskar (uncredited)
- Grenzfeuer (1939)
- I Am Sebastian Ott (1939) - Schmiedl
- Beloved Augustin (1940) - Graf Trautenberg
- Thrice Wed (1941) - Haushofmeister
- Wir bitten zum Tanz (1941) - Neufingerl
- Whom the Gods Love (1942) - Baron von Gemmingen
- Two Happy People (1943)
- Die kluge Marianne (1943)
- The White Dream (1943) - Scherzinger
- Reisebekanntschaft (1943) - Herr Gillberg
- Wie ein Dieb in der Nacht (1945) - Chef
- Liebe nach Noten (1947) - Hampel
- Ein Mann gehört ins Haus (1948)
- The Mozart Story (1948) - Baron Gemmingen
- Eroica (1949) - Schuppanzigh
- Kiss Me Casanova (1949) - Ballet Master
- Höllische Liebe (1949) - Samuel Minister
- Der Seelenbräu (1950) - Höherer Schulbeamter, Vorgesetzter von Franz Haindl (uncredited)
- Kind der Donau (1950)
- Der Fünf-Minuten-Vater (1951) - James the Butler
- Vienna Waltzes (1951) - Haslinger
- Das Herz einer Frau (1951)
- Valentins Sündenfall (1951)
- Zwei in einem Auto (1951) - Autoverkäufer
- Hello Porter (1952) - Professor Ruhmann
- Season in Salzburg (1952) - Gendermarie-Inspektor
- Starfish (1952) - Finanzminister von Vineta
- Annaluise and Anton (1953) - Kellner im Café 'Sommerlatte' (uncredited)
- Franz Schubert (1953) - Hoftheatersekretär
- Schicksal am Lenkrad (1954) - Kom.Rat. Felix Kestranek
- Der Komödiant von Wien (1954)
- Three Men in the Snow (1955) - Herr Heltai
- Die Deutschmeister (1955) - Gustav Knoll
- Die Wirtin zur Goldenen Krone (1955) - Friedrich, Kellner
- Sissi (1955) - Postmeister von Ischl
- And Who Is Kissing Me? (1956) - Prof. Hecht
- Wilhelm Tell (1956) - Söldner Leuthold
- Lumpazivagabundus (1956)
- Sissi: The Young Empress (1956) - Postmeister
- Scherben bringen Glück (1957) - Ein Standesbeamter
- Der schönste Tag meines Lebens (1957) - Präfekt Keppler
- Eva küßt nur Direktoren (1958) - Graupinger, Polizeikommissar
- Eva (1958)
- Big Request Concert (1960) - Prof. Warwenka
- Gustav Adolf's Page (1960) - Seni
- Forever My Love (1962) - (uncredited)
- The Spendthrift (1964) - Johann, Bedienter
- When the Grapevines Bloom on the Danube (1965) - Diener Ferdinand
