= Peter (1934 film) =

1934 film by Henry Koster

- Directed by: Henry Koster
- Written by: Sándor Nádas (play); Felix Jackson; Johann von Vásáry
- Produced by: Joe Pasternak
- Starring: Franciska Gaal; Felix Bressart; Richard Eybner
- Cinematography: István Eiben
- Edited by: Viktor Gertler
- Music by: Nicholas Brodszky
- Production companies: Hunnia Filmstúdió; Universal Pictures
- Distributed by: Universal Pictures
- Release date: 20 December 1934
- Running time: 85 minutes
- Countries: Austria; Hungary
- Language: German

Peter is a 1934 Austrian-Hungarian comedy film directed by Henry Koster and starring Franciska Gaal, Felix Bressart and Richard Eybner.

== Plot ==
After a young woman and her grandfather run into financial trouble, she (forced by a thief to wear his clothes) tries to earn money selling newspapers, loudly yelling false news to advertise them.

A young doctor arguing that "truth is the mothermilk of the civilisation", destroys the newspapers and tries to leave in his car, but is blocked by her, causing him to destroy a telephone booth.

Arrested still wearing the thief's male clothes with his wig found in the trouser pocket, she and grandfather are dragged in front of an understanding but severe judge who make them to pay for the telephone booth.

The doctor, moved by the tears for having caused trouble for the 'boy' and her grandfather, asks his garage manager to hire 'him' and secretly pays the fine.

When she discovers the doctor has no clients, she starts helping him find some in daring ways. The doctor discovers she is not a boy, but continues the charade. There is a happy ending when she finds out he has secretly helped her and her grandfather.

== Production ==
The film was made by German-based subsidiary of the American studios Universal Pictures, whom Gaal was under contract to. The rise of the Nazi Party mean that Gaal could no longer work in Germany, so production of her films were switched to Vienna and Budapest.

Its plot was drawn from a stage play by Sándor Nádas. It was made at the Hunnia Film Studios in Budapest. The film's sets were designed by art director Márton Vincze. Josef von Báky, later a leading director, worked as assistant director on the film.

== Cast ==
- Franciska Gaal as 17-year-old Eva
- Felix Bressart as Eva's grandfather
- Richard Eybner as a party guest
- Hans Jaray as Doctor Robert Bandler
- Sigurd Lohde as a police officer
- Grete Natzler as Mary
- Anton Pointner as Steffani
- Hans Richter as Hobby, an apprentice
- Imre Ráday as a thief
- Ludwig Rüth as Panne
- Etha von Storm
- Otto Wallburg as Mr. Zöllner, a garage-owner

== Bibliography ==
- Hans-Michael Bock and Tim Bergfelder. The Concise Cinegraph: An Encyclopedia of German Cinema. Berghahn Books.
