= Franciska Gaal =

Hungarian cabaret artist and film actress (1903–1972)

- Franciska Gaal
- Born: Franciska Silberspitz; 1 February 1903; Budapest, Austro-Hungarian Empire
- Died: 13 August 1972 (aged 69); New York City, US
- Other names: Szidónia Silberspitz; Fanny Zilverstitch
- Occupation: Actress
- Years active: 1921–1946 (film)
- Spouse(s): Sándor Lestyán (1922–?); Francis Dajkovich (1934–1965) (his death)

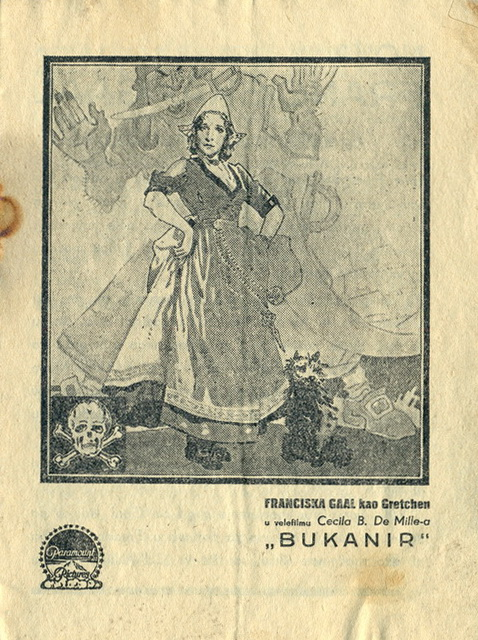
1940, Franciska Gaal as Gretchen on original program for movie The Buccaneer, playing in a local cinema in Prilep, Macedonia (Kingdom of Yugoslavia)

Franciska Gaal (born Franciska Silberspitz, 1 February 1903 – 13 August 1972) was a Hungarian cabaret artist and film actress of Jewish heritage. Gaal starred in a popular series of European romantic comedies during the 1930s. After attracting interest in Hollywood she moved there and made three films.

== Early years ==
Born on 1 February 1903 in Budapest, Gaal was the last of the 13 children of a Jewish family. She studied at the Stage Academy in Budapest in 1919, and by 1920, she appeared in theaters in this city.

== Early career ==
Gaal debuted in film in Máté gazda és a törpék (1919). She was groomed by Joe Pasternak as a singer to become a popular stage and cabaret performer in Central Europe in the 1920s and 1930s. She made her first film appearances in some Hungarian silent films of the early 1920s, but her cinema career didn't ignite until the arrival of sound film.

== Hollywood ==
After appearing in several films made in Hungary, Germany and Austria, two of which were directed by Henry Koster, she came to Hollywood to star in Cecil B. De Mille's epic adventure film The Buccaneer (1938). She followed this with the comedy The Girl Downstairs (also 1938) with Franchot Tone, a remake of her Austrian success Catherine the Last. In 1939, Gaal co-starred with Bing Crosby in the musical Paris Honeymoon.

== Later life ==
She returned to Hungary in 1940 for unknown reasons and remained there for the duration of World War II.

In 1946, she began work on the Soviet-backed Renee XIV with Johannes Heesters and Theo Lingen, but filming was halted during production and never was completed. She returned to the United States in 1947 with her husband Francis de Dajkovich (died in 1965), a Budapest-born attorney, but her return attracted little interest in Hollywood. In 1951, she replaced Eva Gabor in The Happy Time on Broadway.

== Death ==
Gaal died of thrombosis in New York City.

== Filmography ==
Year	Title	Role	Notes
1920	A bostonville-i kaland		
1921	New-York express kábel	Reporter	
1921	A cornevillei harangok	Serpolette, cselédlány	
1932	Paprika	Ilona von Takacs	
1933	Greetings and Kisses, Veronika	Veronika	
1933	Scandal in Budapest	Eva Balogh	
1933	Romance in Budapest	Eva Balogh	
1934	A Precocious Girl	Lucie Carell, nicknamed Csibi	
1934	Spring Parade	Marika	
1934	Peter	17-year old Eva	
1935	Little Mother	Marie Bonnard	
1936	Catherine the Last	Katharina, Küchenmädchen	
1936	Fräulein Lilli	Fräulein Lilli	
1938	The Buccaneer	Gretchen	
1938	The Girl Downstairs	Katerina Linz	
1939	Paris Honeymoon	Manya	
1946	Renee XIV		uncompleted

== Bibliography ==
- Bock, Hans-Michael & Bergfelder, Tim. The Concise CineGraph. Encyclopedia of German Cinema. Berghahn Books, 2009.
