= S. Z. Sakall =

Hungarian actor (1883–1955)

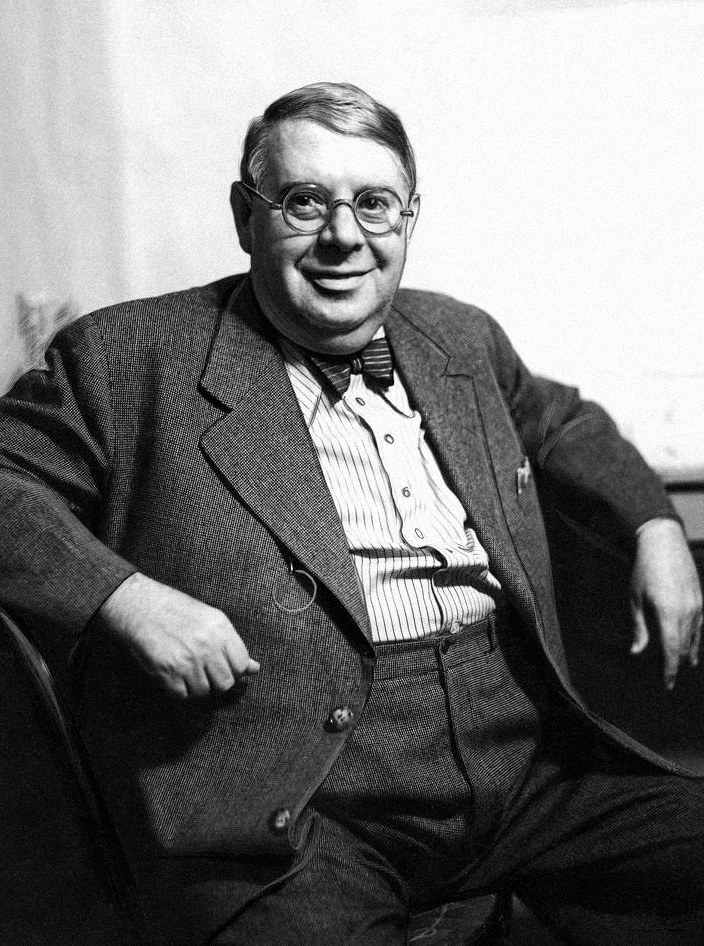
- Sakall in 1937
- Born: Jakab Grünwald; February 2, 1883; Budapest, Austria-Hungary (present-day Budapest, Hungary)
- Died: February 12, 1955 (aged 72); Los Angeles, California, U.S.
- Resting place: Forest Lawn Memorial Park, Glendale
- Other names: S.Z. "Cuddles" Sakall; Szőke Szakáll; Gerő Jenő; Jacob Gerő; Jacob Gero; Grünwald Jakab; Gärtner Sándor
- Occupation: Actor
- Years active: 1916–1954
- Spouses: Giza Grossner (m. 1916; died 1918) Anne Kardos (m. 1920)

Szőke Szakáll (born Jakab Grünwald, other names: Gärtner Sándor and Gerő Jenő; February 2, 1883 – February 12, 1955), known in the English-speaking world as S. Z. Sakall, was a Hungarian-American stage and film character actor. He appeared in many prominent movies, including Casablanca (1942), in which he played Carl, the head waiter; Christmas in Connecticut (1945); In the Good Old Summertime (1949); and Lullaby of Broadway (1951). Sakall played numerous supporting roles in 'classic' type Hollywood productions including musicals and other films of the 1940s and 1950s. His rotund body type and overall cuteness, coupled with his caring personal character, caused studio magnate Jack L. Warner to bestow on Sakall the affectionate nickname "Cuddles".

Besides his unique moniker, by which he was "known throughout the movie business", Sakall also earned a reputation as one of the "stalwart character-acting veterans" of his day, particularly given his "choice", "significant role" in Casablanca. That garnered his performing skills lasting praise despite his "brief" involvement in the movie's storyline. Author and media analyst Harlan Lebo of the University of Southern California later noted Sakall's "bubbly" and "colorful" nature on screen in the book Casablanca: Behind the Scenes.

== Early life and career ==
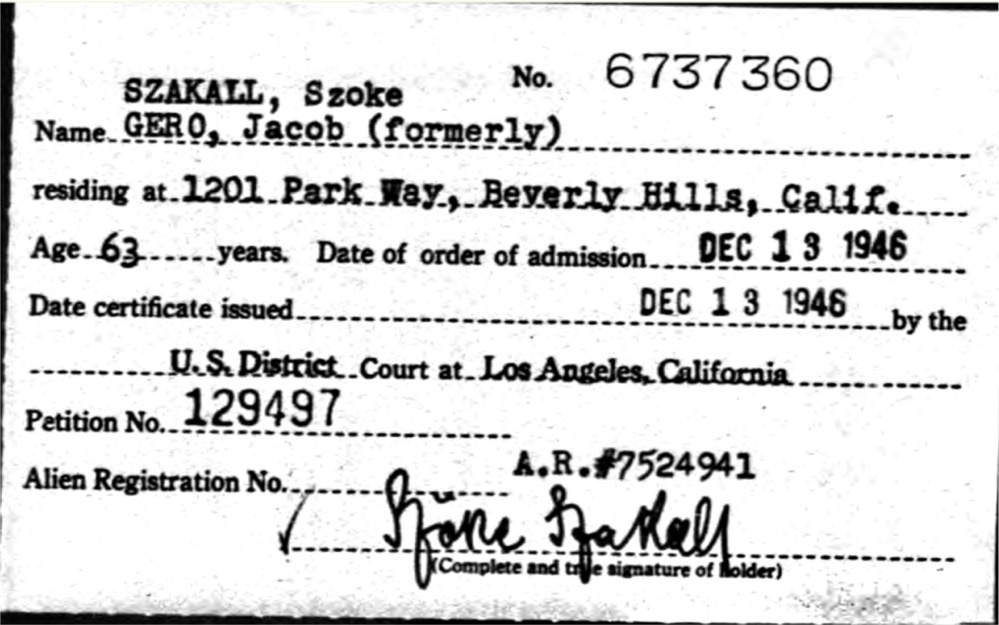
US Naturalization index record of SZ Sakall

Gerő Jenő (later transcribed in English as Jacob Gero) was born in Budapest to a Jewish family. A sculptor's son, he was invalided out of the Hungarian army in World War I after receiving a wound in the chest from a Russian bayonet. During his schooldays, he wrote sketches for Budapest vaudeville shows under the pen name Szőke Szakáll, meaning "blond beard", in reference to his own beard, grown to make him look older, which he affected when, at the age of 18, he turned to acting. In 1946, he became a United States citizen under the name of Jacob Gero (aka Szőke Szakáll).

The actor became a star of the Hungarian stage and screen in the 1910s and 1920s. At the beginning of the 1920s he moved to Vienna, where he appeared in Hermann Leopoldi's Kabarett Leopoldi-Wiesenthal. In the 1930s he was, next to Hans Moser, the most significant representative of Wiener Film, the Viennese light romantic comedy genre. He also appeared in Berlin. He appeared in Familientag im Hause Prellstein (1927), Ihre Majestät die Liebe (1929, which was remade in Hollywood as Her Majesty, Love, with W.C. Fields in Sakall's role) and Two Hearts in Waltz Time (1930). For a brief period during this time, he ran his own production company.

== Return to and emigration from Hungary ==
When the Nazis came to power in Germany in 1933, Sakall was forced to return to Hungary. He was involved in over 40 movies in his native land. When Hungary joined the Axis in 1940, he left for Hollywood with his wife. Many of Sakall's close relatives were later murdered in Nazi concentration camps, including all three of his sisters and a niece, as well as his wife's brother and sister.

== Hollywood ==
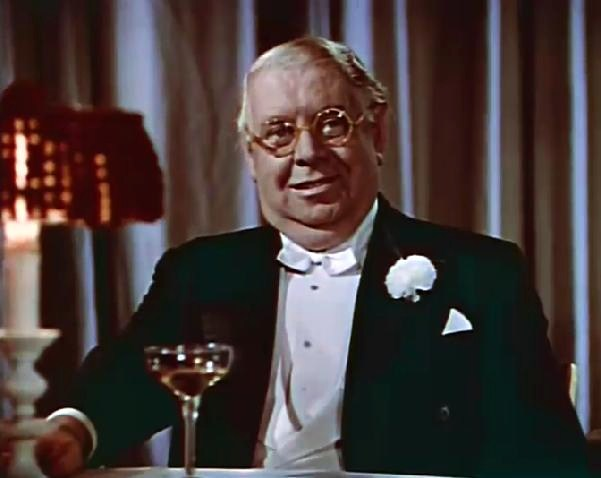
S. Z. Sakall in That Night in Rio (1941)

Sakall began a Hollywood career that included "an endless succession of excitable theatrical impresarios, lovable European uncles and befuddled shopkeepers". His first American film role was in the comedy It's a Date (1940) with Deanna Durbin. The first big hit of his American career was Ball of Fire (1941) with Gary Cooper and Barbara Stanwyck. Later, he signed a contract with Warner Bros., where he had a number of other small or brief supporting roles, including one in Yankee Doodle Dandy (1942) with James Cagney.

Later the same year, at the age of 59, he portrayed his best remembered character, Carl the head waiter in Casablanca (1942). Producer Hal B. Wallis signed Sakall for the role three weeks after filming had begun. When he was first offered the part, Sakall hated it and turned it down. Sakall finally agreed to take the role provided they gave him four weeks of work. The two sides eventually agreed on three weeks. He received $1,750 per week for a total of $5,250. He actually had more screen time than either Peter Lorre or Sydney Greenstreet.

Sakall appeared in 30 additional movies, including Christmas in Connecticut (1945), reuniting with Barbara Stanwyck. He also appeared with Errol Flynn in 1945 in the movie San Antonio where he uttered the phrase, "People are the craziest animals". Sakall appeared in four films released in 1948: the drama Embraceable You, followed by April Showers, Michael Curtiz's Romance on the High Seas (Doris Day's film debut), and Whiplash. He was in four top movies in 1949. First Sakall played Felix Hofer in Doris Day's second film, My Dream Is Yours. Later that year, he supported June Haver and Ray Bolger in Look for the Silver Lining. Next, he played Otto Oberkugen in In the Good Old Summertime, with Judy Garland and Van Johnson – this was a musical remake of Ernst Lubitsch's The Shop Around the Corner (1940). Finally, Sakall was given the principal role of songwriter Fred Fisher in Oh, You Beautiful Doll, though top billing went to June Haver.

Sakall appeared in nine more movies during the 1950s, two of them musicals with Doris Day, playing J. Maxwell Bloomhaus in Tea for Two (1950) and Adolph Hubbell in Lullaby of Broadway (1951). His other roles included Poppa Schultz in the Errol Flynn western Montana (1950); Miklos Teretzky in the June Haver musical The Daughter of Rosie O'Grady (also 1950); Don Miguel in the Randolph Scott western Sugarfoot; Uncle Felix in the musical Painting the Clouds with Sunshine (1951) with Virginia Mayo, and one of the episodes in the movie It's a Big Country (also 1951) featuring Gene Kelly, Van Johnson, Gary Cooper, Janet Leigh, Fredric March and Ethel Barrymore. His last movie was The Student Prince (1954).

== Death ==
Sakall died of a heart attack in Hollywood on February 12, 1955, shortly after filming The Student Prince, ten days after his 72nd birthday. He is buried in the Garden of Memory in Forest Lawn Memorial Park in Glendale, California.

== Partial filmography ==
Complete credits from 1940 on.

- Az újszülött apa (1916)
- A dollárnéni (1917)
- Professor Imhof (1926) as Dr. Hecht
- The Master of Death (1926) as Bordoni
- Hello Caesar! (1927, written)
- Heaven on Earth (1927) as Geschäftsführer
- Family Gathering in the House of Prellstein (1927) as Sami Bambus
- Da hält die Welt den Atem an (1928) as Theaterdirektor
- Mary Lou (1928) as Der Jongleur
- Whirl of Youth (1928) as Sam, ein Artist
- Pavement Butterfly (1929) as Paul Bennet – Maler
- The Merry Farmer (1927) as Dorfpolizist
- Why Cry at Parting? (1929) as Gottgetreu, Kassierer von Harder & Co.
- Two Hearts in Waltz Time, originally titled Zwei Herzen im ¾ Takt or Zwei Herzen im Dreiviertel Takt (1930) as Der Theaterdirektor
- Twice Married (1930) as Grafenberg's brother-in-law
- Rendezvous (1930) as Crepin
- Susanne Cleans Up (1930) as Dr. Fuchs, juristischer Berater
- The Jumping Jack (1930) as Eickmeyer – Parfümfabrikant
- Her Majesty the Barmaid (1931) as Bela Török / Lias Vater
- Headfirst into Happiness (1931) as Baron Monteuil
- Die Faschingsfee (1931) as Matthias, Diener
- Ihr Junge (1931)
- Walzerparadies (1931) as Schwartz, Theateragent
- Ich heirate meinen Mann (1931) as Adolphe
- Der Stumme von Portici (1931) as Ehemann
- The Squeaker (1931) as Bill "Billy" Anerley
- My Cousin from Warsaw (1931) as Burel, Lucienne's spouse
- The Woman They Talk About (1931) as Salewski Moretti
- The Soaring Maiden (1931) as Onkel Lampe
- The Unknown Guest (1931) as Leopold Kuhlmann
- Girls to Marry (1932) as Alois Novak
- Melody of Love (1932) as Bernhard
- I Do Not Want to Know Who You Are (1932) as Ottokar
- Countess Mariza (1932) as Lampe
- Overnight Sensation (1932) as Haase
- Tokajerglut (1933) as Schmidt, Pressephotograph
- A City Upside Down (1933) as Der Bürgermeister
- The Emperor's Waltz (1933) as Leitner – Fabrikant aus Budapest
- A Woman Like You (1933) as Theobald Roehn, Fabrikant
- Es war einmal ein Musikus (1933) as Häberlein
- Must We Get Divorced? (1933) as Professor Friedrich Hornung
- Grand Duchess Alexandra (1933) as Dimitri, Chefkoch im Hause der Großfürstin
- Romance in Budapest (1933) as Strangel úr, Murray menedzsere
- Adventures on the Lido (1933) as Michael
- Scandal in Budapest (1933) as Stangl
- Voices of Spring (1933) as Krüger, Schuldiener
- Stolen Wednesday (1933) as Schmidz, fotóriporter
- Wenn du jung bist, gehört dir die Welt (1934) as Beppo
- Everything for the Woman (1934)
- Helyet az öregeknek (1934) as Polgár stationer
- Ende schlecht, alles gut (1934) as Anton Polgar, Stationery Shop Owner
- Bretter, die die Welt bedeuten (1935) as Franz Novak
- Viereinhalb Musketiere (1935) as Sattler, drummer
- Tagebuch der Geliebten (1935) as Dr. Walitzky
- Il diario di una donna amata (1935)
- Barátságos arcot kérek (1936) as Blazsek Mátyás photographer
- Fräulein Lilli (1936) as Prokurist Seidl
- The Lilac Domino (1937) as Sandor
- Bubi (1937) as Moller
- It's a Date (1940) as Karl Ober
- Florian (1940) as Max
- My Love Came Back (1940) as Geza Peyer
- Spring Parade (1940) as Latislav Teschek – the Baker
- The Man Who Lost Himself (1941) as Paul
- The Devil and Miss Jones (1941) as George
- That Night in Rio (1941) as Penna
- Ball of Fire (1941) as Prof. Magenbruch
- Broadway (1942) as Nick
- Yankee Doodle Dandy (1942) as Schwab
- Seven Sweethearts (1942) as Mr. Van Maaster, the Father
- Casablanca (1942) as Carl, the waiter
- Wintertime (1943) as Hjalmar Ostgaard
- Thank Your Lucky Stars (1943) as Dr. Schlenna
- Shine On, Harvest Moon (1944) as Poppa Carl
- Hollywood Canteen (1944) as Himself (cameo)
- Wonder Man (1945) as Schmidt
- Christmas in Connecticut (1945) as Felix Bassenak
- The Dolly Sisters (1945) as Uncle Latsie Dolly
- San Antonio (1945) as Sacha Bozic
- Cinderella Jones (1946) as Gabriel Popik
- Two Guys from Milwaukee (1946) as Count Oswald
- Never Say Goodbye (1946) as Luigi
- The Time, the Place and the Girl (1946) as Ladislaus Cassel
- Cynthia (1947) as Professor Rosenkrantz
- April Showers (1948) as Mr. Curley
- Romance on the High Seas (1948) as Uncle Lazlo Lazlo
- Embraceable You (1948) as Sammy
- Whiplash (1948) as Sam
- My Dream Is Yours (1949) as Felix Hofer
- Look for the Silver Lining (1949) as Shendorf
- In the Good Old Summertime (1949) as Otto Oberkugen
- Oh, You Beautiful Doll (1949) as Fred Fisher aka Alfred Breitenbach
- Montana (1950) as Papa Otto Schultz
- The Daughter of Rosie O'Grady (1950) as Miklos 'Mike' Teretzky
- Tea for Two (1950) as J. Maxwell Bloomhaus
- Sugarfoot (1951) as Don Miguel Wormser
- Lullaby of Broadway (1951) as Adolph Hubbell
- Painting the Clouds with Sunshine (1951) as Uncle Felix
- It's a Big Country (1951) as Stefan Szabo
- Small Town Girl (1953) as Papa Eric Schlemmer
- The Student Prince (1954) as Joseph Ruder (final film role)

== See also ==
- List of Jewish actors

== Bibliography ==
- Sakall, S. Z. (1954). The Story of Cuddles: My Life under the Emperor Francis Joseph, Adolf Hitler and the Warner Brothers (hardcover). Translated by Tabori, Paul (First ed.). London: Cassell.
