= Paprika (1932 film) =

1932 film directed by Carl Boese

- Directed by: Carl Boese
- Written by: Bobby E. Lüthge
- Based on: Der Sprung in die Ehe, a play by Max Reimann; Otto Schwartz
- Produced by: Alberto Giacalone; Viktor Klein
- Starring: Franciska Gaal; Paul Hörbiger; Paul Heidemann
- Cinematography: Reimar Kuntze
- Edited by: Hilde Grebner
- Music by: Franz Waxman
- Production company: Victor Klein-Film
- Distributed by: Deutsche Universal-Film
- Release date: 4 November 1932
- Running time: 93 minutes
- Country: Germany
- Language: German

Paprika is a 1932 German comedy film directed by Carl Boese and starring Franciska Gaal, Paul Hörbiger and Paul Heidemann. Made by the German branch of Universal Pictures, it was based on a hit play by Max Reimann and Otto Schwartz. A French-language version and an Italian-language version were released the following year. It is also known by the alternative title of Marriage in Haste. In the US, the film was released almost 2 years later in German on 18 May 1934 in the Yorkville theater in New York City under the title Wie man Maenner fesselt (How to Charm Men).

This was the debut film of actress Claire Glib, who was known also for The Yellow Flag (1937) and Robert and Bertram (1939).

It was shot at the Johannisthal Studios in Berlin. The film's sets were designed by the art director Gustav A. Knauer and Walter Reimann.

== Cast ==
- Franciska Gaal as Ilona von Takacs
- Paul Hörbiger as Dr. Paul Schröder
- Paul Heidemann as Dr. Max Schröder
- Liselotte Schaak as Ottis Frau
- Hugo Fischer-Köppe as Franz, Hausdiener
- Margarete Kupfer as Paul Schröders Frau
- Claire Glib as Röschen
- Frigga Braut as Minna, Dienstmädchen
- Hermann Picha as Portier
- Carl Walther Meyer as Schornsteinfeger

== See also ==
- Paprika (1959), West German remake

== Bibliography ==
- Bock, Hans-Michael; Bergfelder, Tim, eds. (2009). The Concise Cinegraph: Encyclopaedia of German Cinema. New York: Berghahn Books. ISBN 978-1-57181-655-9.
- Klaus, Ulrich J. Deutsche Tonfilme: Jahrgang 1932. Klaus-Archiv, 1988. ISBN 978-3-927352-07-0.
