= Catherine the Last =

- Hans Holt and Franciska Gaal
- Directed by: Henry Koster
- Written by: Sándor Hunyady (short story); Károly Nóti; Felix Jackson
- Produced by: Joe Pasternak
- Starring: Franciska Gaal; Hans Holt; Hans Olden; Otto Wallburg
- Cinematography: Theodore J. Pahle
- Edited by: Viktor Gertler
- Music by: Nicholas Brodszky; Hans J. Salter
- Production company: Universal Pictures
- Distributed by: Universal Pictures
- Release date: 30 August 1936
- Country: Austria
- Language: German

Catherine the Last (German: Katharina, die Letzte) is a 1936 Austrian romantic comedy film directed by Henry Koster and starring Franciska Gaal, Hans Holt and Hans Olden. It was made by the Austrian subsidiary of Universal Pictures. The film's sets were designed by the art director Erwin Scharf. After making the film, Koster moved to Hollywood] In 1938, the film was remade in America as The Girl Downstairs with Gaal reprising her role.

== Synopsis ==
After Hans is frustrated in his attempts to see his girlfriend Sybill by her overprotective father, who is a business tycoon father, he attempts to gain entry into the house by romancing the family's kitchen maid. At first, he simply uses her as a ruse, but he eventually falls in love with her.

== Cast ==
- Franciska Gaal as Katharina, Kitchen maid
- Hans Holt as Hans von Gerstikow
- Hans Olden as Eduard, Hans' friend
- Otto Wallburg as Sixtus Braun, Big industrialist
- Dorothy Poole as Sybill Braun
- Eduard Linkers as Steinschneider, Braun's secretary
- Ernő Verebes as Tobby, Hans' servant
- Adrienne Gessner as Berta, cook
- Fritz Imhoff as Bubs, car salesman
- Adolf E. Licho as Excellency
- Georg Schmieter as Fireman
- Sigurd Lohde as Police inspector
- Comedian Harmonists as Themselves
- Paul Morgan as Stephan, waiter

== Bibliography ==
- Bock, Hans-Michael & Bergfelder, Tim. The Concise CineGraph. Encyclopedia of German Cinema. Berghahn Books, 2009.
