= Terror of the Garrison =

1931 film directed by Carl Boese

- Directed by: Carl Boese
- Written by: Bobby E. Lüthge; Károly Nóti
- Starring: Felix Bressart; Lucie Englisch; Adele Sandrock
- Cinematography: Hans Karl Gottschalk; Willy Hameister
- Music by: Artur Guttmann
- Production company: Aco-Film
- Distributed by: Albö-Film
- Release date: 24 April 1931
- Running time: 86 minutes
- Country: Germany
- Language: German

Terror of the Garrison (German: Der Schrecken der Garnison) is a 1931 German comedy film directed by Carl Boese and starring Felix Bressart, Lucie Englisch and Adele Sandrock.

It was one of several military farces directed by Boese in the early 1930s.

== Cast ==
- Felix Bressart as Musketier Kulicke
- Lucie Englisch as Antonie Bock
- Adele Sandrock as Erbprinzessin Adelheid
- Tamara Desni as Annemarie
- Olga Limburg as Institutsvorsteherin
- Albert Paulig as Major
- Kurt Vespermann as Leutnant Schmidt
- Heinrich Fuchs as Leutnant von Prittwitz
- Ernst Behmer as Stabsarzt
- Fritz Spira as von Nachtigall
- Gaston Briese as von Witte
- Hugo Fischer-Köppe as Wachtmeister Brennecke
- Karl Harbacher as Bock - Photograph

== Bibliography ==
- Bock, Hans-Michael & Bergfelder, Tim. The Concise Cinegraph: Encyclopaedia of German Cinema. Berghahn Books, 2009.
