= Sigurd Lohde =

German actor

- Born: 4 June 1899; Weimar, German Empire
- Died: 22 July 1977 (aged 78); Bad Sooden-Allendorf, West Germany
- Occupation: Actor
- Years active: 1931-1970 (film)

Sigurd Lohde (1899–1977) was a German film and television actor.

== Selected filmography ==
- The Daredevil (1931)
- The Leap into the Void (1932)
- Mrs. Lehmann's Daughters (1932)
- Theodor Körner (1932)
- Tannenberg (1932)
- The Big Bluff (1933)
- Peter (1934)
- Little Mother (1935)
- Catherine the Last (1936)
- The Bath in the Barn (1956)
- Beloved Corinna (1956)
- And That on Monday Morning (1959)

== Bibliography ==
- Youngkin, Stephen. The Lost One: A Life of Peter Lorre. University Press of Kentucky, 2005.
