= Spring Parade =

1940 film by Henry Koster, Felix Jackson

- Theatrical release poster
- Directed by: Henry Koster
- Screenplay by: Bruce Manning; Felix Jackson
- Story by: Ernst Marischka
- Produced by: Joe Pasternak
- Starring: Deanna Durbin
- Cinematography: Joseph A. Valentine
- Edited by: Bernard W. Burton
- Music by: Hans J. Salter (uncredited)
- Production company: Universal Studios
- Distributed by: Universal Studios
- Release date: September 27, 1940
- Running time: 89 minutes
- Country: United States
- Language: English
- Budget: over $950,000
- Box office: over $2 million

Spring Parade is a 1940 American musical comedy film directed by Henry Koster and starring Deanna Durbin. It is a remake of the 1934 film.

== Plot ==
Based on a story by Ernst Marischka, the film is about a Hungarian woman who attends a Viennese fair and buys a card from a gypsy fortune teller which says she will meet someone important and is destined for a happy marriage. Soon after the woman gets a job as a baker's assistant and meets a handsome army drummer who dreams of becoming a famous composer and conductor, but is held back by the military which discourages original music. Wanting to help the army drummer, the woman sends one of his waltzes to the Austrian Emperor with his weekly order of pastries, which leads to the tuneful and joyous fulfillment of the gypsy's prediction.

== Cast ==
- Deanna Durbin as Ilonka Tolnay
- Robert Cummings as Corporal Harry Marten
- Mischa Auer as Gustav
- Henry Stephenson as Emperor Franz Joseph
- S. Z. Sakall as Laci Teschek - the Baker
- Billy Lenhart as Max
- Kenneth Brown as Moritz
- Walter Catlett as Headwaiter
- Anne Gwynne as Jenny
- Allyn Joslyn as Count Zorndorf
- Peggy Moran as Archduchess Irene
- Reginald Denny as The Major
- John Banner as Cymbalist (uncredited)
- Stanley Blystone as Detective (uncredited)
- Paul Hurst as Headwaiter (uncredited)

== Production ==
In January 1940 Universal announced Durbin's next film would be Spring Parade. Joe Pasternak called it "a musical of Old Vienna" that was similar to Blossom Time. It was a remake of a film Pasternak had made in 1934.

Cummings was cast in March 1940. Filming took place from 27 May to August 1940.

Koster called it "a lovely picture" although he said Durbin "was getting a little more demanding" during filming. On one occasion they were filming after midnight and Durbin went home because she did not want to work that late. Koster threatened to quit the movie but the two made up.

== Awards ==
The film was nominated for four Academy Awards.

- Best Cinematography (Black-and-White) (Joseph Valentine)
- Best Original Song (Robert Stolz and Gus Kahn, for "Waltzing in the Clouds")
- Best Musical Score (Charles Previn)
- Best Sound Recording (Bernard B. Brown)

Spring Parade received four Academy Award nominations for Best Cinematography, Best Original Song, Best Musical Score, and Best Sound Recording.
