= Greetings and Kisses, Veronika =

1933 film directed by Carl Boese

- German: Gruß und Kuß – Veronika
- Directed by: Carl Boese
- Written by: Kurt Schwabach
- Produced by: Viktor Klein
- Starring: Franciska Gaal; Paul Hörbiger; Otto Wallburg
- Cinematography: Bruno Mondi
- Edited by: Else Baum
- Music by: Franz Waxman
- Production company: Victor Klein-Film
- Release date: 29 August 1933
- Running time: 92 minutes
- Country: Germany
- Language: German

Greetings and Kisses, Veronika (German: Gruß und Kuß – Veronika) is a 1933 German comedy film directed by Carl Boese and starring Franciska Gaal, Paul Hörbiger, and Otto Wallburg. It was shot at the Johannisthal Studios in Berlin. The film's art direction was by Kurt Dürnhöfer and Max Heilbronner. The film's popularity made Gaal an international star. However the rise of the Nazi Party to power meant that the Jewish Gaal had to make her next films in Hungary and Austria.

Franz Waxman's song "Greetings and Kisses, Veronika" written for the film became a major hit and helped boost Waxman's career as a songwriter.

== Cast ==
- Franciska Gaal as Veronika
- Paul Hörbiger as Paul Rainer
- Otto Wallburg as Max Becker
- Hilde Hildebrand as Klara Becker
- Margarete Kupfer as Agathe Bolte
- Kurt Lilien as Emil, Paul Rainers Diener
- Olga Engl as Frau Zschoch
- Ehmi Bessel as Anita
- Erika Glässner as Frau Scharmeister
- Arthur Bergen as Sanitätsrat Scharmeister
- Mária Szepes

== Bibliography ==
- Klaus, Ulrich J. Deutsche Tonfilme: Jahrgang 1933. Klaus-Archiv, 1988.
