= Spring Parade (1934 film) =

1934 film directed by Géza von Bolváry

- German film poster
- German: Frühjahrsparade
- Directed by: Géza von Bolváry
- Written by: Ernst Marischka; Ernst Neubach
- Produced by: Joe Pasternak
- Starring: Paul Hörbiger; Franciska Gaal; Wolf Albach-Retty
- Cinematography: István Eiben
- Edited by: Hermann Haller
- Music by: Robert Stolz
- Production companies: Hunnia Filmstúdió; Deutsche Universal-Film
- Distributed by: Universal Pictures
- Release date: 20 September 1934
- Running time: 93 minutes
- Countries: Austria; Germany; Hungary
- Language: German

Spring Parade (German: Frühjahrsparade, pronounced [ˈfʁyːjaːɐ̯paˌʁaːdə]) is a 1934 comedy film directed by Géza von Bolváry and starring Paul Hörbiger, Franciska Gaal, and Wolf Albach-Retty.

The film was made by the German subsidiary of Universal Pictures to whom Gaal was under contract. However the rise of the Nazi Party to power meant that Gaal and several other Jewish figures involved with the film had to work in Budapest and Vienna. The film's sets were designed by art director Emil Hasler.

In 1940 the film was remade in Hollywood as Spring Parade. The screenwriter Ernst Marischka and producer Joe Pasternak worked on both films.

== Cast ==
- Paul Hörbiger as Kaiser Franz Joseph
- Franciska Gaal as Marika
- Wolf Albach-Retty as Wilhelm August Jurek
- Theo Lingen as Baron Zorndorf
- Adele Sandrock as Countess Burgstätten
- Piri Vaszary as Nanette
- Annie Rosar as Frau Taschlmeier
- Hans Richter as Fritzi
- Anton Pointner as Hauptmann Weber
- Tibor Halmay as Corporal Stadler
- Fritz Imhoff as Sergeant Mittermeier
- Hans Moser as Hairdresser Swoboda
- Richard Eybner as a committee director
- Alfred Neugebauer as Kammerdiener Zimmerl
- Alfred Gerasch
- Hans Homma as Ein Hofrat
- Leo Resnicek
- Otto Schmöle as adjutant
- Richard Waldemar
- Karola Zala

== Bibliography ==
- Von Dassanowsky, Robert. Screening Transcendence: Film Under Austrofascism and the Hollywood Hope, 1933-1938. Indiana University Press, 2018
