= Else Baum =

Austrian film editor

- Occupation: Film editor
- Years active: 1930–1940

Else Baum was an Austrian film editor active from 1930 to 1940.

== Selected filmography ==
- Zwielicht (1940)
- Ein Mädchen geht an Land (1938)
- The Unexcused Hour (1937)
- Schatten der Vergangenheit (1936)
- Der König lächelt – Paris lacht (1936)
- The White Horse Inn (1935)
- ...nur ein Komödiant (1935)
- Die ewige Maske (1935)
- Lockspitzel Asew (1935)
- The Cousin from Nowhere (1934)
- Shock Troop (1934)
- The Lost Valley (1934)
- Gruß und Kuß – Veronika (1933)
- Two Good Comrades (1933)
- There Is Only One Love (1933)
- Honour Among Thieves (1933)
- Sehnsucht 202 (1932)
- Theodor Körner (1932)
- The Company's in Love (1932)
- Reserve hat Ruh (1931)
- Victoria and Her Hussar (1931)
- Geld auf der Straße (1930)
- Die Lindenwirtin (1930)
