= Stolen Wednesday =

1933 film

- Directed by: Viktor Gertler
- Written by: József Daróczy; Károly Nóti; Miklós Vitéz
- Produced by: József Daróczy; Eugen Kürschner
- Starring: Kálmán Rózsahegyi; S.Z. Sakall; Steven Geray
- Cinematography: Herbert Körner; István Somkúti
- Music by: Mihály Nádor
- Production company: Phõnix Film
- Release date: 29 December 1933
- Running time: 86 minutes
- Country: Hungary
- Language: Hungarian

Stolen Wednesday (Hungarian: Az ellopott szerda) is a 1933 Hungarian romantic comedy film directed by Viktor Gertler and starring Kálmán Rózsahegyi, S.Z. Sakall and Steven Geray. It was a Multiple-language version, common during the early sound era, with a separate German-language film Tokajerglut also produced.

== Cast ==
- Kálmán Rózsahegyi as Simon, földbirtokos
- Eta Hajdú as Anna, Simon lánya
- S.Z. Sakall as Schmidz, fotóriporter
- Steven Geray as Tamás István, rádióriporter
- Erna Rubinstein as Éva, Simon másik lánya
- Miklós Hajmássy as Rohr, berlini szappangyáros
- Gusztáv Pártos as Moll úr, berlini fõszerkesztõ
- Zoltán Makláry as Szerkesztõségi szolga
- Béla Mihályffi as Magánnyomozói iroda fõnöke
- László Keleti as Az iroda alkalmazottja
- Gyula Justh as Udvard község bírája
- Edit Szász as Cseléd
- György Hajnal as Táncoló statiszta
- Ferenc Hoykó as Pincér
- Irma Lányi as Statiszta a szállodában
- Dezsõ Pártos as Pincér

== Bibliography ==
- Bock, Hans-Michael & Bergfelder, Tim. The Concise CineGraph. Encyclopedia of German Cinema. Berghahn Books, 2009.
- Balski, Grzegorz . Directory of Eastern European Film-makers and Films 1945-1991. Flicks Books, 1992.
- Juhász, István. Kincses magyar filmtár 1931-1944: az eredeti forgatókönyvből 1931 és 1944 között létrejött hazai mozgóképekről. Kráter, 2007.
- Rîpeanu, Bujor. (ed.) International Directory of Cinematographers, Set- and Costume Designers in Film: Hungary (from the beginnings to 1988). Saur, 1981.
