= A Precocious Girl =

1934 Austrian comedy film

- Directed by: Max Neufeld; Richard Eichberg
- Written by: Jacques Théry (play); Régis Gignoux (play); Felix Jackson; Károly Nóti; Richard Eichberg
- Produced by: Joe Pasternak
- Starring: Franciska Gaal; Leopoldine Konstantin; Herbert Hübner
- Cinematography: Georg Bruckbauer; Willy Goldberger
- Edited by: Laslo Benedek
- Music by: Nicholas Brodszky
- Production company: Deutsche Universal-Film
- Distributed by: Deutsche Universal-Film
- Release date: 2 February 1934
- Running time: 84 minutes
- Country: Austria
- Language: German

A Precocious Girl (German title: Csibi, der Fratz aka Früchtchen) is a 1934 Austrian comedy film directed by Max Neufeld and Richard Eichberg and starring Franciska Gaal, Leopoldine Konstantin and Herbert Hübner. The film's sets were designed by art director Julius von Borsody.

The film was made by the German subsidiary of Universal Pictures. Because of the Nazi rise to power Gaal and other Jewish filmmakers went to Austria and Hungary to work on a series of comedy films. A separate Italian version of the story Unripe Fruit was released the same year.

It was remade in Hollywood in 1942 as Between Us Girls, with the setting moved to America.

== Cast ==
- Franciska Gaal as Lucie Carell, nicknamed Csibi
- Leopoldine Konstantin as Maria, her mother
- Herbert Hübner as Hartwig
- Friedl Haerlin as Eva, seine Frau
- Hermann Thimig as Dr. Werner
- Anton Edthofer as Dr. Lohnau
- Tibor Halmay as Berky
- Theo Lingen as Anton, Diener bei Dr. Werner
- Hans Richter as Kurt - ein 14jähriger Junge
- Anton Pointner as Der Herr im Frack
- F.W. Schröder-Schrom as Der Theaterdirektor
- Alfred Neugebauer as Der Bankier
- Margarete Kupfer as Gertrude
- Christl Giampietro as Emma, Lohnaus Schwester
- Helene Lauterböck as Die Vorsteherin des Internats
- Heinz Hanus as Waiter

== See also ==
- Between Us Girls (1942)

== Bibliography ==
- Hans-Michael Bock and Tim Bergfelder. The Concise Cinegraph: An Encyclopedia of German Cinema. Berghahn Books.
