= The Postman from Longjumeau =

- Directed by: Carl Lamac
- Written by: Julia Serda; Karl Peter Gillmann; Charles Amberg
- Produced by: Moritz Grünstein; Ernst Schmid-Arens
- Starring: Carl Esmond; Rose Stradner; Alfred Neugebauer; Thekla Ahrens
- Cinematography: Eduard Hoesch
- Edited by: Else Baum; Erwin Dressler
- Music by: Anton Profes
- Production companies: Atlantis-Film; Thekla-Film
- Distributed by: Hammer-Tonfilm
- Release date: 14 January 1936
- Running time: 95 minutes
- Countries: Austria; Switzerland
- Language: German

The Postman from Longjumeau (German: Der Postillon von Lonjumeau) is a 1936 Austrian-Swiss musical comedy film directed by Carl Lamac and starring Carl Esmond, Rose Stradner and Alfred Neugebauer. The film is known by several alternative titles including Der König lächelt – Paris lacht (The King Smiles – Paris Laughs). It is loosely based on the 1836 opera Le postillon de Lonjumeau by Adolphe Adam. In eighteenth-century France, a Postilion from Longjumeau is summoned by Madame de Pompadour to sing in her opera company, forcing him to be separated from his wife.

== Cast ==
- Carl Esmond – Chapelou, the Postman from Lonjumeau
- Rose Stradner – Madelaine
- Alfred Neugebauer – Louis XV
- Thekla Ahrens – Marquise de Pompadour
- Leo Slezak – Count de Latour
- Lucie Englisch – Lucienne
- Rudolf Carl – Bijou
- Hans Thimig – Pierre Touche, village barber
- Richard Eybner – Marquis de Corcy
- Fritz Imhoff – Mayor
- Joe Furtner – Faviere, Corcy's Secretary
- Tibor Halmay – Ballet Master
- Carl Hauser – Policeman
- Irmgard Alberti – Old Woman with love potion
- Hans-Heinz Bollzmann – Singer
