= I Am Sebastian Ott =

1939 film

- Directed by: Willi Forst
- Written by: Axel Eggebrecht; Eberhard Keindorff
- Produced by: Willi Forst
- Starring: Willi Forst; Gustav Diessl; Trude Marlen
- Cinematography: Carl Hoffmann; Karl Löb
- Edited by: Hans Wolff
- Music by: Theo Mackeben
- Production company: Bavaria Film
- Distributed by: Bavaria Film
- Release date: 11 August 1939
- Running time: 101 minutes
- Country: Germany
- Language: German

I Am Sebastian Ott (German: Ich bin Sebastian Ott) is a 1939 German crime film directed by Willi Forst and starring Forst, Gustav Diessl and Trude Marlen. Some of the film was shot by the assistant director Viktor Becker. It was shot partly at the Sievering Studios in Vienna. It premiered at the Gloria-Palast in Berlin shortly before the outbreak of the Second World War. The film's sets were designed by the art director Kurt Herlth and Werner Schlichting. The plot revolves around art fraud with Forst playing the dual role of twins, one honest and the other corrupt.

== Cast ==
- Willi Forst as Sebastian Ott / Ludwig Ott
- Gustav Diessl as Strobl
- Trude Marlen as Erika
- Paul Hörbiger as Kriminalrat Baumann
- Ady Berber as Meinhardt, Ganove
- Lorenz Corvinus as Geheimrat bei der Ausstellung
- Felix Dombrowsky as Kriminalkommissar
- Richard Eybner as Schmiedl
- Pepi Glöckner-Kramer as Marie, Mädchen bei Holzapfel
- Hanns Hitzinger as Justizrat Norden
- Reinhold Häussermann as Professor Nissen
- Eduard Köck as Eberle, Faktoturn in der Galerie Ott
- Ferdinand Mayerhofer as Kriminalkommissar Hellriegl
- Alfred Neugebauer as Dr. Nemetz, Kriminalrat in Prag
- Fritz Puchstein as Sekretär
- Johannes Roth as Kellner
- Werner Scharf as Paolini
- Wilhelm Schich as Schneider
- Otto Storm as Bankdirektor
- Otto Treßler as Oberst Holzapfel
- Robert Valberg as Prosecutor in Kopenhagen

== Bibliography ==
- Von Dassanowsky, Robert (2005). Austrian Cinema: A History. McFarland. ISBN 978-1-4766-2147-0.
