= Henry Koster =

American film director (1905–1988)

- Born: Hermann Kosterlitz; May 1, 1905; Berlin, German Empire
- Died: September 21, 1988 (aged 83); Camarillo, California, U.S.
- Occupations: Director, screenwriter, producer
- Years active: 1925–1967
- Spouse(s): Kató Király (1935–1941; divorced; 1 child); Peggy Moran (1942–1988; his death; 2 children)

Henry Koster (born Hermann Kosterlitz, May 1, 1905 – September 21, 1988) was a German-born film director. He was the husband of actress Peggy Moran.

== Early life ==
Koster was born Hermann Kosterlitz on May 1, 1905, in Berlin, Germany, to Jewish parents. He was introduced to cinema around the year 1910 when his uncle opened a movie theater in Berlin. Koster's mother played the piano to accompany the films, leaving the young boy to occupy himself by watching the films. After working initially as a short story writer, Kosterlitz was hired by a Berlin movie company as scenarist, becoming an assistant to director Curtis Bernhardt. Bernhardt became sick one day and asked Kosterlitz to take over as director.

== Career ==
In 1932, Koster directed his first film in Berlin, the comedy Thea Roland. Koster was in the midst of directing his second film Das häßliche Mädchen, when Hitler and the Nazi party rose to power. He automatically lost his German citizenship (as did all German Jews) in 1933, when Hitler became chancellor, and managed to complete his second film before being forbidden to make films under the intense, legalized antisemitism, (i.e. persecution of Jews) which accompanied Germany's embrace of Hitler and Nazism. He lost his temper at an SA officer at his bank during lunch hour and knocked the officer out. When the film, written by Koster with Felix Joachimson, had its premiere in autumn 1933 their names were deleted and Koster, along with Joachimson and the many hundreds of other German Jewish filmmakers, writers and musicians, now stateless and unemployable, was forced into exile.

Koster left Germany for France, where he was rehired by Bernhardt (who had left earlier). Eventually Koster went to Budapest and met and married Kató Király in 1934. In Budapest he met Joe Pasternak again, who represented Universal in Europe, and directed three films for him. One of those films was Catherine the Last after a script by Joachimson and Károly Nóti that was remade in 1938 by Norman Taurog as The Girl Downstairs, both versions starring Franciska Gaal. In 1935 Koster received a letter from his friend Gabriel Levy, who asked him to direct a Dutch picture. Unwilling to move to the Netherlands, Koster cabled him "I'm sorry, I'm terribly busy. Besides, I'm now charging a salary which is too much for your small production. If you want to know what my salary is, I make 25.000 dollars for a picture." To his great surprise, Levy cabled him back agreeing to pay him said amount. Thus Koster ended up directing De Kribbebijter, released internationally as The Crosspatch.

In 1936 Koster got a contract to work with Universal Pictures in Hollywood, and he traveled to the United States to work with Pasternak, other refugees and his wife. Although Koster did not speak English, he convinced the studio to let him make Three Smart Girls, for which he personally coached 14-year-old star Deanna Durbin. This picture, a big success, pulled Universal out of bankruptcy. Koster's second Universal film, One Hundred Men and a Girl, with Durbin and Leopold Stokowski also was successful.

Koster discovered Abbott and Costello working at a nightclub in New York. He returned to Hollywood and convinced Universal to hire them. Their first picture, which featured the Who's On First? routine, was One Night in the Tropics. The female lead, Peggy Moran, became Koster's second wife in 1942. When he married Moran, Koster promised her he would put her in every movie he made. He did, but it was her statue. Usually it is a sculptured head on a mantelpiece or a piano or desk. For The Robe, he commissioned a Grecian bust which appears prominently in a Roman villa.

Henry Koster went on to do numerous musicals and family comedies during the late 1930s and early 1940s, with Durbin, Betty Grable, and other musical stars of the era. He and Joe Pasternak filmed a successful screen test for Universal's newest singing star, Gloria Jean, but Koster would never direct one of her features; when Pasternak left Universal for Metro-Goldwyn-Mayer in June 1941, Koster went with him. Ironically, despite Koster's escape from Nazi Germany, when the United States entered World War II Koster was considered an enemy alien and had to stay in his house in the evening. Actor Charles Laughton would visit Koster and play chess with him.

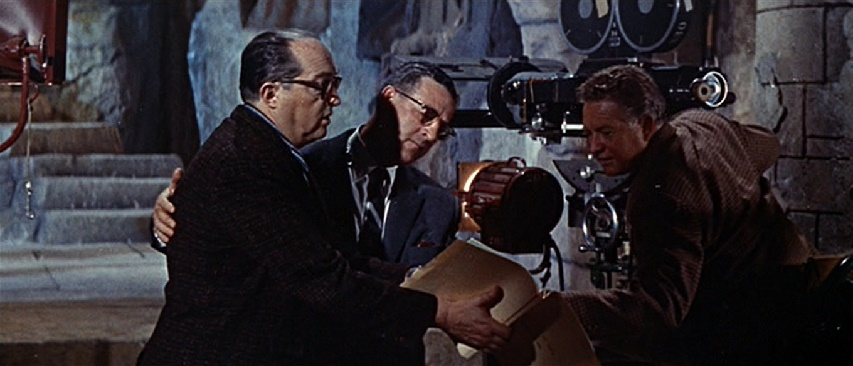
Koster (left) with producer Samuel G. Engel and cameraman Arthur Arling on the set of The Story of Ruth (1960).

Koster's postwar career was equally successful. He was nominated for an Academy Award for The Bishop's Wife (1947). In 1950, he directed the James Stewart comedy Harvey. He directed Richard Burton's first U.S. film, My Cousin Rachel, and then in 1953, he was given The Robe, the first CinemaScope film, and Koster's biggest box office hit.

He directed more costume dramas, including Désirée (1954) with Marlon Brando, The Virgin Queen (1955) with Bette Davis, The Naked Maja (1958) with Ava Gardner and The Story of Ruth (1960) with Elana Eden, then returned to family comedies and musicals, including Flower Drum Song for Universal in 1961.

After Mr Hobbs Takes a Vacation, Koster signed a three picture deal with 20th Century Fox in April 1962 starting with Take Her She's Mine.

His last picture was The Singing Nun in 1965. Koster retired to Leisure Village in Camarillo, California, where he painted a series of portraits of the movie stars with whom he worked.

Although Koster never won an Oscar, he directed six actors who performed Oscar-nominated performances: Cecil Kellaway, Loretta Young, Celeste Holm, Elsa Lanchester, Josephine Hull, James Stewart and Richard Burton. Hull won the Oscar for Harvey.

He died of liver cancer on September 21, 1988.

Some of Koster's home movies are part of the collection of the Academy Film Archive. The archive has preserved a number of these home movies, including behind-the-scenes footage from some of Koster's films.

== Selected filmography ==
=== Screenwriter ===
- The Great Opportunity (1925)
- The Woman from Berlin (1925)
- Orphan of Lowood (1926)
- Children's Souls Accuse You (1927)
- One Plus One Equals Three (1927)
- Prinz Louis Ferdinand (1927)
- The Last Fort (1928)
- Sinful and Sweet (1929)
- German Wine (1929)
- Diary of a Coquette (1929)
- The Last Company (1930)
- A Thousand Words of German (1930)
- The Indictment (1931)
- The Man Who Murdered (1931)
- Woman in the Jungle (1931)
- I'll Stay with You (1931)
- Reckless Youth (1931)
- Who Takes Love Seriously? (1931)
- The Rebel (1932)
- Gypsies of the Night (1932)
- Five from the Jazz Band (1932)
- The Tunnel (1933)
- Toto (1933)
- The Weaker Sex (1933)
- Polish Blood (1934)
- The Switched Bride (1934)
- The Brenken Case (1934)
- Moscow Nights (1934)
- The Double (1934)
- Gold in the Street (1934)
- Ball at the Savoy (1935)

=== Director ===
- Thea Roland (1932)
- Das häßliche Mädchen (1933)
- Peter (1934)
- The Crosspatch (1935)
- The Homely Girl (1935)
- The Affairs of Maupassant (1935)
- Catherine the Last (1936)
- Three Smart Girls (1936)
- One Hundred Men and a Girl (1937)
- The Rage of Paris (1938)
- Three Smart Girls Grow Up (1939)
- First Love (1939)
- Spring Parade (1940)
- It Started with Eve (1941)
- Music for Millions (1944)
- Two Sisters from Boston (1946)
- The Bishop's Wife (1947)
- The Unfinished Dance (1947)
- The Luck of the Irish (1948)
- Come to the Stable (1949)
- My Blue Heaven (1950)
- Harvey (1950)
- Wabash Avenue (1950)
- Mr. Belvedere Rings the Bell (1951)
- No Highway in the Sky (1951)
- My Cousin Rachel (1952)
- Stars and Stripes Forever (1952)
- The Robe (1953)
- Désirée (1954)
- A Man Called Peter (1955)
- The Virgin Queen (1955)
- Good Morning, Miss Dove (1955)
- D-Day the Sixth of June (1956)
- The Power and the Prize (1956)
- My Man Godfrey (1957)
- Fräulein (1958)
- The Naked Maja (1958)
- The Story of Ruth (1960)
- Flower Drum Song (1961)
- Mr. Hobbs Takes a Vacation (1962)
- Take Her, She's Mine (1963)
- Dear Brigitte (1965)
- The Singing Nun (1966)
