= Károly Nóti =

Hungarian screenwriter (1892–1954)

- Born: 1 February 1892; Tasnád, Austria-Hungary
- Died: 28 May 1954 (aged 62); Budapest, Hungary
- Resting place: Kozma Street Jewish Cemetery, Budapest, Hungary
- Occupation: Screenwriter
- Years active: 1930-1954
- Spouse(s): Irena Rosenberger (1919-1920); Margit Schiller (1925-?)

Károly Nóti (1 February 1892 – 28 May 1954) was a Hungarian screenwriter. For his work in Germany and Britain he was credited as Karl Noti. During the 1930s Nóti was one of the leading and most prolific screenwriters in the Hungarian industry.

== Selected filmography ==
- Twice Married (German-language, 1930)
- Three Days Confined to Barracks (German-language, 1930)
- My Cousin from Warsaw (French-language, 1931)
  - My Cousin from Warsaw (German-language, 1931)
- Duty is Duty (German-language, 1931)
- Terror of the Garrison (German-language, 1931)
- Peace of Mind (German-language, 1931)
- Annemarie, the Bride of the Company (German-language, 1931)
- Hyppolit, the Butler (Hungarian-language, 1931)
  - Er und sein Diener (German-language, 1931)
- No Money Needed (German-language, 1932)
  - Pas besoin d'argent (French-language, 1933)
- Scandal on Park Street (German-language, 1932)
- Stolen Wednesday (Hungarian-language, 1933)
- Romance in Budapest (Hungarian-language, 1933)
  - Scandal in Budapest (German-language, 1933)
- Happy (English-language, 1933)
- A Precocious Girl (German-language, 1934)
- The New Relative (Hungarian-language, 1934)
- Viereinhalb Musketiere (German-language, 1935)
- Thanks for Knocking Me Down (German-language, 1935)
- No Monkey Business (English-language, 1935)
- Catherine the Last (German-language, 1936)
- Danube Rendezvous (Hungarian-language, 1936)
- Compliments of Mister Flow (French-language, 1936)
- I May See Her Once a Week (Hungarian-language, 1937)
- Pay Up, Madam! (Hungarian-language, 1937)
- My Daughter Is Different (Hungarian-language, 1937)
- Where Do We Sleep on Sunday? (Hungarian-language, 1937)
- Viki (Hungarian-language, 1937)
- Magda Expelled (Hungarian-language, 1938)
- Billeting (Hungarian-language, 1938)
- The Tamer (French-language, 1938)
- The Girl Downstairs (English-language, 1938)
- Hello, Peter! (Hungarian-language, 1939)
- Queen Elizabeth (Hungarian-language, 1940)
- András (Hungarian-language, 1941)
- Entry Forbidden (Hungarian-language, 1941)
- The Talking Robe (Hungarian-language, 1942)
- The White Train (Hungarian-language, 1943)
- It Happened in Budapest (Hungarian-language, 1944)
- African Bride (Hungarian-language, 1944)
- Without Lies (Hungarian-language, 1946)
- Czardas of Hearts (German-language, 1951)
- Try and Win (Hungarian-language, 1952)
- Not Afraid of Big Animals (German-language, 1953)
- Keep Your Chin Up (Hungarian-language, 1954)
- Three Days Confined to Barracks (German-language, 1955)

== Bibliography ==
- Cunningham, John. Hungarian Cinema: From Coffee House to Multiplex. Wallflower Press, 2004.
