= The Unknown Guest (1931 film) =

1931 film

- Directed by: E.W. Emo
- Written by: Curt J. Braun; Walter Jonas
- Produced by: Max Glass; Kurt Reichmann
- Starring: S.Z. Sakall; Lucie Englisch; Kurt Vespermann
- Cinematography: Willy Winterstein
- Music by: Will Meisel
- Production company: Max Glass Filmproduktion
- Distributed by: Kristall-Film
- Release date: 30 December 1931
- Running time: 83 minutes
- Country: Germany
- Language: German

The Unknown Guest (German: Der unbekannte Gast) is a 1931 German comedy film directed by E.W. Emo and starring S.Z. Sakall, Lucie Englisch and Kurt Vespermann. It was shot at the Halensee Studios in Berlin. The film's sets were designed by the art director Ernö Metzner. It was given an American release in 1935.

== Synopsis ==
When her master and mistress are away, a chambermaid pretends to be the owner of the house where her father visits as he is unaware of her status as a servant.

== Cast ==
- S.Z. Sakall as Leopold Kuhlmann
- Lucie Englisch as Lucie, his daughter
- Kurt Vespermann as Harry Müller
- Annie Markart as Olly, his wife
- Hilde Hildebrand as Ita Hanna
- Senta Söneland as Frau Steinmann
- Hans Brausewetter as Fritz Müller, chauffeur
- Oskar Sima as Jean Diener

== Bibliography ==
- Klaus, Ulrich J. Deutsche Tonfilme: Jahrgang 1931. Klaus-Archiv, 2006. (Possibly? Klaus, Ulrich J. (1989). Deutsche Tonfilme 2. Jahrgang 1931 (in German). Klaus-Archiv. Berlin-Berchtesgaden. ISBN 978-3-927352-01-8. OCLC 263147553. )
- Waldman, Harry. Nazi Films in America, 1933–1942. McFarland, 2008. (Possibly? Waldman, Harry (2008). Nazi films in America, 1933-1942. Jefferson, N.C.: McFarland. ISBN 978-0-7864-3861-7. OCLC 190850826.)
