= Renee XIV =

1946 film

- Directed by: Ákos Ráthonyi
- Starring: Franciska Gaal; Johannes Heesters; Theo Lingen; Hans Moser
- Cinematography: István Eiben
- Production company: Hunnia Filmgyár
- Country: Hungary
- Language: German

Renee XIV was an unfinished 1946 Hungarian film directed by Ákos Ráthonyi and starring Franciska Gaal, Johannes Heesters and Theo Lingen. It was intended to be a German-language film made with Soviet-backing at the Hunnia Film Studio in Budapest, starring Gaal, a popular pre-war star who had not made a movie in several years. After around 10 days of filming, the production was abandoned. Gaal emigrated to America the following year, and she never made another film.

== Cast ==
- Franciska Gaal
- György Dénes
- Theo Lingen
- Johannes Heesters
- Hans Moser as Minister

== Bibliography ==
- Hans-Michael Bock and Tim Bergfelder. The Concise Cinegraph: An Encyclopedia of German Cinema. Berghahn Books.
