= Billy Wilder filmography =

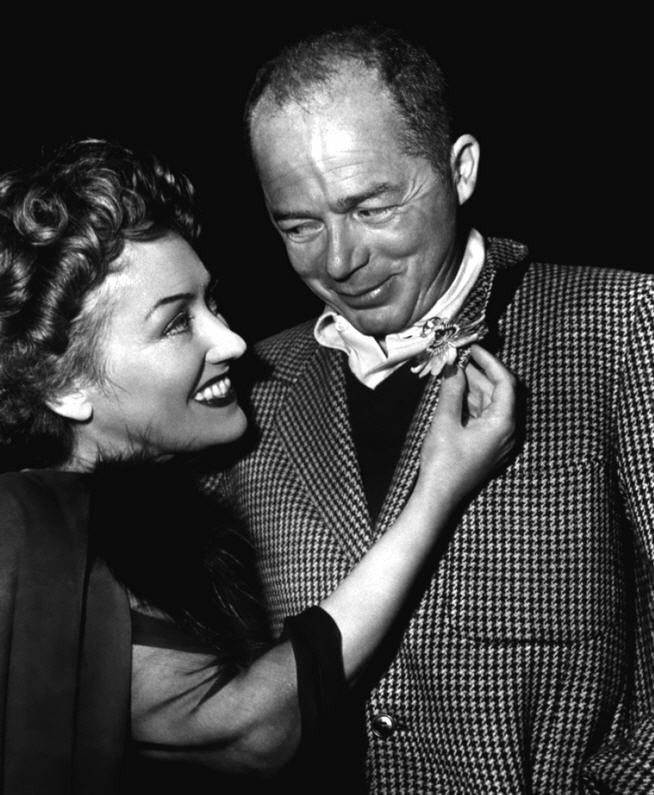
Wilder in 1950 with actress Gloria Swanson

Billy Wilder (1906–2002) was an American filmmaker. Wilder initially pursued a career in journalism after being inspired by an American newsreel. He worked for the Austrian magazine Die Bühne and the newspaper Die Stunde in Vienna, and later for the German newspapers Berliner Nachtausgabe, and Berliner Börsen-Courier in Berlin. His first screenplay was for the German silent thriller The Daredevil Reporter (1929). Wilder fled to Paris in 1933 after the rise of the Nazi Party, where he co-directed and co-wrote the screenplay of French drama Mauvaise Graine (1934). In the same year, Wilder left France on board the RMS Aquitania to work in Hollywood despite having little knowledge of English.

In 1938, he began collaborating with Charles Brackett on screenplays with Ernst Lubitsch's romantic comedy Bluebeard's Eighth Wife. It was the first of 14 consecutive commercially successful films that the pair co-wrote including the comedy Ninotchka (1939), and the romantic drama Hold Back the Dawn (1941), which both received nominations for the Academy Award for Best Screenplay. Wilder made his Hollywood directorial debut with comedy The Major and the Minor (1942), which starred Ginger Rogers and Ray Milland. Two years later, he directed and co-wrote the screenplay for the film noir Double Indemnity (1944), which is considered a classic of its genre. He followed this with The Lost Weekend (1945), a drama about a writer struggling with alcoholism, for which Wilder won his first Academy Award for Best Director and shared the Best Original Screenplay award with Brackett. The film also won Best Picture.

Wilder directed and co-wrote the screenplay for Sunset Boulevard (1950), a film noir about a reclusive silent film actress starring Gloria Swanson and William Holden. It garnered 11 Academy Award nominations including Best Picture, Best Director, and all four acting categories. He won his second Best Screenplay Oscar with Brackett for the film as well as the Writers Guild of America Award for Best Written Drama. During the 1950s, Wilder also received Best Director nominations at the Oscars for Stalag 17 (1953), Sabrina (1954), Witness for the Prosecution (1957), and Some Like It Hot (1959). The lattermost film starring Marilyn Monroe, Tony Curtis, and Jack Lemmon is considered one of the best comedies of all time. In 1960, he directed and co-wrote The Apartment, a romantic comedy about an insurance clerk who allows his coworkers to use his apartment to conduct extra-marital affairs, which starred Lemmon and Shirley MacLaine. The film won the Academy Award for Best Picture and the BAFTA Award for Best Film. Wilder shared the Academy Award for Best Original Screenplay with I. A. L. Diamond.

In recognition of his career, Wilder received the AFI's Life Achievement Award, the British Academy of Film and Television Arts (BAFTA) Fellowship Award, the Directors Guild of America's Lifetime Achievement Award, the Irving G. Thalberg Memorial Award, the Laurel Award for Screenwriting Achievement, and the Producers Guild of America's Lifetime Achievement Award. Double Indemnity, Sunset Boulevard, Some Like It Hot, and The Apartment are included in the AFI's greatest American films of all time. As of 2019, 10 of his films are in the National Film Registry.

== Filmography ==
Year	Title	Credited as			Notes	Ref(s)
Year	Title	Director	Writer	Producer	Notes	Ref(s)
1929	The Daredevil Reporter	No	Yes	No		
1930	People on Sunday	No	Yes	No		
1930	A Student's Song of Heidelberg	No	Yes	No		
1931	The Man in Search of His Murderer	No	Yes	No		
1931	Her Grace Commands	No	Yes	No	Simultaneously filmed as Princesse, à vos ordres! and remade as Adorable	
1931	The Wrong Husband	No	Yes	No		
1931	Emil and the Detectives	No	Yes	No		
1932	Happy Ever After	No	Yes	No	Simultaneously filmed as A Blonde Dream and Un rêve blond	
1932	The Victor	No	Yes	No		
1932	Once There Was a Waltz	No	Yes	No	Remade as Where Is This Lady?	
1932	Scampolo	No	Yes	No	Simultaneously filmed as Un peu d'amour	
1932	The Blue of Heaven	No	Yes	No		
1933	What Women Dream	No	Yes	No	Remade as One Exciting Adventure	
1934	Mauvaise Graine	Yes	Yes	No	Co-directed with Alexander Esway	
1934	Music in the Air	No	Yes	No		
1935	Lottery Lover	No	Yes	No		
1935	Under Pressure	No	Yes	No		
1938	Bluebeard's Eighth Wife	No	Yes	No		
1939	Midnight	No	Yes	No		
1939	What a Life	No	Yes	No		
1939	Ninotchka	No	Yes	No		
1940	Arise, My Love	No	Yes	No		
1941	Hold Back the Dawn	No	Yes	No		
1941	Ball of Fire	No	Yes	No	Remade as A Song Is Born	
1942	The Major and the Minor	Yes	Yes	No		
1943	Five Graves to Cairo	Yes	Yes	No		
1944	Double Indemnity	Yes	Yes	No		
1945	The Lost Weekend	Yes	Yes	No		
1945	Death Mills	Yes	No	No	Also editing supervisor	
1948	The Emperor Waltz	Yes	Yes	No		
1948	A Foreign Affair	Yes	Yes	No		
1950	Sunset Boulevard	Yes	Yes	No		
1951	Ace in the Hole	Yes	Yes	Yes		
1953	Stalag 17	Yes	Yes	Yes		
1954	Sabrina	Yes	Yes	Yes		
1955	The Seven Year Itch	Yes	Yes	Yes		
1957	The Spirit of St. Louis	Yes	Yes	No		
1957	Love in the Afternoon	Yes	Yes	Yes		
1957	Witness for the Prosecution	Yes	Yes	No		
1959	Some Like It Hot	Yes	Yes	Yes		
1960	The Apartment	Yes	Yes	Yes		
1961	One, Two, Three	Yes	Yes	Yes		
1963	Irma la Douce	Yes	Yes	Yes		
1964	Kiss Me, Stupid	Yes	Yes	Yes		
1966	The Fortune Cookie	Yes	Yes	Yes		
1970	The Private Life of Sherlock Holmes	Yes	Yes	Yes		
1972	Avanti!	Yes	Yes	Yes		
1974	The Front Page	Yes	Yes	No		
1978	Fedora	Yes	Yes	Yes		
1981	Buddy Buddy	Yes	Yes	No		

Story writer

- Madame Wants No Children (1933)
- Champagne Waltz (1937)
- Rhythm on the River (1940)

== Bibliography ==
- Brackett, Charles (December 16, 2014). Slide, Anthony (ed.). "It's the Pictures That Got Small": Charles Brackett on Billy Wilder and Hollywood's Golden Age. Columbia University Press. doi:10.7312/slid16708. ISBN 9780231167086. JSTOR 10.7312/slid16708. Archived from the original on February 13, 2023.
- Gemünden, Gerd (2008). A Foreign Affair: Billy Wilder's American Films (1 ed.). Berghahn Books. pp. 167–169. doi:10.3167/9781845454180. ISBN 978-1-84545-418-0. JSTOR j.ctt9qcq5c. Archived from the original on February 12, 2023.
- Gemünden, Gerd (January 15, 2013). A Foreign Affair: Billy Wilder's American Films. Berghahn Books. ISBN 978-0-85745-520-8.
- Phillips, Gene (February 5, 2010). Some Like It Wilder: The Life and Controversial Films of Billy Wilder. University Press of Kentucky. ISBN 978-0-8131-7367-2.
- Sikov, Ed (June 14, 2017). On Sunset Boulevard: The Life and Times of Billy Wilder. University Press of Mississippi. ISBN 978-1-4968-1267-4.
