= No Day Without You =

1933 film

- German: Keinen Tag ohne Dich
- Directed by: Hans Behrendt
- Written by: Ernst Neubach; Wolfgang Wilhelm; Hans von Wolzogen
- Starring: Lee Parry; Oskar Karlweis; Paul Hörbiger
- Cinematography: Georg Bruckbauer; Carl Drews
- Music by: Hans May
- Production company: Phoebus Film
- Release date: 17 February 1933
- Country: Germany
- Language: German

No Day Without You (German: Keinen Tag ohne Dich) is a 1933 German comedy film directed by Hans Behrendt and starring Lee Parry, Oskar Karlweis, and Paul Hörbiger. It was shot at the Johannisthal Studios in Berlin.

== Cast ==
- Lee Parry as Annemarie, das Mädchen von der Nähmaschine
- Oskar Karlweis as Leo, der Schornsteinfeger
- Paul Hörbiger as Bonifazius, der Maler
- Carla Carlsen as Lotte, das Mädel aus der Plättstube
- Anneliese Dobat
- Julius Falkenstein as Herr Gambrinus aus Cottbus
- Kurt Fuß as Berger, Geschäftsführer bei Sturmvogel
- Willy Kaiser-Heyl
- Kardosch-Sänger
- Erich Kestin as Karl, der Bäcker
- Hans Lipschütz as Der Gerichtsvollzieher
- Oskar Joost Orchester
- Hans Repper
- Hans Hermann Schaufuß as Herr Sturmvogel, Inhaber eines Modehauses
- Erwin van Roy
- Carl Wery
- Ida Wüst as Frau Sturmvogel

== Bibliography ==
- Klaus, Ulrich J. Deutsche Tonfilme: Jahrgang 1933. Klaus-Archiv, 1988.
