= Modern Dowry =

1932 film

- German film poster
- German: Moderne Mitgift
- Directed by: E. W. Emo
- Written by: Bobby E. Lüthge; Fritz Rotter
- Produced by: Felix Pfitzner; Ilja Salkind
- Starring: Mártha Eggerth; Georg Alexander; Leo Slezak
- Cinematography: Otto Kanturek; Bruno Timm
- Edited by: Ernst Ensink
- Music by: Hans May
- Production company: T. K. Tonfilm-Produktion
- Distributed by: Paramount-Film
- Release date: 31 August 1932
- Running time: 83 minutes
- Country: Germany
- Language: German

Modern Dowry (German: Moderne Mitgift) is a 1932 German comedy film directed by E. W. Emo and starring Mártha Eggerth, Georg Alexander, and Leo Slezak. It was shot at the Johannisthal Studios in Berlin. The film's sets were designed by the art director Otto Hunte.

== Cast ==
- Mártha Eggerth as Evelyne
- Georg Alexander as Georg Helmbach
- Leo Slezak
- Hans Brausewetter as Fred Keller
- Trude Berliner as Molly Barun
- Erich Kestin as Otto, handyman
- Hermann Blaß as Veltheim, jeweller
- Theo Lingen as Brömmel, car salesman
- Johanna Ewald
- Emmy Wyda
- Ernst Behmer
- Arthur Bergen
- Bruno Lopinski
- Heinrich Marlow
- Ernst Pröckl
- Hans Hermann Schaufuß
- Jazz-Harmonists as Chamber music

== Bibliography ==
- Klaus, Ulrich J. Deutsche Tonfilme: Jahrgang 1932. Klaus-Archiv, 1988.
