= Rolf von Goth =

German actor

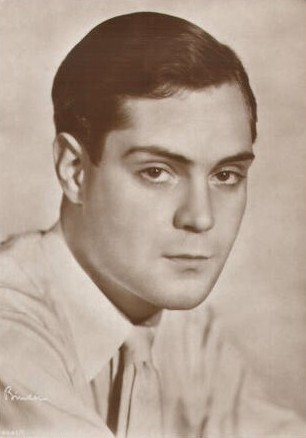
- Rolf von Goth in 1929
- Born: 5 November 1906; Windhoek, German Southwest Africa
- Died: 9 November 1981 (aged 75); West Berlin, West Germany
- Resting place: Friedhof Heerstraße, Berlin
- Occupations: Actor, playwright
- Years active: 1927–1938 (film)
- Spouse: Karin Hardt

Rolf von Goth (5 November 1906 – 9 November 1981) was a film actor from Windhoek in German Southwest Africa who settled and worked in Germany. After appearing in minor roles in several silent films such as Metropolis (1927) von Goth emerged as a prominent actor in the late 1920s. During the early 1930s he played a mixture of leading and supporting roles in films such as Once There Was a Waltz and A Shot at Dawn (1932) but his appearances began to decline during the Nazi era. By the outbreak of the Second World War he had almost entirely retired from film. von Goth switched to become a director of radio shows, becoming extremely successful in the format during the post-war years. He was married to the actress Karin Hardt.

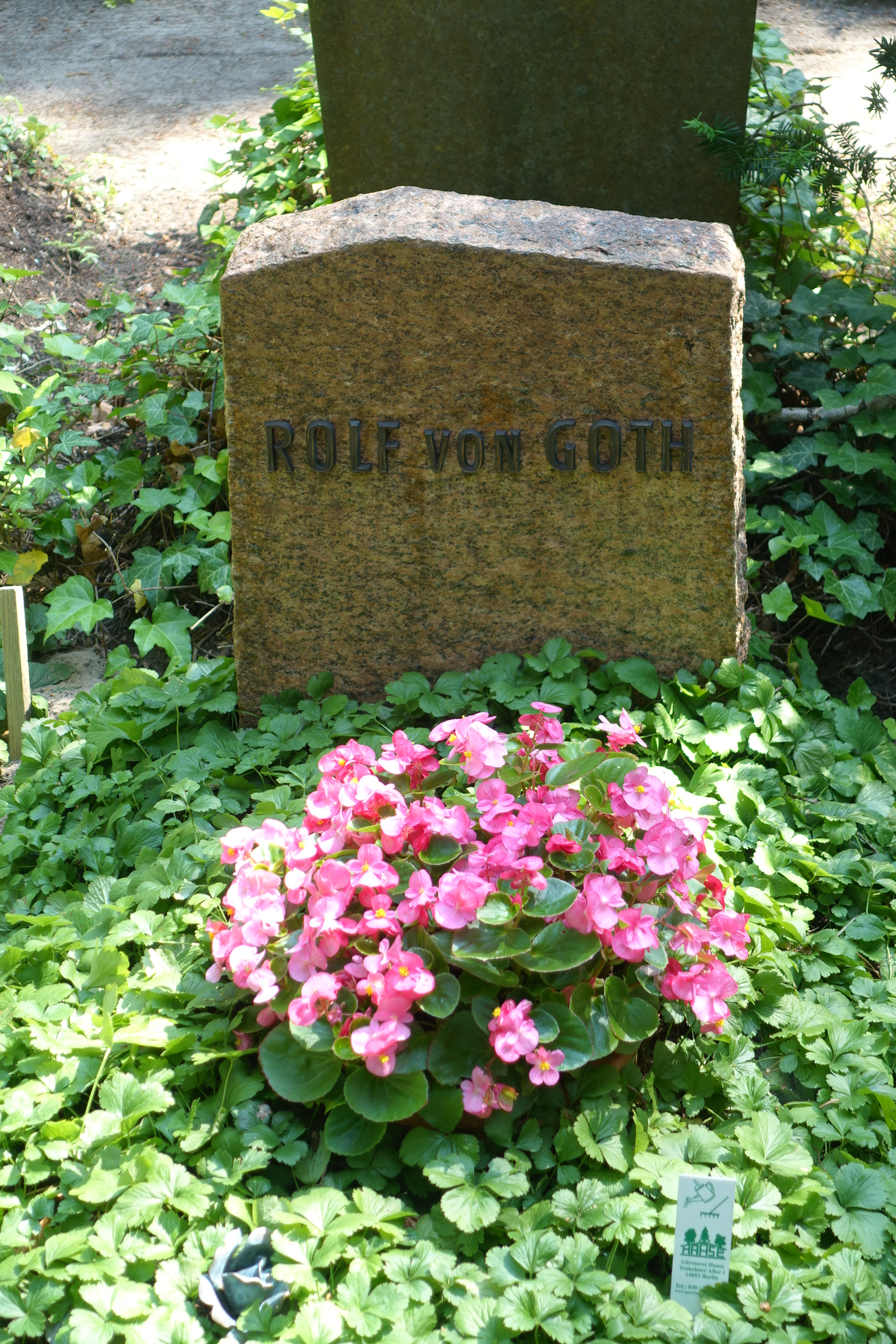
Grave of Rolf von Goth at the Friedhof Heerstraße in Berlin.

== Selected filmography ==
- Metropolis (1927)
- Don Juan in a Girls' School (1928)
- Under Suspicion (1928)
- Misled Youth (1929)
- Spring Awakening (1929)
- Father and Son (1929)
- Next, Please! (1930)
- Boycott (1930)
- Of Life and Death (1930)
- A Thousand Words of German (1930)
- The King of Paris (1930)
- Between Night and Dawn (1931)
- Circus Life (1931)
- A Shot at Dawn (1932)
- Once There Was a Waltz (1932)
- Sehnsucht 202 (1932)
- Five from the Jazz Band (1932)
- The Master Detective (1933)
- A Woman With Power of Attorney (1934)
- At Blonde Kathrein's Place (1934)
- The Castle in Flanders (1936)

== Bibliography ==
- Grange, William. Cultural Chronicle of the Weimar Republic. Scarecrow Press, 2008.
- Youngkin, Stephen. The Lost One: A Life of Peter Lorre. University Press of Kentucky, 2005.
