= Paul Verhoeven's unrealized projects =

During his long career, Dutch film director Paul Verhoeven has worked on many projects that never progressed beyond the pre-production stage under his direction. Some of these projects fell into development hell, were officially cancelled, were in development limbo or would see life under a different production team.

== 1970s ==
=== Harry's Tale ===
After seeing Soldier of Orange, American producer Michael Gruskoff met Verhoeven and the two developed a film based on a novel he had optioned called Harry's Tale, about a Dutch adventurer in the world of the 17th-century triangular trade. Gerard Soeteman was enlisted to write the script, later describing the main character as "an exceptionally silly boy, a Candide-like figure, who finds everything wonderful and goes along with everything. He wants to get his share of the slave trade and kidnaps a young black woman and sells her to a slave trader." However, when the woman turns out to be an important African princess, Harry must retrieve her. Soeteman since called Harry's Tale "an exciting and also comical story," adding, "but if you look closely, there's a dark reality behind it. The Dutch West India Company sailed from Walcheren, and some of the Zeelanders spent several months of the year diligently forging leg irons and branding irons." He felt that Rutger Hauer would have been a good fit for the lead part, however they failed to secure financing for the film. "Unfortunately, it was ahead of its time and the budget was too high," said Gruskoff.

== 1980s ==
=== Return of the Jedi ===
After Steven Spielberg turned down the director's position on Return of the Jedi, he recommended Verhoeven for the job. George Lucas quickly decided against it after seeing the graphic content in Verhoeven's Spetters. "I suppose he was scared that the Jedi would immediately start fucking each other", Verhoeven later joked.

=== Judge Dee ===
In 1981, Verhoeven pitched the idea of making a film on the fictional Chinese detective character Judge Dee to various Hollywood studios, later claiming that he had an option on the Robert van Gulik novels well before Rita McMahon and Francoise De Leu gained the rights for their Dee Productions banner. According to Verhoeven, development stalled on the project as every studio was "terrified of doing a picture in China with Chinese people". By 1988, Verhoeven teamed with producer Mike Wise, McMahon and De Leu and was officially attached to direct Judge Dee for Tri-Star as a major production with the People's Republic of China. At the same time however, filmmaker Bernardo Bertolucci was circling another version with producer Franco Giovale. There was talk of John Lone starring in the main role as Dee in Verhoeven's film, but the casting process was affected by the WGA strike which had halted development of the script by Rospo Pallenberg. In 1991, Judge Dee was listed as being among 21 projects in development at Cinergi Pictures, with Verhoeven still attached.

=== The War of the Worlds remake ===
When Verhoeven arrived in the United States, he received an offer to direct H. G. Wells' The War of the Worlds, which was one of his favorite films as a young boy. He felt that when he arrived in Hollywood, he was returning to his childhood by taking on large-scale special effects movies with subject matter that had interested him in his youth. "When I was younger, I started to make a comic book based on [The War of the Worlds]. I mean I loved that stuff, but then I started to work in Europe as a film director myself and I went much more to a realistic approach. And it's like I forgot about comic books and science fiction and all these childhood dreams that I had. And, strangely enough, when I came to the United States, that came back. It was offered to me, and I jumped at the occasion because probably I had repressed it for twelve or fifteen years," he said in an interview. His co-writer and collaborator, Gerard Soeteman, was disinterested in sci-fi fantasy, so no development was ultimately made on the film.

=== The Thing on the Doorstep ===
Also during the early 1980s, while Verhoeven was still finding his way in Hollywood, he was keen on directing on horror film. Through producer Paula Weinstein, talks had been arranged with several major studios, resulting in a commission for a screenplay of Verhoeven's choice, to be written by Gerard Soeteman. Since Verhoeven wanted to make a horror film as his "first test of skill", Soeteman selected "The Thing on the Doorstep" by H. P. Lovecraft. He remembered: "You couldn't just film it. It was a headless horror story, more atmosphere than suspense. I wanted to connect it to our time. We were already working on an idea about Vikings who had landed in America and encountered Native Americans there. What if we linked that to Lovecraft's notion of a pathological need to perpetuate existence?" Soeteman began writing a story which linked transmigration to the mythology of the downfalls of Norse sagas, and gave it a contemporary twist by making the protagonist an advisor to a newly-elected American president. "He comes into contact with this woman, and gradually becomes possessed by the soul of her Viking-descended father. You see him slowly going mad. Such a man is a ticking time bomb, who then goes on to advise the president," described Soeteman. The idea was naturally rejected in the U.S., where the Iran–Contra affair had broken out only several months afterward.

=== Death Comes as the End ===
In 1984, following the release of The Fourth Man, Verhoeven announced that he planned to film Agatha Christie's historical mystery novel Death Comes as the End as his next project.

=== White Trash ===
In the 1980s, a script by RoboCop screenwriter Edward Neumeier entitled White Trash was developed at Carolco Pictures with Verhoeven attached as the director. The log line reads: "A southern woman hires a mercenary to kill her sister's husband". Approximately $320,000 in production costs was spent.

=== Black Rain ===
Around 1988, Verhoeven was preparing to direct Black Rain with Michael Douglas starring; however, he left the project due to its lengthy development and accepted an offer to do Total Recall instead. Black Rain was thus directed by Ridley Scott, and opened the following year.

=== Rescue ===
In 1989, Jeffrey Lurie announced he would be producing Rescue, a political action-thriller about the South African secret police. Verhoeven would have directed the project via Lurie's Chestnut Hill Productions.

== 1990s ==
=== Leningrad: The 900 Days ===
In May 1990, Italian producer Alberto Grimaldi announced to Variety that Verhoeven would take over the director's position of Leningrad: The 900 Days following Sergio Leone's death, and that production would take place in 1991.

=== Untitled black comedy film ===
While promoting Total Recall, during an interview for Film Comment published in their July 1990 issue, Verhoeven expressed his desire to direct a comedy film, and named the works of Billy Wilder as being along the lines of what he would like to do. When posed the question as to when he would make a comedy during a separate interview conducted in November, Verhoeven divulged that he was actively searching for scripts in Los Angeles and cited the then-recent film A Fish Called Wanda as a model example. He further acknowledged that he was working on a concept for a black comedy about two women who are married to two unpleasant men and decide to get rid of them both. "It's kind of a dangerous subject for Los Angeles, for Hollywood. It might be too dark for them, although it's kind of a comedy. So I don't know really if it will be made. It will be ready probably in a couple of months," said Verhoeven, before estimating the project's budget at roughly $20 million max. In 2017, Verhoeven once again reiterated his intent to film a comedy. He supposedly presented his interest to Woody Allen, offering to direct one of his scripts if he ever became too old to be on set. "I told my agents I'd love to do a comedy, but I've never seen any reach my desk," he added, "I'm waiting for Woody."

=== Women ===
In the early 1990s, Verhoeven was lined up to direct a screen version of Charles Bukowski's Women, a fictionalized account of the author's experiences with sex and romance.

=== Fallen Angels TV series ===
In 1992, Verhoeven was listed among several directors attached to do a half-hour episode of an anthology series set up at Showtime, which would be titled Fallen Angels. The series aimed to adapt crime stories by writers including Raymond Chandler, Dashiell Hammett, Cornell Woolrich and James M. Cain.

=== Mistress of the Seas ===
Verhoeven was attached to direct the film adaptation of John Carlova's book Mistress of the Seas for Columbia Pictures, with Geena Davis attached to star and a planned production start between November 1993 and January 1994. However, on July 13, 1993, it was announced that Verhoeven would no longer direct the film due to creative differences. Davis would end up making Cutthroat Island instead.

=== Crusade ===
External videos
- "CRUSADE" - ARNOLD SCHWARZENEGGER'S UNMADE EPIC on YouTube (21:49)

In 1993, Verhoeven began pre-production on the historical epic Crusade for Carolco, with Arnold Schwarzenegger set to star and John Turturro, Robert Duvall and Jennifer Connelly in talks to join the project. Carolco ultimately shelved the project owing to its projected $100 million budget, and Verhoeven eventually moved on to other projects. Walon Green wrote the script. In 1999, there were talks of Crusade potentially being revived.

=== Bimbos ===
Before the release of Showgirls, Verhoeven had planned a follow-up called Bimbos which would have seen the character of Nomi, played by Elizabeth Berkley, going to Hollywood. However, due to the film's box-office failure, ideas for a sequel were scrapped. "If we could only make Elizabeth Berkley 20 years younger now, I would love to make Bimbos today", Verhoeven said in 2015. A standalone sequel, titled Showgirls 2: Penny's from Heaven, was produced, but without the involvement of Verhoeven or Berkley.

=== The Alienist ===
In May 1995, following an initial delay in the start date for production of Starship Troopers, Verhoeven told Variety that he had become interested in adapting Caleb Carr's The Alienist for Scott Rudin at Paramount. "I started reading the book and was intrigued, then I put it down when I read [Curtis Hanson] was doing it", he said. After Hanson's version fell apart, Verhoeven returned to the project.

=== Marquis de Sade ===
Also in May 1995, Verhoeven was developing a Marquis de Sade biopic, telling Variety that Walon Green was going to soon begin writing the second draft. Carolco Pictures was originally involved in the $1 million book purchase, though the French company Chargeurs later took control of the project. Sharon Stone was allegedly set to reunite with Verhoeven for the project, in which she was to play de Sade's "baleful mother". In a 1997 interview, Verhoeven also pondered hiring Jerry Goldsmith to compose the score for the Marquis de Sade project.

=== Houdini ===
On July 10, 1997, it was reported that Verhoeven was in negotiations to direct a film about the mysterious life of Harry Houdini with Tom Cruise to star in the film for Columbia Pictures. The script was written by Stephen J. Rivele and Christopher Wilkinson. Ang Lee became attached in his place by summer the following year.

=== Official Assassins ===
On August 5, 1998, Verhoeven struck a deal to develop and direct Official Assassins for Phoenix Pictures and Kingsgate Films. Set in post-World War II Berlin, the project was loosely based on Capt. Peter Mason's non-fiction account of the same title about his intelligence activities for the British government. Chris Bertolini was to write the film. Arnold Schwarzenegger was mentioned to star. On June 14, 2002, Verhoeven confirmed that Official Assassins had been cancelled indefinitely: "It's very critical of the U.S. government and I had to stop casting because nobody wanted to do it".

=== The Secret Road ===
On November 1, 1999, it was reported that Verhoeven was on board to direct The Secret Road, a film proposal based on a treatment written by journalist and producer Howard Blum for Columbia Pictures. Verhoeven had long hoped to make a film about a young Adolf Hitler, wanting The Secret Road to feature Hitler's Germany as its main antagonist.

== 2000s ==
=== With Wings as Eagles ===
On February 10, 2000, it was rumored that Verhoeven would reteam with star-collaborator Arnold Schwarzenegger on a World War II film titled With Wings as Eagles.

=== Rasputin ===
On May 29, 2000, it was reported that Verhoeven would direct Rasputin, written by Roselyne Bosch based on the life of Russian mystic Grigori Rasputin. Budgeted at $50 million, the film was to have been produced through Légende Entreprises. Verhoeven planned to film in Moscow and St. Petersberg the following spring, and Gary Oldman, Ralph Fiennes and Val Kilmer were all rumored to be vying for the title role.

=== Basic Instinct sequel ===
On July 25, 2000, IGN reported that Verhoeven had considered but ultimately turned down directing duties for the sequel to his film Basic Instinct. An August 15 report from Variety clarified that, before turning it down, Verhoeven had a meeting with Sharon Stone to reconsider returning and wound up making numerous suggestions to tweak the script.

=== Other Powers ===
On August 14, 2000, it was reported that Verhoeven was pursuing the biopic Other Powers as his next project, based on Barbara Goldsmith's 1998 biography about early suffragette leader Victoria Woodhull. Verhoeven said of Woodhull: "She was a proponent of free love—a promiscuous, vital woman." Tom Cruise was attached to produce, with Nicole Kidman in mind for the role. On June 14, 2002, Verhoeven stated: "The Woodhull project is written, but I've not been able to find financing – I'm waiting to hear from Nicole".

=== The Source ===
On August 15, 2000, it was reported that Verhoeven had "several other prominent possibles" for his next film, including one based on Guy de Maupassant's short story Mont-Oriol, which was said to "harken back" to his early pre-blockbuster Dutch films like Spetters and The Fourth Man. Former Endemol chief Joop van den Ende was producing the project through his new Amsterdam-based outfit Solo. By May 12, 2001, it was reported that Verhoeven would return to Europe to make the Mont-Oriel adaptation entitled The Source. Adapted by Julie Talen, Gerard Soeteman and Verhoeven himself, the project was scheduled to begin production the following year in spring, produced by Jeremy Thomas with a budget of $30 million. When later asked what came of the project, Verhoeven responded, "I never managed to find the funding to make it happen."

=== Batavia's Graveyard ===
On April 11, 2002, it was reported that Verhoeven was to direct the epic film Batavia's Graveyard, about the aftermath of the shipwreck the Dutch East India Company's flagship. Gerard Soeteman, a screenwriter who worked with Verhoeven previously, was set to write the screenplay adaptation of the historical novel on which the film would have been based. Verhoeven described Mike Dash's book as "an adult Lord of the Flies"; he added: "This is a fantastic story, because it gives us an ultra-villain, let's say a proto-Hitler". As of 2003, Verhoeven was in preproduction on the film through the British company Film4, and was then attempting to secure the use of a lifesize replica of the actual Batavia ship. Then, in 2005, it was reported that the Dutch Film Fund would be investing in the development of the project, which had since stalled when financing fell through. At the time of the announcement, Soeteman was midway through writing the screenplay.

=== Void Moon ===
On January 9, 2003, it was reported that Elie Samaha's Franchise Pictures had three new projects available for pre-sale at AFM, including Verhoeven's next film Void Moon, adapted by Michael Cristofer from the novel of the same name by Michael Connelly. The actress who was to portray the lead femme fatale and the filming dates were not indicated.

=== Solace ===
On April 3, 2003, Verhoeven was in negotiations with New Line Cinema to direct the thriller Solace. Written by Ted Griffin and Sean Bailey, Solace centers on a psychic detective tracking a killer who leaves behind no clues while terrorizing New York. Prior to Verhoeven's involvement, Nick Cassavetes and Miguel Sapochnik had been attached to direct. The film was ultimately released in 2015, directed by Afonso Poyart.

=== Untitled Jan Montyn biopic ===
On April 23, 2003, Verhoeven was planning to shoot a biopic on the Dutch artist Jan Montyn, which would have been based on the novel Montyn, written in 1982 by Dirk Ayelt Kooiman. The script was being written by Edwin de Vries, and was to have been produced by Volkert Struycken and Errol Nayci. Verhoeven told a Dutch news agency by 2004 that he was no longer directing the film due to a conflict with the producer.

=== The Paperboy ===
On October 10, 2003, Verhoeven revealed in an interview that he had written an English language script with Jan de Bont called Paperboy, and that filming was expected to start before the end of the year. The script was based on the novel The Paperboy by Pete Dexter, and was later officially reported in 2007 to be going into production in Florida and Louisiana, with Verhoeven directing and de Bont producing. The film was budgeted at $27 million. A film of the novel was later made, but directed by Lee Daniels.

=== One Step Behind ===
On January 7, 2004, it was reported that German production house Constantin Film approached Verhoeven to direct their film adaptation of Swedish crime thriller One Step Behind by author Henning Mankell, which he agreed to. Gerard Soeteman was writing the script, and while no casting had begun by that point, Verhoeven already anticipated shooting the film in Maine later that year.

=== Beast of Bataan ===
On May 5, 2005, Verhoeven was set to direct Beast of Bataan, a feature adaptation based on A Trial of Generals by author Lawrence Taylor. According to Variety, the film "follows the war crimes trial of Lt. Gen. Masaharu Homma at the end of WWII." Screenwriter Mark Jean wrote the adaptation, and although no cast members were announced to be attached at the time, Verhoeven planned to go into production that winter. Verhoeven was later replaced by director Fred Schepisi due to scheduling conflicts and his commitment to Black Book.

=== Azazel ===
On May 12, 2005, Verhoeven was interested in directing and producing the film adaptation of Boris Akunin's novel The Winter Queen with Thomas Hedman and Alan Marshall producing the film through Seven Arts Entertainment and Future Film. On February 11, 2007, it was reported that the film, retitled Azazel, was set to go into production in the summer that year and shoot in St. Petersberg and London. On November 9, 2009, Verhoeven was replaced as the director by Fyodor Bondarchuk.

=== Kneeling on a Flowerbed of Violets ===
On May 12, 2006, a Dutch-language adaptation of Jan Siebelink's biography Knielen op een bed violen was reported to be in development, with Verhoeven directing and co-writing the script with Gerard Soeteman. Budgeted at $12.9 million, the project was scheduled for shooting the following year in the Netherlands.

=== The Thomas Crown Affair sequel ===
On November 12, 2007, Verhoeven was interested in directing the sequel to John McTiernan's The Thomas Crown Affair remake, with Pierce Brosnan starring and producing with Beau St. Clair and Dino Conte for Metro-Goldwyn-Mayer, but on April 15, 2010, Verhoeven left the project.

=== The Forgotten Soldier ===
On July 21, 2008, Screen Daily reported that Verhoeven had become attached to direct the World War II film The Forgotten Soldier, based on the memoir by Guy Sajer. Michael Frost Beckner wrote the screenplay for the project and would have produced alongside John Beckner and Verhoeven. The producers planned to shoot in 2009 on location in eastern Europe.

=== Untitled erotic thriller film ===
On September 9, 2008, Verhoeven was in talks to direct an untitled film written by Wendy Miller about an affair between a college intern and the boss's wife. Relativity Media picked up the script earlier in May of that year, with an early 2009 start date eyed for production.

=== The Surrogate ===
On May 28, 2009, Verhoeven was set to direct the film adaptation of Kathy Mackel's The Surrogate, with Halle Berry attached to star for 20th Century Fox, which Verhoeven said in 2010 that the film is in development, but its fate is unknown after Disney's acquisition of 21st Century Fox was completed or the rights lapsed back to Mackel.

== 2010s ==
=== The Last Express ===
On April 13, 2010, Verhoeven was interested in directing the film adaptation of Jordan Mechner's video game The Last Express with Mechner writing the script. In 2012, Verhoeven updated that the project was still in the works and that, until then, it had not been possible to finance it. He also said that it would have a "kind of romantic, slightly over the top, adventurous style", comparing it to The Lady Vanishes and Murder on the Orient Express.

=== The Hidden Force ===
On August 24, 2010, Verhoeven was set to direct the biographical film adaptation of Louis Couperus' novel The Hidden Force with San Fu Maltha attached to produce the film and Gerard Soeteman writing the screenplay. Five years later, the producer was still working to get the project off the ground with Verhoeven.

=== Eternal ===
On October 14, 2010, it was announced that Verhoeven would direct the supernatural thriller Eternal written by David Loughery for Sidney Kimmel Entertainment, however this attempt fell through.

=== Jesus of Nazareth film ===
In April 2011, it was reported that Verhoeven was seeking financial backers for a film adaptation of his 2007 book Jesus of Nazareth, which he co-wrote with Rob Van Scheers. In June 2012, it was announced that Chris Hanley would produce the film and that Roger Avary would write the screenplay. That November, Verhoeven revealed to IndieWire that the collaboration with Avary did not work out and that he was searching for a new writer. "It's still there, but it's a bit of a dangerous project", Verhoeven noted. He planned to shoot it in Europe.

=== Rogue ===
In November 2012, Verhoeven mentioned that he was developing a film for Bill Mechanic called Rogue set against the backdrop of the Mexican drug cartels. "It's pretty tough", said Verhoeven. "A real film noir. Where you know that the guy is going to die, like Double Indemnity or Sunset Boulevard. That's what I liked about it".

=== Untitled Turkish Revolution film ===
Also in November 2012, Verhoeven was in progress developing a film about the secularization in Turkey in 1923, set during the time of Atatürk's reforms.

=== Lyon 1943 ===
On May 11, 2016, it was reported that Verhoeven was planning a second film on the subject of the World War French resistance, titled Lyon 1943, which would have been set over a period of several months during 1943 and feature Klaus Barbie and Jean Moulin as main characters. Saïd Ben Saïd was to be producer and David Birke the writer. It was to be Verhoeven's next film after Elle.

=== Bel Ami TV miniseries ===
Screen Daily also reported on May 11, 2016 that, in addition to Lyon 1943, Verhoeven was also working on a TV drama loosely based on the book Bel-Ami by Guy de Maupassant, alongside Gerard Soeteman. On May 21, IndieWire reported that Verhoeven next planned to make another Dutch film, Bel Ami, which would possibly be made for television. "[It's] a universal story, that of a man who climbs the social ladder thanks to women," Verhoeven said during an interview, wherein he also revealed that they would adapt the story for contemporary times. By 2020, Bel Ami had been retooled into an eight-episode miniseries. Verhoeven explained the reasoning for the change: "We initially wanted to make a film of it, but then we could only give the women very little screen time. In the current plan, they all get their own episode."

=== The Secret of a Good Marriage ===
In May 2018, it was reported that Verhoeven was working on a new Dutch film, provisionally entitled Het geheim van een goed huwelijk, with Tricked co-writer Robert Alberdingk Thijm. Of the collaboration, Verhoeven said he found it "really fun to do something with the new generation again." The film was to feature many characters of different ages and said to be a story about family. The Netherlands Film Fund awarded funding for the project's development. Further details regarding the plot were kept under wraps. In March 2020, Verhoeven updated that development on the project had briefly stalled since the previous year's surgeries on his hip and colon.

== 2020s ==
=== Young Sinner ===
In March 2020, Verhoeven told NRC that he and screenwriter Edward Neumeier were "working on a good idea" during the COVID-19 pandemic, adding, "If that takes off, I might make my return to Hollywood." In December the following year, they announced to MovieMaker that the project was an original political thriller titled Young Sinner, set in Washington, D.C., about a "young staffer who works for a powerful Senator [and] is drawn into a web of international intrigue and danger". Verhoeven hoped to begin shooting in 2024. In a June 2025 interview, Verhoeven gave a semi-positive update that the final draft of the script was nearing completion. He went on to suggest that, even by his standards, Young Sinner might be considered too provocative for financiers. "It's much more extreme this time, believe me," he told Libération. "The film features a young Christian woman, very devout but very sexually-oriented, in the United States. And there's no question of watering down anything." In another interview with Radio France, Verhoeven provided further details: "It's about an Evangelical Christian girl who really likes sex. She believes in Jesus."

=== Sans Compter ===
In August 2023, it was confirmed by producer Saïd Ben Saïd that Verhoeven's next directing project would be an adaptation of Philippe Djian's novel Sans Compter.

== Bibliography ==
- Shea, Chris; Jennings, Wade (2004) [November 1990]. "CHAPTER TEN: Paul Verhoeven". In Duchovnay, Gerald (ed.). Film Voices: Interviews from Post Script. SUNY Press. ISBN 9780791484753.
