= The Testament of Cornelius Gulden =

1932 film

- Directed by: E. W. Emo
- Written by: Walter Schlee; Walter Wassermann
- Based on: The Testament of Cornelius Gulden (novel) by Ludwig von Wohl
- Starring: Magda Schneider; Georg Alexander; Theo Lingen
- Cinematography: Willy Goldberger
- Edited by: Ernst Ensink
- Music by: Otto Stransky
- Production company: Itala-Film
- Distributed by: Messtro-Film
- Release date: 3 November 1932
- Running time: 84 minutes
- Country: Germany
- Language: German

The Testament of Cornelius Gulden (German: Das Testament des Cornelius Gulden) is a 1932 German drama film directed by E. W. Emo and starring Magda Schneider, Georg Alexander, and Theo Lingen. It is based on the 1930 novel of the same title by Ludwig von Wohl.

The film's sets were designed by the art director Max Heilbronner.

== Cast ==
- Magda Schneider as Flox Winter
- Georg Alexander as Tommy Quint
- Theo Lingen as Edgar Magnussen
- Ida Wüst as Renee Malvy
- Jakob Tiedtke as Cornelius Gulden
- Hedwig Wangel as Frau Winter
- Else Reval as Frau Kießling
- Kurt Lilien as Herr Manthey
- Paul Henckels as Herr Giesicke
- Ilse Fürstenberg as Frau Giesicke
- Julius Falkenstein as Herr Bleisenkel
- Albert Paulig as Herr Spitz
- Leo Peukert
- Erich Kestin as Otto
- Fritz Odemar as Bobby Liechenstein
- Paul Samson-Körner as Paul

== Bibliography ==
- Parish, James Robert (1977). Film Actors Guide: Western Europe. Metuchen, NJ: Scarecrow Press. ISBN 978-0-8108-1044-0.
