= Wilhelm Depenau =

German art director (1884–1952)

- Born: 3 April 1884; Düren, German Empire
- Died: 26 August 1952 (aged 68); West Berlin, West Germany
- Occupation: Art director
- Years active: 1924–1951 (film )

Wilhelm Depenau (1884-1952) was a German art director.

== Selected filmography ==
- The Most Beautiful Woman in the World (1924)
- Come Back, All Is Forgiven (1929)
- Viennese Waltz (1932)
- The Love Hotel (1933)
- Roses from the South (1934)
- The Double (1934)
- Little Dorrit (1934)
- The Young Count (1935)
- The Red Rider (1935)
- She and the Three (1935)
- The Blonde Carmen (1935)
- Knockout (1935)
- The Merry Wives (1936)
- Ninety Minute Stopover (1936)
- The Bashful Casanova (1936)
- Land of Love (1937)
- Water for Canitoga (1939)
- Detours to Happiness (1939)
- The Fox of Glenarvon (1940)
- My Life for Ireland (1941)
- My Friend Josephine (1942)
- Street Acquaintances (1948)
- Don't Dream, Annette (1949)
- The Last Year (1951)
- Eyes of Love (1951)

== Bibliography ==
- Reid, John Howard. Science-fiction & Fantasy Cinema: Classic Films of Horror, Sci-fi & The Supernatural. 2007.
