= The Master Detective (1933 film) =

1933 film directed by Franz Seitz

- German: Der Meisterdetektiv
- Directed by: Franz Seitz
- Written by: Joseph Dalman; Joe Stöckel
- Starring: Weiß Ferdl; Ery Bos; Hans Stüwe
- Cinematography: Franz Koch
- Edited by: Gottlieb Madl
- Music by: Toni Thoms
- Production company: Bavaria Film
- Distributed by: Bavaria Film
- Release date: 15 May 1933
- Running time: 96 minutes
- Country: Germany
- Language: German

The Master Detective (German: Der Meisterdetektiv) is a 1933 German comedy crime film directed by Franz Seitz and starring Weiß Ferdl, Ery Bos and Hans Stüwe. It was shot at the Bavaria Studios in Munich. The film's sets were designed by the art director Max Seefelder.

== Plot ==
A snooping busybody considers himself a great investigator. When his niece acquires a new boyfriend he decides to check out his background. Unwittingly he becomes mixed up in a real crime.

== Cast ==
- Weiß Ferdl as Jakob Hase, gen. d. "Schnauzer"
- Ery Bos as Alice Radley
- Hans Stüwe as Max Müller
- Rolf von Goth as Fritz Körner
- Fritz Kampers as Paul Krause
- Joe Stöckel as Dr. Flint
- Ria Waldau as Betty - Jakobs Nichte
- Therese Giehse as Frl. Holzapfel
