= Hans May =

Austrian film composer (1886–1958)

- Born: 11 July 1886; Vienna, Austro-Hungarian Empire
- Died: 31 December 1958 (aged 72); Beaulieu-sur-Mer, France
- Other name: Johannes Mayer
- Occupation: Composer
- Years active: 1925 – 1958 (film)

Hans May (11 July 1886 – 31 December 1958) was an Austrian-born composer who went into exile in Britain in 1936 after the Nazis came to power in his homeland, being of Jewish descent.

Born in Vienna, May studied there with Anton Door (piano) and Richard Heuberger (composition). He gave his first piano recital at the age of 10 and had qualified as an operatic conductor by 18, touring extensively from Berlin to Cairo and Istanbul. He first gained attention as a composer during the 1920s and 1930s, writing German language songs such as "Ein Lied geht um die Welt" (1933) and "Es wird im Leben dir mehr genommen als gegeben" (1936), gaining considerable popularity in Europe through recordings by Joseph Schmidt and Richard Tauber. May was one of the pioneers of film music, writing scores for silent movies in Berlin and Paris, and associated with the Kinothek catalogued library of music intended to accompany silent films.

Initially, most of his work was for short silent films, as well as musicals. He arranged the music for the German presentation of the Russian silent classic Panzerkeuzer Potemkin. However, May survived the change-over from silent to sound films. Two early examples (both for British International Pictures) were The Flame of Love in 1930 (starring Anna May Wong), followed by Bridegroom Widow the following year. After his enforced move to the UK in 1936, he began scoring full length feature sound films for organisations such as Boulting Brothers and Rank/Gainsborough Pictures. Notable scores include Thunder Rock (1942), Madonna of the Seven Moons (1945), The Wicked Lady (1945) and Brighton Rock (1948). May composed over a hundred film scores.

His musicals include Carissima (book by Eric Maschwitz), which ran for 488 performances at the Palace Theatre from March 1948, and Wedding in Paris (lyrics by Sonny Miller, book by Vera Caspary), which ran for 411 performances at the London Hippodrome from April 1954.

May returned to the European continent in 1957, and continued writing scores for film and stage productions, including Der Kaiser und das Wäschermädel (1957). His musical language and style looked back to the golden age of Viennese operetta and composers such as Franz Lehár and Emmerich Kalman. He died in the South of France on New Years Eve 1958.

== Selected filmography ==
- Wood Love (1925)
- The Third Squadron (1926)
- Lace (1926)
- The Bohemian Dancer (1926)
- White Slave Traffic (1926)
- I Lost My Heart in Heidelberg (1926)
- The Heart of a German Mother (1926)
- Princess Trulala (1926)
- When I Came Back (1926)
- Our Emden (1926)
- We Belong to the Imperial-Royal Infantry Regiment (1926)
- Children's Souls Accuse You (1927)
- His Greatest Bluff (1927)
- The Beggar from Cologne Cathedral (1927)
- A Murderous Girl (1927)
- The Impostor (1927)
- The Eighteen Year Old (1927)
- The Queen of the Variety (1927)
- The Field Marshal (1927)
- Klettermaxe (1927)
- Storm Tide (1927)
- The City of a Thousand Delights (1927)
- The Love of Jeanne Ney (1927)
- Only a Viennese Woman Kisses Like That (1928)
- Vienna, City of Song (1930)
- The Copper (1930)
- The Flame of Love (1930)
- Twice Married (1930)
- The Tiger Murder Case (1930)
- The Road to Dishonour (1930)
- Hai-Tang (1930)
- The Stolen Face (1930)
- A Student's Song of Heidelberg (1930)
- Let's Love and Laugh (1931)
- The Daredevil (1931)
- Weekend in Paradise (1931)
- All is at Stake (1932)
- Modern Dowry (1932)
- The Invisible Front (1932)
- Viennese Waltz (1932)
- The Ladies Diplomat (1932)
- Trenck (1932)
- The Pride of Company Three (1932)
- Ein Lied geht um die Welt (1933) (A song goes round the world)
- Wild Cattle (1934)
- My Song Goes Round the World (1934)
- Beauty of the Night (1934)
- Give Her a Ring (1934)
- The Diplomatic Lover (1934)
- A Star Fell from Heaven (1934)
- The Student's Romance (1935)
- No Monkey Business (1935)
- Ein Stern fällt vom Himmel (A Star falls from Heaven)
- Everything in Life (1936)
- Southern Roses (1936)
- A Star Fell from Heaven (1936)
- Heut ist der schönste Tag in meinem Leben|de (c. 1936)
- The Lilac Domino (1937)
- Under Secret Orders (1937)
- I Killed the Count (1939)
- Paradise Lost (1940)
- Pastor Hall (1940)
- Thunder Rock (1942)
- Back-Room Boy (1942)
- Madonna of the Seven Moons (1945)
- Murder in Reverse (1945)
- Twilight Hour (1945)
- Waltz Time (1945)
- The Wicked Lady (1945)
- Bedelia (1946)
- The Laughing Lady (1946)
- The Trojan Brothers (1946)
- Green Fingers (1947)
- Brighton Rock (1947)
- Mrs. Fitzherbert (1947)
- Uneasy Terms (1948)
- Counterblast (1948)
- Warning to Wantons (1949)
- The Twenty Questions Murder Mystery (1950)
- Guilt Is My Shadow (1950)
- Shadow of the Eagle (1950)
- A Tale of Five Cities (1951)
- Tent City (1951)
- The Rival of the Empress (1951)
- Full House (1952)
- Escape Route (1952)
- The Tall Headlines (1952)
- Rough Shoot (1953)
- Never Let Me Go (1953)
- The Gypsy and the Gentleman (1958)
- A Song Goes Round the World (1958)
