= No Money Needed =

1932 film directed by Carl Boese

- German: Man braucht kein Geld
- Directed by: Carl Boese
- Written by: Ferdinand Alternkirch (play); Károly Nóti; Hans Wilhelm
- Produced by: Arnold Pressburger
- Starring: Hedy Lamarr; Heinz Rühmann; Hans Moser; Ida Wüst
- Cinematography: Willy Goldberger; Karl Sander
- Edited by: Geza Pollatschik
- Music by: Artur Guttmann
- Production company: Cine-Allianz Tonfilm
- Distributed by: Bavaria Film
- Release date: 5 February 1932
- Running time: 92 minutes
- Country: Germany
- Language: German

No Money Needed (German: Man braucht kein Geld) is a 1932 German comedy film directed by Carl Boese and starring Hedy Lamarr, Heinz Rühmann, and Hans Moser. It was shot at the Babelsberg Studios in Berlin with sets designed by the art director Julius von Borsody. It premiered on 5 February 1932. It was based on a play by Ferdinand Alternkirch and was shot during November 1931. A French remake (Pas besoin d'argent) and an Italian remake (Non c'è bisogno di denaro) were made in 1933. Boese himself remade the story in 1953 under the title The Uncle from America.

== Synopsis ==
A virtually bankrupt businessman in a small town manages to convince people that his newly arrived cousin, who is equally impoverished, is a millionaire.

== Cast ==
- Hedy Lamarr as Käthe Brandt
- Heinz Rühmann as Heinz Schmidt
- Hans Moser as Thomas Theodor Hoffmann
- Ida Wüst as Frau Brandt
- Hans Junkermann as Herrmann Brandt
- Kurt Gerron as Bank President Binder
- Paul Henckels as The Mayor
- Hans Hermann Schaufuß as Hotelier
- Albert Florath as head of savings banks
- Fritz Odemar as Schröder
- Gerhard Dammann as husband
- Hugo Fischer-Köppe
- Ludwig Stössel
- Siegfried Berisch
- Wolfgang von Schwindt
- Heinrich Schroth
- Karl Hannemann
- Leopold von Ledebur
