= Impossible Love (film) =

1932 film

- Directed by: Erich Waschneck
- Written by: Erich Waschneck; Franz Winterstein
- Based on: Impossible Love by Alfred Schirokauer
- Produced by: Jules Stern
- Starring: Asta Nielsen; Ery Bos; Ellen Schwanneke
- Cinematography: Bruno Mondi
- Edited by: Friedel Buckow
- Music by: Wolfgang Zeller
- Production company: Märkische Film
- Distributed by: Märkische Film
- Release date: 23 December 1932
- Running time: 88 minutes
- Country: Germany
- Language: German

Impossible Love (German: Unmögliche Liebe) is a 1932 German drama film directed by Erich Waschneck and starring Asta Nielsen, Ery Bos and Ellen Schwanneke. It was Nielsen's final film, and the only sound film she appeared in. It premiered at the Mozartsaal in Berlin. Neilsen had been a major star during the First World War and the early 1920s but her screen career gradually declined and she had not appeared in a film since That Dangerous Age in 1927. Four years after making Impossible Love she returned to her native Denmark. The film is also known by the alternative title of Crown of Thorns.

The film is based on the 1929 novel of the same title by Alfred Schirokauer. It was shot at the Johannisthal Studios in Berlin. The film's sets were designed by the art director Hans Jacoby.

== Synopsis ==
The widowed Vera Holgk arrived in Germany from Riga in 1917 and raised her two daughters alone. Working as a successful sculptor, she has provided for them, directing all her energy towards their wellbeing. Now both are grown up, one a cellist and the other employed in a photographic studio, and contemplating marriage. Vera has more free time and after encountering the charming, younger fellow sculptor Professor Steinkampp, she is persuaded to enter a major sculptor competition. Over time their relationship develops into a romance. Her daughters initially remain unaware of the secret affair.

Vera wins the first prize, but an embittered former lover of Steinkampp maliciously breaks the news of their affair to a newspaper gossip columnist; a major scandal breaks out along with several false claims. This threatens the respectable marriage her eldest daughter hopes to have. Even worse, Vera is devastated to discover that Steinkampp is already married to a woman who is institutionalized. Visiting her in the asylum and finding her to be of kind heart and still very much in love with her husband, Vera realises that her own relationship is doomed.

== Cast ==
- Asta Nielsen as Vera Holgk
- Ery Bos as Nora, ihre Tochter
- Ellen Schwanneke as Toni, ihre Tochter
- Hans Rehmann as Prof. Steinkampp
- Elisabeth Wendt as Katharina Steinkampp, seine Frau
- Anton Pointner as Leopold von Möllendorf
- Walter Steinbeck as Konsul Werner
- Lotte Spira as Fr. Konsul Werner
- Carl Balhaus as Erwin Hammer
- Hilde Hildebrand as Frl. Martini
- Julius Falkenstein as Zimmermann - Diener von Prof. Steinkampp
- Werner Scharf as Hagedorf, Redakteur der 'Gerechtigkeit'
- Tamara Oberländer
- Katja Bennefeld
- Eugen Burg
- Ernst Behmer
- Alfred Haase
- Friedrich Ettel

== Bibliography ==
- Kuhn, Annette; Radstone, Susannah, eds. (1990). The Women's Companion to International Film. University of California Press. ISBN 978-0-520-08879-5.
- Klaus, Ulrich J. Deutsche Tonfilme: Jahrgang 1932. Klaus-Archiv, 1988.
