= The Ladies Diplomat =

1932 film

- German film poster
- German: Der Frauendiplomat
- Directed by: E. W. Emo
- Written by: Curt J. Braun; Bobby E. Lüthge
- Starring: Mártha Eggerth; Max Hansen; Leo Slezak
- Cinematography: Carl Drews
- Music by: Hans May
- Production company: T. K. Tonfilm-Produktion
- Release date: 18 March 1932
- Running time: 74 minutes
- Country: Germany
- Language: German

The Ladies Diplomat (German: Der Frauendiplomat) is a 1932 German comedy film directed by E. W. Emo and starring Mártha Eggerth, Max Hansen, and Leo Slezak. It was remade in Britain in 1934 as How's Chances?

== Synopsis ==
When a womanising military attaché arrives in Berlin, he becomes entangled with a down-to-earth chorus girl Hella.

== Cast ==
- Mártha Eggerth as Hella
- Max Hansen as Fürst Windischberg
- Leo Slezak as Iwan Milhailow
- Anton Pointner as Von Rüstenberg
- Theo Lingen as Drage
- Hilde Hildebrand as Olga seine Frau
- Albert Paulig as De Castellano
- Jessie Vihrog
- Paul Morgan as Ahab Maschulla
- Johannes Roth as Ferdinand ein Diener
- Alexa von Porembsky
- Fritz Spira as Der Oberst
- Ina von Elben as Dolly
- H. Longino as Anita
