= Ery Bos =

German actress (1908–2005)

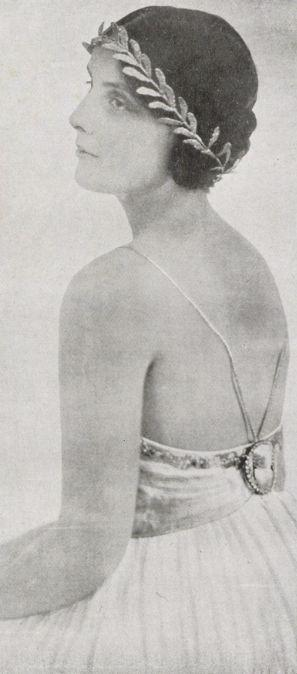
- Bos in 1925
- Born: October 3, 1908; Berlin, German Empire
- Died: March 10, 2005 (aged 96); Chappaqua, New York, United States
- Occupation: Actress
- Years active: 1932-1934

Ery Bos (October 3, 1908 - March 10, 2005) was a German dancer and film actress. She established herself as a star in the cinema of the Weimar Republic, but was forced to flee following the takeover of the Nazi Party due to her Jewish background.

== Selected filmography ==
- Impossible Love (1932)
- A Shot at Dawn (1932)
- The Tsarevich (1933)
- The Master Detective (1933)
- You Are Adorable, Rosmarie (1934)

== Bibliography ==
- Youngkin, Stephen. The Lost One: A Life of Peter Lorre. University Press of Kentucky, 2005.
