= Hans Wilhelm (screenwriter) =

German screenwriter (1904–1980)

- Born: 18 October 1904; Berlin, German Empire
- Died: 23 December 1980 (aged 76); Santa Monica, California; United States
- Occupation: Screenwriter
- Years active: 1925–1966

Hans Wilhelm (18 October 1904 – 23 December 1980) was a German screenwriter. Wilhelm was of Jewish heritage, and was forced to emigrate following the Nazi takeover in 1933. After going into exile he worked in a variety of countries including Britain, France, and Turkey before eventually settling in the United States. He later returned to work in West Germany following the Second World War.

== Selected filmography ==
- Nick, King of the Chauffeurs (dir. Carl Wilhelm, 1925)
- My Aunt, Your Aunt (1927)
- Violantha (dir. Carl Froelich, 1928)
- The Fourth from the Right (dir. Conrad Wiene, 1929)
- German Wine (dir. Carl Froelich, 1929)
- The Last Fort (dir. Curtis Bernhardt, 1929)
- Diary of a Coquette (dir. Constantin J. David, 1929)
- Sinful and Sweet (dir. Karel Lamač, 1929)
- The Last Company (dir. Curtis Bernhardt, 1930)
- A Student's Song of Heidelberg (dir. Karl Hartl, 1930)
- A Thousand Words of German (1930)
- People in the Fire (1930)
- Queen of the Night (dir. Fritz Wendhausen, 1931)
- Berlin-Alexanderplatz (dir. Phil Jutzi, 1931)
- You Don't Forget Such a Girl (dir. Fritz Kortner, 1932)
- No Money Needed (dir. Carl Boese, 1932)
- Companion Wanted (dir. Joe May, 1932)
- Two in a Car (dir. Joe May, 1932)
- Thea Roland (dir. Henry Koster, 1932)
- There Is Only One Love (1933)
- Liebelei (dir. Max Ophüls, 1933)
- Everybody's Woman (dir. Max Ophüls, 1934)
- The Dictator (dir. Victor Saville, 1935)
- Under Western Eyes (dir. Marc Allégret, 1936)
- Bank Holiday (dir. Carol Reed, 1938)
- Prison Without Bars (dir. Brian Desmond Hurst, 1938)
- The Novel of Werther (dir. Max Ophüls, 1938)
- Conflict (dir. Léonide Moguy, 1938)
- Beating Heart (dir. Henri Decoin, 1940)
- There's No Tomorrow (1939)
- Spy for a Day (dir. Mario Zampi, 1940)
- The Thirteen Heroes (dir. Şadan Kâmil, 1943) - Remake of The Last Company (1930)
- I Am a Fugitive (dir. Miguel M. Delgado, 1946)
- Heartbeat (dir. Sam Wood, 1946) - Remake of Beating Heart (1940)
- On an Island with You (dir. Richard Thorpe, 1948)
- Once a Thief (dir. W. Lee Wilder, 1950)
- The Prowler (dir. Joseph Losey, 1951)
- No Time for Flowers (dir. Don Siegel, 1952)
- The Csardas King (1958)
- Christine (dir. Pierre Gaspard-Huit, 1958) - Remake of Liebelei (1933)
- Bombs on Monte Carlo (dir. Georg Jacoby, 1960)
- Five Golden Hours (dir. Mario Zampi, 1961)
- Dime with a Halo (dir. Boris Sagal, 1963)
- Honour Among Thieves (dir. Wolfgang Staudte, 1966)

== Bibliography ==
- Prawer, S.S. Between Two Worlds: The Jewish Presence in German and Austrian Film, 1910-1933. Berghahn Books, 2005.
