= Adolf Robinson =

Austrian opera singer (1838–1920)

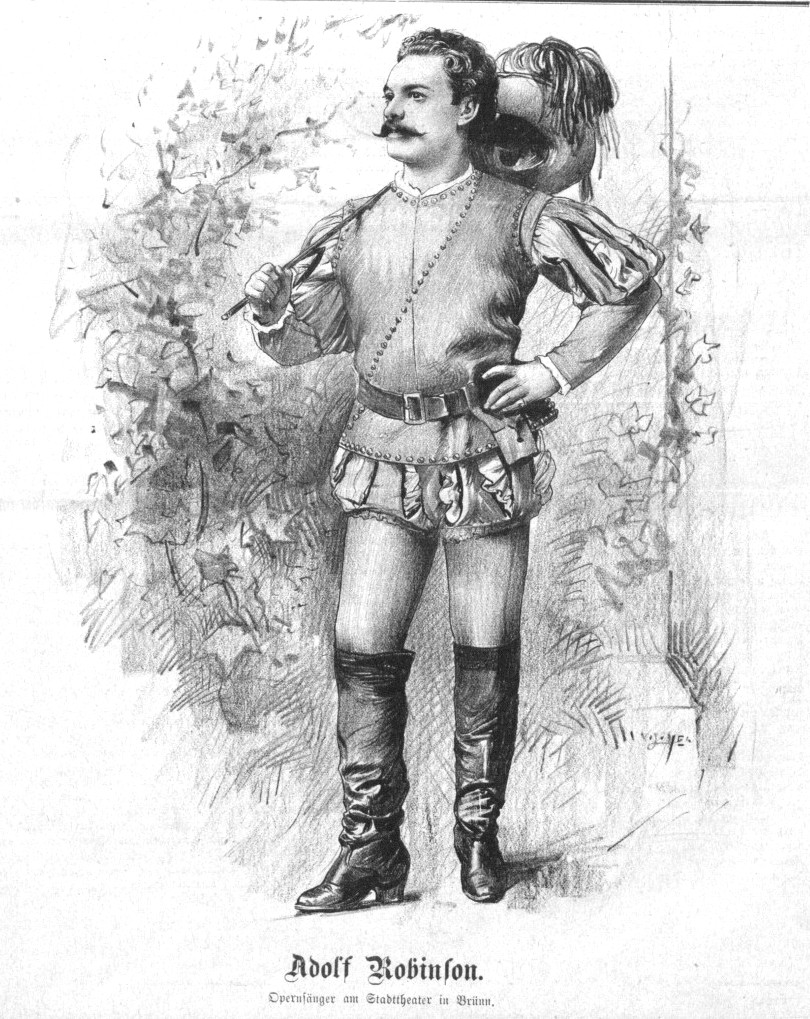
Adolf Robinson (1893)

Adolf Robinson (1838–1920) was an Austrian baritone who had a major opera career during the second half of the 19th century. His extensive stage repertoire contained numerous Wagnerian roles such as Wotan in The Ring Cycle and Hans Sachs in Die Meistersinger von Nürnberg. Other highlights of his career included the title characters in Rossini's William Tell, Mozart's Don Giovanni, Verdi's Rigoletto, Hérold's Zampa, and Heinrich Marschner's Der Templer und die Jüdin.

== Life ==
Robinson was a student of Proch and Levy in Vienna and was educated at the famous school of singing by Francesco Lamperti in Milan. In 1857 he made his debut at the Theater of Olomouc as Carlo in Verdi's Ernani. Beginning in 1862, he sang in Graz at the Berlin Opera. He had engagements at the Deutsches Theater in Prague, at the Opera House in Hamburg, at the Municipal Theater of Wroclaw, and at the Municipal Theater of Bremen. At the same time he left work after an extended guest appearance at the opera houses of the German speaking world. Four times he traveled to North America, where in 1884–89 he performed on the New York Metropolitan Opera with great success. There he sang in 1887 in the premiere of Viktor Nessler's opera Der Trompeter von Säkkingen.

On 25 January 1888 he played the role of Gunther in the American premiere of Wagner's Götterdämmerung. He also appeared as Kurwenal in the New York City premiere of Tristan and Isolde in 1886. Further guest appearances North America included performances in Boston, Philadelphia, Chicago, Cincinnati, St. Louis and San Francisco.

Starting in 1892, Robinson lived in Brno and entered at the local opera house as a guest, but devoted himself to intensive educational activities. He eventually settled down as a teacher in Vienna; his most famous pupil was the great tenor Leo Slezak.

His wife, Leonora Robinson (born Leonore Hahn Edle von Hahnenheim), was also an opera singer. She had been taught by Mrs. Marschner at the Conservatory of Vienna, and in 1869 made her debut at the Court Opera in Vienna. She later came to the opera house of Hamburg and accompanied her husband during his guest appearances in Germany, Amsterdam, London, and the United States, where she sang such roles as Donna Anna in Don Giovanni and Leonore in Fidelio. She also appeared at the Metropolitan Opera. In 1882–83 she took part in a European tour with the traveling Wagner Theater and the impresario Angelo Neumann. Two daughters of the singer couple had singing careers: Ada von Westhofen-Robinson (1878–1914) and Louise Robinson (1884–1934).

== Sources ==
- Eaton, Quaintance, Opera Caravan: Adventures Of The Metropolitan On Tour 1883 – 1956, Metropolitan Opera Guild/Farrar, Straus & Cudahy, 1957.
- Kosch, Wilhelm, Deutsches Theater-Lexikon: Raupach-Rostock (Volume 20 of Deutsches Theater-Lexikon: Biographisches und Bibliographisches Handbuch), Kleinmayr, 1951
- "Opera at the Metropolitan" (PDF). The New York Times. 18 November 1884. p. 5.
- Randel, Don Michael, The Harvard biographical dictionary of music, Harvard University Press, 1996; ISBN 0-674-37299-9
