= A Woman with Power of Attorney =

A Woman With Power of Attorney
- German film poster
- German: Ein Mädchen mit Prokura
- Directed by: Arzén von Cserépy
- Written by: Hans Hömberg
- Based on: A Woman With Power of Attorney by Christa Anita Brück
- Produced by: Max Hippe; Arzén von Cserépy
- Starring: Gerda Maurus; Ernst Dumcke; Rolf von Goth; Hans Adalbert Schlettow
- Cinematography: Guido Seeber
- Edited by: Willy Zeunert
- Music by: Marc Roland
- Production company: Cserepy-Tonfilmproduktion
- Distributed by: Tobis-Sascha Film (Austria)
- Release date: 31 March 1934
- Country: Germany
- Language: German

A Woman With Power of Attorney (German: Ein Mädchen mit Prokura) is a 1934 German drama film directed by Arzén von Cserépy and starring Gerda Maurus, Ernst Dumcke, and Rolf von Goth. It was based on the 1932 novel of the same name by Christa Anita Brück.

== Cast ==
- Gerda Maurus as Thea Iken, attorney
- Ernst Dumcke as bank manager Brüggemann
- Rolf von Goth as Joachim, Brüggemann's son
- Hans Adalbert Schlettow as Veidt, foreign exchange accountant
- Hans Hermann Schaufuß as Strohp, cashier
- Josefine Dora as Frau Strohp
- Jessie Vihrog as Fräulein Prill
- Katrin Weigle as Fräulein Graff
- Karl Morvilius as Roderich
- Kurt Hoellger as Haffke
- Veit Harlan as Schwartzkopf
- Lieselotte Ebel as Fräulein Kablitz, Schwartzkopf's bride
- Theodor Loos as Holsten, lawyer
- Paul Henckels as Paschen, chairman of the jury court
- Paul Heidemann as Finanzrat Spelzig
- Alfred Beierle as Chefredakteur
- Maria Krahn as Frau Kersten
- Hermann Meyer-Falkow as Court guard
- Hugo Flink as commissioner
- Liesl Eckardt as Frau Porst
- Hertha Guthmar
- Karl Harbacher
- Kammann
- Anita Mey
- Karl-Heinz Reppert
- Ernst Rückert
- Wolfgang von Schwindt
- Lotte Werkmeister
