= Hans Hömberg =

German writer (1903–1982)

- Born: 14 December 1903; Berlin, Prussia; German Empire
- Died: 4 July 1982 (aged 78); Kufstein, Tyrol; Austria
- Occupations: Screenwriter; Writer; Journalist
- Years active: 1931–1968 (film)

Hans Hömberg (14 December 1903 – 4 July 1982) was a German playwright, journalist, novelist and screenwriter. Hömberg worked occasionally on feature film scripts, and supplied the idea for Alexis Granowsky's 1931 comedy film The Trunks of Mr. O.F. (1931). Hömberg enjoyed a successful stage career, his biggest hit being Cherries for Rome (1940) although he faced censorship issues with some of his works.

During the Nazi era he also wrote film reviews. He wrote the novelisation of the controversial antisemitic 1940 film Jud Süß directed by Veit Harlan.

== Selected filmography ==
- The Trunks of Mr. O.F. (1931)
- A Woman With Power of Attorney (1934)
- Don't Lose Heart, Suzanne! (1935)
- Much Ado About Nixi (1942)
- His Royal Highness (1953)

== Plays ==
- Cherries for Rome (1940)
- Napoleon in Corsica (1945)

== Bibliography ==
- Tegel, Susan. Jew Suss: His Life and Afterlife in Legend, Literature and Film. Continuum, 2011.
- Youngkin, Stephen. The Lost One: A Life of Peter Lorre. University Press of Kentucky, 2005.
