= Erich Kestin =

German actor

- Born: 25 June 1895; Berlin, German Empire
- Died: 22 May 1969 (aged 73); Berlin, Germany
- Occupation: Actor
- Years active: 1930-1953

Erich Kestin (25 June 1895 – 22 May 1969) was a German actor. He appeared in more than 50 films shows between 1930 and 1953.

== Selected filmography ==
- Dolly Gets Ahead (1930)
- The Shot in the Sound Film Studio (1930)
- The Tiger Murder Case (1930)
- The Stolen Face (1930)
- Love's Carnival (1930)
- The Blonde Nightingale (1930)
- A Student's Song of Heidelberg (1930)
- Her Grace Commands (1931)
- The Paw (1931)
- Ash Wednesday (1931)
- The Leap into the Void (1932)
- The Cheeky Devil (1932)
- Modern Dowry (1932)
- The Blue of Heaven (1932)
- Spies at the Savoy Hotel (1932)
- The Importance of Being Earnest (1932)
- The Testament of Cornelius Gulden (1932)
- No Day Without You (1933)
- Two Good Comrades (1933)
- The Castle in the South (1933)
- Every Day Isn't Sunday (1935)
- Trouble Backstairs (1935)
- Maria the Maid (1936)
- Lucky Kids (1936)
- Paul and Pauline (1936)
- Gasparone (1937)
- Woman's Love—Woman's Suffering (1937)
- Marionette (1939)
- Germanin (1943)
- Josef the Chaste (1953)
