= The Tsarevich (1933 film) =

1933 film

- German film poster
- German: Der Zarewitsch
- Directed by: Victor Janson
- Written by: Gabriela Zapolska (play); Bela Jenbach (libretto); Heinz Reichert (libretto); Georg Zoch
- Produced by: Edward Mühlert; Fritz Reinhardt
- Starring: Mártha Eggerth; Hans Söhnker; Ery Bos
- Cinematography: Karl Puth; Bruno Timm
- Edited by: Ludolf Grisebach; Roger von Norman
- Music by: Franz Lehár
- Production company: Prima-Tonfilm
- Distributed by: UFA
- Release date: 6 October 1933
- Running time: 87 minutes
- Country: Germany
- Language: German

The Tsarevich (German: Der Zarewitsch) is a 1933 German historical musical film directed by Victor Janson and starring Mártha Eggerth, Hans Söhnker and Ery Bos. It is based on the 1927 operetta Der Zarewitsch by Franz Lehar. It was one of a number of operetta film that Eggerth appeared in during the decade.

The film's sets were designed by Walter Haag and Franz Schroedter. A separate French-language version Son Altesse Impériale was also released.

== Cast ==
- Mártha Eggerth as Mary Collin
- Hans Söhnker as Der Zarewitsch
- Ery Bos as Prinzessin Dorothea
- Ida Wüst as Gräfin Landa
- Georg Alexander as Fürst Symoff
- Otto Wallburg as Graf Narkyn
- Anton Pointner as Ein Adjutant
- Paul Otto as Der Großfürst
- Max Gülstorff as Berthel
- Paul Heidemann as Iwan
- Hans Joachim Schaufuß as Stups

== See also ==
- The Tsarevich (1929)
- The Little Czar (1954)
