= Viennese Waltz (film) =

1932 film

- Directed by: Conrad Wiene
- Written by: Ernst Neubach (book); Stanley Ralph
- Produced by: Herbert Silbermann
- Starring: Michael Bohnen; Lee Parry; Paul Hörbiger
- Cinematography: Carl Drews
- Edited by: Oswald Hafenrichter; Gustav Lohse
- Music by: Hans May
- Production company: Splendid Film
- Distributed by: Omnium-Film
- Release date: 12 August 1932
- Running time: 103 minutes
- Country: Germany
- Language: German

Viennese Waltz or Johann Strauss, Royal and Imperial Court Musician (German: Johann Strauss, k. u. k. Hofkapellmeister) is a 1932 German historical musical film directed by Conrad Wiene and starring Michael Bohnen, Lee Parry and Paul Hörbiger.

The film's sets were designed by the art directors Wilhelm Depenau, Hans Ledersteger and Karl Machus. It was shot at the Johannisthal Studios in Berlin.

== Cast ==
- Michael Bohnen as Johann Strauß
- Lee Parry as Lilly Dumont
- Paul Hörbiger as Verleger Haslinger
- Gretl Theimer as Mizzi Enzinger
- Ekkehard Arendt as Joseph Strauß
- Max Schipper as Tipferl, Ministerialsekretär
- Anton Pointner as Graf Domsky
- Fritz Spira as Der Kaiser
- Hanns Waschatko as Minister
- Fritz Greiner as Theaterdirektor
- Alfred Abel
- Trude Hesterberg
- Jakob Tiedtke

== Bibliography ==
- Grange, William. Cultural Chronicle of the Weimar Republic. Scarecrow Press, 2008.
