= Enjoy Yourselves =

1934 film directed by Hans Steinhoff

- German film poster
- German: Freut Euch des Lebens
- Directed by: Hans Steinhoff
- Written by: Walter Forster; Eva Leidmann
- Produced by: Karl Ritter
- Starring: Dorit Kreysler; Ida Wüst; Wolfgang Liebeneiner
- Cinematography: Konstantin Irmen-Tschet
- Edited by: Milo Harbich
- Music by: Friedrich Wilhelm Rust
- Production company: UFA
- Distributed by: UFA
- Release date: 15 May 1934
- Running time: 91 minutes
- Country: Germany
- Language: German

Enjoy Yourselves (German: Freut Euch des Lebens) is a 1934 German musical comedy film directed by Hans Steinhoff and starring Dorit Kreysler, Ida Wüst and Wolfgang Liebeneiner. It was shot at the Tempelhof Studios in Berlin and on location in Bavaria. The film's sets were designed by the art directors Artur Günther and Benno von Arent. It premiered at the Ufa-Palast am Zoo in Berlin.

== Synopsis ==
Gusti is a popular waitress until one of the customers complains and she loses her job at the restaurant. She accompanies a friend on a trip to the resort town Zugspitze in the Bavarian Alps where she encounters the customer again and seeks to get her revenge on him.

== Cast ==
- Dorit Kreysler as Gusti Melzer, waitress at "Bratwurstglöckl"
- Ida Wüst as Camilla Raveck
- Wolfgang Liebeneiner as Carl Maria
- Leo Slezak as Gottfried Bumm, vocal pedagogue
- Eugen Rex as Emil Weissberg
- Anton Pointner as Igo von Lindstedt
- Gertrud Wolle as Frau Senkpiel

== Bibliography ==
- Rentschler, Eric. The Ministry of Illusion: Nazi Cinema and Its Afterlife. Harvard University Press, 1996.
