= Marta Eggerth =

Hungary-born American actress and singer (1912–2013)

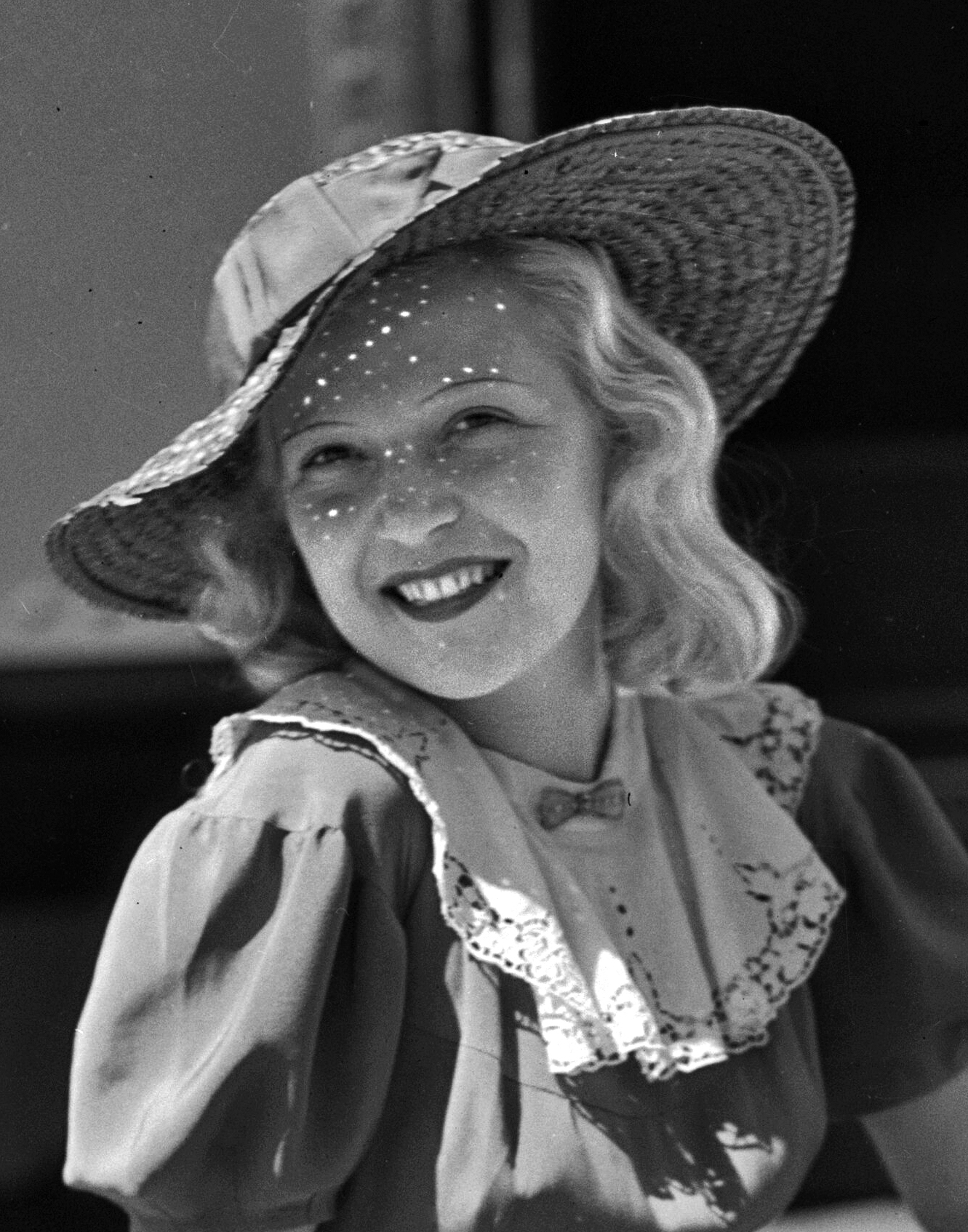
- Marta Eggerth in 1935
- Born: April 17, 1912; Budapest, Austria-Hungary (now Hungary)
- Died: December 26, 2013 (aged 101); Rye, New York, U.S.
- Occupations: Actress, singer
- Years active: 1923–2013
- Spouse: Jan Kiepura (m. 1936; died 1966)
- Children: 2

Marta Eggerth (April 17, 1912 – December 26, 2013) was a Hungarian-American actress and singer from "The Silver Age of Operetta".

A coloratura soprano, she was referred to as the "Callas of Operetta"

Many of the 20th century's most famous operetta composers, including Franz Lehár, Fritz Kreisler, Robert Stolz, Oscar Straus, and Paul Abraham, composed works especially for her.

== Early life ==
Márta Eggerth was born in Budapest, the daughter of Tilly (née Herzog, or Herzegh), a dramatic coloratura soprano, and Paul Eggerth, a bank director. Eggerth began singing during her early childhood. Her mother dedicated herself to her daughter, who was called a "Wunderkind" at the age of 11 making her theatrical debut in the operetta Mannequins. It was during this time and the years that followed that Eggerth began singing the most demanding coloratura repertoire by composers including Rossini, Meyerbeer, Offenbach and Johann Strauss II.

While still a teenager, Eggerth embarked on a tour of Denmark, Holland and Sweden before arriving in Vienna at the invitation of Emmerich Kálmán. Kálmán invited her to Vienna to understudy Adele Kern, the famous coloratura of the Vienna State Opera, in his operetta Das Veilchen vom Montmartre (The Violet of Montmartre). Eggerth eventually took over the title role to great critical acclaim after Kern suddenly became indisposed. Subsequently, Eggerth performed the role of Adele in Max Reinhardt's famous 1929 Hamburg production of Die Fledermaus at the age of 17.

== Career ==
During the early 1930s, Eggerth was discovered by the film industry, and her career took off resulting in international fame. She made more than 40 films in five languages: Hungarian, English, German, French and Italian. Among the highlights were, Where is this Lady (1932); Ein Lied, ein Kuss, ein Mädel (Berlin 1932, music Robert Stolz); The Csardas Princess (1934); The Blonde Carmen (Berlin 1935); Casta Diva, the story of Bellini (Rome 1935); Das Hofkonzert (1936); Zauber der Bohème, with Jan Kiepura (Vienna 1936, music Robert Stolz); as well as two films written especially for her by Franz Lehár, Es war einmal ein Walzer (1932) and Die ganze Welt dreht sich um Liebe (Vienna 1935). It was on the set of the 1934 film Mein Herz ruft immer nach dir (My Heart is Calling You, music Robert Stolz) that she met and fell in love with the young Polish tenor, Jan Kiepura. They were married in 1936 and together became known as Europe's Liebespaar (Love Pair) causing a sensation wherever they appeared.

On February 10, 1938, Jan Kiepura made his debut at New York's Metropolitan Opera, singing the role of Rodolfo in Puccini's La bohème. He went on to sing leading roles in Tosca, Rigoletto, Carmen, Manon, and Aida, as well as performing up to 80 concerts a year throughout the United States and Canada. While Kiepura toured the United States, Eggerth was signed by the Shubert Theatre on Broadway to appear in Richard Rodgers' musical Higher and Higher. She subsequently signed a contract with Metro-Goldwyn-Mayer in Hollywood and, during the early 1940s, made two movies with Judy Garland: For Me and My Gal in 1942 (also Gene Kelly's first major film role) and Presenting Lily Mars in 1943.

In Chicago, Eggerth and Kiepura performed together on the operatic stage in La bohème to rave reviews. In 1943, they starred together on Broadway at the Majestic Theater in a revised production of Lehár's The Merry Widow, with Robert Stolz conducting and choreography by George Balanchine. They would eventually perform The Merry Widow more than 2,000 times, in five languages throughout Europe and America. In 1945, they were back on Broadway together in the musical Polonaise. After World War II, they returned to France touring and making films, such as Valse Brillante (1949) and The Land of Smiles (1952), before bringing The Merry Widow to London's Palace Theatre in 1954.

Throughout her career, Eggerth maintained active recital tours throughout Europe, Canada and the United States, combining her extensive repertoire of lieder, opera, film songs, and especially Viennese operetta. Kiepura's equally active recital schedule often meant that the couple would be temporarily separated. But the couple's international tours often brought them together in the same city, where they would perform to delighted crowds. In London, they gave two sold-out concerts in one week at the Royal Albert Hall in 1956. The couple continued singing throughout the 1950s and 1960s with more productions of The Merry Widow in the United States, concerts and other productions in Europe. In 1965 they brought The Merry Widow back to Berlin for yet another successful run.

Kiepura died in 1966. Eggerth stopped singing at this time for several years. Finally, persuaded by her mother, she decided to revive her career. In the 1970s she began to make regular television appearances, and to actively perform concerts in Europe. In 1982, she returned to the American stage to co-star in the Tom Jones/Harvey Schmidt musical Colette opposite Diana Rigg in Seattle and Denver, and later in Stephen Sondheim's Follies in Pittsburgh.

In 1999, at the age of 87, she sang on the stage of the Vienna State Opera in a special televised matinée concert hosted by opera impresario and historian Marcel Prawy, to mark that opera house's first production of Lehár's The Merry Widow. She sang a medley from the operetta in four languages and received a spontaneous standing ovation. She repeated this medley in 2000, at a gala to mark the 200th anniversary of Vienna's Theater an der Wien.

In 2001, Eggerth returned to London for "An Interview-in-Concert" at a sold-out Wigmore Hall, accompanied by conductor-pianist Alexander Frey and hosted by British author and critic Brendan Carroll. She also sang at the annual Licia Albanese-Puccini Foundation concerts at Lincoln Center's Alice Tully Hall. She was seen in Austria on a popular television detective series, Tatort, playing the role of an aging diva suspected in a murder case. Appearances in 2006 and 2007 included two concerts with interviews at the Metropolitan Museum of Art; sold-out shows at the Café Sabarsky in Neue Galerie entertaining audiences with her pre-war Viennese/Berlin cabaret style of wit, artistry and song; a concert and discussion held as part of New York University's Osher Lifelong Learning Institutes; an appearance at the Austrian Cultural Forum as part of their Mostly Operetta series; operetta master classes at the Manhattan School of Music; and an appearance at the Jewish Association for Services for the Aged (JASA). Her last performance was at age 99 in 2011.

== Awards ==
Eggerth was awarded many major artistic decorations from Austria, Germany, Poland, and Italy in recognition of her accomplishments in operetta, theatre and film. Her final recognitions included the Knights Cross of the Order of the Merit of the Republic of Poland, Knights Cross of the Order of the Merit of the Republic of Hungary, her native land's highest honour, and the Erwin Piscator Life Achievement Award for her legendary achievements.

In 2003, Patria Music released a retrospective double CD of her songs entitled My Life My Song.

== Personal life ==
Eggerth was married to the Polish tenor Jan Kiepura.

== Death ==
Eggerth died on December 26, 2013 in Rye, New York. She was 101 years old.

== Films ==
- Csak egy kislány van a világon (1930)
- Die Bräutigamswitwe (Let's Love and Laugh, 1931)
- Trara um Liebe (1931)
- The Daredevil (1931)
- A Night at the Grand Hotel (1931)
- Modern Dowry (1932)
- Where Is This Lady? (1932)
- The Ladies Diplomat (1932)
- Ein Lied, ein Kuss, ein Mädel (1932)
- Once There Was a Waltz (1932)
- Traum von Schönbrunn (1932)
- The Blue of Heaven (1932)
- The Emperor's Waltz (1933)
- The Flower of Hawaii (1933)
- The Tsarevich (1933)
- Gently My Songs Entreat (1933)
- My Heart Calls You (1934)
- The Csardas Princess (1934)
- Unfinished Symphony (Leise flehen meine Lieder, 1934)
- Mon cœur t'appelle (1934)
- Ihr größter Erfolg (1934)
- The Divine Spark (1935)
- The Blonde Carmen (1935)
- My Heart Is Calling (1935)
- Casta diva (1935)
- The World's in Love (1935)
- La Chanson du souvenir (1936)
- The Castle in Flanders (1936)
- Where the Lark Sings (1936)
- The Court Concert (1936)
- The Charm of La Boheme (1937)
- Immer wenn ich glücklich bin..! (1938)
- For Me and My Gal (1942)
- Presenting Lily Mars (1943)
- Addio Mimí! (1947)
- Brilliant Waltz (1949)
- The Land of Smiles (1952)
- Spring in Berlin (1957)
