= Liska March =

American actress

Liska March (February 17, 1906 – May 30, 2003) was a dancer in the Ziegfeld Follies, an actress in motion pictures of the early sound era, and a producer of Broadway plays. March was born in St. Louis, Missouri and played in stock there prior to going to New York, New York. While in New York City Liska appeared in the Follies and also took part in Sunny, a play which featured actress Marilyn Miller. She died in 2003 at the age of 97.

== Career ==
She came to Hollywood, California to act in films in April 1929. Her first movie appearance was a role in support of Eddie Leonard in the Universal Pictures production, Melody Lane. She was in the cast of Koffer des Herrn O.F..Die (1931), a.k.a. The Trunks of Mr. O.F.. She once told a reporter that she never wanted a voice double in her film roles, commenting Wouldn't it be quite annoying if your voice would refuse to renew its contract and you would have to scurry around and find another one like it?

One of a select group of non-performers (or in her case, ex-performers) awarded membership in The Actors Studio, March was an associate producer of two original plays on Broadway during the 1950s. School For Scandal was the third production in a series presented by Terese Hayden. This was an 18th-century comedy which opened in June 1953 at the Theatre de Lys. Patricia Neal starred as Lady Teazle. Liska helped present The Genius and the Goddess, a 1957 Broadway play. Among the actors involved was child star Nancy Kelly. The setting for this one was a St. Louis living room in the years 1921 and 1922.

Miss March played a Sister of Mercy in The Ballad of Joe Hill (1971). She was among those who presented the movie at the Cannes Film Festival.

== Selected filmography ==
- The Trunks of Mr. O.F. (1931)
- Joe Hill (1971)
