= Hermann Blaß =

Austrian actor

- Born: 29 March 1888; Vienna, Austro-Hungarian Empire
- Died: 18 September 1941 (aged 53); New York City, United States
- Other name: Hermann Blass
- Occupation: Actor
- Years active: 1923–1940 (film)

Hermann Blaß (transliterated as Hermann Blass; 1888–1941) was an Austrian film actor and singer. The Jewish Blaß was forced to leave Germany following the rise of the Nazi Party to power in 1933. He then left Austria following its annexation by Germany in 1938 and went to the United States, where he died in 1941.

== Selected filmography ==
- War in Peace (1925)
- Dolly Gets Ahead (1930)
- The Singing City (1930)
- The Copper (1930)
- A Student's Song of Heidelberg (1930)
- The Road to Dishonour (1930)
- The Stolen Face (1930)
- Lieutenant, Were You Once a Hussar? (1930)
- Once I Loved a Girl in Vienna (1931)
- The Man in Search of His Murderer (1931)
- The Opera Ball (1931)
- The Little Escapade (1931)
- Circus Life (1931)
- Johnny Steals Europe (1932)
- Once There Was a Waltz (1932)
- Two Hearts Beat as One (1932)
- When Love Sets the Fashion (1932)
- Trenck (1932)
- Grandstand for General Staff (1932)
- Modern Dowry (1932)
- The Leap into the Void (1932)
- Scandal in Budapest (1933)
- Jumping into the Abyss (1933)
- Ball at the Savoy (1935)

== Bibliography ==
- Eisner, Lotte H. The Haunted Screen: Expressionism in the German Cinema and the Influence of Max Reinhardt. University of California Press, 1969.
