= A Night on the Danube =

1935 film directed by Carl Boese

- Directed by: Carl Boese
- Written by: Hans Gustl Kernmayr; Hanns Marschall
- Produced by: Felix Pfitzner
- Starring: Olga Engl; Wolfgang Liebeneiner; Gustav Waldau
- Cinematography: Willy Winterstein
- Edited by: Margarete Steinborn
- Music by: Willy Engel-Berger; Paul Hühn
- Production company: Cicero Film
- Distributed by: Panorama-Film
- Release date: 13 December 1935
- Country: Germany
- Language: German

A Night on the Danube (German: Eine Nacht an der Donau) is 1935 German comedy film directed by Carl Boese and starring Olga Engl, Wolfgang Liebeneiner, and Gustav Waldau. It was shot at the EFA Studios in Berlin and on location in Budapest and Vienna. The film's sets were designed by the art directors Emil Hasler and Arthur Schwarz.

== Cast ==
- Olga Engl as Fürstin Derlingen
- Wolfgang Liebeneiner as Wolfgang, ihr Sohn
- Gustav Waldau as Dr. Lerch, Erzieher
- Philipp Manning as Generalmusikdirektor
- Walter von Allwoerden as Diener im Hause Derlingen
- Dorit Kreysler as Steffi Eidinger, Primgeigerin der Kapelle 'Donauschwalben'
- Gertrud Faerber as Anni, zweite Geige
- Andrea Germann as Rosi, Cello und Posaune
- Lilo Hartmann as Resi, Streichbaß
- Kitty Meinhardt as Erna, Saxophon
- Elena Luber as Lisl, Schlagzeug
- Ilse von Collani as Poldi, Klavier
- Ida Wüst as Baronin von Szoboby
- Margit Symo as Ilonka, ihre Tochter
- Irmgard Wimmer as Roszi, Bedienerin
- Alfred von Schluga as Kellermeister
- Heinz Wemper as Kutscher
- Leo Slezak as Janos Török, Gastwirt
- Franz von Bokay as Jozsi, sein Sohn

== Bibliography ==
- Bock, Hans-Michael; Bergfelder, Tim, eds. (2009). The Concise Cinegraph: Encyclopaedia of German Cinema. New York: Berghahn Books. ISBN 978-1-57181-655-9.
- Klaus, Ulrich J. Deutsche Tonfilme: Jahrgang 1935. Klaus-Archiv, 1988.
