= Brilliant Waltz =

1949 film

- Directed by: Jean Boyer
- Written by: Gérard Carlier; Herbert Victor; Serge Véber
- Produced by: Robert Tarcali
- Starring: Mártha Eggerth; Jan Kiepura; Lucien Baroux
- Cinematography: Léonce-Henri Burel
- Edited by: Fanchette Mazin
- Music by: Norbert Glanzberg; Roger Lucchesi
- Production companies: Consortium du Film; Vox Films
- Release date: 2 December 1949
- Running time: 95 minutes
- Country: France
- Language: French

Brilliant Waltz (French: Valse brillante) is a 1949 French musical crime film directed by Jean Boyer and starring Mártha Eggerth, Jan Kiepura and Lucien Baroux. It was shot at the Boulogne Studios in Paris. The film's sets were designed by the art director Lucien Aguettand.

== Synopsis ==
After a series of admirers of the singer Martha Vassary are attacked, the impresario has the idea of recruiting a famous tenor to act as her bodyguard.

== Cast ==
- Mártha Eggerth as Martha Vassary
- Jan Kiepura as Jan Kovalski
- Lucien Baroux as Monsieur DeBosc, impresario
- Roger Tréville as Hubert de Tiffauges
- Arlette Merry as Lolita
- Jean Hébey as Le directeur
- Jacques Mercier as Le garçon d'ascenseur
- Pierre Destailles as Le voyou
- Léon Berton as Paulo
- Joé Davray as Un pochard
- Bob Ingarao as Un pochard
- Jacques Beauvais as Le maître d'hôtel
- Janine Clairville
- Annie Avril

== Bibliography ==
- Fawkes, Richard (2000). Opera on Film. London: Duckworth. ISBN 978-0-7156-2943-7.
