= Ida Wüst =

German actress (1884–1958)

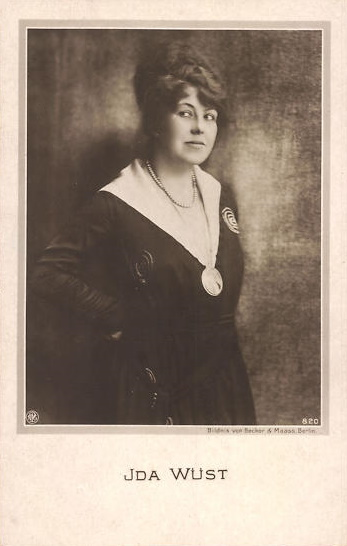
- Ida Wüst c. 1922
- Born: 10 October 1884; Frankfurt am Main, German Empire
- Died: 4 October 1958 (aged 73); West Berlin, West Germany
- Occupation: Actress
- Years active: 1900–1956
- Spouse: Bruno Kastner (m. 1918; div. 1924)

Ida Wüst (German: [iː.da vyːst]; 10 October 1884 – 4 October 1958) was a German stage and film actress whose career was prominent in the 1920s and 1930s with Universum Film AG (UFA).

== Life and career ==
Little is known about Ida Wüst's early childhood. She discovered early the world of theater, and decided to make it her career. After attending secondary school in Frankfurt am Main, Wüst took acting lessons from Thessa Klinghammer and at the age of 16 received her first engagement at the StadtTheatre of Colmar, and further stage productions in Bromberg, and in 1904 performed extensively in Leipzig. In 1907 she became a member of the ensemble of the Lessing-Theater in Berlin, where she performed roles in Hosenrollen (roles in which women impersonate men in trousers), and comedies and became sought after actress.

She befriended and married actor Bruno Kastner, with whom she began writing screenplays. The couple married in 1918, divorced in 1924, and had no children.

Wüst appeared in the four-silent serial installments of Tragedy of Love and The Countess of Paris in 1923, which also featured a young Marlene Dietrich. Many other silent movies quickly followed and Wüst's film career of the silent era was prolific. She transitioned to the sound era of the talkie with relative ease and appeared in many stage and film production during the 1930s.

World War II brought a slump in Wüst's career. During the war years she played in only several film and theater roles.

Following the war, Wüst's 1946 request for denazification was dismissed because during the Nazi regime, she was accused of denouncing fellow actors such as Eduard von Winterstein. Wüst was known to have corresponded with Adolf Hitler throughout the war years and several of her letters to Hitler are on file at the Princeton University Adolf Hitler Collection. Only in 1949 was Wüst classified as suitable to resume her career. During the 1950s, she made several films, often appearing as sprightly elderly ladies and comedic matronly types. Also, during the 1950s, she again returned to the stage.

During her career, Ida Wüst appeared opposite some of the most notable stars of the German cinema, such as: Heinz Rühmann, Hans Albers, Peter Lorre, Paul Henckels, Käthe Dorsch, Hans Moser, Käthe Haack, Paul Kemp, Theo Lingen and many more.

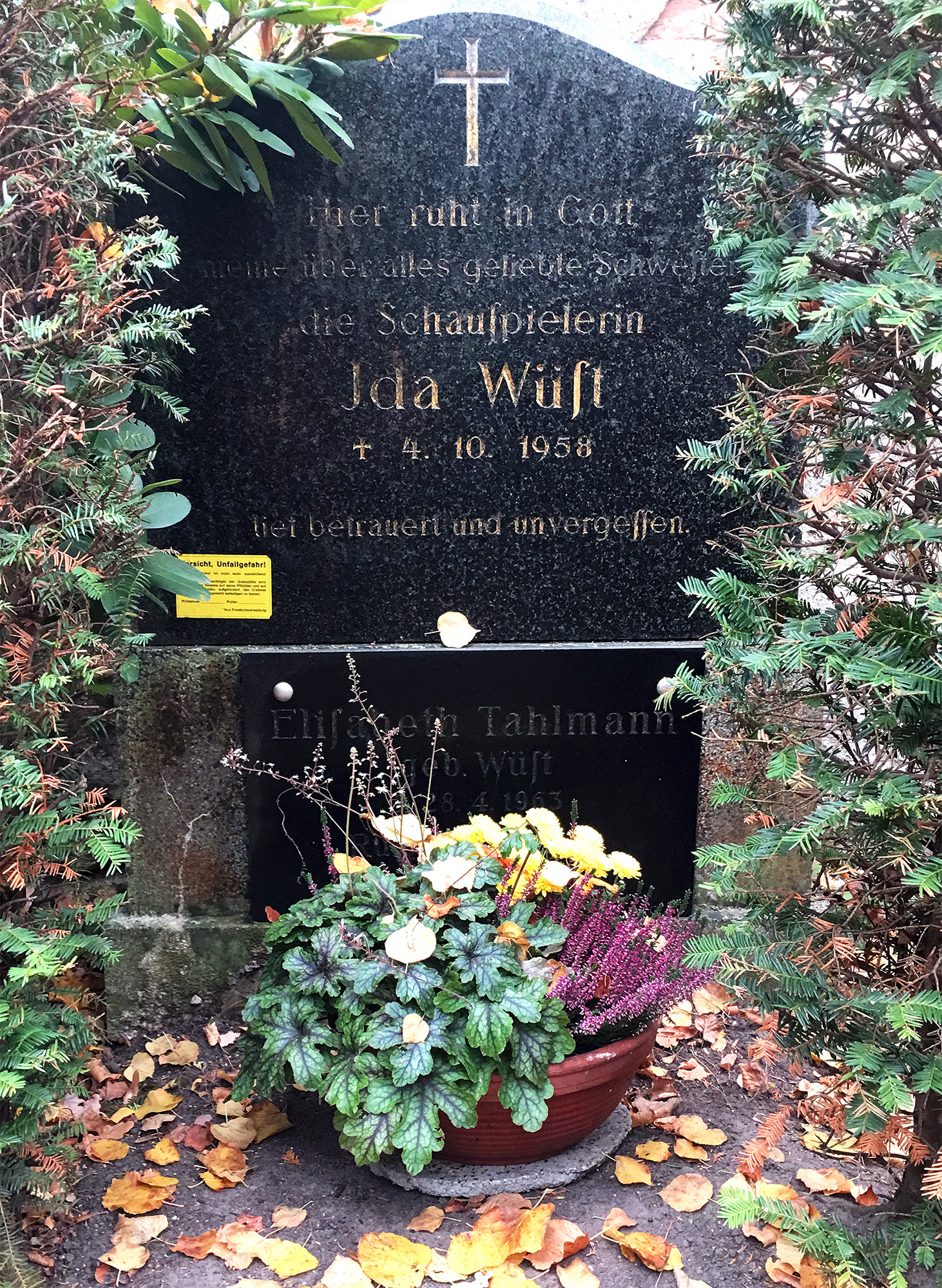
Grave of Ida Wüst in Groß Glienicke.

On 4 October 1958 Ida Wüst died of a stroke, following a severe bout of pneumonia, aged 73. She was buried at the Evangelical Lutheran parish church cemetery in Groß Glienicke, Brandenburg.

== Filmography ==
As a screenwriter

- Only a Servant (1919)
- Der König von Paris Teil 1 & 2 (1920)

As an actress

- Der wird geheiratet (1921)
- Marquise von Pompadour (1922)
- Tragedy of Love (1923)
- The Countess of Paris (1923)
- The Doll Queen (1925)
- Chamber Music (1925)
- Oh Those Glorious Old Student Days (1925)
- Die vertauschte Braut (1925)
- Die Strasse des Vergessens (1925)
- The Queen of the Baths (1926)
- The Third Squadron (1926)
- Accommodations for Marriage (1926)
- Unmarried Daughters (1926)
- Die Bräutigame der Babette (1927)
- Das Heiratsnest (1927)
- Excluded from the Public (1927)
- Homesick (1927)
- Venus im Frack (1927)
- Im Luxuszug (1927)
- Assassination (1927)
- Mein Freund Harry (1927)
- The Last Waltz (1927)
- Queen Louise (1927)
- Der Bettelstudent (1927)
- The Case of Prosecutor M (1928)
- Die Königin seines Herzens (1928)
- It Attracted Three Fellows (1928)
- The Abduction of the Sabine Women (1928)
- Master and Mistress (1928)
- Youth of the Big City (1929)
- The Burning Heart (1929)
- Father and Son (1929)
- Diary of a Coquette (1929)
- Fräulein Fähnrich (1929)
- Madame X, die Frau für diskrete Beratung (1929)
- Zwischen vierzehn und siebzehn
- The Night Belongs to Us (1929)
- Der Walzerkönig (1930)
- Die Lindenwirtin (1930)
- A Student's Song of Heidelberg (1930)
- Rooms to Let (1930)
- Three Days Confined to Barracks (1930)
- The Caviar Princess (1930)
- Die Scikosbaroness (1930)
- Josef the Chaste (1930)
- Bockbierfest (1930)
- Das alte Lied (1930)
- Marriage in Name Only (1930)
- Madame Pompadour (1931)
- Different Morals (1931)
- When the Soldiers (1931)
- The Firm Gets Married (1931)
- Der Stumme von Portici (1931)
- Das verlorene Paradies (1931)
- Elisabeth of Austria (1931)
- Bombs on Monte Carlo (1931)
- My Leopold (1931)
- Der verjüngte Adolar (1931)
- Shooting Festival in Schilda (1931)
- Hooray, It's a Boy! (1931)
- Schön ist die Manöverzeit (1931)
- The Night Without Pause (1931)
- Two Heavenly Blue Eyes (1932)
- At Your Orders, Sergeant (1932)
- The Victor (1932)
- No Money Needed (1932)
- Once There Was a Waltz (1932)
- Peter Voss, Thief of Millions (1932)
- Melody of Love (1932)
- Aus einer kleinen Residenz (1932)
- The Song of Night (1932)
- Ballhaus goldener Engel (1932)
- Two Lucky Days (1932)
- Ja, treu ist die Soldatenliebe (1932)
- The Beautiful Adventure (1932)
- The Testament of Cornelius Gulden (1932)
- Mieter Schulze gegen alle (1932)
- How Shall I Tell My Husband? (1932)
- Frederica (1932)
- The Invisible Front (1932)
- I by Day, You by Night (1932)
- You Don't Forget Such a Girl (1932)
- Keinen Tag ohne Dich (1933)
- A Song for You (1933)
- Kind, ich freu' mich auf Dein Kommen (1933)
- Little Man, What Now? (1933)
- Laughing Heirs (1933)
- Refugees (1933)
- Fräulein Hoffmanns Erzählungen (1933)
- Die Wette (1933)
- The Tsarevich (1933)
- Young Dessau's Great Love (1933)
- Charley's Aunt (1934)
- Just Once a Great Lady (1934)
- Annette im Paradies (1934)
- Frühlingsmärchen (1934)
- Enjoy Yourselves (1934)
- The Csardas Princess (1934)
- The Daring Swimmer (1934)
- Jungfrau gegen Mönch 1934
- Love and the First Railway (1934)
- Warum lügt Fräulein Käthe? (1935)
- The Blonde Carmen (1935)
- The Private Life of Louis XIV (1935)
- Kater Lampe (1935)
- The World's in Love (1935)
- If It Were Not for Music (1935)
- Eine Seefahrt, die ist lustig (1935)
- Herbstmanöver (1935)
- A Night on the Danube (1935)
- The Merry Wives (1936)
- Kater Lampe (1936)
- The Beggar Student (1936)
- Nachtwache im Paradies (1936)
- A Wedding Dream (1936)
- Der lustige Witwenball (1936)
- Heiratsinstitut Ida & Co. (1937)
- Husaren, heraus (1937)
- Fremdenheim Filoda (1937)
- Wenn Du eine Schwiegermutter hast (1937)
- The Beaver Coat (1937)
- Es leuchten die Sterne (1937–1939)
- Diskretion – Ehrensache (1938)
- Das Verlegenheitskind (1938)
- Little County Court (1938)
- Rote Mühle (1939)
- Die kluge Schwiegermutter (1939)
- Two Worlds (1940)
- Die unvollkommenen Liebe (1940)
- Wunschkonzert (1940)
- Happiness is the Main Thing (1941)
- His Son (1942)
- Beloved Darling (1943)
- Die beiden Schwestern (1943)
- The Noltenius Brothers (1945)
- Law of Love (1949)
- When Men Cheat (1950)
- Eva im Frack (1950)
- Heimat, Deine Sterne (1951)
- It Began at Midnight (1951)
- Der Jagerloisl vom Tegernsee (1951)
- I'm Waiting for You (1952)
- Aunt Jutta from Calcutta (1953)
- The Sweetest Fruits (1954)
- Sonne über der Adria (1954)
- Die Barrings (1955)
- The Mistress of Solderhof (1955)
- Roter Mohn (1956)

Selected theater performances

- Kammermusik (Lessing-Theater, Berlin, 1914)
- Drei arme kleine Mädels (Theater am Nollendorfplatz, Berlin, 1927)
- Die Männer sind nicht dankbar (Kabarett Simpl, Vienna, Austria, 1940)
