= Dreams Come True (film) =

1936 British film by Reginald Denham

- Trade show advertisement (The Daily Film Renter, 16 October 1936)
- Directed by: Reginald Denham
- Written by: Bela Jenbach (operetta); Bruce Sievier (operetta); Donald Bull
- Produced by: John W. Gossage; Ilja Salkind
- Starring: Frances Day; Nelson Keys; Hugh Wakefield; Marie Lohr
- Cinematography: Otto Heller
- Edited by: Ray Pitt
- Music by: Franz Lehár (operetta); Colin Wark; Ben Frankel
- Production companies: London & Continental Films
- Distributed by: Reunion Films
- Release date: December 1936
- Running time: 78 minutes
- Country: United Kingdom
- Language: English

Dreams Come True (also known as The World Is Mine) is a 1936 British musical film directed by Reginald Denham and starring Frances Day, Nelson Keys and Hugh Wakefield. The film is based on the 1924 operetta Clo-Clo by Franz Lehár and Bela Jenbach in an English adaptation by Bruce Sievier. It was made at Ealing Studios. An Austrian version of the story, The World's in Love, had been released the previous year.

== Plot ==
Ilona Ratkay is a Viennese actress romantically involved with Peter, the son of wealthy Adalbert von Waldenau. When a publicity agent spreads a fake story claiming that Ilona is the daughter of a famous dancer, Adalbert, having been one of the dancer's many lovers, thinks Ilona is his daughter, and tries to stop her relationship with Peter.

== Cast ==
- Frances Day as Ilona Ratkay
- Nelson Keys as Anton
- Hugh Wakefield as Adalbert von Waldenau
- Marie Lohr as Helen von Waldenau
- Frederick Bradshaw as Peter
- Morris Harvey as Waldemar
- Arthur Finn as manager
- Minnie Rayner as dresser

== Reception ==
The Monthly Film Bulletin wrote: "Lehar's simple melodies are still refreshing, but the old humour sounds rather quaint. Laughter and music, backstage, cabaret, and rural relaxation – these are the main ingredients. Frances Day, as the cabaret star, is seldom off the screen, and her talent, even with thin sentimental material, is considerable."

The Daily Film Renter wrote: "Frances Day turns in snappy portrayal, giving piquant point to series of amusing situations, and rendering tuneful Lehar melodies on occasion. Attractive Viennese theatre, restaurant and rustic exterior backgrounds, form principal locations, while Nelson Keys and Hugh Wakefield afford star capital support. Pleasant light entertainment of popular vintage."

== See also ==
- The World's in Love (1935)
