= The Trunks of Mr. O.F. =

1931 film

- German film poster
- German: Die Koffer des Herrn O.F.
- Directed by: Alexis Granowsky
- Written by: Alexis Granowsky; Hans Hömberg; Léo Lania
- Produced by: Mark Asarow; Hans Conradi; Ernst Nölle
- Starring: Alfred Abel; Peter Lorre; Harald Paulsen; Hedy Lamarr
- Cinematography: Heinrich Balasch; Reimar Kuntze
- Edited by: Paul Falkenberg; Conrad von Molo
- Music by: Karol Rathaus; Kurt Schröder
- Production company: Tobis Film
- Distributed by: Deutsche Lichtspiel-Syndikat
- Release date: 2 December 1931
- Running time: 80 minutes
- Country: Germany
- Language: German

The Trunks of Mr. O.F. (German: Die Koffer des Herrn O.F.) is a 1931 German comedy film directed by Alexis Granowsky and starring Alfred Abel, Peter Lorre, and Harald Paulsen. Produced by Tobis Film, it was made at the Johannisthal Studios in Berlin with sets designed by the art director Erich Czerwonski. The film was shot between 15 September and 17 October 1931 and premiered in Berlin's Mozartsaal on 2 December 1931. The film was then heavily cut down to a shorter running time, and re-released under the alternative title Building and Marrying (Bauen und heiraten). It received its Viennese premiere on 4 June 1932.

It received a mixed reception from critics who were divided over its non-realist, fantastical elements. The film's screenwriter Léo Lania intended it to be a critique of capitalism.

== Plot ==
When thirteen large suitcases arrive at a hotel in a small town, labeled as belonging to a mysterious O.F., they provoke curiosity and speculation. Rumours begin to spread that they belong to a millionaire. Although O.F. fails to appear, his anticipated arrival is a catalyst for a series of dramatic changes in the town.

== Cast ==
- Alfred Abel as mayor
- Peter Lorre as Stix, editor
- Harald Paulsen as Baumeister Stark
- Ludwig Stössel as Hotelier Brunn
- Hedy Lamarr (as Hedwig Kiesler) as Helene - mayor's daughter
- Margo Lion as Viola Volant
- Ilse Korseck as Mayor's Wife
- Liska March as Eve Lune
- Gaby Karpeles as Eve Lune's helper
- Hadrian Maria Netto as hairdresser Jean
- Hertha von Walther as Jeans Frau
- Franz Weber as Schneider Dorn
- Maria Karsten as Frau Dorn
- Alfred Döderlein as Alexander, mayor's son
- Bernhard Goetzke as Prof. Smith
- Josefine Dora as Jean's mother-in-law
- Friedrich Ettel as Pharmacist
- Aenne Goerling as Beck, landlord
- Rudolf Hofbauer as Film director
- Arthur Mainzer as Film director's assistant
- Meinhart Maur as doctor
- Aribert Mog as Assistant von Stark
- Max Ralph-Ostermann as butler
- Henry Pleß as bank manager
- Gertrud Ober as bank manager's secretary
- Eduard Rothauser as Travel Agency director
- Elsa Wagner as Secretary of the Travel Agency director
- Hans Hermann Schaufuß as Peter, valet
- Franz Schönemann as Agency director
- Gerta Rozan as Agency director's first secretary
- Ursula Urdang as Agency director's second secretary
- Fanny Schreck as Dorn's mother-in-law
- Franz Stein as music teacher
- Ernst Wurmser as conductor of the Fire Brigade band
- Maria Forescu as abusive mother
- Eva L'Arronge as Perfumery manufacturer's secretary
- Hanns Waschatko as Perfumery manufacturer
