= The Blonde Carmen =

1935 film

- Directed by: Victor Janson
- Written by: Roland Schacht (play); Hans H. Zerlett
- Produced by: Arnold Pressburger; Gregor Rabinovitch
- Starring: Martha Eggerth; Wolfgang Liebeneiner; Ida Wüst
- Cinematography: Reimar Kuntze
- Edited by: Roger von Norman
- Music by: Franz Grothe
- Production company: Cine-Allianz Tonfilm
- Distributed by: Rota-Film
- Release date: 7 August 1935
- Running time: 101 minutes
- Country: Germany
- Language: German

The Blonde Carmen (German: Die blonde Carmen) is a 1935 German musical comedy film directed by Victor Janson and starring Martha Eggerth, Wolfgang Liebeneiner, and Ida Wüst. It is part of the tradition of operetta films. It was shot at the Johannisthal Studios in Berlin. The film's sets were designed by the art directors Wilhelm Depenau and Erich Zander. It was distributed by Rota-Film, a subsidiary of the large Tobis Film concern.

== Synopsis ==
A Hungarian opera star from Budapest decides to take a holiday in the Bavarian Alps. While there she pretends to be a simple peasant girl.

== Cast ==
- Martha Eggerth as Maria Barkas
- Wolfgang Liebeneiner as Josef Lechner, Schriftsteller
- Ida Wüst as Ilka Földesy
- Leo Slezak as Otto Bachmeier, Composer
- Hans Leibelt as Max Kruse, Theaterdirector
- Else Kochhan as Paula Kannegießer
- Ellen Frank as Actress Lilli Costa
- Josef Eichheim as Der alte Stadler
- Kurt Vespermann as Der Regisseur

== Bibliography ==
- Bock, Hans-Michael; Bergfelder, Tim, eds. (2009). The Concise Cinegraph: Encyclopaedia of German Cinema. New York: Berghahn Books. ISBN 978-1-57181-655-9.
- Zanger, Anat (2006). Film Remakes as Ritual and Disguise: From Carmen to Ripley. Amsterdam: Amsterdam University Press. ISBN 978-90-5356-784-5.
