= The Merry Wives (1936 film) =

1936 film directed by Carl Hoffmann

- Directed by: Carl Hoffmann
- Written by: Georg Zoch
- Based on: The Merry Wives of Windsor by William Shakespeare
- Produced by: Martin Pichert
- Starring: Magda Schneider; Leo Slezak; Ida Wüst
- Cinematography: Günther Anders
- Edited by: Lothar Buhle
- Music by: Franz Grothe
- Production company: Cine-Allianz
- Distributed by: Rota Film
- Release date: 24 January 1936
- Running time: 81 minutes
- Country: Germany
- Language: German

The Merry Wives (German: Die lustigen Weiber) is a 1936 German comedy film directed by Carl Hoffmann and starring Magda Schneider, Leo Slezak and Ida Wüst. It is based on William Shakespeare's play The Merry Wives of Windsor. It was shot at the Halensee Studios in Berlin. The film's sets were designed by the art directors Wilhelm Depenau and Erich Zander.

== Cast ==
- Magda Schneider as Viola Evans
- Leo Slezak as Sir John Falstaff
- Ida Wüst as Frau Fluth/Mistress Ford
- Maria Krahn as Frau Hurtig/Mistress Page
- Ellen Frank as Frl. Betty White
- Otto Wernicke as Herr Fluth/Frank Ford
- Franz Zimmermann as Valentin Fluth
- Helmut Weiss as Junker Schwächling
- Helmut Hoffmann as Fenton
- Gustav Püttjer as Pistol
- Erwin van Roy as Nym
- Armin Schweizer as Herr Page
- Ruth Claus as Anne Page
- Eduard Wenck as Mr. Burns
- Else Reval as Mrs. Burns
- Wolfgang von Schwindt as Wirt
- Aribert Grimmer as Bardolf
- Klaus Pohl as Wächter am Stadttor u. Nachtwächter
- Curt Ackermann as Ponton
- Willi Schaeffers as Friedensrichter
- Kurt Lauermann as Higgins Bote
- Arthur Reppert as Kutscher v. Heuwagen
- Horst Birr as Oberpage Pedro

== Bibliography ==
- Bock, Hans-Michael & Bergfelder, Tim. The Concise CineGraph. Encyclopedia of German Cinema. Berghahn Books, 2009.
- Klaus, Ulrich J. Deutsche Tonfilme: Jahrgang 1936. Klaus-Archiv, 1988.
- Sammons, Eddie. Shakespeare: A Hundred Years on Film. Bloomsbury Academic, 2004.
