= Father and Son (1929 German film) =

1929 film directed by Géza von Bolváry

- Directed by: Géza von Bolváry
- Written by: Franz Schulz
- Produced by: Marcel Hellman
- Starring: Harry Liedtke; Rolf von Goth; Charles Puffy; Ruth Weyher
- Cinematography: Willy Goldberger
- Production company: Deutsche Lichtspiel-Syndikat
- Distributed by: Deutsche Lichtspiel-Syndikat
- Release date: 24 October 1929
- Country: Germany
- Languages: Silent; German intertitles

Father and Son (German: Vater und Sohn) is a 1929 German silent film directed by Géza von Bolváry and starring Harry Liedtke, Rolf von Goth, and Charles Puffy. The film's art direction was by Robert Neppach and Erwin Scharf.

== Cast ==
- Harry Liedtke as Jean Bonnard
- Rolf von Goth as Marcel Bonnard
- Charles Puffy as Epstein
- Ruth Weyher as Madame Tibot
- Marie Glory as Stella Valéry
- Anton Pointner as Monsieur Tibot
- Ida Wüst as Bonnards Wirtschafterin
- Yvette Darnys as Fifi
- Charlotte Susa as Nanon
- Jim Gérald as Tibot's Lawyer

== Bibliography ==
- Prawer, Siegbert Salomon (2005). Between Two Worlds: The Jewish Presence in German and Austrian Film, 1910–1933. New York: Berghahn Books. ISBN 978-1-84545-074-8.
