= The Stolen Face =

1930 film

- Directed by: Philipp Lothar Mayring; Erich Schmidt
- Written by: Philipp Lothar Mayring; Irma von Cube
- Produced by: Bruno Duday
- Starring: Hans Otto; Friedl Haerlin; Max Adalbert
- Cinematography: Werner Bohne; Eugen Schüfftan
- Music by: Hans May
- Production company: UFA
- Distributed by: UFA
- Release date: 10 November 1930
- Running time: 84 minutes
- Country: Germany
- Language: German

The Stolen Face (German: Das gestohlene Gesicht) is a 1930 German crime film directed by Philipp Lothar Mayring and Erich Schmidt, starring Hans Otto, Friedl Haerlin and Max Adalbert.

The film's sets were designed by the art director Werner Schlichting. It was shot on location in Berlin and Hamburg.

== Cast ==
- Hans Otto as Bill
- Fritz Lequis as Kriminalrat Keller
- Edith Edwards as Lore Falk
- Friedl Haerlin as Roselle
- Max Adalbert as Murrjahn
- Hermann Blaß as Lewinsohn
- Frigga Braut as Fraeulein Tausendschoen
- Paul Henckels as Professor Wrede
- Fritz Odemar as Hempel
- Otto Laubinger as Bellamico
- Julius E. Herrmann as Kommissar Knaegge
- Heinz Glahn as Dr. Steffensohn
- Erika Unruh as Lehrerin
- Olivia Fried as Cölestine
- Théo Tony as Franzose
- Ernst Pröckl as Reporter
- Erich Kestin as Photograph
- Hermann Vallentin as Wirt
- Margitta Zonewa as Zigeunerin
- Ferdinand Hart as Wachtmeister Enke
- Paul Rehkopf as Museumsführer

== Bibliography ==
- Bock, Hans-Michael & Bergfelder, Tim. The Concise Cinegraph: Encyclopaedia of German Cinema. Berghahn Books, 2009.
