= The World's in Love =

- Directed by: Viktor Tourjansky
- Written by: Bela Jenbach (libretto)
- Produced by: Ernst Mosich
- Starring: Mártha Eggerth; Leo Slezak; Ida Wüst
- Cinematography: Werner Brandes
- Edited by: Hans Wolff
- Music by: Franz Lehár (operetta); Willy Schmidt-Gentner
- Production company: Standard-Film
- Distributed by: Kiba Kinobetriebsanstalt
- Release date: 4 October 1935
- Running time: 93 minutes
- Country: Austria
- Language: German

The World's in Love (German: Die ganze Welt dreht sich um Liebe) is a 1935 Austrian comedy film directed by Viktor Tourjansky and starring Mártha Eggerth, Leo Slezak and Ida Wüst. It is based on the operetta Clo-Clo. The film's sets were designed by the art director Julius von Borsody. It was remade in Britain the following year as Dreams Come True.

== Cast ==
- Mártha Eggerth as Ilona Ratkay
- Leo Slezak as Adalbert v. Waldenau
- Ida Wüst as Helene, seine Frau
- Rolf Wanka as Peter, sein Sohn
- Hans Moser as Anton, Diener im Hause Waldenau
- Alfred Neugebauer as W.G. Miller
- Annie Rosar as Frau Ringelmann, Garderobiere bei Ilona Ratkay
- Richard Waldemar as T. von Halmay
- Phillis Fehr
- Eduard Loibner
- Karl Skraup
- Felix Dombrowsky
- Franz Schimmerl as Franzi
- Flottwell
- Landau
- Oskar Pouché
- Schmidtek
- Viktor Staal
- Karl Staudt
- Rudolf Stiaßny

== Critical reception ==
Writing for The Spectator in 1936, Graham Greene gave the film a neutral review, describing it as a "devastatingly gay film". Greene praised the comedic interplay between Leo Slezak and Hans Moser, however he designed to praise Mártha Eggerth for her performance explaining that he had a peculiar antipathy toward her acting.

== See also ==
- Dreams Come True (1936)

== Bibliography ==
- Waldman, Harry. Nazi Films in America, 1933-1942. McFarland, 2008.
