= Leo Slezak =

Austrian opera singer (1873–1946)

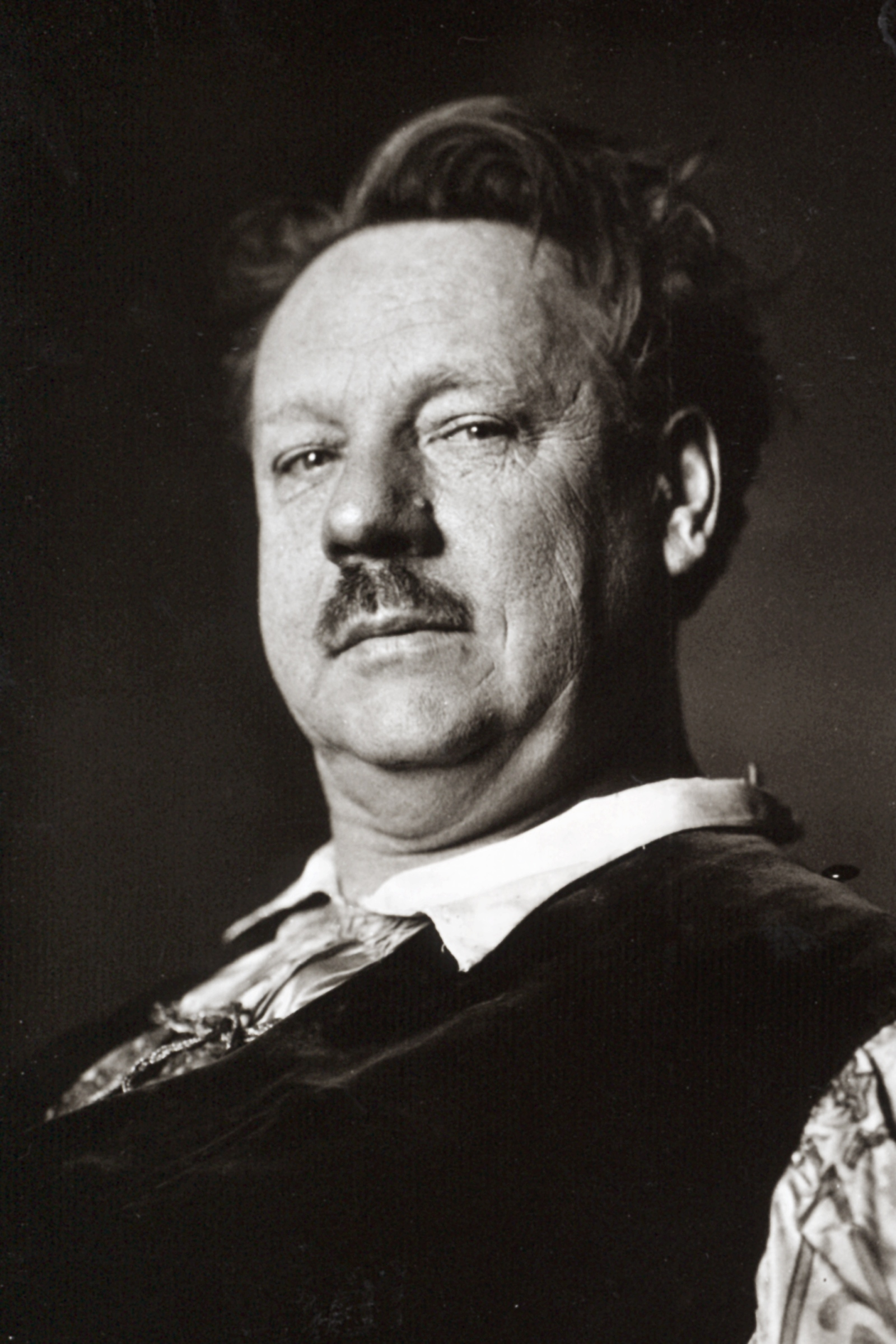
Leo Slezak, c. 1927

Leo Slezak (German pronunciation: [ˌleːo ˈslɛzak]; 18 August 1873 – 1 June 1946) was an Austrian dramatic tenor. He was associated in particular with Austrian opera as well as the title role in Verdi's Otello. He is the father of actors Walter Slezak and Margarete Slezak and grandfather of the actress Erika Slezak.

"Morgenlich leuchtend im rosigen Schein" (Walther's Prize song)
From Richard Wagner's Die Meistersinger von Nürnberg. Sung by Leo Slezak in 1910 for Edison Records

== Life and work ==
=== Early years ===
Born in Šumperk (German: Mährisch-Schönberg), northern Moravia (then part of the Austria-Hungary), as the son of a miller, Slezak worked briefly as a blacksmith, an engineer's fitter and served in the army before taking singing lessons with the first-class baritone and pedagogue Adolf Robinson. He made his debut in 1896 in Brno (Brünn) and proceeded to sing leading roles in Bohemia and Germany, appearing at Breslau and, in 1898–99, at Berlin. From 1901 onwards he was a permanent member of the Vienna State Opera's roster of artists, achieving star status.

While in Vienna he was initiated into Freemasonry.

=== International career ===
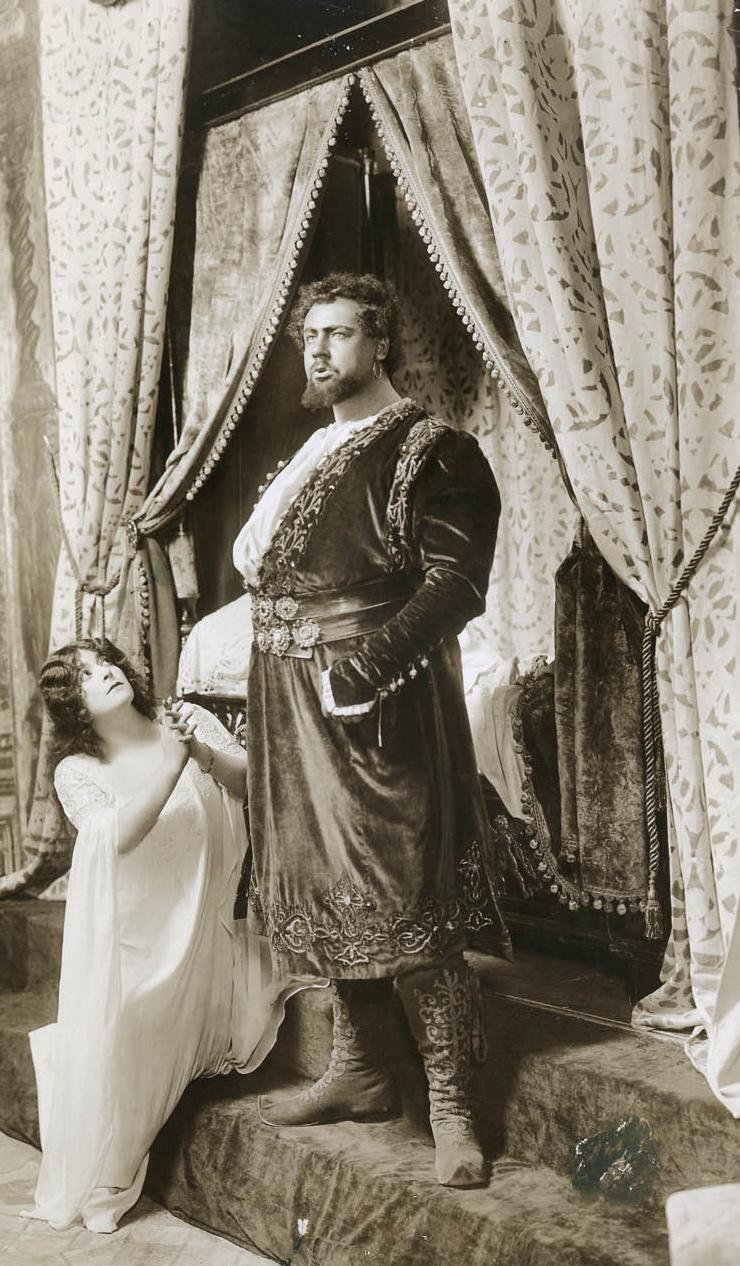
Frances Alda as Desdemona and Slezak in the title role of Verdi's Otello at the Metropolitan Opera in 1909.

Slezak's international career commenced in London at the Royal Opera House, Covent Garden, where he sang Siegfried (a punishing role that he would soon drop from his repertoire) and Lohengrin in 1900. (He would return to Covent Garden in 1909 after undertaking further vocal studies in Paris the previous year with a great tenor of a previous era, Jean de Reszke.)

Slezak secured a three-year contract with the New York Metropolitan Opera in 1909. Met audiences acclaimed him in performances of works by Wagner and Verdi. Along with Italy's Giovanni Zenatello, he became one of the most famous Otellos of his generation, famously performing the role at the Met with Arturo Toscanini conducting.

Many anecdotes reveal his sense of humour. The best-known being, during a performance of Wagner's Lohengrin, a stage hand pulled the swan off the stage too early, before the tenor could hop aboard. Seeing his feathered transportation disappear into the wings, Slezak ad-libbed to the audience: "Wann fährt der nächste Schwan?" ("When does the next swan leave?").

Slezak had a versatile repertory, which embraced 66 roles. They included Rossini's Guillaume Tell, Manrico, Radames, Walter, Tannhäuser, Hermann, as well as Otello and Lohengrin. He sang 44 roles in Vienna alone, where he made 936 stage appearances in 1901–12 and 1917–27 and gained considerable fame.

=== Vocal characteristics ===
A tall, robust physique man, Slezak possessed a large, lyric-dramatic voice, attributes that allowed him to perform the majority of the Wagnerian repertoire, with the exception of the heaviest roles such as Tristan and Siegfried. He had a distinctive timbre, which became markedly darker after his studies with Jean de Reszke in 1908. Technically, Slezak’s singing was characterized by the use of mezza voce and the employment of head tones.

He made hundreds of disc and cylinder recordings, beginning in the early 1900s and ending in the 1930s. They were produced by several different record companies and include arias, duets and songs by a wide selection of composers, ranging from Mozart to Wagner. Most of his best records have been released on CD compilations. Some of his film work as an actor survives as well.

== Books ==
Slezak's autobiography, published in 1938 in English as Song of Motley: Being the Reminiscences of a Hungry Tenor, contains pen-portraits of many of the musicians and artists with whom he worked, including Gustav Mahler, Arturo Toscanini and Cosima Wagner. It describes his tours of America, Russia and the Balkans and recalls his doomed audition for Frau Wagner at Bayreuth, when he foolishly chose to sing music from Pagliacci.

Later in life, he published several very humorous, semi-autobiographical books, notably:

- Meine sämtlichen Werke ("All of my works"), his first book
- Der Wortbruch ("The broken promise")
- Der Rückfall ("The relapse")
- Leo Slezak by Dr. Christopher Norton-Welsh, with discography by Alex Weggen in "Étude" n° 27, July–August–September 2004 (Association internationale de chant lyrique TITTA RUFFO).

== Films ==
In 1932, Slezak began appearing in German cinema. As an actor/comedian, he played humorous characters, but mostly he sang. His movies included La Paloma (1934) and Gasparone (1937). Slezak's final film role was as a portly sultan in the 1943 UFA prestige production Münchhausen. His son, Walter Slezak, who started off in musical theater, became a successful character actor in Hollywood during the 1940s. His granddaughter (Walter's daughter) is the actress Erika Slezak, noted for her role on the soap opera One Life to Live.

== Selected filmography ==
- Scandal on Park Street (1932)
- The Ladies Diplomat (1932)
- A Mad Idea (1932)
- Modern Dowry (1932)
- The Gentleman from Maxim's (1933)
- Grand Duchess Alexandra (1933)
- Our Emperor (1933)
- Enjoy Yourselves (1934)
- Music in the Blood (1934)
- Tales from the Vienna Woods (1934)
- The Gentleman Without a Residence (1934)
- Dance Music (1935)
- Circus Saran (1935)
- Immortal Melodies (1935)
- A Night on the Danube (1935)
- The Blonde Carmen (1935)
- The World's in Love (1935)
- The Merry Wives (1936)
- Confetti (1936)
- The Postman from Longjumeau (1936)
- Rendezvous in Vienna (1936)
- The Four Companions (1938)
- The Man Who Couldn't Say No (1938)
- The Life and Loves of Tschaikovsky (1939)
- Woman at the Wheel (1939)
- Roses in Tyrol (1940)
- Operetta (1940)
- Everything for Gloria (1941)
- Beloved Darling (1943)

== Sources ==
- Warrack, John & West, Ewan (1992) The Oxford Dictionary of Opera. Oxford: Oxford University Press; ISBN 0-19-869164-5
