= A Student's Song of Heidelberg =

1930 film

- Austrian release poster
- Directed by: Karl Hartl
- Written by: Billy Wilder; Hans Wilhelm; Ernst Neubach
- Produced by: Günther Stapenhorst
- Starring: Hans Brausewetter; Betty Bird; Willi Forst; Ernst Stahl-Nachbaur
- Cinematography: Carl Hoffmann
- Edited by: Karl Hartl
- Music by: Hans May
- Production company: UFA
- Distributed by: UFA
- Release date: 28 August 1930
- Running time: 78 minutes
- Country: Germany
- Language: German

A Student's Song of Heidelberg (German: Ein Burschenlied aus Heidelberg) is a 1930 German musical film directed by Karl Hartl and starring Hans Brausewetter, Betty Bird and Willi Forst. It marked Hartl's directoral debut. The film is in the tradition of the nostalgic Old Heidelberg.

It was shot at the Babelsberg Studios in Berlin. The film's sets were designed by the art director Robert Herlth.

== Cast ==
- Hans Brausewetter as Bornemann jun
- Betty Bird as Elinor Miller
- Willi Forst as Robert Dahlberg
- Ernst Stahl-Nachbaur as John Miller
- Albert Paulig as Bornemann sen.
- Carl Balhaus as Bornemanns Leibfuchs
- Erwin Kalser as Dr. Zinker
- Ida Wüst as Wirtin
- Hermann Blaß as Sam Mayer
- Paul Biensfeldt as Klubdiener
- Ernst Behmer
- Rudolf Biebrach
- Julius E. Herrmann
- Erich Kestin
- Robert Klein-Lörk
- Philipp Manning
- Erik Ode
- Karl Platen
- Klaus Pohl
- Ludwig Stössel
- Bruno Ziener
- Josef Bunzl
- Peter Hoenselaers as Singer
- Wolfgang Kuhle
- Perponchez
- Schneider
- Wolfgang von Waltershausen
- Max Zilzer

== Bibliography ==
- Bock, Hans-Michael & Bergfelder, Tim. The Concise CineGraph. Encyclopedia of German Cinema. Berghahn Books, 2009.
