= Hans Hermann Schaufuß =

German actor (1893–1982)

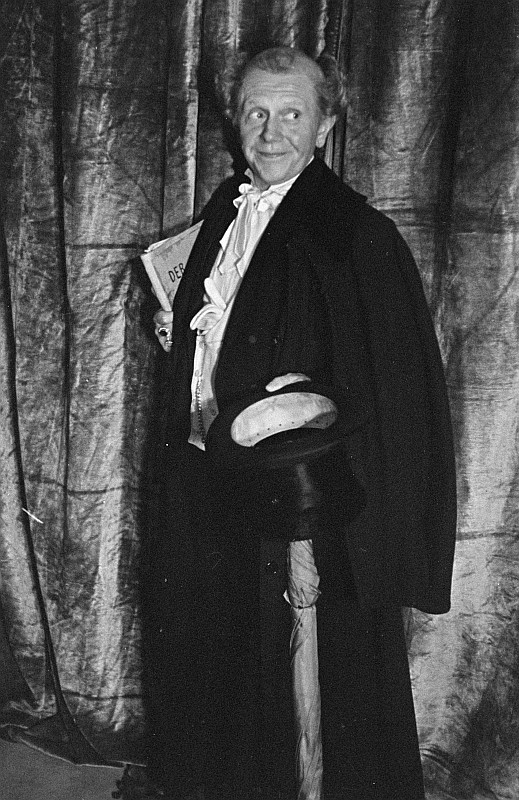
- Born: 13 July 1893; Leipzig, Kingdom of Saxony, German Empire
- Died: 30 January 1982 (aged 88); Munich, West Germany
- Occupation: Actor
- Years active: 1922–1969

Hans Hermann Schaufuß (13 July 1893 – 30 January 1982) was a German actor. He appeared in more than one hundred films from 1922 to 1969. His sons were the actors Hans Joachim Schaufuß and Peter-Timm Schaufuß.

== Selected filmography ==
Year	Title	Role	Notes
1975	The Garbage Dump	Onkel Pink	TV film
1957	A Piece of Heaven	LKW-Fahrer	
1956	Kitty and the Great Big World	Armand	
1955	The Forest House in Tyrol	Kipling	
1953	The Immortal Vagabond		
1953	His Royal Highness		
1951	Hanna Amon	Bürgermeister	
1945	Kolberg	Zaufke	
1944	The Buchholz Family		
1943	Bravo Acrobat!		
1942	My Wife Theresa		
1942	Rembrandt		
1942	The Great King		
1941	The Swedish Nightingale		
1941	Comrades		
1941	Ohm Krüger		
1941	Mistress Moon		
1937	An Enemy of the People		
1936	Boccaccio		
1936	The Court Concert		
1935	Mazurka		
1935	I Love All the Women		
1935	Lessons in Love		
1934	The Eternal Dream		
1934	A Woman with Power of Attorney		
1934	Master of the World		
1934	A Girl Whirls By the World		
1934	Bashful Felix		
1934	Miss Madame		
1933	No Day Without You		
1933	Refugees		
1933	Two Good Comrades		
1932	Peter Voss, Thief of Millions		
1932	No Money Needed		
1932	You Don't Forget Such a Girl		
1932	Spoiling the Game		
1931	Die Bräutigamswitwe		
1931	The Adventurer of Tunis		
1931	The Scoundrel		
1931	The Trunks of Mr. O.F.		
1931	Weekend in Paradise		
1930	Three Days Confined to Barracks		
1930	Die zärtlichen Verwandten		
1929	Paganini in Venice		
1925	Struggle for the Soil		
1925	The Venus of Montmartre		
1924	The Grand Duke's Finances		
