= Die Bräutigamswitwe =

1931 film directed by Richard Eichberg

- Directed by: Richard Eichberg
- Written by: Bobby E. Lüthge; Walter C. Mycroft; Károly Nóti
- Based on: Unwelcome Wife (play) by: Edward A. Paulton; Fred Thompson
- Produced by: Richard Eichberg
- Starring: Mártha Eggerth; Georg Alexander; Fritz Kampers
- Cinematography: Heinrich Gärtner; Bruno Mondi
- Music by: Hans May
- Release date: 17 April 1931 (Germany)
- Running time: 100 min.
- Countries: Germany; United Kingdom
- Language: German

Die Bräutigamswitwe (transl. The Bridegroom's Widow) is a 1931 German comedy film directed by Richard Eichberg. It starred Mártha Eggerth, Georg Alexander, and Fritz Kampers. It is the German-language version of the British film Let's Love and Laugh which was made simultaneously. It was based upon the play Unwelcome Wife written by Edward A. Paulton and Fred Thompson.

== Synopsis ==
Two philanderers marry each other.

== Cast ==
- Mártha Eggerth as Fay Miller, Tanzgirl, Bills Braut
- Georg Alexander as George Brown, ein reicher Junggeselle
- Fritz Kampers as Bill Huber, genannt "Athleten-Bill"
- Hans Hermann Schaufuss as Fays Vater
- Senta Söneland as Fays Mutter
- Albert Paulig as Thomas, George Browns Kammerdiener
- Emil Guttmann as Lawyer Huntington
- Gertrude Kohlmann as Maud, Huntingtons Tochter
- Egon Brosig as Hicks, Detektiv
