= Once There Was a Waltz =

1932 film

- Directed by: Victor Janson
- Written by: Billy Wilder
- Produced by: Gabriel Levy
- Starring: Mártha Eggerth; Rolf von Goth; Paul Hörbiger; Ernő Verebes
- Cinematography: Heinrich Gärtner; Hugo von Kaweczynski
- Edited by: Ladislao Vajda
- Music by: Franz Lehár
- Production company: Aafa-Film
- Distributed by: Aafa-Film
- Release date: 14 April 1932
- Running time: 79 minutes
- Country: Germany
- Language: German

Once There Was a Waltz (German: Es war einmal ein Walzer) is a 1932 German operetta film directed by Victor Janson and starring Mártha Eggerth, Rolf von Goth and Paul Hörbiger. It was shot at the Tempelhof Studios in Berlin with sets designed by the art director Jacek Rotmil. It premiered in Berlin on 14 April 1932. The film was remade in Britain as Where Is This Lady?, released the same year.

== Cast ==
- Mártha Eggerth as Steffi Pirzinger
- Rolf von Goth as Rudi Moebius
- Paul Hörbiger as Franz Pirzinger
- Ernő Verebes as Gustl Linzer
- Albert Paulig as Assessor Pfennig
- Lizzi Natzler as Lucie Weidling
- Ida Wüst as Frau Generalkonsul Weidling
- Fritz Greiner as Fiakerkutscher
- Ernst Pröckl as Ein Kellner
- Paul Wrede as Silhouettenschneider
- Lina Woiwode as Frau Zacherl
- Hermann Blaß as Notar Sauerwein
- Marcel Wittrisch as Singer
- Ernst Wurmser
- Trude Rosen
- Kitty Meinhardt
- Gerta Rozan

== Bibliography ==
- Gemünden, Gerd (2008). A Foreign Affair: Billy Wilder's American Films. Berghahn Books. ISBN 978-1-84545-418-0.
- Grange, William (2008). Cultural Chronicle of the Weimar Republic. Scarecrow Press. ISBN 978-0-8108-5967-8.
