= A Shot at Dawn =

1932 German crime film

- Directed by: Alfred Zeisler
- Written by: Rudolph Cartier; Egon Eis; Otto Eis
- Based on: The Woman and the Emerald by Harry Jenkins
- Produced by: Erich Pommer
- Starring: Ery Bos; Genia Nikolaieva; Karl Ludwig Diehl; Theodor Loos
- Cinematography: Werner Bohne; Konstantin Irmen-Tschet
- Edited by: Erno Hajos
- Music by: Bronislau Kaper
- Production company: UFA
- Distributed by: UFA
- Release date: 18 June 1932
- Running time: 73 minutes
- Country: Germany
- Language: German

A Shot at Dawn (German: Schuß im Morgengrauen) is a 1932 German crime film directed by Alfred Zeisler and starring Ery Bos, Genia Nikolaieva and Karl Ludwig Diehl. It was based on the play The Woman and the Emerald by Harry Jenkins and recounts a jewel theft. It was shot at the Babelsberg Studios in Potsdam with sets designed by the art directors Willi Herrmann and Herbert O. Phillips. A separate French-language version Coup de feu à l'aube was also produced.

== Cast ==
- Ery Bos as Irene Taft
- Genia Nikolajewa as Lola
- Karl Ludwig Diehl as Petersen
- Theodor Loos as Bachmann
- Fritz Odemar as Dr. Sandegg
- Peter Lorre as Klotz
- Heinz Salfner as Joachim Taft
- Gerhard Tandar as Müller IV
- Kurt Vespermann as Bobby
- Ernst Behmer as Gas Station Attendant
- Curt Lucas as Holzknecht
- Hermann Speelmans as Schmitter

== Bibliography ==
- Bock, Hans-Michael & Bergfelder, Tim. The Concise CineGraph. Encyclopedia of German Cinema. Berghahn Books, 2009.
- Youngkin, Stephen. The Lost One: A Life of Peter Lorre. University Press of Kentucky, 2005.
