= Where Is This Lady? =

1932 British film

- Mártha Eggerth and Owen Nares in a scene from the film
- Directed by: Victor Hanbury; Ladislao Vajda
- Written by: Sydney Blow; John Stafford; Billy Wilder (story)
- Produced by: John Stafford
- Starring: Mártha Eggerth; Owen Nares; Wendy Barrie
- Cinematography: Walter Blakeley
- Music by: Franz Lehár; Kurt Schröder
- Production company: Amalgamated Films Associated
- Distributed by: British Lion
- Release date: 1932
- Running time: 77 minutes
- Country: United Kingdom
- Language: English

Where Is This Lady? is a 1932 British musical film directed by Victor Hanbury and Ladislao Vajda and starring Mártha Eggerth, Owen Nares and Wendy Barrie. It was made at Elstree Studios. An operetta film, it is a remake of the German film Once There Was a Waltz (1932) which was adapted from a stage work by Franz Lehár.

== Cast ==
- Mártha Eggerth as Steffi Piringer
- Owen Nares as Rudi Muller
- Wendy Barrie as Lucie Kleiner
- George K. Arthur as Gustl Linzer
- Gibb McLaughlin as Dr. Schilling
- Ellis Jeffreys as Frau Kleiner
- Robert Hale as Herr Piringer
- O. B. Clarence as Dr. Peffer

== Bibliography ==
- Low, Rachael. Filmmaking in 1930s Britain. George Allen & Unwin, 1985.
- Wood, Linda. British Films, 1927-1939. British Film Institute, 1986.
