= The Blue of Heaven =

1932 film

- Directed by: Victor Janson
- Written by: Max Kolpé; Billy Wilder
- Produced by: Gabriel Levy
- Starring: Mártha Eggerth; Hermann Thimig; Fritz Kampers
- Cinematography: Heinrich Gärtner
- Edited by: Else Baum
- Music by: Paul Abraham
- Production company: Aafa-Film
- Distributed by: Aafa-Film
- Release date: 20 December 1932
- Running time: 77 minutes
- Country: Germany
- Language: German

The Blue of Heaven (German: Das Blaue vom Himmel) is a 1932 German musical film directed by Victor Janson and starring Mártha Eggerth, Hermann Thimig, and Fritz Kampers. It was shot at the Tempelhof Studios in Berlin. The film's sets were designed by the art director Jacek Rotmil. It is set partly on the Berlin U-Bahn system.

== Cast ==
- Mártha Eggerth as Anni Müller
- Hermann Thimig as Hans Meier
- Fritz Kampers as Tobias
- Margarete Schlegel as Zigaretten-Cilly
- Ernö Verebes as Der flotte Hugo
- Jakob Tiedtke as U-Papa
- Margarete Kupfer as Frau Breitsprecher
- Hans Richter as Tommy
- Walter Steinbeck as Generaldirektor O.F. Pieper
- Mathilde Sussin as Fräulein Fischer
- Erich Kestin as Piepers Chauffeur
- Ernst Behmer
- Gerhard Dammann as Taxichauffeur
- Otto Sauter-Sarto
- Erwin van Roy
- Hugo Fischer-Köppe

== Bibliography ==
- Moritz, William (2004). Optical Poetry: The Life and Work of Oskar Fischinger. Bloomington: Indiana University Press. ISBN 978-0-253-34348-2.
- Klaus, Ulrich J. Deutsche Tonfilme: Jahrgang 1932. Klaus-Archiv, 1988.
