= The Black Forest Girl =

The Black Forest Girl may refer to:

- Schwarzwaldmädel (Black Forest Girl), a 1917 operetta by German composer Leon Jessel
- Schwarzwaldmädel (1920 film), a silent German film directed by Arthur Wellin
- Schwarzwaldmädel (1929 film), a silent German film directed by Victor Janson
- Schwarzwaldmädel (1933 film), a German film directed by Georg Zoch
- Schwarzwaldmädel (1950 film), a West German film directed by Hans Deppe
