= The Man in the Saddle =

The Man in the Saddle can refer to:

- The Man in the Saddle (1925 film), a German film
- The Man in the Saddle (1926 film), an American film
- The Man in the Saddle (1945 film), a German film
- Man in the Saddle, a 1951 American film
- Man in the Saddle, a 1938 novel by Ernest Haycox
