= Alte Komische Oper Berlin =

German theatre

Coordinates: 52°31′18″N 13°23′18″E

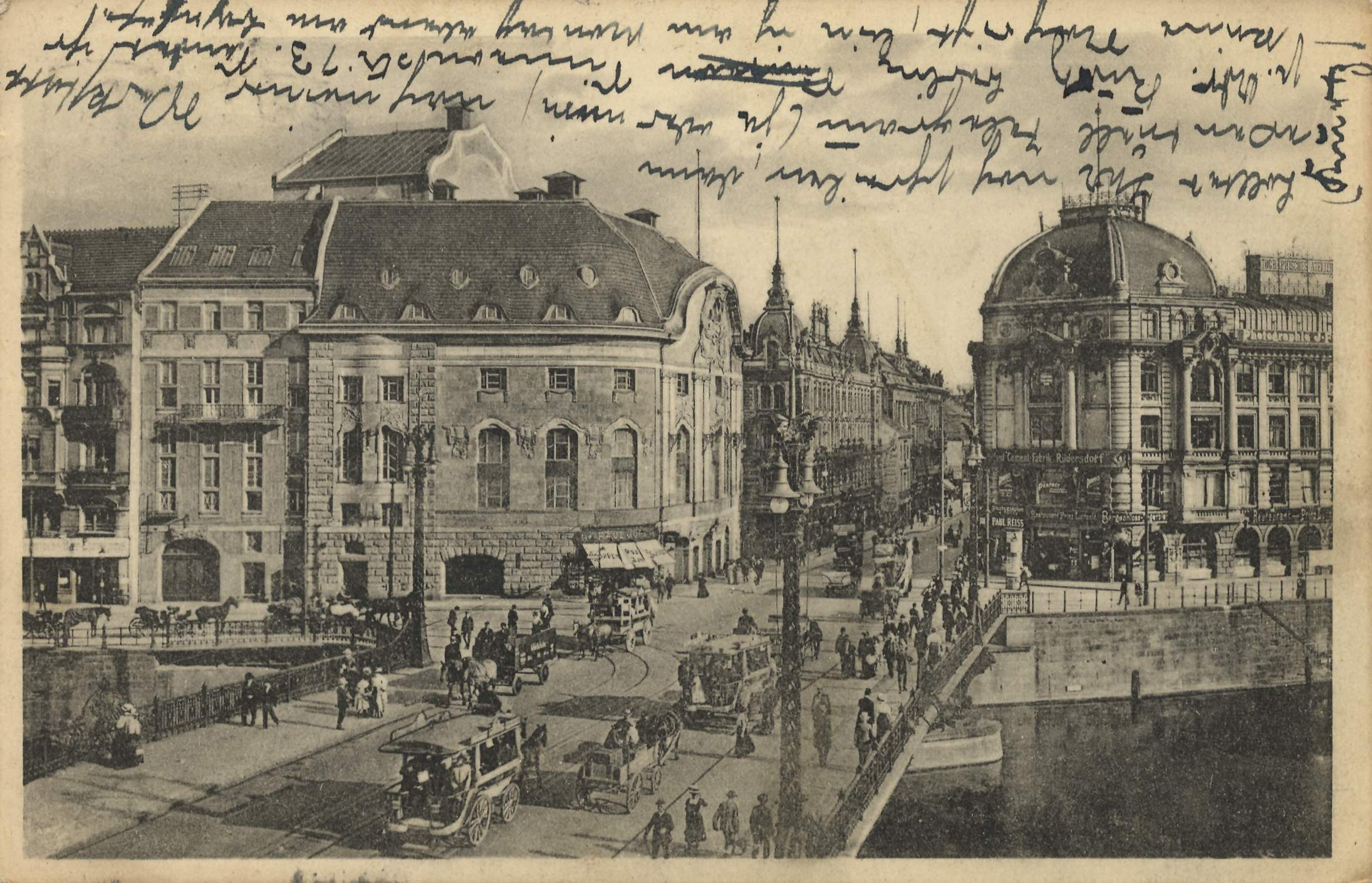
The Komische Oper on a picture postcard sent in 1912

The old Komische Oper was a privately run Opera house in Berlin-Mitte, Friedrichstraße 104, at the Weidendammer Bridge. It is not to be confused with today's Komische Oper Berlin, Behrenstraße 55-57. The naming Komische Oper referred to the Parisian Opéra-Comique.

== History ==
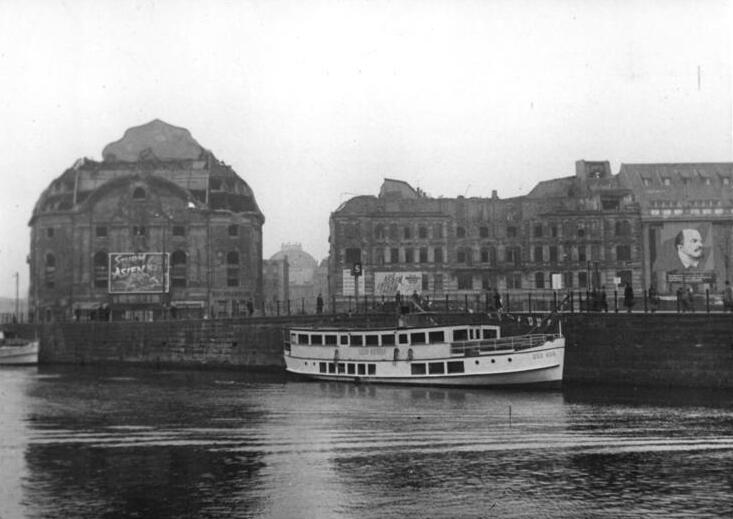
Alte Komische Oper (left building) at the Weidendammer Bridge, 1950

The house was built in about eleven months from December 1904 to November 1905. The Berlin building firm Lachmann & Zauber was commissioned with the planning and construction; the architect Arthur Biberfeld (1874-1959) employed there is named as the designer of the façade design.

In addition to the Friedrichstraße railway station, the surrounding area was also home to the Admiralspalast, one of Berlin's most famous revue theatres in the 1920s, other theatres and various well-known hotels. This central location resulted in a high price for the land even at the time of construction, which in turn made it necessary to erect the building on a relatively small site of 1,370 m², which was actually too cramped for a music theatre. The builder and first artistic director of the theatre (until 1911), Hans Gregor, described the auditorium as "amateurishly botched", which had 1,254 seats in the stalls and on three cantilevered tiers. In front of the 9.20 m wide stage opening, the orchestra pit provided space for up to 60 musicians. The auditorium, galleries and foyer were lavishly decorated, the sculptural ornamentation executed by the Berlin Bildhauerwerkstatt für Stuck- und Antragearbeiten Albert Kretzschmar could be classified stylistically between Neobaroque and Jugendstil. In the external appearance of the theatre, the neo-baroque features came to the fore through the colossal pilasters and the curves (roof, building edges and gable field), while the façades were made of light-coloured Cotta sandstone.

After the departure of the artistic director Hans Gregor, operettas were increasingly performed. The singer Aurelie Révy (1879-1957) took over as director of the Komische Oper. A highlight of this phase was the 1917 premiere of Schwarzwaldmädel. In the 1920s, the focus shifted - following the general taste of the time - towards revues. At the beginning of the 1920s, the house became the property of the Internationale Neuheiten-Vertriebs-Gesellschaft.

In 1929, the Berlin architect Martin Punitzer undertook a design modernisation reflecting the changing musical tastes, in which the plastic decorations inside the building, which were by then perceived as overloaded and old-fashioned, were removed. Opaque glass light boxes were installed on the façade above the entrance, following the contemporary trend towards electronic signage, which attracts attention especially in the evening hours. At the same time, however, the company ran into financial difficulties and put the building up for sale at auction.

In the mid-1930s, Kurt Strickrodt ran the house.

The building was heavily damaged during the Second World War but remained in use until the early 1950s. It was demolished in 1952. In its place, the Haus der Tschechoslowakischen Kultur ("House of Czechoslovak Culture") and the Haus der Polnischen Kultur ("House of Polish Culture") were built, which opened in 1955 and 1956, respectively. Both institutions moved to new locations in the 1970s and the buildings remained vacant until they were torn down in the late 1990s. A hotel was built at the site and opened in 2006.

== Premieres in the Komischen Oper ==
- 21 February 1907: A Village Romeo and Juliet (opera by Frederick Delius)
- 25 August 1917: Schwarzwaldmädel (Operetta, Libretto by August Neidhart, Music by Leon Jessel)
- 1934: Die Frau im Spiegel (music by Will Meisel)
- 1935: Heirat nicht ausgeschlossen (Lustspiel mit Musik, libretto by Richard Keßler, music by Walter Kollo)
- 24 January 1937: Juliane Kay: Der Schneider treibt den Teufel aus – director: Friedrich Hellmund
- Jeden Tag kann Hochzeit sein

== Singer and actor at the Komische Oper ==
Hanns Bosenius, Paul Heidemann, Martin Hellberg, Erik Ode, Ewald Wenck, Blandine Ebinger, Hilde Gebühr, Ida Perry, Fee von Reichlin, Grethe Weiser
