= Soubrette =

Mischievous and coquettish female character in theatre and opera

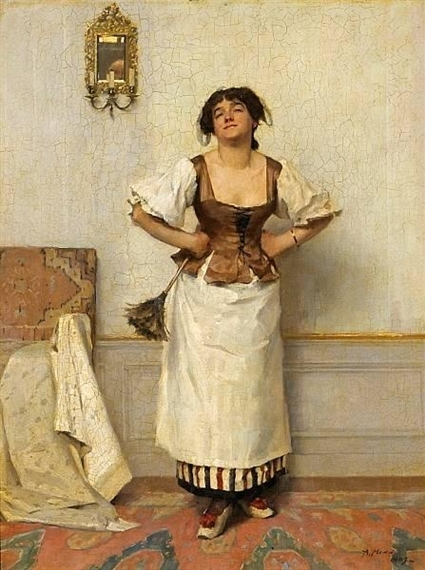
Soubrette by Alexander Mann

A soubrette is a female minor stock character in opera and theatre, often a pert lady's maid. By extension, the term can refer generally to any saucy or flirtatious young woman. The term arrived in English from Provençal via French, and means "conceited" or "coy".

== Theatre ==
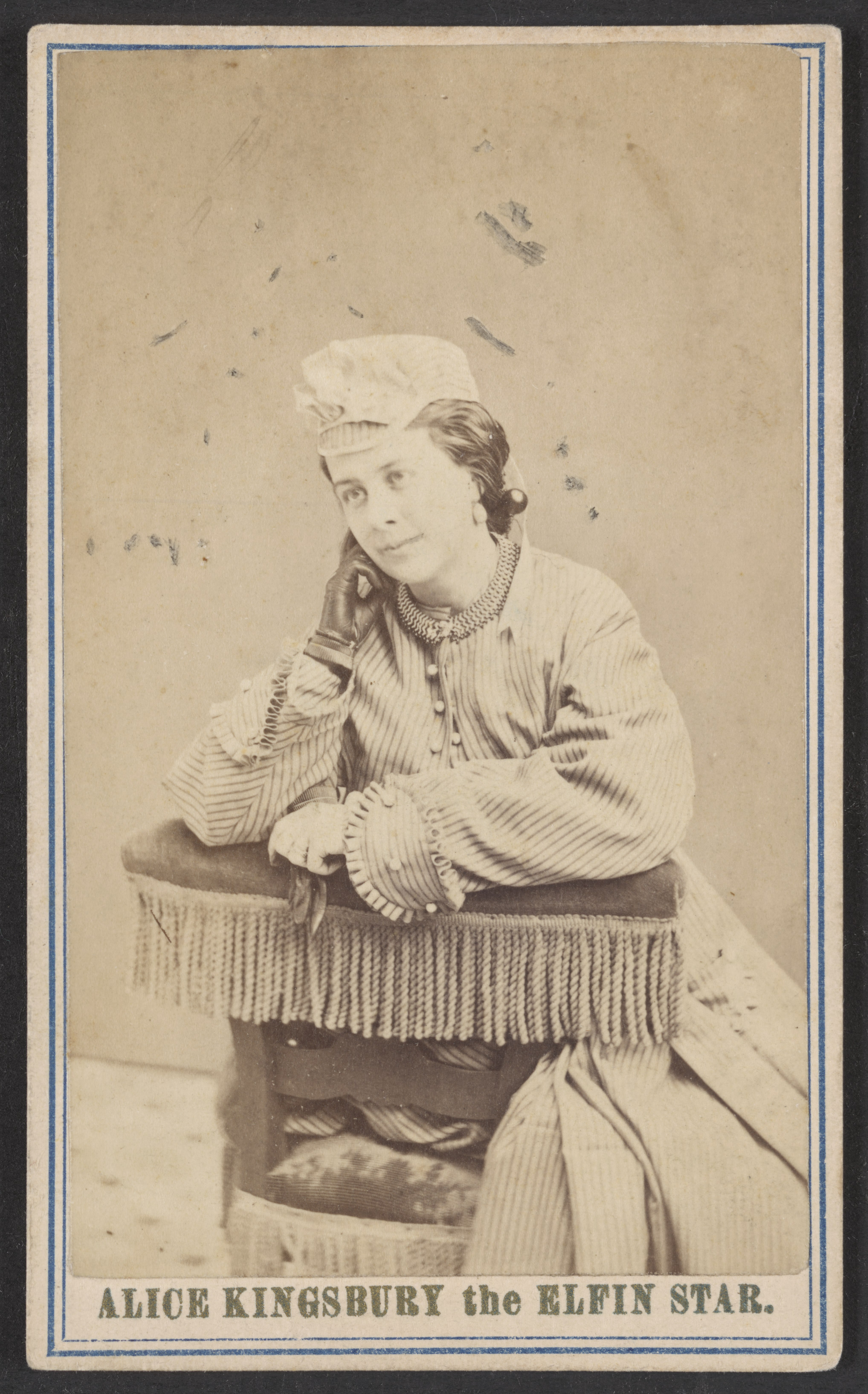
The soubrette Alice Kingsbury, by J. W. Winder & Co.

In theatre, a soubrette is a comedy character who is vain and girlish, mischievous, lighthearted, coquettish and gossipy—often a chambermaid or confidante of the ingénue. She often displays a flirtatious or even sexually aggressive nature. The soubrette appeared in commedia dell'arte scenarios, often in the role of Columbina, where the actress would provide the details of her behaviour and dialogue. From there, she moved to the works of Molière, which were influenced by the Commedia; the role of Dorine in Tartuffe (1664) fits the description. A famous example, though a hundred years later, is Suzanne in Beaumarchais' Le Mariage de Figaro (1784).

== Opera ==
In classical music and opera, the term soubrette refers to both a soprano voice type or fach and a type of opera role. A soubrette voice is light with a bright, sweet timbre, a tessitura in the mid-range, but lacking extensive coloratura. A soubrette's vocal range extends approximately from middle C (C_{4}) to "high D" (D_{6}). The voice has a lighter vocal weight than other soprano voices with a brighter timbre. The tessitura of the soubrette tends to lie a bit lower than the lyric soprano and spinto soprano.

Many young singers start out as soubrettes, but as they grow older and their voice matures they may be reclassified as another voice type, usually either a light lyric soprano, a lyric coloratura soprano, or a coloratura mezzo-soprano. Rarely does a singer remain a soubrette throughout her entire career.

Soubrette roles are typically found in comic operas or operettas, and they usually portray good-looking, youthful girls who are flirtatious, saucy, and street-wise. Typically these roles are sung by younger singers and both sopranos and mezzo-sopranos are cast in them.

Many soubrette roles have a considerable amount of spoken German dialogue, and therefore the soubrette singer must possess both an excellent comprehension of the German language and considerable acting skills. It is rare to find true soubrettes singing in major opera houses, as their voices are typically unable to carry over larger orchestras in larger halls. Often lyric, coloratura, and mezzo-sopranos are cast in soubrette roles, especially in the early part of their singing careers. This does not mean that these singers are soubrette sopranos but it does mean they can play soubrette roles.

The coloratura soprano has a higher range, can sing more dexterous vocal passages and has a somewhat brighter sound than the soubrette. The lyric soprano has a richer voice and higher range than the soubrette soprano. The mezzo-soprano can sing as high as a soubrette but with a darker timbre and heavier weight in the voice. Mezzos also have a much more extensive range in the lower register. In addition, the light voice of the soubrette is ideal for baroque music, early music, and baroque opera, as well as many art songs. However, the soubrette soprano voice is limited even in this repertoire by its lack of coloratura skill and relatively limited range.

Many operettas and musicals include soubrette characters, such as Valencienne in The Merry Widow, and in Gilbert and Sullivan the Jessie Bond mezzo-soprano roles such as Pitti-Sing (The Mikado). Another example is the character Ellie Mae Chipley, who sings "Life Upon the Wicked Stage" in Kern and Hammerstein's Show Boat.

== Roles in opera and operettas ==
- Adele, Die Fledermaus (J. Strauss II)
- Alison, The Wandering Scholar (Holst)
- Amor, Orfeo ed Euridice (Gluck)
- Ännchen, Der Freischütz (von Weber)
- Ann Page, The Merry Wives of Windsor (Nicolai)
- Auretta, L'oca del Cairo (Mozart)
- Barbarina, The Marriage of Figaro (Mozart)
- Bärbele, Schwarzwaldmädel (Jessel)
- Bastienne, Bastien und Bastienne (Mozart)
- Belinda, Dido and Aeneas (Purcell)
- Berta, Il barbiere di Siviglia (Gioachino Rossini)
- Cis, Albert Herring (Britten)
- Clotilde, Norma (Bellini)
- Despina, Così fan tutte (Mozart)
- Echo, Ariadne auf Naxos (R. Strauss)
- Elisa, Il re pastore (Mozart)
- Emmie, Albert Herring (Britten)
- Giannetta, L'elisir d'amore (Donizetti)
- Hannele, Schwarzwaldmädel (Jessel)
- Hirte (Shepherd), Tannhäuser (Wagner)
- Lisa, Gräfin Mariza (Kálmán)
- Lisa, The Grand Duke (Gilbert and Sullivan)
- Lisette, La rondine (Puccini)
- Marie, Der Waffenschmied (Lortzing)
- Marie, Zar und Zimmermann (Lortzing)
- Marzellina, Fidelio (Beethoven)
- Musetta, La bohème (Puccini)
- Nannetta, Falstaff (Verdi)
- Norina, Don Pasquale (Donizetti)
- Ninetta, La finta semplice (Mozart)
- Olga, Fedora (Giordano)
- Papagena, The Magic Flute (Mozart)
- Phoebe, The Yeomen of the Guard (Gilbert and Sullivan)
- Pitti-Sing, The Mikado (Gilbert and Sullivan)
- Servilia, La clemenza di Tito (Mozart)
- Serpetta, La finta giardiniera (Mozart)
- Serpina, La serva padrona (Pergolesi)
- Sophie, Der Rosenkavalier (R. Strauss)
- Stasi, Die Csárdásfürstin (Kálmán)
- Susanna, The Marriage of Figaro (Mozart)
- Yniold, Pelléas et Mélisande (Debussy)
- Zerlina, Don Giovanni (Mozart)
