= Schwarzwaldmädel (1920 film) =

1920 film

- Directed by: Arthur Wellin
- Written by: Robert Heymann
- Based on: Schwarzwaldmädel by August Neidhart
- Starring: Uschi Elleot; Gustav Charle; Carl Neisser
- Cinematography: Ernest Plhak
- Production company: Luna-Film
- Release date: 22 July 1920
- Running time: 84 minutes
- Country: Germany
- Languages: Silent; German intertitles

Schwarzwaldmädel (Black Forest Girl) is a 1920 German silent drama film directed by Arthur Wellin and starring Uschi Elleot, Gustav Charle and Carl Neisser. The film is based on the 1917 operetta of the same title, composed by Leon Jessel with a libretto by August Neidhart. It is one of a number of adaptations that have been made.

== Cast ==
- Uschi Elleot as Bärbele
- Gustav Charle as Domkapellmeister
- Carl Neisser as Schmußheim
- Edward Eyseneck as Hans
- Oskar Linke
- Emil Stammer
- Ria Jende

== Bibliography ==
- Ashkenazi, Ofer. Anti-Heimat Cinema: The Jewish Invention of the German Landscape. University of Michigan Press, 2020.
- Ludewig, Alexandra. Screening Nostalgia: 100 Years of German Heimat Film. transcript Verlag, 2014.
