= Schwarzwaldmädel (1950 film) =

1950 West German film

- Directed by: Hans Deppe
- Written by: Bobby E. Lüthge
- Based on: Schwarzwaldmädel by August Neidhart
- Produced by: Kurt Ulrich
- Starring: Paul Hörbiger; Sonja Ziemann; Rudolf Prack
- Cinematography: Kurt Schulz
- Edited by: Margarete Steinborn
- Music by: Frank Fox; Leon Jessel
- Production company: Berolina Film
- Distributed by: Herzog Film
- Release date: 7 September 1950
- Running time: 100 minutes
- Country: West Germany
- Language: German
- Box office: 5.6 million DM

Schwarzwaldmädel (Black Forest Girl) is a 1950 West German drama film directed by Hans Deppe and starring Paul Hörbiger, Sonja Ziemann, and Rudolf Prack. It is based on the 1917 operetta of the same title by Leon Jessel and August Neidhart. The film was a huge commercial success, both the biggest hit that year and the most popular film since the war. Within two years fourteen million tickets were sold in West Germany, and on the strength of it Sonja Ziemann and Rudolf Prack topped the popularity charts and received Bambi awards.

The film's success revived the popularity of Heimatfilm, which came to dominate the German box office over the coming decade.

Incidentally, this production holds fame as being the world's first film to have been projected by the light of the then new Xenon short arc lamps. This set the standard for things to come, and decades later these impressive light sources continue to dominate cinematic projections around the world.

== Production ==
Schwarzwaldmädel was made at the Tempelhof Studios in Berlin while location shooting took place in the Black Forest. The film's sets were designed by the art director Gabriel Pellon. Shot in Agfacolor, it was the first colour film to be shot in western Germany since the Second World War. An East German production Heart of Stone was also made in colour the same year.

== Cast ==
- Paul Hörbiger as cathedral Kapellmeister
- Sonja Ziemann as Bärbele Riederle
- Rudolf Prack as Hans Hauser, a painter
- Gretl Schörg as Malwine Heinau, a revue star
- Walter Müller as Richard Petersen
- Lucie Englisch as Lorle
- Fritz Kampers as Jürgen, innkeeper of "Blauer Ochse"
- Ernst Waldow as Fritz Bussmann, a jeweller
- Hans Richter as Theo Patzke
- Kurt Seifert as man in the street
- Kurt Zehe as Gottlieb, a farmhand
- Trude Wilke-Roßwog as Traudel Riederle
- Kurt Pratsch-Kaufmann as Staubig, an accountant
- Franz-Otto Krüger as conférencier
- Karl Schöpp as cathedral provost
- Lewis Brody as a party guest (uncredited)
