= Schwarzwaldmädel (1929 film) =

1929 film

- Directed by: Victor Janson
- Written by: Max Jungk; Walter Reisch
- Produced by: Gustav Schwab
- Starring: Liane Haid; Fred Louis Lerch; Walter Janssen; Georg Alexander
- Cinematography: Eduard Hoesch; Edgar S. Ziesemer
- Production company: Merkur-Film
- Distributed by: Deutsche First National Pictures
- Release date: 24 October 1929
- Country: Germany
- Languages: Silent; German intertitles

Schwarzwaldmädel (Black Forest Girl) is a 1929 German silent romance film directed by Victor Janson and starring Liane Haid, Fred Louis Lerch and Walter Janssen.

It was distributed by the German branch of the American company First National Pictures. The film's art direction was by Heinz Fenchel and Jacek Rotmil. The film is based on the 1917 operetta of the same title, composed by Leon Jessel with a libretto by August Neidhart. It is set in the Black Forest region of Germany in the 1840s.

== Cast ==
- Liane Haid as Hanni
- Fred Louis Lerch as Paul Lubin
- Walter Janssen as Domkapellmeister Römer
- Georg Alexander as Flips
- Olga Limburg as Freifrau von Steintal
- Mildred Wayne as Nina Field
- Valy Arnheim as Severin
- Hans Sternberg as Bürgermeister
- Hella Thornegg

== Bibliography ==
- Prawer, Siegbert Salomon (2005). Between Two Worlds: The Jewish Presence in German and Austrian Film, 1910–1933. New York: Berghahn Books. ISBN 978-1-84545-074-8.
