= Anonymous Letters =

1949 film

- Directed by: Arthur Maria Rabenalt
- Written by: Annemarie Artinger (novel); Ernst Hasselbach
- Produced by: Frank Clifford
- Starring: Käthe Haack; Tilly Lauenstein; O.E. Hasse
- Cinematography: Otto Baecker
- Edited by: Walter Wischniewsky
- Music by: Theo Mackeben
- Production company: Cordial-Film
- Distributed by: Europa-Filmverleih
- Release date: 29 March 1949
- Running time: 95 minutes
- Country: Germany
- Language: German

Anonymous Letters (German: Anonyme Briefe) is a 1949 German drama film directed by Arthur Maria Rabenalt, and starring Käthe Haack, Tilly Lauenstein, and O.E. Hasse. It was shot at the Tempelhof Studios in West Berlin and on location in the city at the time of the Berlin Blockade. The film's sets were designed by the art director Willi Herrmann.

== Synopsis ==
In Occupied Berlin the students at a drama school begin receiving anonymous letters threatening to reveal secrets about them. Considerable mistrusts grows amongst the students, culminating in one of them attempting suicide. Eventually the head of the school calls in the police to investigate.

== Cast ==
- Käthe Haack as Toni Gerling
- Tilly Lauenstein as Anita Grauberg
- O.E. Hasse as Alexander Petershagen
- Petra Peters as Ulli Brackmann
- Jeanette Schultze as Monika
- Cornell Borchers as Cornelia
- Addi Adametz as Hanna
- Ann Höling as Ilona
- Eva Rimski as Mariela
- Ute Sielisch as Elfie
- Babsi Schultz-Reckewell as Gesche
- Marianne Prenzel as Rose
- Annemarie Book as Rosanne
- Vlachy König as Lore
- Georg August Koch as Heinrich Brackmann
- Rainer Penkert as Axel Brackmann
- Alfred Braun as Dr. Maurin
- Otto Gebühr as Karl Bundschuh - Postbote
- Helmut Heyne as Dr. Armbruster
- Viktor de Kowa
- Michiko Tanaka
- Willi Schaeffers
- Rudolf Günther Wagner
- Kurt Seifert as Gregor Mauermann - Bauunternehmer
- Christel Henning as Karin, seine Tochter
- Joachim Wedekind as Hans Brackmann
- Theo Mackeben
- Erna Sellmer
- Elsa Wagner

== Bibliography ==
- Bock, Hans-Michael; Bergfelder, Tim, eds. (2009). The Concise Cinegraph: Encyclopaedia of German Cinema. New York: Berghahn Books. ISBN 978-1-57181-655-9.
