= Stips =

1951 film directed by Carl Froelich

- Directed by: Carl Froelich
- Written by: Hanns H. Fischer; Carl Froelich
- Starring: Gustav Fröhlich; Heli Finkenzeller; Eva Ingeborg Scholz
- Cinematography: Bruno Stephan
- Edited by: Walter von Bonhorst
- Music by: Herbert Windt
- Production companies: Carl Froelich-Film; Cinephon-Film
- Distributed by: Fortuna-Filmverleih
- Release date: 4 September 1951
- Running time: 99 minutes
- Country: West Germany
- Language: German

Stips is a 1951 West German romantic comedy film directed by Carl Froelich and starring Gustav Fröhlich, Heli Finkenzeller and Eva Ingeborg Scholz. It was shot at the Tempelhof Studios in West Berlin. The film's sets were designed by the art director Hans Luigi.

== Synopsis ==
Doctor Dirkhoff, nicknamed Stips, was a popular but unconventional art teacher at a local school. Many of the girls in his classes had romantic crushes on him. When he returns to the town nearly a decade later, now a widower, most of his former students are now happily married but his return reawakens their feelings for him.

== Cast ==
- Gustav Fröhlich as Dr. Klaus Michael Dirkhoff, genannt Stips
- Heli Finkenzeller as Katja Romberg
- Eva Ingeborg Scholz as Regine Wülfing
- Hans Richter as Albert Pollmann, Friseuer
- Ruth Nimbach as Elli P., geb. Pieper
- Otto Gebühr as Stülpe, Burgkastellan
- Aribert Wäscher as Wilhelm Tobias, Schuldirektor
- Bruno Fritz as Felix Sommer, Verleger
- Ann Höling as Jutta S.
- Renate Barken
- Dagmar Biener
- Christa Fügner
- Sigrid Lagemann
- Eva Probst
- Violet Rensing

== Bibliography ==
- Bock, Hans-Michael & Bergfelder, Tim. The Concise Cinegraph: Encyclopaedia of German Cinema. Berghahn Books, 2009.
