= The Marathon Runner =

1933 film directed by Ewald André Dupont

- Directed by: Ewald André Dupont
- Written by: Werner Scheff (novel); Thea von Harbou
- Produced by: Marcel Hellman; Frank Clifford
- Starring: Brigitte Helm; Hans Brausewetter; Ursula Grabley; Viktor de Kowa
- Cinematography: Eugen Schüfftan
- Edited by: Herbert Selpin
- Music by: Giuseppe Becce
- Production company: Matador-Film
- Distributed by: Siegel-Monopolfilm
- Release date: 24 February 1933
- Running time: 98 minutes
- Country: Germany
- Language: German

The Marathon Runner (German: Der Läufer von Marathon) is a 1933 German sports film directed by Ewald André Dupont and starring Brigitte Helm, Hans Brausewetter and Ursula Grabley. It was based on a 1928 novel by Werner Scheff, adapted by screenwriter Thea von Harbou. The film focuses on a love triangle between three German athletes competing at the 1932 Olympic Games in Los Angeles. It was shot at the Johannisthal Studios in Berlin with sets designed by the art directors Ernő Metzner and Erich Zander. The German premiere took place at the Ufa-Palast am Zoo. It was the last film Dupont made in Germany, before escaping into exile following the rise to power of the Nazis.

== Cast ==
- Brigitte Helm as Lore Steinkopf
- Hans Brausewetter as Karl Roesicke
- Ursula Grabley as Else Wittig, Lores Freundin
- Viktor de Kowa as Georg Cornelius
- Paul Hartmann as José Barrada
- Trude von Molo as Evelyne Barrada
- Oscar Sabo as Werner Franck, Trainer
- Carl Balhaus as Hans Huber
- Nien Soen Ling as Tschou Ling
- Alfred Durra as Ein Reporter

== Bibliography ==
- Bergfelder, Tim; Cargnelli, Christian, eds. (2008). Destination London: German-Speaking Emigrés and British Cinema, 1925–1950. Berghahn Books. ISBN 978-0-85745-019-7.
