= Eva Ingeborg Scholz =

German actress (1928–2022)

- Born: 16 February 1928; Berlin, Brandenburg, Prussia, Germany
- Died: 21 March 2022 (aged 94); Graefelfing, Munich, Germany
- Occupation: Actress
- Years active: 1947–2022
- Spouse(s): Wilfried Seyferth (1953–1954) (his death); George Hurdalek (? - ?) (divorced)
- Children: 2

Eva Ingeborg Scholz (16 February 1928 – 21 March 2022) was a German film and television actress.

== Biography ==
Eva Ingeborg Scholz made her debut in the title role of the 1948 film 1-2-3 Corona and appeared regularly in films over the following decade, including a performance as a young lodger in Peter Lorre's only directorial effort The Lost One (1951) and a supporting role in The Devil's General (1955) with Curd Jürgens. Among her later films are the Disney production Emil and the Detectives (1964), in which she played the mother of the title character, and Rainer Werner Fassbinder's The American Soldier (1970).

From the early 1960s she appeared increasingly in television, where she remained active until the age of 90 years in 2018. She appeared in popular television productions like Tatort, Derrick, The Old Fox and Stuttgart Homicide. In 2018, she won the Deutscher Schauspielpreis (German Actors Award) for her supporting role in the Tatort episode Die Liebe, ein seltsames Spiel (2017).

== Selected filmography ==
- 1-2-3 Corona (1948)
- The Time with You (1948)
- Das Fräulein und der Vagabund (1949)
- Cinderella (1950) - Cinderella (German dub)
- The Lost One (1951)
- Not Without Gisela (1951)
- The Dubarry (1951)
- Stips (1951)
- Alice in Wonderland (1951) - Alice's sister (German dub)
- The Smugglers' Banquet (1952)
- Pension Schöller (1952)
- Der fröhliche Weinberg (1952)
- The Devil's General (1955)
- Ball at the Savoy (1955)
- Bandits of the Autobahn (1955)
- Secrets of the City (1955)
- Operation Sleeping Bag (1955)
- Furlough on Word of Honor (1955)
- Alibi (1955)
- Blitzmädels an die Front (1958)
- The Girl from the Marsh Croft (1958)
- Das große Wunschkonzert (1960)
- The Time Has Come (1960, TV series)
- The Black Abbot (1963)
- Emil and the Detectives (1964)
- A Woman Needs Loving (1969)
- The American Soldier (1970)
- Berlin Tunnel 21 (1981)
- Doctor Faustus (1982)
- The Pharmacist (1997)
- Rossini (1997)
- Welcome to Germany (2016)
