= Big City Secret =

1952 film

- Directed by: Leo de Laforgue
- Written by: Richard Busch; Leo de Laforgue
- Produced by: Karl Schmitz
- Starring: Ingrid Lutz; Fritz Wagner; Joachim Teege
- Cinematography: Herbert Geier
- Edited by: Walter Wischniewsky
- Music by: Herbert Trantow
- Production company: Ideal-Film
- Distributed by: J. Arthur Rank Film
- Release date: 12 April 1952
- Running time: 78 minutes
- Country: West Germany
- Language: German

Big City Secret (German: Großstadtgeheimnis) is a 1952 West German crime film directed by Leo de Laforgue and starring Ingrid Lutz, Fritz Wagner, and Joachim Teege . It was shot entirely on location around Berlin, Hamburg and Dresden, partly using pre-war stock footage. It is inspired partly by the criminal Sass Brothers active in the Weimar era.

== Synopsis ==
Two master criminals break into the vault of a bank at Berlin's Wittenbergplatz and steal a large sum. While they are apprehended soon afterwards, police have no hard evidence and have to release them. However, detectives set out to find and secure the necessary evidence and bring the criminals to justice.

== Cast ==
- Ingrid Lutz as Vera Liemann
- Fritz Wagner as Werner Trantow
- Harald Holberg as Horst Berger
- Joachim Teege as Fritz Möller
- Alfred Schieske as Bogeslav Herzberg
- Ann Höling as Olly Flint
- Paul Wagner as Doctor Westphal
- Karl Meixner as Mann mit Narbe
- Erich Poremski as Herr Van Zeeland
- Willi Rose as Jim
- Karl Meurer
- Hildegard Röder

== Bibliography ==
- Karl, Lars; Skopal, Pavel, eds. (2015). Cinema in Service of the State: Perspectives on Film Culture in the GDR and Czechoslovakia, 1945–1960. New York: Berghahn Books. ISBN 978-1-78238-997-2.
