= Not Without Gisela =

1951 film

- Directed by: Hans Deppe
- Written by: Paul Gordon; Walter F. Fichelscher
- Produced by: Waldemar Frank
- Starring: Peter Mosbacher; Eva Ingeborg Scholz; Hilde Sessak
- Cinematography: Ted Kornowicz; Herbert Körner; Hugo O. Schulze; Arndt von Rautenfeld
- Edited by: Walter Wischniewsky
- Music by: Franz R. Friedl
- Production company: Central-Europa Film
- Distributed by: Prisma-Film
- Release date: 7 September 1951
- Running time: 82 minutes
- Country: West Germany
- Language: German

Not Without Gisela (German: Es geht nicht ohne Gisela) is a 1951 West German musical comedy film directed by Hans Deppe and starring Peter Mosbacher, Eva Ingeborg Scholz and Hilde Sessak. It was shot at the Spandau Studios in West Berlin and on location around the city. The film's sets were designed by the art director Emil Hasler.

== Synopsis ==
A young inventor who believes he can radically improve television faces some difficulties, but is assisted by the young part-time reporter Gisela who does much to refine and promote his project.

== Cast ==
- Peter Mosbacher as Robert Halm
- Horst Gentzen as Sein Freund Pitt
- Eva Ingeborg Scholz as Gisela Düren, eine junge Studentin
- Edith Schneider as Trixi
- Hilde Sessak as Melanie, Tänzerin
- Aribert Wäscher as Mertens, Finanzier
- Paul Heidemann as Hartwig – Regisseur
- Werner Finck as Werner Finck
- Paul Wagner as Direktor Brennert
- Kurt Vespermann as Prokurist Braun
- Ann Höling as Dore – ihre Freundin
- Alexa von Porembsky as Lottchen Zwieback
- Hans Leibelt as Bankier Werner
- Olga Limburg as Seine Mutter
- Rolf Weih as Ricardo
- Otto Braml as Dr. Schreiber – Lawyer
- Werner Schott as Chefredakteur
- Christiane Jansen as Marion
- Liselotte Köster as Sohn & Ballettteil
- Jockel Stahl as Vater & Balletteil
- Das Ballett der Städtischen Oper Berlin as Ballett
- Erwin Bredow as Ballett
- Maria Corelli as Opern-Teil: Sängerin
- Diana Eustrati as Opernteil: Sängerin
- Gerhard Frei as Opernteil: Sänger
- Maria Fris as Ballett
- Paul Schmidtmann as Opernteil: Sänger
- Rudolf Schock as Opernteil: Sänger
- Rita Streich as Opernteil: Sängerin
- Margo Ufer as Ballett
- Hans Wocke as Opernteil: Sänger

== Bibliography ==
- Gerhard Bliersbach. So grün war die Heide: der deutsche Nachkriegsfilm in neuer Sicht. Beltz, 1985.
