= Chemistry and Love =

1948 film directed by Arthur Maria Rabenalt

- German film poster
- German: Chemie und Liebe
- Directed by: Arthur Maria Rabenalt
- Written by: Frank Clifford; Marion Keller
- Starring: Hans Nielsen; Tilly Lauenstein; Ralph Lothar
- Cinematography: Bruno Mondi
- Edited by: Alice Ludwig
- Music by: Theo Mackeben
- Production company: DEFA
- Distributed by: Sovexport
- Release date: 1 June 1948
- Running time: 98 minutes
- Country: East Germany
- Language: German

Chemistry and Love (German: Chemie und Liebe) is a 1948 East German comedy film directed by Arthur Maria Rabenalt and starring Hans Nielsen, Tilly Lauenstein and Ralph Lothar. It is an anti-capitalist satire inspired by a stage play by the communist writer Béla Balázs. The plot is built around the discoveries of a crusading inventor.

It was made by the state-controlled DEFA and shot at the Johannisthal Studios in East Berlin. The film's sets were designed by the art director Emil Hasler.

== Cast ==
- Hans Nielsen as Dr. Alland
- Tilly Lauenstein as Martina Höller
- Ralph Lothar as da Costa
- Ann Höling as Georgia Spaldi
- Gisela Deege as Aimée
- Arno Paulsen as C.D. Miller
- Gerd Frickhöffer
- Arno Ebert as Cprnelius Vandenhoff
- Alfred Braun as Narrator
- Anneliese Rausch as Annelie
- Jakob Tiedtke as Patient
- Ye Chong Yin as Sprechstundenhilfe
- Gustav Püttjer as Charly
- Eugen Klinger as Dr. Nasier
- Eduard Matzig as Dr. Hirai
- Heinz Schröder as Dr. Oricheff
- Wolfgang Adriano as Dr. Jänicker
- Helmut Heyne as Dr. Blohmquist
- Elfie Dugall as Fräulein White
- Walter Weinacht as Virtuose
- Helga Warnecke as Ansagerin
- Axel Triebel as Bankier
- Erika Görner as Frau Specht
- Harry Förster as Mann mit Hakennase
- Maria Milde as Winnie
- Martin Rosen as Jensen
- Eva Sieg as Clarissa

== Bibliography ==
- Kruschel, Karsten (2007). "Leim für die Venus. Der Science-Fiction-Film in der DDR". In Mamczak, Sascha; Jeschke, Wolfgang (eds.). Das Science Fiction Jahr 2007. Munich: Heyne. pp. 803–888. ISBN 978-3-453-52261-9.
