= Nights on the Nile =

1949 film directed by Arthur Maria Rabenalt

- Directed by: Arthur Maria Rabenalt
- Written by: Bobby E. Lüthge (musical); Ernst Hasselbach
- Produced by: Frank Clifford
- Starring: Sonja Ziemann; Wolfgang Lukschy; Kurt Seifert
- Cinematography: Friedl Behn-Grund
- Edited by: Walter Wischniewsky
- Music by: Friedrich Schröder
- Production company: Cordial-Film
- Distributed by: Herzog Film
- Release date: 21 October 1949
- Running time: 102 minutes
- Country: Germany
- Language: German

Nights on the Nile (German: Nächte am Nil) is a 1949 West German musical comedy film directed by Arthur Maria Rabenalt and starring Sonja Ziemann, Wolfgang Lukschy and Kurt Seifert. It was shot at the Tempelhof Studios in West Berlin and on location around the city including along the River Havel. The film's sets were designed by the art director Emil Hasler and Walter Kutz.

== Cast ==
- Sonja Ziemann as Susanne
- Wolfgang Lukschy as Dr. Robert Dirig - Schriftsteller
- Kurt Seifert as Paul Kleinke - Möbelfabrikant
- Ina Caroll as Evelyne Miranda - Stummfilmstar
- Gerd Frickhöffer as Dr. Jacques Ramborn - Scheidungsanwalt
- Ralph Lothar as Ricardo Cabanera - Kunstflieger
- Aribert Wäscher as Film Producer
- Fritz Böttger as Film Director
- Walter Gross as Aufnahmeleiter Kapitzke
- Guido Goroll as Cinematographer
- Antônio Miro as Meier
- Charlotte Renner as Sekretärin
- Franz Weber as Sperling - Gerichtsvollzieher
- Günther Keil as Ansager im Stummfilmkino
- Herbert von Boxberger as Liebhaber im Stummfilm
- Louis Brody as an Egyptian man

== Bibliography ==
- Bock, Hans-Michael; Bergfelder, Tim, eds. (2009). The Concise Cinegraph: Encyclopaedia of German Cinema. New York: Berghahn Books. ISBN 978-1-57181-655-9.
