= Tilly Lauenstein =

German actress (1916–2002)

- Born: 28 July 1916; Bad Homburg vor der Höhe, German Empire
- Died: 8 May 2002 (aged 85); Potsdam, Germany
- Occupation: Actress
- Years active: 1936–2000

Tilly Lauenstein (1916–2002) was a German film and television actress. She appeared as Gerda Hofer in the b/w TV series "Alle Meine Tiere" as wife of veterinary surgeon Dr. Karl Hofer (Gustav Knuth).

== Partial filmography ==
- Herbstmanöver (1936) - Magd
- Das große Abenteuer (1938)
- Chemistry and Love (1948) - Martina Höller
- Das Mädchen Christine (1949) - Courasche
- Anonymous Letters (1949) - Anita Grauberg
- The Stronger Woman (1953) - Dr. Hanna Claassen
- Stresemann (1957)
- Escape from Sahara (1958)
- Madeleine Tel. 13 62 11 (1958) - Thekla - Aging Call Girl
- For Love and Others (1959) - Maria von Stammer
- Menschen im Hotel (1959) - Madame Grusinskaja (voice, uncredited)
- Sweetheart of the Gods (1960)
- The Last Witness (1960) - Aufseherin
- Und sowas nennt sich Leben (1961) - Frau Schlösser
- Adorable Julia (1962) - Evie, Julias Zofe
- Only a woman (1962) - Mrs. Starke
- Black Market of Love (1966) - Countess
- The Oldest Profession (1967) - (segment "Belle époque, La")
- The College Girl Murders (1967) - Harriet Foster
- Klassenkeile (1969) - Marianne Kettelhut
- De Sade (1969) - Madame Grandcon
- Helgalein (1969)
- The Sex Nest (1970) - Ehefrau Clarissa Zibell
- ...aber Jonny! (1973) - Frau Rotter
- Once Upon a Time (1973) - Stiefmutter Pulle (voice)
- Looping (1981) - Carmen (voice, uncredited)
- Angry Harvest (1985) - Frau Kaminska
- Otto – Der Film (1985) - Dame
- Whopper Punch 777 (1986) - Dame mit Hut
- Young Love: Lemon Popsicle 7 (1987) - Lili Rosenberg (voice, uncredited)
- Himmelsheim (1988) - FrauPokorny
- Buster's Bedroom (1991) - Mrs. Noah
- Cosimas Lexikon (1992) - Charlotte Steinhöfel
- Night Time (1998) - Grandmother
- Otto – Der Katastrofenfilm (2000) - Old Woman with Dog (final film role)

== Bibliography ==
- Goble, Alan (1999). The Complete Index to Literary Sources in Film. Berlin: Walter de Gruyter. ISBN 978-3-11-095194-3.
