= An Evening Visit =

1934 film

- Film poster
- German: Besuch am Abend
- Directed by: Georg Jacoby
- Written by: Wendl (play); Georg C. Klaren; Bobby E. Lüthge
- Produced by: Hans Geishauer
- Starring: Liane Haid; Paul Hörbiger; Harald Paulsen
- Cinematography: Robert Baberske
- Edited by: Alice Ludwig
- Music by: Willy Engel-Berger
- Production company: Patria-Film
- Release date: 12 December 1934
- Running time: 86 minutes
- Country: Germany
- Language: German

An Evening Visit (German: Besuch am Abend) is a 1934 German comedy film directed by Georg Jacoby and starring Liane Haid, Paul Hörbiger and Harald Paulsen.

The film's sets were designed by the art directors Gustav A. Knauer and Alexander Mügge.

== Cast ==
- Liane Haid as Lydia, eine Tänzerin
- Paul Hörbiger as Karl Maria Fernebeck, Prokurist
- Harald Paulsen as Bobby, Lydias Partner
- Jakob Tiedtke as Alois Berger
- Elfriede Jera as Sabine, seine Tochter
- Erika Glässner as Frau Lukesch
- Karl Günther as Bruno, Fernebecks Freund
- Gustl Gstettenbaur as an office messenger
- Lieselotte Ebel as Karola
- Katja Bennefeld
- Else Bötticher
- Maja Feist
- Walter Gross
- Lieselotte Heßler
- Kurt Seifert as Variety director
- Henriette Steinmann
- Hella Thornegg
- Elsa Wagner
- Josef Zampa
