= The Little Czar =

1954 film directed by Arthur Maria Rabenalt

- German film poster
- German: Der Zarewitsch
- Directed by: Arthur Maria Rabenalt
- Written by: Gabriela Zapolska (play); Bela Jenbach (libretto); Heinz Reichert (libretto); Georges Neveux; Pierre Gaspard-Huit; Hans Rameau; Roger Richebé
- Produced by: Artur Brauner; Roger Richebé
- Starring: Luis Mariano; Sonja Ziemann; Iván Petrovich
- Cinematography: Georg Bruckbauer
- Edited by: Martha Dübber
- Music by: Franz Lehár (operetta); Friedrich Mögle
- Production companies: CCC Film; Films Roger Richebé
- Distributed by: Gloria Film; Films Roger Richebé
- Release date: 12 October 1954
- Running time: 94 minutes
- Countries: France; West Germany
- Language: German

The Little Czar (German: Der Zarewitsch) is a 1954 French-German historical drama film directed by Arthur Maria Rabenalt and starring Luis Mariano, Sonja Ziemann and Iván Petrovich. It is based on the operetta Der Zarewitsch by Franz Lehár. It was shot in Eastmancolor.

The film was shot at Berlin's Spandau Studios and on location in Belgrade and Dubrovnik, then in Yugoslavia. The sets were designed by the art director Fritz Moegle.

== Cast ==
- Luis Mariano as Luis Mariano / Aljoscha
- Sonja Ziemann as Sonja / Sonja Ilyanova
- Iván Petrovich as Großherzog Feodor
- Hans Richter as Boris
- Paul Henckels as Pawlitsch
- Ernst Waldow as Pjotroff
- Irina Garden as Prinzessin Olga von Meinigen-Deinigen
- Hanne-Lore Morell as Katja / Katja
- Maria Sebaldt as Mascha
- Axel Monjé
- Gerd Frickhöffer as Wassili
- Edelweiß Malchin
- Belgrade Ballet Theatre National

== See also ==
- The Tsarevich (1929), also with Iván Petrovich
- The Tsarevich (1933)
