= Wedding in the Hay =

1951 film directed by Arthur Maria Rabenalt

- Directed by: Arthur Maria Rabenalt
- Written by: Hans Gustl Kernmayr; Alexander Lix
- Based on: Doppelselbstmord (play) by Ludwig Anzengruber
- Produced by: Frank Clifford; Ernest Müller
- Starring: Oskar Sima; Inge Egger; Kurt Seifert
- Cinematography: Hans Heinz Theyer
- Edited by: Johanna Meisel
- Music by: Albert Fischer
- Production companies: Cordial-Film; Schönbrunn-Film
- Distributed by: Ring-Film
- Release date: 11 January 1951
- Running time: 89 minutes
- Countries: Austria; West Germany
- Language: German

Wedding in the Hay (German: Hochzeit im Heu) is a 1951 Austrian-German comedy film directed by Arthur Maria Rabenalt and starring Oskar Sima, Inge Egger and Kurt Seifert. It was shot at the Schönbrunn Studios in Vienna and the Bavaria Studios in Munich. The film's sets were designed by the art director Felix Smetana.

== Synopsis ==
In rural Bavaria the violent antagonism between the heads of two farming families, the Sentners and the Hauderers, causes problems for their respective son and daughter who are in love and wish to marry.

== Cast ==
- Oskar Sima as Vitus Sentner
- Inge Egger as Agerl Hauderer
- Kurt Seifert as Egon Hasse, Fotograf
- Dagny Servaes as Theres Sentner
- Lotte Lang as Liesl Furchtsam, Krämerin
- Helli Servi as Genoveva
- Joseph Egger as Ferdinand Hauderer
- Fritz Lehmann as Poldl Sentner
- Josef Zechell as Weckerl, Bader und Heiratsvermittler
- Hugo Lindinger as Hölzlbauer
- Franz Muxeneder
- Franz Burgsteiner
- Josef Enzenberger
- Sepp Stockklauser
- Franz Wimmer
- Josef Fuchs
- Erika Hackinger
- Hans Maiberger
- Marieliese Tamele

== See also ==
- Double Suicide (1918)

== Bibliography ==
- Fritsche, Maria. Homemade Men In Postwar Austrian Cinema: Nationhood, Genre and Masculinity . Berghahn Books, 2013.
- Von Dassanowsky, Robert. Austrian Cinema: A History. McFarland, 2005.
