= Katja Bennefeld =

German actress

- Occupation: Actress
- Years active: 1932-1939 (film)

Katja Bennefeld was a German film actress, active in the 1930s.

== Selected filmography ==
- Impossible Love (1932)
- Eight Girls in a Boat (1932)
- The Champion of Pontresina (1934)
- An Evening Visit (1934)
- I for You, You for Me (1934)
- The Two Seals (1934)
- Sergeant Schwenke (1935)
- After Midnight (1938)
- Rubber (1938)
- You and I (1938)
- Water for Canitoga (1939)

== Bibliography ==
- Giesen, Rolf. Nazi Propaganda Films: a History and Filmography. McFarland & Co., 2003.
