= The Reluctant Maharaja =

1950 film

- Directed by: Ákos Ráthonyi
- Written by: Artur Brauner; Kurt Bortfeldt
- Produced by: Artur Brauner
- Starring: Olga Tschechowa; Kurt Seifert; Sonja Ziemann
- Cinematography: Ekkehard Kyrath
- Edited by: Johanna Meisel
- Music by: Friedrich Schröder
- Production company: CCC Film
- Distributed by: Lloyd Film
- Release date: 1 June 1950
- Running time: 85 minutes
- Country: West Germany
- Language: German

The Reluctant Maharaja (German: Maharadscha wider Willen) is a 1950 West German comedy film directed by Ákos Ráthonyi and starring Olga Tschechowa, Kurt Seifert and Sonja Ziemann. It was shot at the Spandau Studios in Berlin. The film's sets were designed by the art directors Willi Herrmann and Heinrich Weidemann.

== Synopsis ==
When a barber develops a miracle hair tonic his quest to secure funding at a luxury hotel leads to him being mistaken for wealthy Indian maharaja. Thrust into a world of high society, he is frantically trying to maintain his extravagant disguise while trying to market his hair-growth formula.

== Cast ==
- Olga Tschechowa as Susanne de Bogne - Journalistin
- Kurt Seifert as Karl Brummer - Fabrikant
- Sonja Ziemann as Brigitte Brummer - seine Tochter
- Rudolf Prack as Jonny Williams - Sekretär des Maharadschas
- Iván Petrovich as Der Maharadscha von Hatschipur
- Hubert von Meyerinck as Knirps - Generalsekretärs des Wunderfriseurs
- Rudolf Platte as Breugel - Bürgermeister von Zet
- Georg Thomalla as Attentäter
- Walter Gross as Verkäufer
- Bruno Fritz as Arthur - Tankwart
- Rita Paul as Elvira - Sängerin
- Hans Schwarz Jr. as Schmied
- Henry Lorenzen as Fakir von Azra
- Charlotte Ander as Verkäuferin
- Rudi Schuricke as Wunderfriseur

== Bibliography ==
- Beever. Antony. The Mystery of Olga Chekhova. Penguin, 2005.
- Bock, Hans-Michael & Bergfelder, Tim. The Concise CineGraph. Encyclopedia of German Cinema. Berghahn Books, 2009.
