= The Love of the Maharaja =

1936 film directed by Arthur Maria Rabenalt

- German: Die Liebe des Maharadscha
- Directed by: Arthur Maria Rabenalt
- Written by: Georg C. Klaren
- Starring: Gustav Diessl; Attila Hörbiger; Hilde von Stolz
- Cinematography: Ubaldo Arata
- Edited by: Fernando Tropea
- Music by: Franz Grothe
- Production companies: Astra Film; Bavaria Film
- Distributed by: Bavaria Film
- Release date: 15 April 1936
- Country: Germany
- Language: German

The Love of the Maharaja (German: Die Liebe des Maharadscha) is a 1936 German drama film directed by Arthur Maria Rabenalt and starring Gustav Diessl, Attila Hörbiger and Hilde von Stolz. It was made as a co-production between the Italian Astra Film and the Munich-based Bavaria Film. A separate Italian version A Woman Between Two Worlds was also produced.

It was shot at the Cines Studios in Rome. The film's sets were designed by the art director Hans Ledersteger.

== Cast ==
- Gustav Diessl as Maharadscha
- Attila Hörbiger as Dr. Lawburn
- Hilde von Stolz as Daisy Atkins
- Isa Miranda as Mira Salviati
- Váša Příhoda as Stefan Claudius
- Anton Pointner as Trenchman
- Marjan Lex as Uschi as Zofe
- Rudolf Carl as Ferdl
- Hans Loibner as Xaver
- Robert Valberg as Lord Winston
- Mihail Xantho as Hotel director
