= Lady Harrington =

1926 film

- Directed by: Hewitt Claypoole Grantham-Hayes; Fred LeRoy Granville
- Written by: Maurice Level (novel)
- Starring: Claude France; Maurice de Féraudy; Warwick Ward
- Cinematography: Enzo Riccioni; James E. Rogers
- Production company: Argus Film
- Distributed by: Grandes Productions Cinématographiques
- Release date: 8 October 1926
- Country: France
- Languages: Silent; French intertitles

Lady Harrington is a 1926 French silent film directed by Hewitt Claypoole Grantham-Hayes and Fred LeRoy Granville and starring Claude France, Maurice de Féraudy and Warwick Ward. It is based on a novel by Maurice Level.

== Cast ==
- Claude France as Lady Harrington
- Maurice de Féraudy as Bréhaut
- Warwick Ward as Comte de Jaugé
- Joë Hamman as James Barker
- Charley Sov as Marquis de Forteville
- Francine Mussey as Catherine Bréhaut
- André Dubosc as Plessis-Renaud
- Jean-François Martial as Foulard, dit le Fox
- Choura Barrach
- Nathalie Greuze as Laura Boggioli
- Jacques Henley as Rivalta
- Raymond de Sarka

== Bibliography ==
- Goble, Alan. The Complete Index to Literary Sources in Film. Walter de Gruyter, 1999.
