= Paganini in Venice =

1929 film

- Directed by: Frank Clifford
- Written by: Walter Merstetten
- Produced by: Guido Bagier
- Starring: Andreas Weißgerber; Hans Hermann Schaufuß; Ágnes Esterházy
- Cinematography: Max Brink
- Music by: Werner R. Heymann
- Production company: Tobis Film
- Distributed by: Deutsche Lichtspiel-Syndikat
- Release date: 18 April 1929
- Country: Germany
- Language: German

Paganini in Venice (German: Paganini in Venedig) is a 1929 German short historical film directed by Frank Clifford and starring Andreas Weißgerber, Hans Hermann Schaufuß, and Ágnes Esterházy. It was made by the newly formed Tobis Film during the switch from silent to sound film.

The film's sets were designed by the art director Erich Czerwonski.

== Cast ==
- Andreas Weißgerber as Nicolò Paganini
- Hans Hermann Schaufuß as Dottore Damoni
- Ágnes Esterházy as Giulietta Avorisi
- Victor Colani as Cesare Toma, ihr Verlobter
- Marianne Ceconie as Amelita, Giuliettas Vertraute
- Wilhelm Gombert as Gondoliere

== Bibliography ==
- Bock, Hans-Michael; Bergfelder, Tim, eds. (2009). The Concise Cinegraph: Encyclopaedia of German Cinema. New York: Berghahn Books. ISBN 978-1-57181-655-9.
