= Andreas Weißgerber =

Austrian-Hungarian violinist

Andreas Weißgerber (10 January 1900 – 26 December 1941), also known as Chanosch Ben Mosche Weißgerber, was an Austrian-Hungarian violinist.

== Life ==
Weissgerber came from a Jewish family with roots in Sagadora near Czernowitz in Bukovina; a place at the easternmost end of the k.u.k. Monarchy famous for its miracle rabbis. The Weissgerbers settled in the Greek town of Volos (Βόλος), where Andreas was born on 10 January 1900, shortly before they moved on to Smyrna (today İzmir, Turkey), Andreas received his first violin lessons in Athens.

A violin-playing prodigy, he performed in the major cities of the Ottoman Empire at the age of seven; he once played in Constantinople for the Sultan Abdul Hamid II, who gave him five parrots as a reward. Weissgerber attended the music academies of Budapest and Vienna, most recently studying at the Musikhochschule in Berlin. In Budapest, his teacher was Jenő Hubay (1858–1937), with whom also József Szigeti, Emil Telmányi, Jenő Ormándy and Paul Godwin had enjoyed lessons. In Berlin, it was Issay Barmas (1872–1946), a native of Odesa, who taught at the Stern Conservatory cf. Frick pp. 31–32; for example, the violinist and chapel director Dajos Béla also studied with Barmas.

In the 1920s, Weissgerber made concert tours through the Weimar Republic, during which the composer Rudolf Wagner-Régeny accompanied him at the piano. They took him to the smallest provincial towns. He was also a popular guest on German radio stations. Important artists of his time such as Lovis Corinth, Max Liebermann and Max Slevogt made portraits of Weissgerber. Their appearance in the contemporary illustrated press documented his popularity.

With Eugen d'Albert at the piano, he made recordings for Odeon. He also recorded for VOX. There, Karol Szreter was his piano accompanist. He, his brother Joseph on cello and Claudio Arrau at the piano could be heard as the "Andreas Weißgerber-Trio".

After the Machtergreifung by the Nazis, when he was only allowed to perform at events of the Kulturbund Deutscher Juden, he played for the label "Lukraphon", which was exclusively for Jewish artists. The owner was called Moritz Lewin and had his business premises in Berlin at Friedrichstrasse 208 and Grenadierstrasse 28, cf. Lotz. There, Kurt Sanderling sat at the piano. As late as 1935, he gave a concert together with the pianist Richard Goldschmied (1880–1941) at the Jewish Cultural Association in Hamburg, at which works by Igor Stravinsky were performed, among others, whose music was by then considered degenerate music.

In 1936, he followed his two years younger brother Joseph (1902–1954), who had played as principal cellist with the Dresden Philharmonic and had already left Germany in 1933, to emigrate to Palestine. Both have been invited by Bronisław Huberman to play in the symphony orchestra of Palestine, later the Israel Philharmonic Orchestra. Weissgerber is considered a co-founder of this orchestra, of which he became concertmaster.

Weißgerber appeared in a short film Paganini in Venice in 1929.

A sound film, Shir Ivri (Hebrew Melody), (1935) which was produced at this time with his participation for the Reichsverband der jüdischen Kulturbünde in Deutschland, had only recently been found among his brother's estate and has since been re-released.

The Riga native composer Marc Lavry wrote a concerto for violin and orchestra (op. 78) for Weissgerber with the movements Allegro Moderato (Marcia), Andante and Allegro Assai, which he performed with the Palestine Radio Symphony Orchestra on 20 June 1939.

Weissgerber died of a heart attack on 26 December 1941 in Tel Aviv aged 41.

== Recordings ==
=== For Odeon ===
- 1921: Zigeunerweisen (Pablo de Sarasate)
- 1923: Andante Sostenuto aus der C-dur Sonate (Mozart) (Odeon)
- 1923: Scherzo und Rondo aus der Frühlingssonate (Beethoven)
- 1923: Two movements (the Rondo is heavily cut) from Beethoven's Violin Sonata in F, Op 24
- unknown year: Ungarische Tänze Nr. 2 and 5
- unknown year: Csárdás / Hubay.

=== For Vox ===
- Trio, B-Dur, op. 11 : Adagio / Beethoven
- Trio, B-Dur, op. 11 : Thema mit Variationen / Beethoven.
- Trio, B-Dur, op. 99 : Scherzo / Schubert.
- Trio, Es-Dur, op. 99 : Scherzo / Fr. Schubert.

=== For Lukraphon ===
- Hebräische Melodie (Achron)
- Andantino (Martini)
- Csárdás (Hubay)
- Spanish danse from the opera La Vida Breve (Manuel de Falla)

=== Reissues ===
- Horst J.P. Bergmeier, Ejal Jakob Eisler, Rainer E. Lotz: Vorbei. Dokumentation jüdischen Musiklebens in Berlin, 1933–1938. (Beyond Recall. A record of Jewish musical life in Nazi Berlin, 1933–1938). Bear Family, Holste-Oldendorf 2001, DNB-IDN 974923648.
- CD “EUGEN D'ALBERT (1864–1932)” by Symposium Records, 4, Arden Close, Overstrand, North Norfolk NR27 0PH, U.K. (Symposium Catalogue No: 1146, Release Date: Aug 01, 1994, replaces CD1046) enthält von Weissgerber / D'Albert die Odeon-Aufnahmen Andante Sostenuto aus der C-dur Sonate (Mozart) und Scherzo und Rondo aus der Frühlingssonate (Beethoven), both from 1923.
- Doppel-CD “The Centaur Pianist”: Eugen d'Albert, Complete Studio Recordings, 1910–1928. label: Arbiter; Release date 28 February 2006; Katalognr.: 147; enthält auf CD 2 Aufnahmen mit Andreas Weissgerber: track 17 : Violin Sonata In C, K. 296: Andante Sostenuto (Mozart), track 18 : Violin Sonata In F, Op. 24: I. Scherzo (Beethoven), track 19 : Violin Sonata In F, Op. 24: II. Rondo (Beethoven)
