= Francine Mussey =

French actress (1897–1933)

- Born: Marcelle Fromholt; 6 October 1897; Paris, Île-de-France, France
- Died: 23 March 1933 (aged 35); Paris, Île-de-France, France
- Occupation: Actress
- Years active: 1920–1932

Francine Mussey (6 October 1897 – 23 March 1933) was a French film actress whose career began in the silent film era of the 1920s and ended in 1933 when she committed suicide by ingesting poison at age 35.

Mussey was born in the 18th arrondissement of Paris as Marcelle Fromholt in 1897. She made her debut in the 1920 Lucien Lehmann-directed film L'épave, opposite actors Marcel Bonneau and Jean-François Martial. She would go on to appear in a number of films throughout the 1920s and into the sound film era of the early 1930s directed by Louis Feuillade, Gaston Ravel, Alexandre Ryder and Jean Daumery, among others. She appeared in the 1927 epic Napoléon which ran for five and a half hours.

== Selected filmography ==
- The House of Mystery (1923)
- The Man in the Saddle (1925)
- Lady Harrington (1926)
- Napoleon (1927)
- The Woman Who Couldn't Say No (1927)
- Buridan's Donkey (1932)
