= The Man in the Saddle (1945 film) =

1945 film directed by Harry Piel

- Directed by: Harry Piel
- Written by: Hanns Marschall; Werner Scheff (novel)
- Starring: Harry Piel
- Cinematography: Eugen Klagemann
- Edited by: Arnfried Heyne
- Music by: Werner Schmidt-Boelcke
- Production company: Tobis Film
- Release date: 1945
- Country: Germany
- Language: German

The Man in the Saddle (German: Der Mann im Sattel) is a 1945 German film directed by and starring Harry Piel.

The film's sets were designed by the art director Gabriel Pellon.

The film was previously thought to have been lost since 1945. However, in the 1990s, the film was found in an East German archive and had a premiere in 2000 in Berlin.

== Cast ==
In alphabetical order

- Valy Arnheim as Ganove
- Ellen Bang as Steffi
- Paul Bildt as Kommissar Hentschke
- Eduard Bornträger
- Egon Brosig
- Charlott Daudert as Ossi la Planta
- Erich Dunskus
- Herbert Gernot as Kommissar
- Otto Graf as Fritz Thermälen
- Walter Gross as Arzt
- Kurt Hagen
- Clemens Hasse as Otto Bruck
- Karl Hellmer as Wilhelm
- Irmgard Krohn
- Alwin Lippisch
- Edgar Pauly
- Harry Piel as Trainer Roberts
- Karl Platen as Gastwirt
- Josef Reithofer
- Walter Ruesta
- Just Scheu
- Kurt Seifert as Paul, Futtermeister
- Ute Sielisch
- Michael von Newlinsky
- Genia von Unruh
- Elsa Wagner as Haushälterin
- Karl Wagner
- Aruth Wartan as Trunkenbold
- Gerhild Weber as Lisa Freyberg
- Ewald Wenck as Zeuge
- Paul Westermeier as Reinhold Schirmer
- Peter Widmann as Nicco Jersonf
- Anneliese Würtz
- Hans Zesch-Ballot as Dr. Gustl Gallinger

== See also ==
- Überläufer
- The Man in the Saddle (1925)
- List of films about horses

== Bibliography ==
- Rentschler, Eric. The Ministry of Illusion: Nazi Cinema and Its Afterlife. Harvard University Press, 1996.
