= A Gust of Wind =

1942 film

- Directed by: Walter Felsenstein
- Written by: Giovacchino Forzano (play); Roland Schacht; Walter Felsenstein
- Produced by: Fred Lyssa
- Starring: Paul Kemp; Margit Debar; Elsa Wagner
- Cinematography: E.W. Fiedler
- Edited by: Ilse Voigt
- Music by: Friedrich Schröder
- Production company: Tobis Film
- Distributed by: Deutsche Filmvertriebs
- Release date: 23 April 1942
- Running time: 76 minutes
- Country: Germany
- Language: German

A Gust of Wind (German: Ein Windstoß) is a 1942 German musical film directed by Walter Felsenstein and starring Paul Kemp, Margit Debar and Elsa Wagner. It was based on an Italian play by Giovacchino Forzano. A man gets shut out of his apartment in his nightshirt by a gust of wind. His neighbours refuse to believe this is the real reason. The film marked the screen debut of Sonja Ziemann who went on to become a leading star of the 1950s.

== Main cast ==
- Paul Kemp as Emanuele Rigattieri
- Margit Debar as Angelina Seri
- Elsa Wagner as Frau Brigoni
- Sonja Ziemann as Gina Galassi
- Franz Schafheitlin as Gerichtsvorsitzender
- Heinrich Troxbömker as Portier
- Ursula Herking as Teresina Bonfanti
- Lina Carstens as Frau Galassi

== Bibliography ==
- Hull, David Stewart (1969). Film in the Third Reich: A Study of the German Cinema, 1933–1945. University of California Press. ISBN 978-0-520-01489-3.
