= Friedrich Schröder =

Swiss composer (1910–1972)

Friedrich Schröder (6 August 1910 – 25 September 1972) was a Swiss composer of what could be referred to as light music.

== Career ==
Born in Näfels, Switzerland, Schröder studied music in Stuttgart, Münster, and Berlin. Already in those early days he wrote film scores. For a short period between 1934 and 1937 he also worked as a Kapellmeister. He composed a number of operettas and Schlager, many of which have been popular ever since.

Schröder died in West Berlin, aged 62.

== Operettas ==
- Wedding Night in Paradise (1942; filmed in 1962 starring Peter Alexander, Marika Rökk, and Waltraut Haas)
- Nächte in Changhai
- Chanel Nr.5
- Das Bad auf der Tenne
- Die große Welt
- Isabella

== Schlager ==
- "Ich tanze mit dir in den Himmel hinein"
- "So stell ich mir die Liebe vor"
- "Man müsste Klavier spielen können" (sung by Johannes Heesters et al.)
- "Liebling, was wird nun aus uns beiden?"
- "Komm mit mir nach Tahiti"
- "Die Negermama singt ein uraltes Lied"
- "Gnädige Frau wo war'n sie gestern?" ( a tango sung by Theo Lingen et al.)
- "Träume kann man nicht verbieten"

== Selected filmography ==
- Man for Man (1939)
- Small Town Poet (1940)
- Her Private Secretary (1940)
- A Gust of Wind (1942)
- My Friend Josephine (1942)
- The Big Number (1943)
- Peter Voss, Thief of Millions (1946)
- Nights on the Nile (1949)
- The Reluctant Maharaja (1950)
- Professor Nachtfalter (1951)
- Shooting Stars (1952)
- A Very Big Child (1952)
- The Divorcée (1953)
- Hit Parade (1953)
- The Private Secretary (1953)
- My Sister and I (1954)
- The Bath in the Barn (1956)
- Voyage to Italy, Complete with Love (1958)
- Her Most Beautiful Day (1962)
- Breakfast in Bed (1963)
