= Kurt Seifert =

- Born: 4 July 1903; Essen, German Empire
- Died: 3 December 1950 (aged 47); West Berlin, West Germany
- Occupations: Film actor, singer, comedian

Kurt Seifert (4 July 1903 – 3 December 1950) was a German actor, singer, comedian, and in his later years, theatre director. Seifert was known as an operetta singer. From 1934 onwards he appeared in a significant number of feature films, sometimes in the lead as in Robert and Bertram (1939) but also in supporting roles. By the time he died in 1950, he had performed in forty-five films.

== Selected filmography ==
- The Island (1934) - Der Korpulente
- Love and the First Railway (1934)
- An Evening Visit (1934) - Der Varieté-Direktor
- Liebeslied (1935)
- Stjenka Rasin (1936)
- The Castle in Flanders (1936) - Hotelportier
- Glückskinder (1936) - Restaurateur
- Intermezzo (1936) - Don Ramiro
- Und du mein Schatz fährst mit (1937) - Juwelier
- Patriots (1937) - Alphonse
- Tango Notturno (1937) - Webster
- The Roundabouts of Handsome Karl (1938) - Pferde-Wenzel
- Das Mädchen mit dem guten Ruf (1938) - Bob - ein Amerikaner
- The Great and the Little Love (1938) - Heinrod
- Nights in Andalusia (1938) - Juan
- Das Leben kann so schön sein (1938) - Generaldirektor der Versicherung
- Sergeant Berry (1938) - Alcalde (uncredited)
- Robert and Bertram (1939) - Bertram
- Der dunkle Punkt (1940)
- Mistress Moon (1941) - Paul Lindemann
- The Gasman (1941) - Finanzbeamter (uncredited)
- Krach im Vorderhaus (1941) - Hermann Schultze
- The Thing About Styx (1942) - Eugene
- So ein Früchtchen (1942)
- We Make Music (1942) - Hugo Bratzberger
- A Waltz with You (1943) - Müller, Direktor des Weltverlags
- Das seltsame Fräulein Sylvia (1945)
- The Man in the Saddle (1945) - Paul, Futtermeister
- Peter Voss, Thief of Millions (1946) - Petterson
- Vor uns liegt das Leben (1946) - Pfisterer, Gastwirt
- Somewhere in Berlin (1946)
- Anonymous Letters (1949) - Gregor Mauermann - Bauunternehmer
- Nights on the Nile (1949) - Paul Kleinke - Möbelfabrikant
- By a Nose (1949) - Teddy, Barbesitzer
- Wedding with Erika (1950) - Baron Kroko
- One Night Apart (1950) - Heinrich Pogge
- The Reluctant Maharaja (1950) - Karl Brummer - Fabrikant
- Verlobte Leute (1950)
- When Men Cheat (1950) - Arthur Bamberg, Seidenfabrikant, ihr Mann
- The Black Forest Girl (1950)
- Wedding in the Hay (1951) - Egon Hasse, Fotograf
- Eva im Frack (1951) - Hübner, Posaunist (final film role)

== Bibliography ==
- O'Brien, Mary-Elizabeth. Nazi Cinema as Enchantment: The Politics of Entertainment in the Third Reich. Camden House, 2006.
