= Willy Richartz =

German composer and conductor

- Born: 25 September 1900; Cologne, German Empire
- Died: 8 August 1972 (aged 71); Bad Tölz, Bavaria, West Germany
- Occupation: Composer

Willy Richartz (1900–1972) was a German composer and conductor.

== Selected filmography ==
- Sergeant Schwenke (1935)

== Bibliography ==
- Lutz Peter Koepnick. The Dark Mirror: German Cinema Between Hitler and Hollywood. University of California Press, 2002.
