= Ann Höling =

German actress (1925–2005)

- Born: 22 April 1925; Idar-Oberstein, Rhineland-Palatinate, Germany
- Died: 4 November 2005 (aged 80); India
- Occupation: Actress
- Years active: 1948-2003 (film and TV)

Ann Höling (1925–2005) was a German stage, film and television actress.

== Selected filmography ==
- Chemistry and Love (1948)
- Und wieder 48 (1948)
- Anonymous Letters (1949)
- Unknown Sender (1950)
- Not Without Gisela (1951)
- Stips (1951)
- Big City Secret (1952)

== Bibliography ==
- Eva Orbanz. Wolfgang Staudte. Spiess, 1977.
