= Albrecht Dümling =

German musicologist (born 1949)

Albrecht Dümling (born 1949) is a German musicologist and music critic.

== Biography ==
Born in Wuppertal, Dümling studied musicology in Essen, Vienna and Berlin and earned a Ph.D. with an interdisciplinary study on Arnold Schoenberg and Stefan George, with Carl Dahlhaus as his mentor. In 1985 he published his comprehensive work on Bertolt Brecht’s collaboration with composers. As a co-founder of the "International Hanns Eisler Society", Dümling was instrumental in creating the new "Gesamtausgabe" (complete edition) of the musical and literary works of the composer.

Following twenty years as music critic for the Berlin newspaper Der Tagesspiegel (1978–1998), Dümling contributed to the Frankfurter Allgemeine Zeitung, "Neue Musik-Zeitung" and several radio programs. He is also an "Honorary Research Associate" at the Royal Holloway, University of London, a "Research Fellow" at the Victorian College of the Arts in Melbourne and a member of the Advisory Board to the "International Centre for Suppressed Music"' in London.

As a scholar at the Getty Center for the History of Art and the Humanities Dümling created an American version of the exhibition „Entartete Musik (degenerate music) in 1989/90, which travelled to more than 50 locations worldwide, including the Royal Festival Hall in London, and the Vienna State Opera. In 2007 he developed a Spanish version of the exhibition for the University of Sevilla, and a revised German version for the Berlin Philharmonic Orchestra.

In 1990, Dümling was appointed chairman of "musica reanimata", a society for the promotion of composers persecuted by the Nazis, which in 2006 was awarded the "German Critics’ Prize". 1992-99 he served as Project Consultant for the DECCA CD-series "Entartete Musik". Following a lecture tour through Australia he was the organiser of the conference “Musical Exile in Australia” in Dresden 1996. From 2000 to 2003 Dümling continued this research project at the Technische Universität Berlin (Zentrum für Antisemitismusforschung), sponsored by the Deutsche Forschungsgemeinschaft. 2004 he received the Harold White Fellowship from the National Library of Australia.

In 1992 Dümling wrote the official biography of German composer Leon Jessel (1871–1942). He revised and republished the biography in 2012.

Dümling was awarded the European Cultural Prize "KAIROS" of the Alfred Toepfer Foundation in Hamburg, for the rediscovery of persecuted musicians.

== Selected bibliography ==
- Dümling, Albrecht. Laßt euch nicht verführen! Brecht und die Musik. München: Kindler, 1985
- Dümling, Albrecht. Die verweigerte Heimat: Leon Jessel, der Komponist des "Schwarzwaldmädel" (The Denied Homeland: Leon Jessel, Composer of "Black Forest Girl"). Düsseldorf: Der kleine Verlag, 1992. Revised in 2012 and published by Lukas Verlag.
- Dümling, Albrecht. Die verschwundenen Musiker: Jüdische Flüchtlinge in Australien. Böhlau Verlag, 2011.
- Albrecht Dümling/Peter Girth (eds). Entartete Musik: Dokumentation und Kommentar zur Düsseldorfer Ausstellung von 1938. Düsseldorf: Der Kleine Verlag, 1988. Expanded edition 1993. ISBN 3-924166-29-3
- Dümling, Albrecht (2003). Musik hat ihren Wert. 100 Jahre musikalische Verwertungsgesellschaft in Deutschland. Regensburg: ConBrio. ISBN 3-932581-58-X.
- Dümling, Albrecht. The Vanished Musicians. Jewish Refugees in Australia. Oxford: Peter Lang, 2016.
