= So You Don't Know Korff Yet? =

1938 German film

- Directed by: Fritz Holl
- Written by: Jacob Geis; Peter Francke
- Produced by: Hans Tost
- Starring: Heinz Rühmann; Victor Janson; Fritz Rasp
- Cinematography: Georg Bruckbauer
- Edited by: Gottlieb Madl
- Music by: Michael Jary
- Production company: Terra Film
- Distributed by: Terra Film
- Release date: 21 December 1938
- Running time: 95 minutes
- Country: Germany
- Language: German

So You Don't Know Korff Yet? (German: Nanu, Sie kennen Korff noch nicht?) is a 1938 German comedy crime film directed by Fritz Holl and starring Heinz Rühmann, Victor Janson and Franz Schafheitlin. It was shot at the Babelsberg Studios in Berlin and on location in Mecklenburg and Holland. The film's sets were designed by the art directors Alfred Bütow and Willi Herrmann. It was produced and distributed by Terra Film, one of the leading film companies in Nazi Germany.

== Synopsis ==
Unwittingly, the celebrated crime novelist Niels Korff has included details in his latest book that closely match the activities of a notorious pair of American criminals. They plan to assassinate him in Amsterdam, while also stealing a valuable Rubens painting. Yet all their schemes to kill him go wrong and he is ultimately able to turn the tables on them.

== Cast ==
- Heinz Rühmann as Niels Korff
- Victor Janson as Dufour
- Franz Schafheitlin as Morton
- Fritz Rasp as Kelley
- Jakob Tiedtke as Vermeylen
- Senta Foltin as Dortje
- Agnes Straub as Philippine Schimmelpennick
- Will Dohm as van Gaalen
- Karl Meixner as Timor
- Viktor Bell as Jim
- Günther Lüders as Inspizient im 'Trocadero'
- Rudolf Platte as Regisseur im 'Trocadero'
- Hubert von Meyerinck as Reporter Droste
- Josefine Dora as Wirtschafterin Antje
- Oskar Höcker as Polizeikommissar

== Bibliography ==
- Klaus, Ulrich J. Deutsche Tonfilme: Jahrgang 1938. Klaus-Archiv, 1988.
