= Ralph Lothar =

German actor and director

- Born: 29 July 1910; Berlin, German Empire
- Died: 14 October 1981 (aged 71); West Berlin, West Germany
- Occupations: Actor, Director
- Years active: 1941-1978 (film and TV)

Ralph Lothar (1910–1981) was a German film actor and director.

== Selected filmography ==
- The Way to Freedom (1941)
- I Entrust My Wife to You (1943)
- And the Heavens Above Us (1947)
- Chemistry and Love (1948)
- Girls Behind Bars (1949)
- Nights on the Nile (1949)
- Quartet of Five (1949)
- After the Rain Comes Sunshine (1949)
- Guitars of Love (1954)
- The Missing Miniature (1954)
- Sergeant Borck (1955)
- One Woman Is Not Enough? (1955)
- Hotel Adlon (1955)
- Black Forest Melody (1956)
- Santa Lucia (1956)
- The Night of the Storm (1957)
- Two Hearts in May (1958)
- Melody of Hate (1962)

== Bibliography ==
- Goble, Alan. The Complete Index to Literary Sources in Film. Walter de Gruyter, 1999.
