= Karl Meixner =

Austrian film actor (1903–1976)

- Born: 13 February 1903; Vienna, Austria-Hungary
- Died: 29 December 1976 (aged 73); West Berlin, West Germany
- Occupation: Actor

Karl Meixner (13 February 1903 – 29 December 1976) was an Austrian film actor.

== Partial filmography ==
- Frederica (1932)
- The Testament of Dr. Mabuse (1933) - Hofmeister
- Hitlerjunge Quex (1933) - Wilde
- Refugees (1933) - Pappel
- The Young Baron Neuhaus (1934)
- Port Arthur (1936)
- Moscow-Shanghai (1936) - Pope
- White Slaves (1937) - Der Scharfrichter
- Men Without a Fatherland (1937) - Ein Aufwiegler
- Another World (1937) - Li, Carters Diener
- Starke Herzen (1937) - Ein aufständiger Kommunist vom Rollkommando
- Dance on the Volcano (1938) - Aufwiegler (uncredited)
- So You Don't Know Korff Yet? (1938) - Timor
- Pour le Mérite (1938) - Führer einer Kommunistenhorde
- The Governor (1939) - Diener bei Dr. Erko
- Bismarck (1940) - Loewe
- Die keusche Geliebte (1940) - Michel - Künstler
- Carl Peters (1941)
- Leichte Muse (1941)
- Wetterleuchten um Barbara (1941)
- Secret File W.B.1 (1942) - Senator
- The Thing About Styx (1942) - Kurier
- Rembrandt (1942)
- Titanic (1943) - Lord Astors 1. Sekretär Hopkins (uncredited)
- The Enchanted Day (1944) - Kriminalbeamter
- The Bridge (1949) - Hagerer
- Dark Eyes (1951) - von Pfandler
- Big City Secret (1952)
- The Land of Smiles (1952) - Exzellenz Tschang
- Cuba Cabana (1952) - Pandulkar
- The Major and the Bulls (1955) - Säusepp-Bauer
- Night of Decision (1956) - Francois
- Die fröhliche Wallfahrt (1956) - Brosel
- Night Nurse Ingeborg (1958) - Patient Krause
- Stalingrad: Dogs, Do You Want to Live Forever? (1959)
- Officer Factory (1960)
- Escape to Berlin (1961)

== Bibliography ==
- Kalat, David. The Strange Case of Dr. Mabuse: A Study of the Twelve Films and Five Novels. McFarland, 2005.
- Rentschler, Eric. The Ministry of Illusion: Nazi Cinema and Its Afterlife. Harvard University Press, 1996.
