= Bandits of the Autobahn =

1955 film

- Directed by: Géza von Cziffra
- Written by: Robert Thoeren; Géza von Cziffra; Wolfgang Neuss
- Produced by: Otto Meissner; Géza von Cziffra
- Starring: Eva Ingeborg Scholz; Hans Christian Blech; Paul Hörbiger
- Cinematography: Albert Benitz
- Edited by: Alice Ludwig
- Music by: Michael Jary
- Production company: Arion-Film
- Distributed by: Columbia Film-Verleih
- Release date: 1 September 1955
- Running time: 100 minutes
- Country: West Germany
- Language: German

Bandits of the Autobahn (German: Banditen der Autobahn) is a 1955 West German crime film directed by Géza von Cziffra and starring Eva Ingeborg Scholz, Hans Christian Blech and Paul Hörbiger.

It was shot at the Göttingen Studios. The art director Albrecht Becker worked on designing the film's sets. The film was distributed by the German subsidiary of Columbia Pictures.

== Cast ==
- Eva Ingeborg Scholz as Eva Berger
- Hans Christian Blech as Willi Kollanski
- Paul Hörbiger as Vater Heinze
- Karl Ludwig Diehl as Polizeirat Gerber
- Hermann Speelmans as Hauptwachtmeister Lüdecke
- Wolfgang Wahl as Franz Möller
- Charles Regnier as Paul Barra
- Klaus Kammer as Bubi
- Hans Schwarz Jr. as Schorsch
- Ellen Schwiers as Else Möller
- Ursula Justin as Margot
- Erich Scholz as Kurt Heinze
- Wolf Ackva as Polizeikommissar Breslau
- Fritz Wagner as Wolfgang Hinz
- Joseph Offenbach as Friseur
- Wolfgang Neuss as Chansonnier
- Armin Schweizer as Knösli
- Ingrid van Bergen as Inge
- Karl Walter Diess as Hannes

== Bibliography ==
- Jaimey Fisher. Generic Histories of German Cinema: Genre and Its Deviations. Boydell & Brewer, 2013.
