= Schwarzwaldmädel =

1917 operetta by Leon Jessel with libretto by August Neidhart

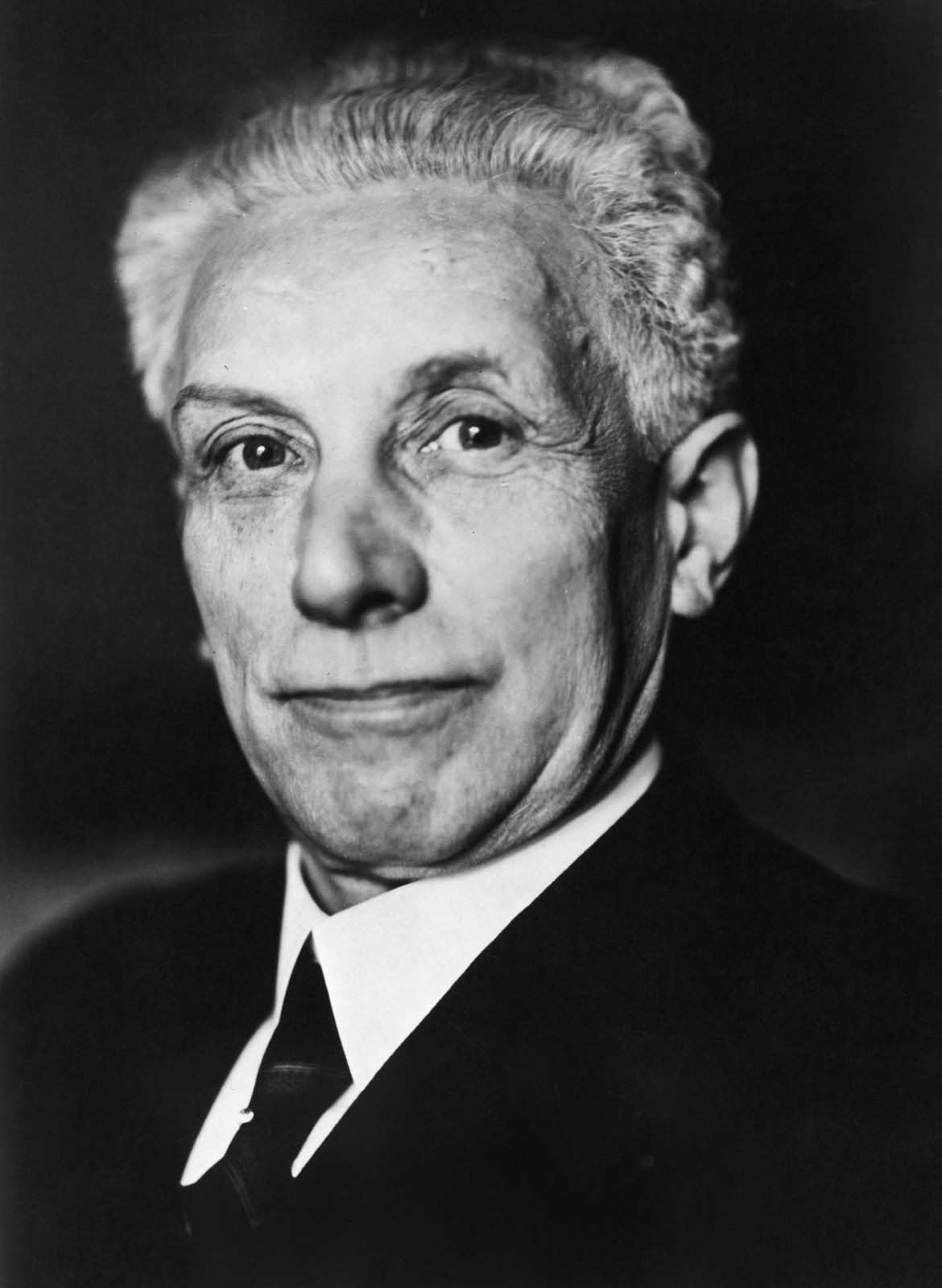
Leon Jessel c. 1933

Schwarzwaldmädel (Black Forest Girl) is a 1917 operetta in three acts by German composer Leon Jessel. The libretto is by August Neidhart, and the operetta premiered on 25 August 1917 at the Alte Komische Oper Berlin. It is the most popular operetta written in Germany.

== Performance history ==
Schwarzwaldmädel premiered at the Alte Komische Oper Berlin on 25 August 1917. The opera's touching libretto, appealing melodies, and elegant instrumentation proved immensely popular. It ran in Berlin for 900 performances, and within the next 10 years was performed approximately 6,000 times in Germany and abroad. The work is by far Leon Jessel's greatest success as an operetta composer, and it catapulted him to the height of the world of European operetta.

With the rise of Nazism in the late 1920s, Jessel, who had converted to Christianity in 1894 but was Jewish by birth, had his music boycotted in Germany as early as 1927. The last Nazi-era performance of Schwarzwaldmädel in Germany was in 1936, and recordings and distribution of Jessel's works were then banned outright within the entire Third Reich by the Reichsmusikkammer in 1937 through the end of World War II. Jessel died in 1942.

Nevertheless, Schwarzwaldmädel has retained its popularity among Germans. It was quickly revived in 1945 and 1946 and remains the most popular operetta composed in Germany. According to Andrew Lamb in 150 Years of Popular Musical Theatre, "Schwarzwaldmädel represented all that was best in continental operetta".

== Roles ==
Roles, voice types, premiere cast
| Role | Voice type | Premiere cast, 25 August 1917 |
|---|---|---|
| Blasius Römer, organ master of the cathedral in the fictional Black Forest village of St. Christoph | baritone | Gustav Charlé |
| Bärbele, Römer's maidservant, an orphan (the title character) | soubrette | Steffi Walidt |
| Hannele, Römer's daughter | soubrette | |
| Jürgen, landlord of the 'Blue Ox' inn, in the village of St. Christoph | basso buffo | |
| Lorle, Jürgen's daughter, in love with Theobald | soprano | |
| Malwine von Hainau, a Berliner visiting the village of St. Christoph for the festival of St. Cecilia | soprano | |
| Hans, a Berliner fleeing from the possessive Malwine | tenor buffo | |
| Richard, Hans's best friend | tenor | |
| Old Woman Traudel, Bärbele's impoverished aunt, mocked as "the old witch" by the village children | non-singing | |
| Schmussheim, a comical vacationer from Berlin | no set range | |
| Theobald, a village boy | tenor | |
Musicians and country folk (chorus)

== Synopsis ==
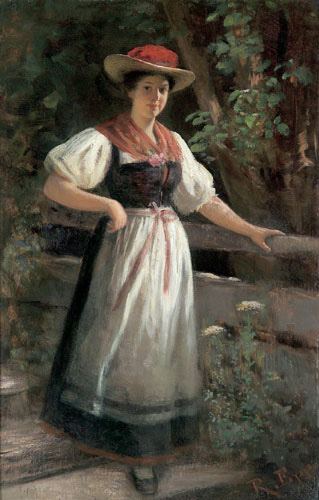
A Black Forest girl, in traditional dress (Schwarzwälderin by Rudolf Epp, ca. 1890)

The picturesque opera takes place in a village in the Black Forest in 1815. It is a complex romantic intrigue centering around two friends from Berlin: Hans and Richard. The girls involved are Hans's current girlfriend Malwine; and Bärbele, the "Black Forest Girl", an orphaned maidservant. Blasius Römer, an aging organ master, is Bärbele's employer, but finds himself secretly attracted to her. After various entanglements and problems, all works out for the best for the young people.

== Recordings ==
Schwarzwaldmädel has been recorded numerous times. A 1976 recording conducted by Willy Mattes, issued on CD in 1997 by EMI, features singers Dagmar Koller, Adolf Dallapozza, Benno Kusche, Brigitte Lindner, and Martin Finke.

A 1953 recording conducted by Franz Marszalek, and issued on CD in 2006, features Gitta Lind, Gretl Schörg, Franz Fehringer, Benno Kusche, and Willy Hofmann. A 2000 EMI CD, which is an anthology of archival recordings, contains selections from Schwarzwaldmädel sung by Hermann Prey, Rudolf Schock, and Erika Köth, along with selected operetta arias and duets by Lehár and Strauss.

== Films ==
Schwarzwaldmädel has been filmed at least six times, as follows:

- Schwarzwaldmädel (1920), directed by Arthur Wellin (silent)
- Schwarzwaldmädel (1929), directed by Victor Janson, with Liane Haid, Fred Louis Lerch, and Walter Janssen (silent)
- Schwarzwaldmädel (1933), directed by Georg Zoch, with Walter Janssen
- Schwarzwaldmädel (1950), directed by Hans Deppe, with Paul Hörbiger, Sonja Ziemann, and Rudolf Prack
- Schwarzwaldmädel (1963), directed by Wilm ten Haaf, with Margitta Scherr and Willy Reichert
- Schwarzwaldmädel (1973), directed by Wolfgang Liebeneiner, with Janet Perry and Wolfgang Windgassen
