= Frank Clifford (producer) =

German film producer

- Born: 13 July 1898; Puppen, East Prussia, German Empire
- Died: 25 April 1976 (aged 77); Mindelheim, Bavaria, West Germany
- Occupations: Producer, Writer, Director
- Years active: 1928–1955 (film)

Frank Clifford (1898–1976) was a German film producer. He was involved in early attempts to pioneer sound film production in Europe, directing the short film Paganini in Venice for Tobis Film. During the early 1930s he worked at the Epinay Studios in Paris, overseeing several films produced by the French subsidiary of Tobis. After the Second World War he worked briefly as a screenwriter for DEFA in East Berlin.

== Selected filmography ==
- Paganini in Venice (1929)
- Under the Roofs of Paris (1930)
- The Shark (1930)
- Le Million (1931)
- À Nous la Liberté (1931)
- The Nude Woman (1932)
- Here's Berlin (1932)
- The Marathon Runner (1933)
- Girls of Today (1933)
- What Am I Without You (1934)
- Pappi (1934)
- Artist Love (1935)
- My Life for Maria Isabella (1935)
- Martha (1936)
- White Slaves (1937)
- Chemistry and Love (1948)
- Das Mädchen Christine (1949)
- Don't Dream, Annette (1949)
- Anonymous Letters (1949)
- Nights on the Nile (1949)
- When Men Cheat (1950)
- Wedding in the Hay (1951)
- We're Dancing on the Rainbow (1952)
- Victoria and Her Hussar (1954)
- Marianne of My Youth (1955)
- The Star of Rio (1955)

== Bibliography ==
- Bock, Hans-Michael; Mosel, Wiebke Annkatrin; Spazier, Ingrun (2003). Die Tobis 1928–1945: Eine kommentierte Filmografie. Munich: Edition Text + Kritik. ISBN 978-3-88377-748-1.
