= Sergeant Schwenke =

1935 film directed by Carl Froelich

- Directed by: Carl Froelich
- Written by: Hans Joachim Freiherr von Reizenstein (novel); Robert A. Stemmle; E. Freiherr v. Spiegel
- Produced by: Carl Froelich
- Starring: Gustav Fröhlich; Marianne Hoppe; Karl Dannemann
- Cinematography: Emil Schünemann
- Edited by: Gustav Lohse
- Music by: Hanson Milde-Meissner; Willy Richartz
- Production company: Carl Froelich Filmproduktion
- Distributed by: Europa-Filmverleih
- Release date: 14 January 1935
- Running time: 90 minutes
- Country: Germany
- Language: German

Sergeant Schwenke (German: Oberwachtmeister Schwenke) is a 1935 German crime drama film directed by Carl Froelich and starring Gustav Fröhlich, Marianne Hoppe and Karl Dannemann. It was made at the former National Studios in Berlin's Tempelhof area which were now controlled by Froelich. The film's sets were designed by the art directors Franz Schroedter and Walter Haag. It is based on a novel of the same title by Hans Joachim Freiherr von Reizenstein. It was remade in 1955 as Sergeant Borck.

== Cast ==
- Gustav Fröhlich as Oberwachtmeister Willi Schwenke
- Marianne Hoppe as Maria Schönborn, Verkäuferin im Blumenhaus Floris
- Karl Dannemann as Oberwachtmeister Wölfert
- Katja Bennefeld as Frau Wölfert, Marias Schwester
- Walter Steinbeck as Baankier Wenkstern
- Emmy Göring as Rena, seine Frau
- Falk May as Hans-Helmut, ihr Sohn
- Ruth Nitsche as Sybille, ihre Tochter
- Sybille Schmitz as Erna Zuwade, Stütze bei Wenkstern
- Ellen Geyer as Emma, Köchin bei Wenkstern
- Herbert Gernot as Fritsch, Chauffeur bei Wenkstern
- Claire Fuchs-Kaufmann as Fanny Mehlmann, Wirtin von 'Fannys gute Stube'
- Valy Arnheim
- Rudolf Biebrach
- Gerhard Bienert
- Anna Dammann
- Bruno Fritz as Ein Stammgast
- Hugo Froelich as Ein Kellner
- Knut Hartwig as Obermeister
- Willy Kaufman
- Maria Krahn
- Anna Müller-Lincke
- Hans Paschen
- Harald Paulsen as Karl Franke
- Oscar Sabo as Radmann
- Georg H. Schnell
- Werner Schott
- Leo Sloma

== Bibliography ==
- Goble, Alan (1999). The Complete Index to Literary Sources in Film. Berlin: De Gruyter Saur. ISBN 978-3-598-11492-2.
- Klaus, Ulrich J. Deutsche Tonfilme: Jahrgang 1935. Klaus-Archiv, 1988.
