= Martin Punitzer =

German architect

Martin Punitzer (7 July 1889 in Berlin – 7 October 1949 in Santiago de Chile aged 60, complete name: Martin Albrecht Punitzer) was a German architect of the New Objectivity, who worked in Berlin in the 1920s. In the 1930s, he was persecuted as a Jew by the Nazis and had to emigrate to Chile.

== Realisations ==
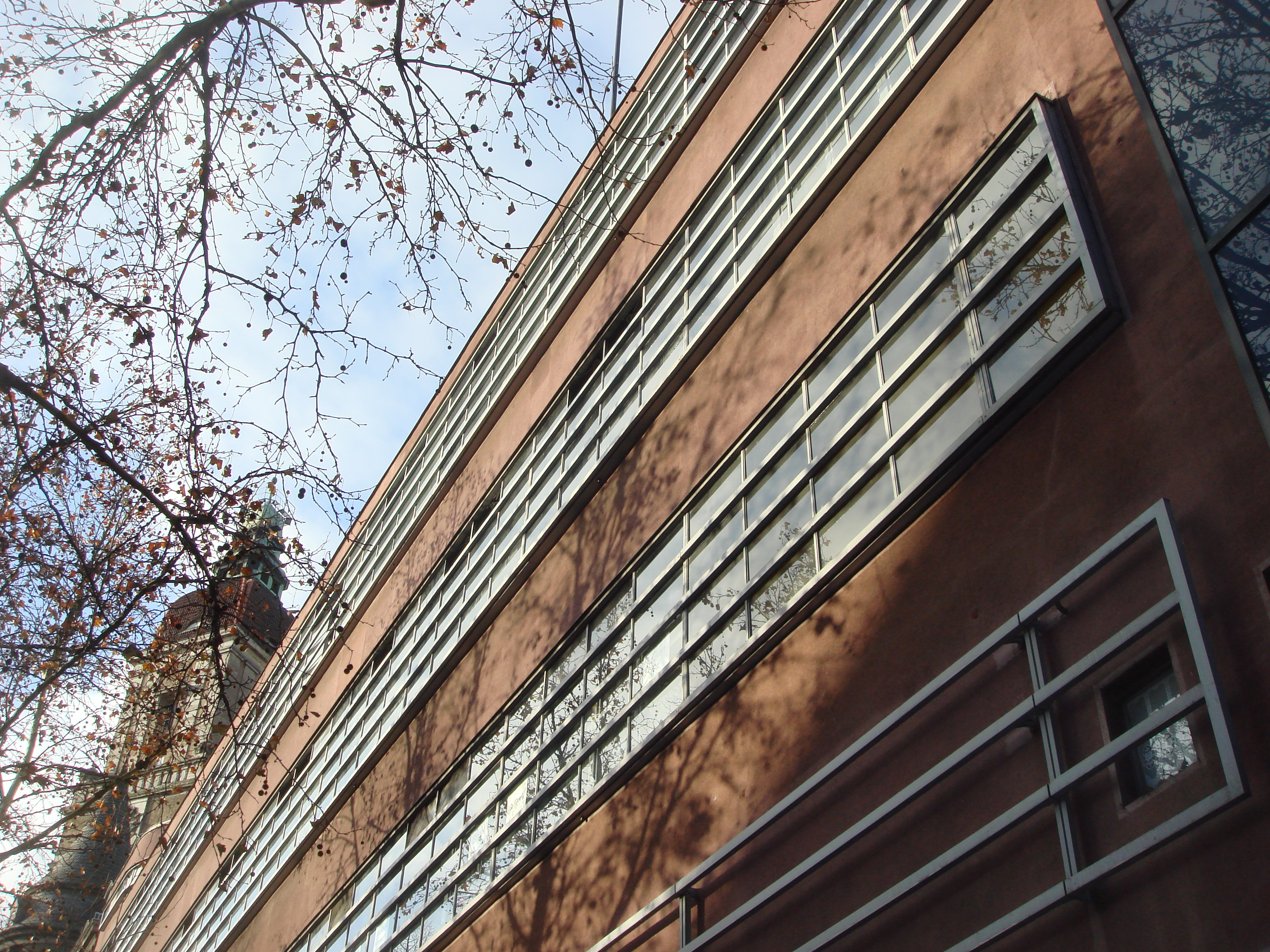
Front side of the Roxy-Palast in Berlin-Friedenau

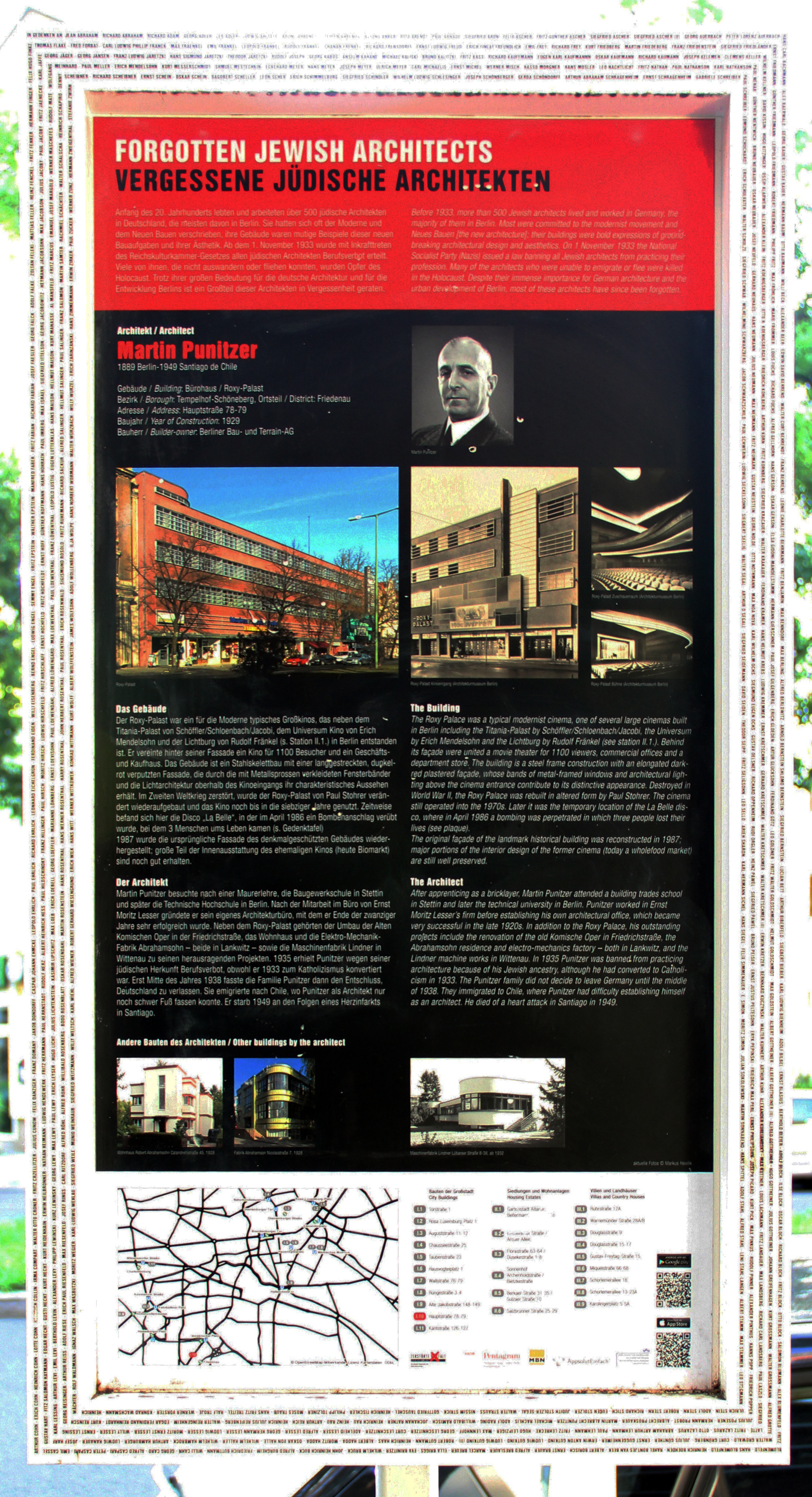
Gedenktafel, Hauptstraße 78 in Berlin-Friedenau

- 1923/1924: Villa Schönbach, Württembergallee 31 in Berlin-Westend
- 1924: Umgestaltung seines Elternhauses, des Eckhauses Turmstraße 76 / Ottostraße 21 in Berlin-Moabit
- 1928/1929: Fabrikgebäude der Robert Abrahamsohn GmbH (later Elektro-Mechanik), Nicolaistraße 7 in Berlin-Lankwitz
- 1928/1929: Wohnhaus für den Unternehmer Robert Abrahamsohn, Calandrellistraße 45 in Berlin-Lankwitz
- 1928/1929: Roxy-Palast, Hauptstraße 78/79 in Berlin-Friedenau
- 1932: Fabrikanlage der Werkzeugmaschinenfabrik Herbert Lindner, Lübarser Straße in Berlin-Wittenau
- 1932: Fabrikgebäude der Hellas Zigarettenfabrik for Evangelos Papastratos, Gerichtstraße 27 in Berlin-Wedding
- 1935/1936: Fabrikgebäude der Maschinenfabrik M. E. Queitzsch KG, Oranienburger Straße 170 und 172 in Berlin-Wittenau
