= Hans Gregor =

German conductor (1866–1945)

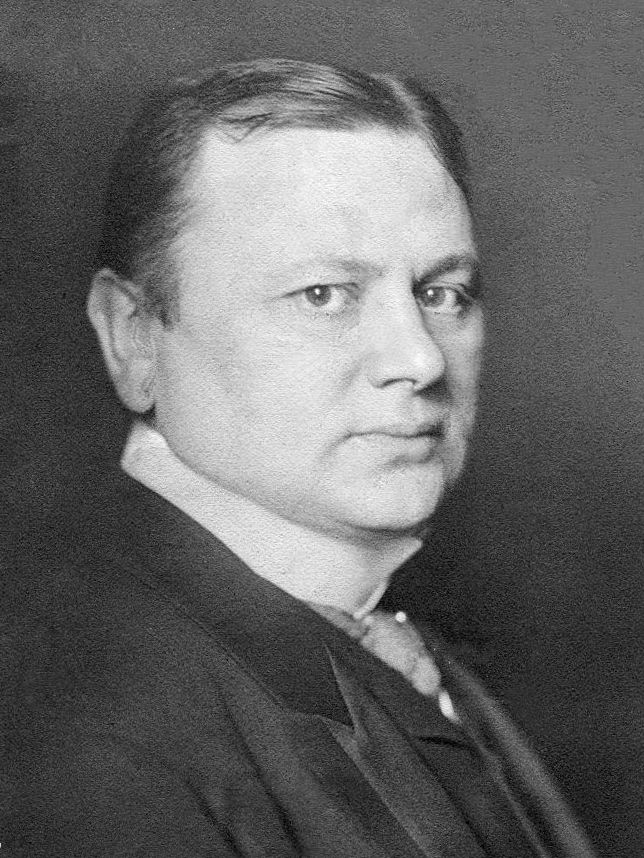
Hans Gregor c. 1906

Hans Gregor (14 April 1866, in Dresden – 13 August 1945, in Wernigerode) was a German actor and arts administrator.

Gregor directed several German-language theaters, including in Barmen-Elberfeld from 1898 to 1905. In Berlin, he led the Komische Oper as its director from 1905 to 1911. Gregor was noted as initiating the trend in opera productions where the stage director began to assert greater influence compared to the previous dominance of opera singers. In addition, the company provided a more naturalistic style of opera productions. He presided over several notable productions, including 19 premieres.

From 1910 to 1918, he led the Vienna State Opera. There, he presided over such productions as the first Vienna performances of Der Rosenkavalier.

Gregor wrote an autobiographical volume of recollections, Die Welt der Oper – Die Oper der Welt.

== Sources ==
- Kommission für Musikforschung (2006). "Gregor, Hans". Oesterreichisches Musiklexikon. Austrian Academy of Sciences.
