= Arthur Maria Rabenalt =

Austrian film director

- Born: 25 June 1905; Vienna, Austria-Hungary (now Austria)
- Died: 26 February 1993 (aged 87); Kreuth, Germany
- Occupation: Film director
- Years active: 1934–1978

Arthur Maria Rabenalt (25 June 1905 – 26 February 1993) was an Austrian film director, writer, and author. He directed more than 90 films between 1934 and 1978. His 1958 film That Won't Keep a Sailor Down was entered into the 1st Moscow International Film Festival. Two years later, his 1960 film Big Request Concert was entered into the 2nd Moscow International Film Festival. His career encompassed both Nazi cinema and West German productions. He also wrote several books on the 1930s and 1940s wave of German cinema.

== Career ==
In his early teens, Rabenalt began his stage career directing operas at theatres in Darmstadt, Berlin and Gera. From then on to the mid-1920s he worked (though uncredited) as a production assistant on several films such including G. W. Pabst's Joyless Street (1925). After Nazi's rise to power, Rabenalt made his feature film debut directing the musical comedy, What Am I Without You (1934), which was then shortly followed with the release of the comedy Pappi (1934). He continued to work in different genres, including The Love of the Maharaja (1936), and Men Are That Way and Midsummer Night's Fire which were released in 1939.

Throughout the 1940s, Rabaenalt worked with melodramatic dramas and comedy. Some of his early films in the 1940s, such as Riding for Germany, supported Nazi ideology. In 1989, he said "I had only made circus films and chamber-type entertainment films since 1941. The only Nazi film I knew was ... rides for Germany (1941), and it was admired. The first films of mine that were distributed again after the war were Circus Renz (1943) and Regimental Music (shot in 1944 under the title The Guilty of Gabriele Rottweil, the film only came to the cinemas in 1950). The controversy about ... rides for Germany came much later.

After the war he resumed his stage career as a director, beginning with the East German production, Chemistry and Love (1948), satire on anti-capitalism based on a play by Bela Balasz. He continued to work on productions for East German state studio DEFA until 1948. In the 1950s, he moved into more mainstream entertainment, including the Weimar horror remake of Alraune (1952), which starred Hildegard Knef and Erich von Stroheim.

From 1960, Rabanalt worked only in television, adapting classic comedies and operettas for a mainstream audience. He also wrote several erotic pulp fiction books as well as memoirs and factual books about Nazi Germany.

== Selected filmography ==
- What Am I Without You (1934)
- Pappi (1934)
- The Love of the Maharaja (1936)
- Men Are That Way (1939)
- Escape in the Dark (1939)
- Midsummer Night's Fire (1939)
- The Three Codonas (1940)
- Achtung! Feind hört mit! (1940), i.e. Attention! The enemy is listening!, Nazi propaganda film
- Riding for Germany (1941), Antisemitic propaganda film
- Front Theatre (1942), i.e. Front theatre
- Circus Renz (1943)
- Love Premiere (1943)
- Life Calls (1944)
- Chemistry and Love (1948)
- Everything Will Be Better in the Morning (1948)
- Martina (1949)
- Nights on the Nile (1949)
- The Woman from Last Night (1950)
- Regimental Music (1950)
- Immortal Light (1951)
- Wedding in the Hay (1951)
- The White Adventure (1952)
- The Forester's Daughter (1952)
- We're Dancing on the Rainbow (1952)
- Alraune (1952)
- The Mistress of Treves (1952)
- The Immortal Vagabond (1953)
- Lavender (1953)
- The Last Waltz (1953)
- The Bird Seller (1953)
- The Little Czar (1954)
- The Gypsy Baron (1954)
- Operation Sleeping Bag (1955)
- As Long as There Are Pretty Girls (1955)
- Love Is Just a Fairytale (1955)
- Between Time and Eternity (1956)
- The Marriage of Doctor Danwitz (1956)
- Skandal um Dr. Vlimmen (1956)
- Spring in Berlin (1957)
- That Won't Keep a Sailor Down (1958)
- A Woman Who Knows What She Wants (1958)
- Arena of Fear (1959)
- What a Woman Dreams of in Springtime (1959)
- Big Request Concert (1960)
- Man in the Shadows (1961)

== Published books ==
- Tanz and Film (1960)
- Das Theater der Lust (1982)
- Theater ohne Tabu (Emsdetten, 1970)
- Der Operetten-Bildband Bühne Film Fernsehen (1980)
- Mimus eroticus (Hamburg, 1965/67)
- Joseph Goebbels und der Grossdeutsche Film (Munich, 1985)
- Gesammelte Schriften (Hildesheim, 1999)
