= Bruno Fritz =

German actor

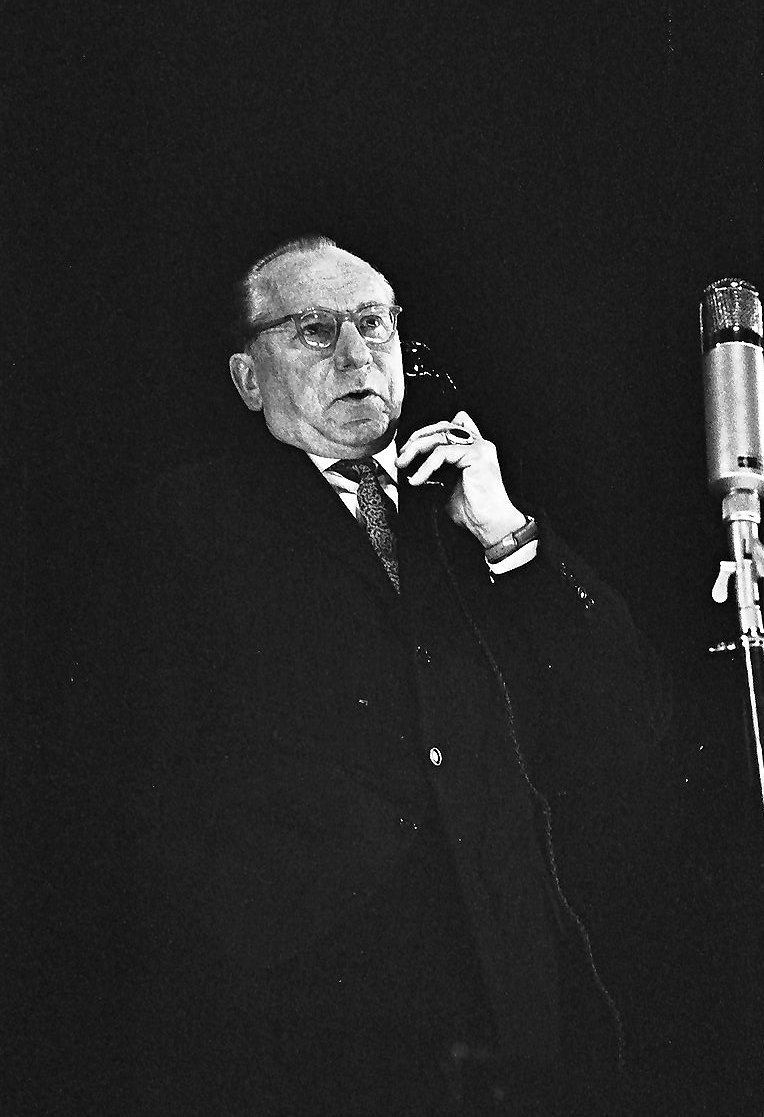
- Fritz in 1959
- Born: 4 March 1900; Berlin, German Empire
- Died: 12 June 1984 (aged 84); West Berlin, West Germany
- Occupation: Actor
- Years active: 1934–1971

Bruno Fritz (4 March 1900 – 12 June 1984) was a German actor. He appeared in more than sixty films from 1934 to 1971.

== Filmography ==
Year	Title	Role	Notes
1935	Glückspilze	Conférencier	
1935	Sergeant Schwenke	Ein Stammgast	
1936	The Dreamer	Obersekretär Tamaschke	
1936	Der müde Theodor	Fritz Findeisen	
1936	Auf großer Fahrt	Narrator	
1938	The Mystery of Betty Bonn	Reeder Winchester	
1938	The Roundabouts of Handsome Karl	Herr mit Jägerhut (Klaus: Privatdetektiv)	
1939	The Leghorn Hat	Leierkastenmann	
1939	Police Report	Müller, Kriminalsekretär	
1939	Hurrah! I'm a Father	Chauffeur Willi	
1939	Sommer, Sonne, Erika	Betrüger Herbert Specht	
1941	Frau Luna	Milke	Uncredited
1950	The Reluctant Maharaja	Arthur - Tankwart	
1950	The Woman from Last Night		
1950	Mädchen mit Beziehungen	Stahl	
1950	Herrliche Zeiten	Self	
1951	You Have to be Beautiful	Regisseur Treff	
1951	Engel im Abendkleid		
1952	Stips	Felix Sommer, Verleger	
1952	Three Days of Fear	Krause - Hehler	
1952	Pension Schöller	Zarini, Artist	
1952	Mikosch Comes In	Major von Itzenblitz	
1953	Josef the Chaste	Generaldirektor Bruckmann	
1953	Not Afraid of Big Animals	Herr Richter	
1953	So ein Affentheater		
1953	Heimlich, still und leise		
1955	The Captain and His Hero	Hauptfeldwebel Krenke	
1955	I Was an Ugly Girl	Alexander Howald, Vater von Anneliese	
1956	Lügen haben hübsche Beine	Wuttke	
1957	Hoch droben auf dem Berg	Plauert	
1957	The Big Chance	Fabrikant Otto Hallersperg	
1958	Naked in the Night		
1958	Solang' noch Unter'n Linden	Robert Steidl / Self	
1958	Das verbotene Paradies	Max Dettmann	
1958	Der eiserne Gustav	Amtsarzt	
1959	That's No Way to Land a Man	Wilhelm Böckelmann	
1961	Davon träumen alle Mädchen	Generaldirektor Brennicke	
1961	The Dream of Lieschen Mueller	Bankdirektor Mayer	
1962	Café Oriental	Papa Bröseke	
1962	Escape from East Berlin	Uncle Albrecht	
1967	Rheinsberg		
1969	The Sorrow and the Pity		(archival footage)
