= The Man in the Saddle (1925 film) =

1925 film

- Directed by: Manfred Noa
- Written by: Margarete-Maria Langen; Werner Scheff (novel); Hans Steinhoff
- Produced by: Paul Ebner; Maxim Galitzenstein
- Cinematography: Ewald Daub; Otto Tober
- Production company: Maxim-Film
- Distributed by: UFA
- Release date: 22 December 1925
- Country: Germany
- Languages: Silent; German intertitles

The Man in the Saddle (German:Der Mann im Sattel) is a 1925 German silent film directed by Manfred Noa. It was remade as a sound film of the same title starring Harry Piel.

The film's sets were designed by Artur Günther.

== Cast ==
In alphabetical order

- Colette Darfeuil
- Wilhelm Diegelmann
- Angelo Ferrari
- Paul Graetz as Manager
- Harry Hardt
- Francine Mussey
- Heinrich Peer
- F.W. Schröder-Schrom
- Ernő Verebes as Mann im Sattel
- Kurt Wolowsky

== See also ==
- List of films about horses

== Bibliography ==
- Bock, Hans-Michael & Bergfelder, Tim. The Concise CineGraph. Encyclopedia of German Cinema. Berghahn Books, 2009.
