= Sonja Ziemann =

German actress (1926–2020)

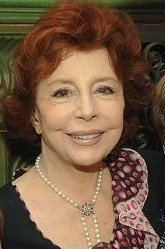
- Ziemann in 2006
- Born: 8 February 1926; Eichwalde, Germany
- Died: 17 February 2020 (aged 94); Munich, Germany
- Occupation: Film actress
- Spouses: Rudolf Hambach (m. 1952; div. 1956) Marek Hłasko (m. 1962; div. 1969) Charles Régnier (m. 1972; died 2001)
- Children: 1
- Awards: Bambi

Sonja Alice Selma Toni Ziemann (German: [ˈzɔnja ˈtsiːman]; 8 February 1926 – 17 February 2020) was a German film and television actress. In the 1950s, she was among Germany's most prominent actresses, awarded the 1950 Bambi for appearing, together with Rudolf Prack, in Schwarzwaldmädel. From the 1960s, she turned to more serious acting in international films such as The Secret Ways. She played in several anti-war films such as Strafbataillon 999. She also appeared on stage and in television.

== Career ==
Ziemann took dance education with Tatjana Gsovsky. Beginning in 1941, she performed in operettas and revues. After World War II, her performances primarily came at the Metropol Theater in Berlin. Ziemann began working in films when she was 15, and by age 18 "was a star of the first magnitude". She was a notable German film star in the 1950s, particularly in the Heimatfilm genre. She formed a screen couple with actor Rudolf Prack in a number of films, including Schwarzwaldmädel (The Black Forest Girl) in 1950. The light-hearted film was welcome in a country conscious of common guilt. It earned her the Bambi for the most popular actress that year. Ziemann and Prack played together again in Grün ist die Heide (The Heath Is Green) in 1951, attracting over 16 million people to the cinema. She also played with partners such as Karlheinz Böhm, O. W. Fischer, Gert Fröbe, Johannes Heesters, Curd Jürgens and Hardy Krüger.

In retrospect, she described the roles of sweet country girl as kitsch. Her first character role came in 1958 in the Polish social drama The Eighth Day of the Week. Her popularity in Germany dropped considerably after the film. She was the first German actor to star in an international production, the 1961 spy drama The Secret Ways (Geheime Wege, 1961), her first American film. She appeared in The Bridge at Remagen in 1969.

In 1962, Ziemann returned to the stage, portraying Eliza Doolittle in productions of My Fair Lady in Zurich and Munich. She also appeared as Wedekind's Lulu. With Götz George, she played in works by Tennessee Williams and toured the world.

== Personal life ==
With her first husband, the industrialist Rudolf Hambach, Ziemann had a son named Pierre who died in 1970 at age 16 from cancer. In 1961, Ziemann married Polish novelist Marek Hłasko. He died in 1969. From 1989 until his death in 2001, she was married to her acting colleague Charles Régnier. Ziemann died on 17 February 2020 at the age of 94.

== Filmography ==
Films with Ziemann include:

- A Gust of Wind (1942) – Gina Galassi
- Die Jungfern vom Bischofsberg (1943)
- Beloved Darling (1943) – Lette Eilers
- Dog Days (1944) – Marion Seidel
- Eine kleine Sommermelodie (1944) – Helga Gutentag
- Freunde (1945) – Vilma
- Tell the Truth (1946) – Lisa (friend)
- Allez Hopp (1946) – Patsy
- King of Hearts (1947) – Dagmar Mauritius
- Ghost in the Castle (1947) – Bianca
- Liebe nach Noten (1947) – Mimi, Barner's niece
- Thank You, I'm Fine (1948) – Irmgard Holk
- Paths in Twilight (1948) – Lissy Stenzel
- Nothing But Coincidence (1949) – Gerti Danzer
- My Wife's Friends (1949) – Fee Freiberg – Kabarettist
- Nights on the Nile (1949) – Susanne
- By a Nose (1949) – Anni Klingebeil
- After the Rain Comes Sunshine (1949) – Sabine
- The Black Forest Girl (1950) – Bärbele Riederle
- The Reluctant Maharaja (1950) – Brigitte Brummer
- One Night Apart (1950) – Käthe
- The Merry Wives of Windsor (1950) – Frau Fluth
- You Have to be Beautiful (1951) – Maria Schippe
- Die Frauen des Herrn S. (1951) – Euritrite
- Johannes und die 13 Schönheitsköniginnen (1951) – Wally, cigarette seller
- The Heath Is Green (1951) – Helga
- The Thief of Bagdad (1952) – Fatme, die Diebin von Bagdad
- I Can't Marry Them All (1952) – Dschidschi
- Made in Heaven (1952) – Marta
- At the Well in Front of the Gate (1952) – Inge Bachner
- Dutch Girl (1953) – Antje
- Christina (1953)
- Life Begins at Seventeen (1953) – Madelien de Jeu
- The Private Secretary (1953) – Gerda Weber
- It Was Always So Nice With You (1954) – Ballet dancer
- My Sister and I (1954) – Christine
- The Seven Dresses of Katrin (1954) – Katrin Burian
- The Big Star Parade (1954) – Sonja Ziemann
- The Little Czar (1954) – Sonja / Sonja Ilyanova
- Love Without Illusions (1955) – Ursula
- I Was an Ugly Girl (1955) – Anneliese Howald
- A Girl Without Boundaries (1955) – Helga Gruber
- The Bath in the Barn (1956) – Antje, the mayor's wife
- Dany, bitte schreiben Sie (1956) – Daniela 'Dany' Ruland
- Opera Ball (1956) – Helene Hollinger, Hollinger's wife
- Emperor's Ball (1956) – Franzi
- Nichts als Ärger mit der Liebe (1956)
- Supreme Confession (1956) – Giovanna
- The Zurich Engagement (1957) – Sonja Ziemann
- Spring in Berlin (1957) – Nicoline
- Doctor Bertram (1957) – Nelly
- The Italians They Are Crazy (1958)
- Tabarin (1958) – Rosine Forestier
- The Eighth Day of the Week (1958) – Agnieszka Walicka
- Serenade of Texas (1958) – Sylvia
- Stalingrad: Dogs, Do You Want to Live Forever? (1959) – Katja
- Liebe auf krummen Beinen (1959) – Eva
- Menschen im Hotel (1959) – Flämmchen
- Rebel Flight to Cuba (1959) – Carka
- Strafbataillon 999 (1960) – Julia Deutschmann
- Darkness Fell on Gotenhafen (1960) – Maria Reiser
- The Nabob Affair (1960) – La milliardaire
- The Secret Ways (1961) – Julia
- ... denn das Weib ist schwach (1961) – Hanna Schäferkamp
- A Matter of WHO (1961) – Michele
- The Dream of Lieschen Mueller (1961) – Lieschen Müller
- Her Most Beautiful Day (1962) – Helen
- Journey Into Nowhere (1962) – Maria
- Axel Munthe, The Doctor of San Michele (1962) – Prinzessin Clementine
- Frühstück mit dem Tod (1964) – Lawyer Jane Painter-Talbot
- Halløj i himmelsengen (1965) – Margot
- The Bridge at Remagen (1969) – Greta Holzgang
- De Sade (1969) – La Beauvoisin
- Das Messer (1971, TV Mini-Series) – Mrs. Corby
- Parkhotel Stern: Das Idol (2001, TV series episode) (final film role)
