= Werner Scheff =

- Born: 5 May 1888; Berlin, German Empire
- Died: 1947 (aged 58–59); London, United Kingdom
- Occupation: Writer
- Relatives: Otto Scheff (brother)

Werner Scheff (1888–1947) was a German novelist and screenwriter. He was known as a prolific writer of sports fiction. Following the Nazi Party's rise to power, he emigrated and died in London in 1947.

== Selected filmography ==
- Die Arche (1919)
- The Man in the Saddle (1925)
- Dagfin (1926)
- The Girl on a Swing (1926)
- The Champion of the World (1927)
- Attorney for the Heart (1927)
- The Prisoners of Shanghai (1927)
- Never Trust a Woman (1930)
- Johnny Steals Europe (1932)
- Ship Without a Harbour (1932)
- Secret Agent (1932)
- The Marathon Runner (1933)
- Jumping Into the Abyss (1933)

== Bibliography ==
- Erik N. Jensen. Body by Weimar: Athletes, Gender, and German Modernity. Oxford University Press, 2010.
