= August Neidhart =

Austrian writer and librettist

August Neidhart (12 May 1867 in Vienna, Kaisertum Österreich – 25 November 1934 in Berlin) was an Austrian writer and librettist.

Neidhart was an author of folk plays and operettas. His earlier works included the Schwank Das Protektionskind (by Alexander Engel and August Neidhart). He achieved a worldwide success as a librettist for Leon Jessel's operetta Schwarzwaldmädel (Alte Komische Oper Berlin, 25 August 1917).

== Operettas ==
- Der Triumph des Weibes, 1906; music by Joseph Hellmesberger Jr.
- Belagerungszustand, 1909; music by Leo Ascher
- Der junge Papa, 1909 (with Alexander Engel); music by Edmund Eysler
- Sein Herzensjunge, 1911 (with Rudolph Schanzer); music by Walter Kollo
- Schwarzwaldmädel, 1917; music by Leon Jessel
- Ein modernes Mädel, 1918; music by Leon Jessel
- Das Dorf ohne Glocke, 1919; music by Eduard Künneke
- Baroneßchen Sarah, 1920; music by Leo Ascher
- Die Strohwitwe, 1920; music by Leo Blech
- Die Postmeisterin, 1921; music by Leon Jessel
- Die Straßensängerin, 1922; music by Leo Fall
- Ninon am Scheideweg, 1926; music by Leo Ascher
- Die Luxuskabine, 1929; music by Leon Jessel
- Junger Wein, 1933; music by Leon Jessel
