= Leon Jessel =

German composer (1871–1942)

- Jessel c. 1907
- Born: January 22, 1871; Stettin, Germany (now Szczecin, Poland)
- Died: January 4, 1942 (aged 70); Berlin, Germany
- Other name: Léon Jessel
- Occupation: Composer
- Known for: The Parade of the Tin Soldiers; Schwarzwaldmädel

Leon Jessel, or Léon Jessel (22 January 1871 – 4 January 1942), was a German composer of operettas and light classical music pieces. Today he is best known internationally as the composer of the popular jaunty march The Parade of the Tin Soldiers, also known as The Parade of the Wooden Soldiers. Jessel was a prolific composer who wrote hundreds of light orchestral pieces, piano pieces, songs, waltzes, mazurkas, marches, choruses, and other salon music. He achieved considerable acclaim with a number of his operettas — in particular Schwarzwaldmädel (Black Forest Girl), which remains popular to this day.

Because Jessel was a Jew by birth (he converted to Christianity at the age of 23), with the rise of Nazism in the late 1920s, his composing virtually came to an end, and his musical works, which had been very popular, were suppressed and nearly forgotten.

== Early life and family ==
Leon Jessel was born in the eastern German city of Stettin (now Szczecin, Poland), in 1871, the son of Jewish merchant Samuel Jessel and his American wife Mary. Leon converted to Christianity in 1894 — the same year he premiered his first operetta Die Brautwerbung (The Courtship) — in order to marry Clara Louise Grunewald, and they were wed in 1896. In 1909 his daughter Maria Eva was born, and in 1911 the family moved to Berlin. In 1919, his first marriage ended in divorce. In 1921 he married his second wife, Anna Gerholdt, who was 19 years his junior.

== Career| ==
Although his musical parents wanted him to become a merchant or businessman, Jessel was instead drawn to becoming a musician, and left school at the age of 17 to pursue music and musical theater. After studying with various teachers between 1888 and 1891, Jessel became a conductor, music director, chorus master, bandmaster, and theater conductor working in many German cities.

Beginning in 1892, these jobs included the position of Kapellmeister in cities which included Mülheim an der Ruhr, Freiberg, Kiel, Stettin, Chemnitz, and Neustrelitz. He finally settled in Lübeck, where he was Kapellmeister at the Wilhelm Theater from 1899 to 1905, whereupon he became director of the Lübeck Liedertafel (men's singing group) association. While in Lübeck, Jessel composed numerous choral works, operettas, and character pieces.

In 1911, Jessel moved to Berlin, where he came into his own and made a name for himself — his 1913 operetta Die beiden Husaren (The Two Hussars) garnered much attention. He continued to compose many operettas and Singspiel operas, most of which premiered in Berlin. In 1915, Jessel also co-founded and co-launched the early GEMA, a German performance rights organization.

Jessel's biggest success was the operetta Schwarzwaldmädel (Black Forest Girl), which premiered at the Alte Komische Oper Berlin in Berlin in August 1917. The opera's touching libretto, appealing melodies, and elegant instrumentation proved immensely popular, and it ran in Berlin for 900 performances, and within the next 10 years was performed approximately 6,000 times in Germany and abroad. Schwarzwaldmädel has been recorded numerous times over many decades, in addition to also being filmed and televised numerous times. Jessel also had a major success with his 1921 operetta Die Postmeisterin (The Postmistress), and in total he wrote nearly two dozen operettas.

== Persecution and death in Nazi Germany ==
Jessel's operettas were popular, nationalistic, and very German: Schwarzwaldmädel was a favorite of Hitler and Himmler. Because of this, and because of his own conservative nationalistic ideology, and because his second wife Anna joined the Nazi party in 1932, Jessel expected acceptance in Germany even during and after the Nazi rise to power. Instead, he was rejected by the Nazi leadership because of his Jewish descent, even though he had converted to Christianity in 1894, and performances of his works were banned in 1933. Jessel's last major work was his 1933 operetta Junger Wein (Young Wine), and his biographer Albrecht Dümling believes that he was a victim of targeted boycott measures as early as 1927.

In 1937, he was forced out of the Reichsmusikkammer (the State Music Institute), and recordings and distribution of his works were prohibited. In 1941, a house search turned up a 1939 letter to his librettist William Sterk in Vienna, in which Jessel had written: "I cannot work in a time when hatred of Jews threatens my people with destruction, where I do not know when that gruesome fate will likewise be knocking at my door." On 15 December 1941 Jessel was arrested and delivered to the Gestapo in Berlin. He was tortured by the Gestapo in a basement of the Police Bureau at Alexanderplatz and subsequently died on 4 January 1942 in the Berlin Jewish Hospital. He was 70.

== Legacy ==
=== The Parade of the Tin Soldiers ===
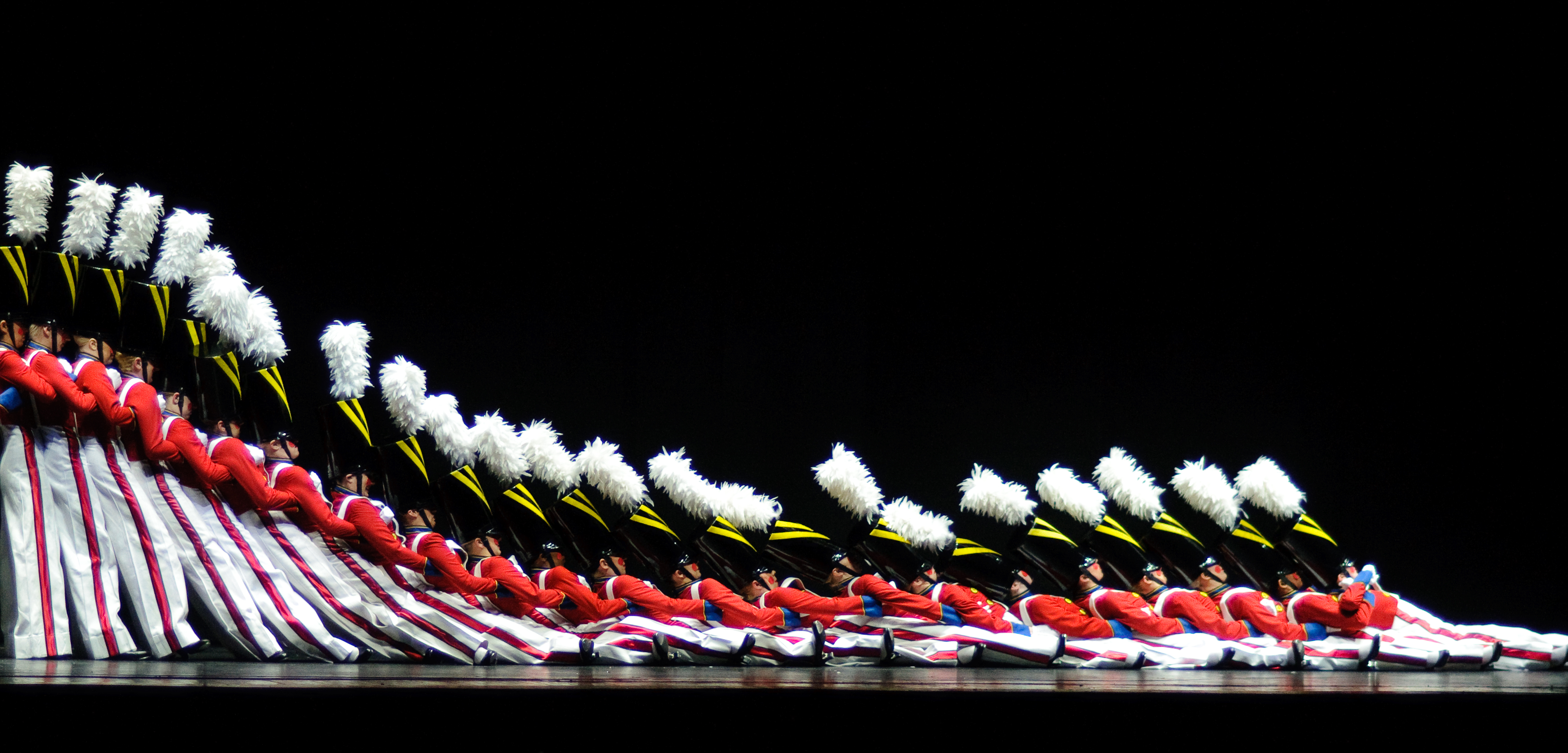
"The Parade of the Wooden Soldiers": The Rockettes in the annual Radio City Christmas Spectacular

One of Jessel's non-operatic pieces still extensively performed and recorded worldwide is the jaunty march (originally for piano) for orchestra or military band entitled The Parade of the Tin Soldiers (Die Parade der Zinnsoldaten).

The Parade of the Tin Soldiers was popularized internationally in the early 1920s, under the title The Parade of the Wooden Soldiers, by Nikita Balieff in his La Chauve-Souris vaudeville show. In 1923, Lee DeForest filmed The Parade of the Wooden Soldiers, performed by Balieff's company, in the DeForest Phonofilm sound-on-film process. The film premiered that year in New York City, and is in the Maurice Zouary collection at the Library of Congress.

By the mid-1920s, the piece was a hit single recorded by the orchestras of Carl Fenton, Vincent Lopez, and Paul Whiteman. It has been widely performed and recorded ever since. For instance, a Betty Boop film of the same name was created with the music in 1933, and The Rockettes have been performing their own choreographed version of the piece since then in the annual Radio City Christmas Spectacular.

In Great Britain the piece was used for many years in BBC radio's Children's Hour to introduce the series Toytown, based on stories by S. G. Hulme Beaman. The recording used was by the New Light Symphony Orchestra.

=== Schwarzwaldmädel and other works ===
Jessel's charming operetta Schwarzwaldmädel (Black Forest Girl) remains one of the most popular operettas written in Germany, and it has continued to be performed, recorded, filmed, and televised. According to Andrew Lamb in 150 Years of Popular Musical Theatre, "Schwarzwaldmädel represented all that was best in continental operetta."

Several of Jessel's instrumental character pieces, such as "The Wedding of the Rose" (Der Rose Hochzeitszug), are also still in international circulation.

=== Memorial ===
In the Wilmersdorf section of Berlin, a tree-lined plaza, with a "mushroom fountain", surrounded by cafes and restaurants, was renamed Leon-Jessel-Platz in 1986.

== Selected works ==
Stage works

- Die Brautwerbung (The Courtship) (Operetta in 1 Act; Text: Else Gehrke, premiere: 1894, Celle)
- Kruschke am Nordpol (Kruschke at the North Pole) (Operetta in 1 Act; Text: Max Reichardt, premiere: 1896, Kiel)
- Die beiden Husaren (The Two Hussars) (Operetta; Text: Wilhelm Jacoby and Rudolf Schanzer, premiere: 6 February 1913, Theater des Westens, Berlin)
- Wer zuletzt lacht (Who Laughs Last) (Musical comedy; Text: Arthur Lippschitz and Albert Bernstein-Sawersky, premiere: 31 December 1913, Theater an der Weidendammer Brücke, Berlin)
- Schwarzwaldmädel (Black Forest Girl), (Operetta; Text: August Neidhart, premiere: 25 August 1917, Alte Komische Oper Berlin, Berlin)
- Ein modernes Mädel (A Modern Girl) (Operetta; Text: August Neidhart, premiere: 28 June 1918, Volkstheater, Munich)
- Ohne Männer kein Vergnügen (No Pleasure Without Men) (Dance Operetta; Text: August Neidhart, premiere: 1918, Berlin)
- Die närrische Liebe (The Foolish Love) (Singspiel; Text: Jean Kren, premiere: 1919, Berlin)
- Verliebte Frauen (Women in Love) (Vaudeville; Text: Alexander Pordes-Milo, premiere: 1920, Königsberg)
- Schwalbenhochzeit (The Swallows' Wedding) (Operetta; Text: Alexander Pordes-Milo, premiere: 28 January 1921, Theater des Westens, Berlin)
- Die Postmeisterin (The Postmistress) (Operetta; Text: August Neidhart, premiere: 3 February 1921, Central-Theater, Berlin)
- Das Detektivmädel (The Girl Detective) (Operetta; Text: August Neidhart, premiere: 1921, Berlin)
- Des Königs Nachbarin (The King's Lovely Neighbor) (Singspiel; Text: Fritz Grünbaum and Wilhelm Sterk, premiere: 15 April 1923, Wallner-Theater, Berlin)
- Der keusche Benjamin (Chaste Benjamin) (Operetta; Text: Max Steiner-Kaiser and Hans Bodenstedt, premiere: 1923 Hamburg)
- Meine Tochter Otto (My Daughter Otto) (Operetta; Text: Fritz Grünbaum and Wilhelm Sterk, premiere: 1924, Berlin)
- Prinzessin Husch (Princess Husch) (Operetta; Text: August Neidhart, premiere: 1925, Hamburg)
- Die kleine Studentin (The College Girl) (Operetta; Text: Leo Kastner and Alfred Möller, premiere: 1926, Stettin)
- Mädels, die man liebt (Girls You Love) (Musical; Text: Leo Kastner and Alfred Möller, premiere: 1927, Hamburg)
- Die Luxuskabine (The Luxurious Cabin) (Operetta; Text: August Neidhart, premiere: 1929, Leipzig)
- Junger Wein (Young Wine) (Operetta; Text: August Neidhart, premiere: 1 September 1933, Theater des Westens, Berlin)
- Die goldene Mühle (The Golden Mill) (Singspiel; Text: Wilhelm Sterk, performed incomplete: 29 October 1936, Olten, Switzerland)
- Treffpunkt Tegernsee (Lake Tegernsee Meeting Place) (Operetta; Text: Aksel Lund and Erik Radolf, premiere: April 12, 2009, Stadttheater in Neuburg an der Donau by Neuburger Volkstheater)

Instrumental

- Die Parade der Zinnsoldaten (The Parade of the Tin Soldiers aka The Parade of the Wooden Soldiers) (Character piece, solo piano. Sold in 1897; published for orchestra in 1905, Opus 123)
- Der Rose Hochzeitszug ("The Wedding of the Rose") (Character piece / Two-Step for piano or orchestra. Written: 1905, Opus 216)
- Die Marokkanische Patrouille ("The Moroccan Patrol") (Character piece for solo piano, duet, piano & violin, or orchestra. Published 1911, Opus 227.)
