= Bundle of Joy =

1956 film directed by Norman Taurog

- Theatrical release poster
- Directed by: Norman Taurog
- Screenplay by: Robert Carson; Norman Krasna; Arthur Sheekman
- Story by: Felix Jackson
- Produced by: Edmund Grainger
- Starring: Eddie Fisher; Debbie Reynolds; Adolphe Menjou
- Cinematography: William E. Snyder
- Edited by: Harry Marker
- Music by: Hugo Winterhalter; Walter Scharf
- Production company: Edmund Grainger Productions
- Distributed by: RKO Radio Pictures
- Release date: December 12, 1956 (US)
- Running time: 98 minutes
- Country: United States
- Language: English

Bundle of Joy is a 1956 American Technicolor musical film directed by Norman Taurog and starring Eddie Fisher, Debbie Reynolds (who were married in real life at the time) and Adolphe Menjou. It is a remake of the 1939 comedy film Bachelor Mother, which starred Ginger Rogers and David Niven, and was itself an English remake of the 1935 Austrian-Hungarian comedy film Little Mother.

Produced by Edmund Grainger, it was distributed by RKO Pictures. An unmarried salesgirl at a department store finds and takes care of an abandoned baby. Much confusion results when her co-workers assume the child is hers and that the father is the son of the store owner.

== Plot ==
Polly Parish works in the Millinery Department at J.B. Merlin & Son's department store on the Upper East Side of Manhattan. She is summoned to the office of the store manager, who informs her that she is fired because she is overselling hats, which creates too many returns and too much work for the accounting department. After work, Polly walks home and wonders what she will do to make ends meet.

On a step, she finds an abandoned baby in a blanket and instinctively picks it up to comfort it. As she bends over, the door behind the step opens and a woman ushers Polly and the baby inside. Polly has not noticed the sign that indicates the door belongs to an orphanage. When she denies the baby is hers inside, the staff disbelieve her, having experienced countless women reluctant to admit that they bore a child out of wedlock. Polly explains that she has just lost her job at J.B Merlin & Son's and insists there is no way that she will care for a baby that is not hers.

After she leaves, the head of the orphanage decides to intervene on her behalf, knowing the Merlins to be charitable. He convinces the firm to hire Polly back, and she is summoned to a meeting with Dan Merlin, the son of the eponymous owner. Dan informs her that she will be hired back at $10 more per week and that a gift will be delivered to her apartment later that night. When the baby arrives, Polly is flabbergasted. She convinces a friend to help her deliver the baby back to Dan at his home on East 63rd Street.

They leave the baby in the care of Dan's butler, whom Dan enlists to help him return the baby to Polly. They track her down to a dance hall where she is hoping to win a prize. Dan gets into a scuffle and gets thrown out. So he goes to Polly's apartment and waits for her there with the baby. Forced to care for the baby, Polly makes do and grows fond of him. She names the child John, and Dan checks in on her from time to time.

On New Year's Eve, Dan is stood up by his date, because he had forgotten to call her earlier. He arranges for Polly's landlady to watch John while they go out together. He takes her to the department store to get an outfit for a night out on the town. When he drops her off back at home, he jokes that she is fired so that he can kiss her.

Meanwhile, J.B. Merlin has been misinformed that he is a grandfather, mistaking John to be Dan's son. He begins to make arrangements for Dan to have full custody of the child. Polly panics at the thought of losing John. So she pretends that her landlady's nephew, who is visiting from Harvard, is John's real father. Dan produces a store employee to pretend he is the father. The ensuing confusion leads to a full confession of love from Dan and a happy union for the new family, and J.B. is convinced the boy is his grandson.

== Cast ==
- Eddie Fisher as Dan Merlin
- Debbie Reynolds as Polly Parish
- Adolphe Menjou as J. B. Merlin, Dan's father and Polly's ultimate boss
- Tommy Noonan as Freddie Miller
- Nita Talbot as Mary
- Una Merkel as Mrs. Dugan
- Melville Cooper as Adams
- Gil Stratton as Mike Clancy
- Bill Goodwin as Mr. Creely
- Howard McNear as Mr. Appleby
- Robert H. Harris as Mr. Hargraves
- Mary Treen as Matron
- Edward Brophy as Dance Contest Judge (as Edward S. Brophy)
- Scott Douglas as Bill Rand

== Soundtrack ==
Music by Josef Myrow and lyrics by Mack Gordon;

- Bundle of Joy
- All About Love
- Some Day Soon
- I Never Felt This Way Before
- Worry About Tomorrow
- Lullaby in Blue

== Production ==
=== Development ===
The original narrative of Bundle of Joy was produced by Joe Pasternak who had developed a winning formula in Universal Picture's Berlin division. His second picture with Henry Koster (director), Felix Jackson (writer), and Franciska Gaal (actress) was Kleine Mutti (Little Mother, 1935) about the orphan Marie who raises a foundling and ends up marrying a banker. The German-language film was remade in English as Bachelor Mother three years later. Bundle of Joy is a musical adaptation of Bachelor Mother, and Jackson retains story credit on both pictures.

RKO Studios had ceased production after Howard Hughes sold it. The new owners announced a program of 11 films costing $22,500,000; The First Travelling Saleslady, Back from Eternity, Tension at Table Rock, Beyond a Reasonable Doubt, Stage Struck, Bundle of Joy, A Farewell to Arms, Cash McCall, Misty, The Syndicate and Is This Our Son?. (Not all these films would be made by RKO and several were not made at all.)

=== Filming ===
Filming started in June 1956. It finished in August.

"I know I"m not an actor but I haven't had too much to worry about," said Fisher.

Carrie Fisher tells the story in her memoir and subsequent documentary film Wishful Drinking (2010) that Reynolds was pregnant with her during production of this film as well as Tammy and the Bachelor.

During production, director Norman Taurog was in the early stages of Alzheimer's disease. Very little was known about the illness at the time, so Debbie Reynolds and the rest of the cast and crew "just coped with" his unexplained memory losses and constant repeated instructions.

== Release ==
The movie's premiere was given at the Capitol Theatre in New York on December 19, 1956. The event doubled as a fundraiser for refugees of the Hungarian Revolution, which had ended only a month earlier. George Jessel was the master of ceremonies. Archduke Leopold of Habsburg and his sister were notable guests along with other celebrities and executives of RKO pictures. The event raised $21,000 for CARE and First Aid for Hungary, which was formed on October 29, 1956, in order to "bring aid to the hundreds of Hungarian Freedom Fighters who had been forced to seek refuge in neighboring Austria and had thus cast an enormous burden upon that country".

Eddie Fisher later wrote that he "tried my best to do a good job in" the film. "In fact, both Debbie and I worked so hard that we didn’t even go home during the last few weeks of shooting. We stayed in a bungalow on the lot." When he saw the final cut he said "As bad as I was, the picture was even worse, a bomb... Bundle of Joy laid a financial egg, the dishwater ordinary songs disappeared without a trace and Debbie’s was the only movie career that managed to survive".

Kinematograph Weekly did say the film "did very well" at the British box office.

== See also ==
- List of American films of 1956
