= Bachelor Mother =

1939 film by Garson Kanin

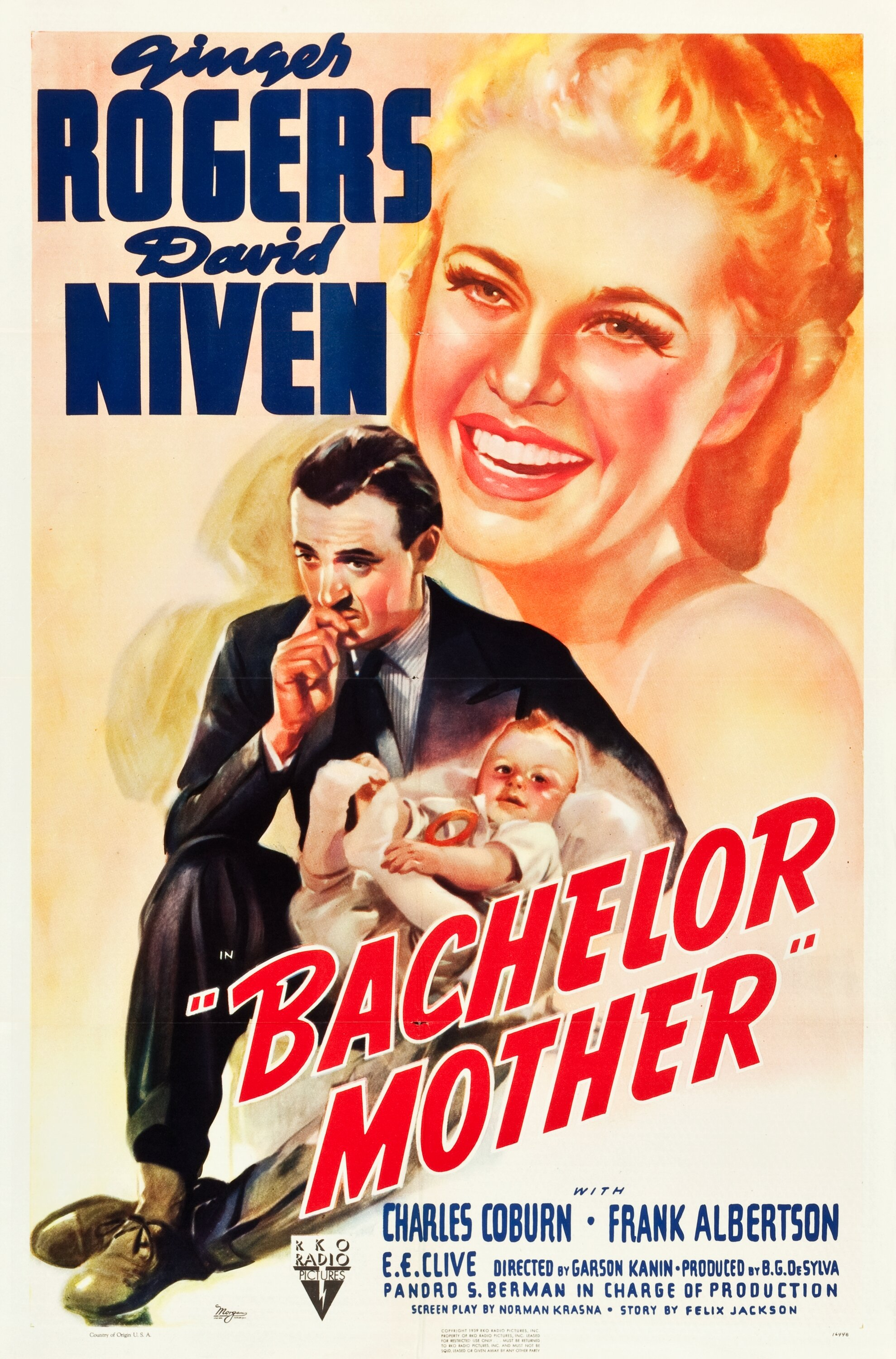
- Theatrical release poster
- Directed by: Garson Kanin
- Screenplay by: Norman Krasna
- Story by: Felix Jackson
- Produced by: Buddy G. DeSylva
- Starring: Ginger Rogers; David Niven; Charles Coburn; Frank Albertson; E. E. Clive
- Cinematography: Robert De Grasse
- Edited by: Henry Berman; Robert Wise
- Music by: Roy Webb
- Production company: RKO Radio Pictures
- Distributed by: RKO Radio Pictures
- Release date: June 30, 1939
- Running time: 82 minutes
- Country: United States
- Language: English
- Budget: $509,000
- Box office: $1,975,000

Bachelor Mother is a 1939 American romantic comedy film directed by Garson Kanin and starring Ginger Rogers, David Niven, and Charles Coburn. The screenplay was written by Norman Krasna from an Academy Award-nominated story by Felix Jackson (a.k.a. Felix Joachimson) written for the 1935 Austrian-Hungarian film Little Mother. With a plot full of mistaken identities, Bachelor Mother is a light-hearted treatment of the otherwise serious issues of child abandonment.

It was remade in 1956 as Bundle of Joy, starring Debbie Reynolds and Eddie Fisher, and inspired the Bollywood film Kunwara Baap.

== Plot ==
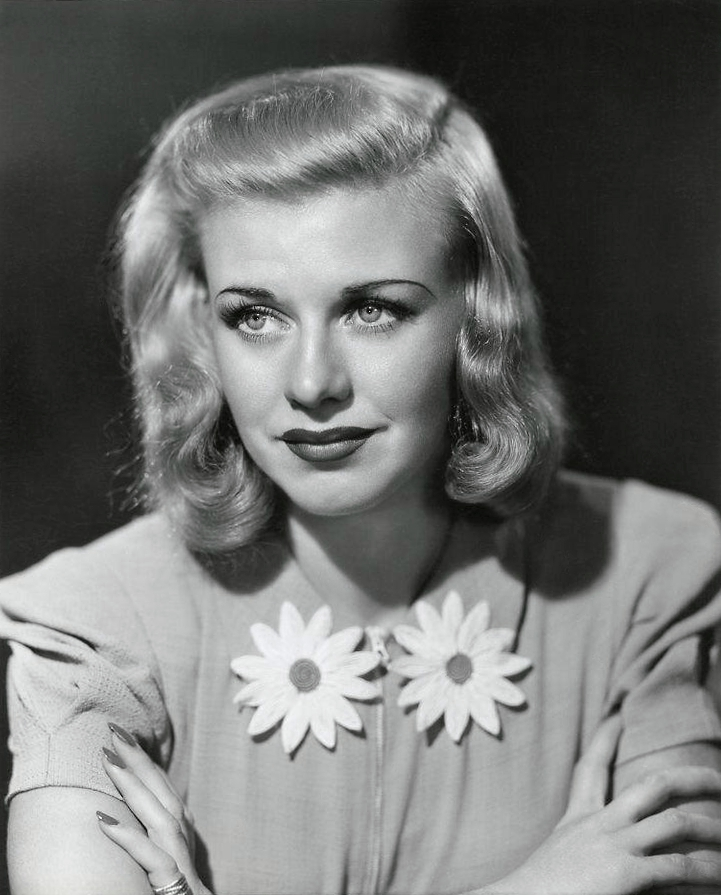
Ginger Rogers plays Polly Parish.

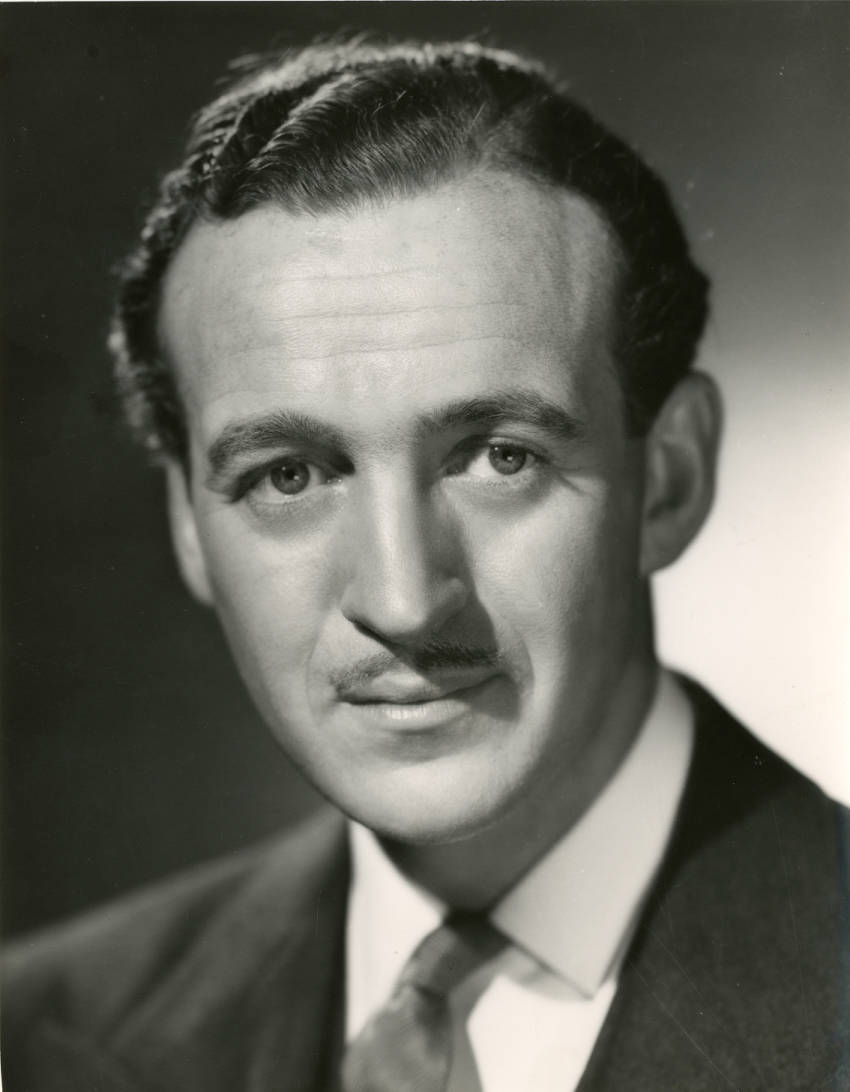
David Niven plays David Merlin.

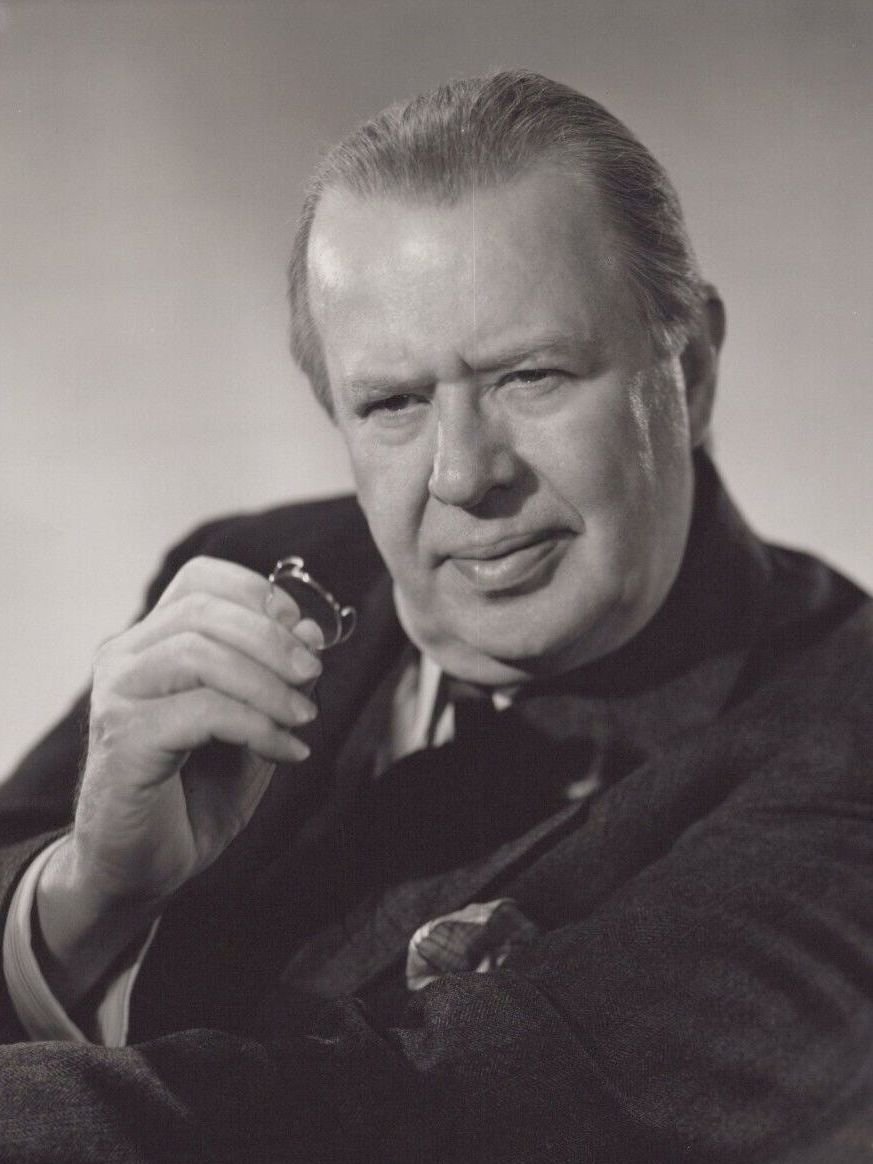
Charles Coburn plays J.B. Merlin.

Polly Parrish, a saleswoman at Merlin's, a New York City department store, receives notice that her seasonal position will be terminated after the Christmas season. Walking to lunch, she sees a woman leaving a baby on the steps of an orphanage. Afraid the baby may roll off the steps, Polly picks it up. Seeing Polly holding the baby, content in her arms, the orphanage staff assumes she is the mother. Despite Polly's disclaiming motherhood, they offer her aid so she can keep the baby. Polly leaves the baby in their care, but not before giving them her name and informing them that she works at Merlin's.

Knowing the Merlin family to be philanthropic, the orphanage director appeals to David, the playboy son of the store's owner, J.B. Merlin, describing Polly's supposed circumstances. David arranges for Polly to have a permanent position and a raise, offering the company's full support. Polly's delight at keeping her job turns to baffled confusion when the orphanage attendants deliver the baby to her home as a condition of her employment.

Frustrated that no one believes the baby is not hers, Polly drops the baby off at David's for his butler to sort out. Desperate for money, Polly departs for a dance competition with a cash prize that she entered with Freddie, a flirtatious stock clerk at the store. An enraged David storms after Polly, baby in tow, believing she abandoned her baby to have fun in nightclubs. David threatens to have Polly blacklisted by every employer in the city if she fails to take care of the child properly.

Threatened with persecution, jobs being scarce in the Depression, Polly gives up, invents an abusive past lover, names the baby "John", and starts raising him. Mrs. Weiss, Polly's landlady, provides baby equipment and offers to care for the boy when Polly is working, and Polly quickly comes to love the child.

David increasingly reaches out to Polly, bringing her and John gifts, advising (feebly) on childcare, and paying visits. Freddie wrongly believes Polly is David's mistress and John their baby. When Freddie is promoted, he mistakenly believes Polly arranged it at his urging; however, Freddie loses this promotion when he confuses David for a shoplifter, attacking him in an overeager show of authority.

New Year's Eve arrives, and David has no date for a high society party. Insisting that Polly deserves an evening out and Mrs. Weiss can care for John, David provides evening clothes and a mink coat from the store. The pair have a romantic evening, though David does not feel ready to commit to a woman with a baby.

Embittered by his lost promotion, Freddie sends an anonymous note to J.B. Merlin, saying that David has a secret child. J.B. is delighted by the idea of a grandchild, having despaired of David's ever settling down. Stalking David, he sees him meet up with Polly and John in a park.

Ironically, David ends up in the same position as Polly: insisting that John is David's baby, J.B. disbelieves any protests to the contrary and demands that he marry Polly. If David refuses, J.B. threatens to seize John's custody through legal means. Rushing to warn Polly, David insists that she produce John's real father to convince J.B. that he is not John's grandfather. Hurt by David's characterizing marrying her as "ridiculous", Polly tells him to leave.

Polly is fearful that J.B.'s bringing in lawyers and investigators will reveal that she is not John’s mother, likely compelling her to give up the child she loves. Mrs. Weiss has her adult son, Jerome, pose as Polly's "secret" husband, ostensibly due to Merlin's Depression-era policy against employment of married women. The ploy fails when David arrives with Freddie, whom he has bribed to pose as John's father. A jealous David attacks Jerome, who disavows paternity. J.B. insists, "I don't care who the father is; I'm the grandfather!" During the chaos, Polly disappears and tries to flee with John. Terrified that he lost Polly and John forever, David finds her, confesses his love, declares to J.B. that he is John's father, and asks Polly to marry him. She accepts.

== Cast ==
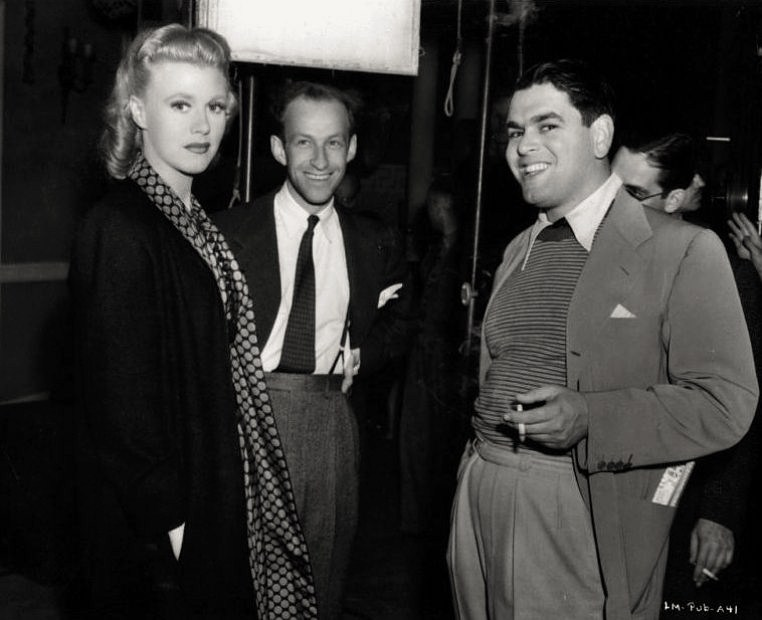
Ginger Rogers, Garson Kanin (director), and Pandro S. Berman (executive producer) on the set

- Ginger Rogers as Polly Parrish
- David Niven as David Merlin
- Charles Coburn as J.B. Merlin
- Frank Albertson as Freddie Miller
- E. E. Clive as Butler
- Elbert Coplen Jr. as Johnnie
- Ferike Boros as Mrs. Weiss
- Ernest Truex as investigator
- Leonard Penn as Jerome Weiss
- Paul Stanton as Hargraves
- Frank M. Thomas as doctor
- Dennie Moore as Mary
- June Wilkins as Louise King
- Barbara Pepper as dance-hall hostess (uncredited)
- Charlie Hall as dance-hall bouncer (uncredited)

== Production ==
The film was a remake of the 1935 Hungarian film Little Mother from Joe Pasternak and Henry Koster which was never screened in the United States.

In November 1938, RKO announced that Little Mother would star Ginger Rogers. It would be the first film produced at the studio by Buddy DeSylva. The film replaced Perfect Honeymoon and She Married for Money in Rogers' schedule at RKO.

Louis Hayward was originally announced as the male lead. RKO then announced Cary Grant would play the role. A few days later, RKO announced Grant was replaced by James Ellison. In January 1939, RKO announced Garson Kanin would direct and Norman Krasna was writing the script. A few days later, the studio announced that the male lead would played by Douglas Fairbanks Jr. In March, it was announced that Fairbanks Jr. would star in The Sun Never Sets at Universal instead and his role would be played by David Niven who had been borrowed from Samuel Goldwyn.

The film had a number of titles. RKO disliked Little Mother and the Hays Office had objections to alternatives they proposed, Bachelor Mother and Baby Trouble. Garson Kanin wanted to call it Baby Makes Three, but producer DeSylva overruled him.

== Reception ==
=== Box office ===
Bachelor Mother earned RKO a profit of $827,000.

== Adaptations to other media ==
Bachelor Mother was adapted as a radio play on several occasions, including five broadcasts of The Screen Guild Theater: the first starred Laraine Day, Henry Fonda and Charles Coburn (February 1, 1942); the second starred Ann Sothern and Fred MacMurray (November 23, 1942); the third starred Ginger Rogers, Francis X. Bushman and David Niven (May 6, 1946); the fourth starred Lucille Ball, Joseph Cotten and Charles Coburn (April 28, 1949); the fifth starred Ann Sothern and Robert Stack (April 20, 1952). It was also adapted as an hour-long play on Lux Radio Theater with Ginger Rogers and Fredric March (January 22, 1940) and on Screen Director's Playhouse with Lucille Ball and Robert Cummings (March 8, 1951).

== See also ==
- List of films set around New Year
