= Little Mother (1935 film) =

1935 film by Henry Koster

- Directed by: Henry Koster
- Written by: Felix Jackson; Fritz Rotter
- Produced by: Joe Pasternak
- Starring: Franciska Gaal; Friedrich Benfer; Otto Wallburg; Ernő Verebes
- Cinematography: István Eiben
- Music by: Nicholas Brodszky
- Production company: Universal-Film
- Distributed by: Universal Pictures
- Release date: 20 April 1935
- Running time: 90 minutes
- Countries: Austria; Hungary
- Language: German

Little Mother (German: Kleine Mutti) is a 1935 Austrian-Hungarian comedy film directed by Henry Koster and starring Franciska Gaal, Friedrich Benfer, and Otto Wallburg. A local subsidiary made the film for the American Universal Pictures. RKO later acquired the rights and remade it in English as the 1939 Bachelor Mother starring Ginger Rogers and David Niven.

== Synopsis ==
After a girl discovers a deserted baby and has to care for her, it is widely assumed that she is the mother.

== Cast ==
- Franciska Gaal as Marie Bonnard
- Friedrich Benfer as Alexander Berkhoff
- Otto Wallburg as Max Berkhoff
- Ernő Verebes as Servant
- Annie Rosar as Annette
- Charles Puffy as Auctionary
- Sigurd Lohde as Dr. Ellard
- Rudolf Carl as Abteilungsdirektor
- Hermine Sterler as Leontine
- Auguste Pünkösdy as Vorsteherin
- Richard Eybner as Philips
- Babette Devrient as ältere Dame
- Felix Dombrowsky as Portier
- Mihail Xantho as Hoteldirektor
- Helene Lauterböck as Schwester
- Jaro Fürth as Lehrer
- Otto Ambros as Verkäfer
- Hanns Waschatko as Bankvorsteher
- Arthur von Duniecki as Oberkellner
- Bandi as Ein Baby

== Bibliography ==
- Jewell, Richard B. RKO Radio Pictures: A Titan Is Born. University of California Press, 2012.
