= Debbie Reynolds =

American actress and singer (1932–2016)

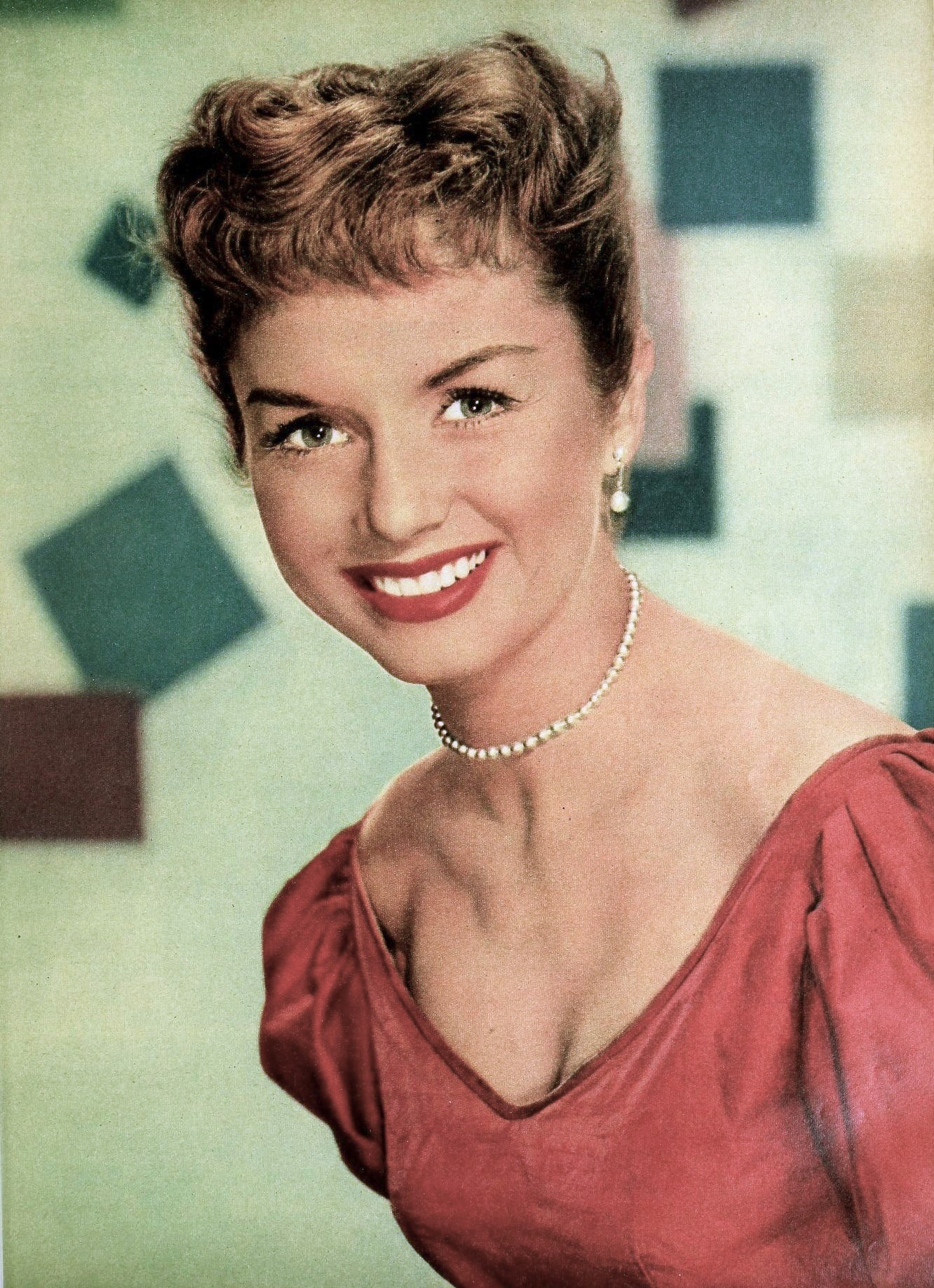
- Reynolds in 1954
- Born: Mary Frances Reynolds; April 1, 1932; El Paso, Texas, U.S.
- Died: December 28, 2016 (aged 84); Los Angeles, California, U.S.
- Burial place: Forest Lawn Memorial Park, Hollywood Hills
- Occupations: Actress; singer; dancer
- Years active: 1948–2016
- Spouses: Eddie Fisher (m. 1955; div. 1959); Harry Karl (m. 1960; div. 1973); Richard Hamlett (m. 1984; div. 1996)
- Children: Carrie Fisher; Todd Fisher
- Relatives: Billie Lourd (granddaughter)
- Website: debbiereynolds.com

Mary Frances "Debbie" Reynolds (April 1, 1932 – December 28, 2016) was an American actress, singer and dancer. She was nominated for a Golden Globe Award for Most Promising Newcomer with her portrayal of Helen Kane in the 1950 film Three Little Words. Her breakout role was her first leading role, as Kathy Selden in Singin' in the Rain (1952).

Her other successes include The Affairs of Dobie Gillis (1953), Susan Slept Here (1954), Bundle of Joy (1956 Golden Globe nomination), The Catered Affair (1956 National Board of Review Best Supporting Actress Winner), and Tammy and the Bachelor (1957), in which she performed the song "Tammy", which topped the Billboard music charts. In 1959, she starred in The Mating Game with Tony Randall, and released Debbie, her first pop music album. She starred in Singin' in the Rain (1952) with Gene Kelly, How the West Was Won (1962), and The Unsinkable Molly Brown (1964), where her performance as the boisterous Titanic passenger Margaret "Molly" Brown earned Reynolds an Academy Award nomination for Best Actress.

Her other films include The Singing Nun (1966), Divorce American Style (1967), What's the Matter with Helen? (1971), Mother (1996; Golden Globe nomination) and In & Out (1997). She was known for voicing Charlotte A. Cavatica in Charlotte's Web (1973). Reynolds was also a cabaret performer; in 1979, she opened the Debbie Reynolds Dance Studio in North Hollywood. Her television series The Debbie Reynolds Show earned her a Golden Globe nomination in 1969. She starred in the 1973 Broadway revival of the musical Irene, which earned her a Tony Award nomination for "Best Leading Actress in a Musical." She was also nominated for a Daytime Emmy Award for her performance in A Gift of Love (1999). After appearing in the early 2000s sitcom Will & Grace, Reynolds was nominated for a Primetime Emmy Award for "Outstanding Guest Actress in a Comedy Series" for her role as Bobbi, the mother of Grace Adler. She reached a new, younger audience with her role as Aggie Cromwell in Disney's Halloweentown series.

Reynolds also had several business ventures besides her dance studio, including a Las Vegas hotel and casino; she was also an avid collector of film memorabilia, beginning with items purchased at the landmark 1970 MGM auction. She served as president of The Thalians, an organization dedicated to mental health causes. After receiving the Screen Actors Guild Life Achievement Award in 2015 and the Jean Hersholt Humanitarian Award in 2016, she made her final film performance in the biographical retrospective Bright Lights. Reynolds died following a hemorrhagic stroke on December 28, 2016, one day after the death of her daughter, actress Carrie Fisher.

== Early life ==
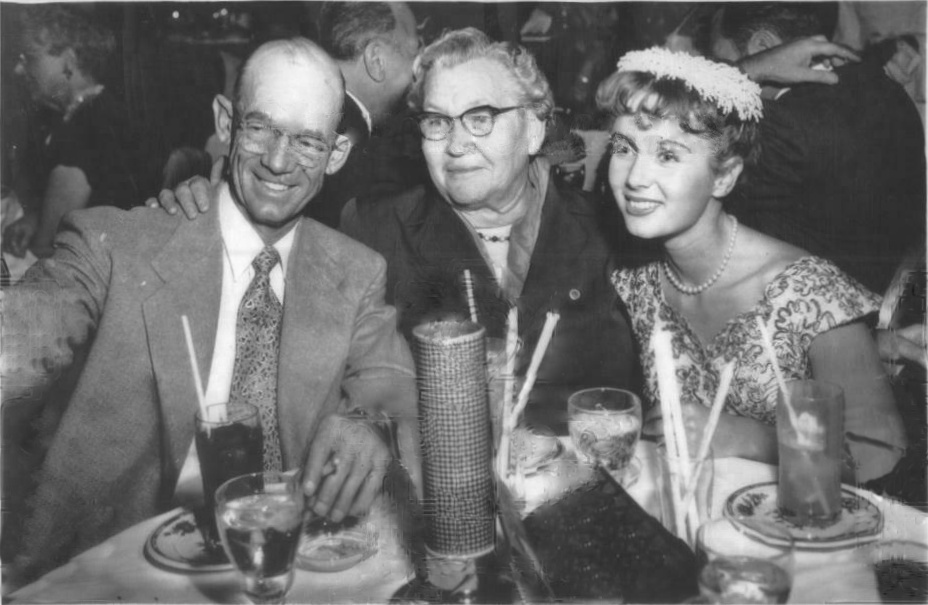
Reynolds (right) with her grandmother O. Harman (center) and father Ray Reynolds in 1955

Mary Frances Reynolds was born on April 1, 1932, in El Paso, Texas, to Maxene N. "Minnie" Harman and Raymond Francis "Ray" Reynolds, a carpenter who worked for the Southern Pacific Railroad. She was of Scottish-Irish and English ancestry and was raised in a strict Nazarene church of her domineering mother. She had an older brother, William, who was two years her senior. Reynolds was a Girl Scout, once saying that she wanted to die as the world's oldest living Girl Scout. Reynolds was also a member of The International Order of Job's Daughters.

Her mother took in laundry for income, while they lived in a shack on Magnolia Street in El Paso. "We may have been poor," she said in a 1963 interview, "but we always had something to eat, even if Dad had to go out in the desert and shoot jackrabbits."

One of the advantages of having been poor is that you learn to appreciate good fortune and the value of a dollar, and poverty holds no fear for you because you know you've gone through it and you can do it again... But we were always a happy family and a religious one. And I'm trying to inculcate in my children the same sense of values, the same tone that my mother gave to me.

Her family moved to Burbank, California, in 1939. When Reynolds was a 16-year-old student at Burbank High School in 1948, she won the Miss Burbank beauty contest. Soon after, she was offered a contract with Warner Brothers and was given the stage name "Debbie" by studio head Jack L. Warner.

One of her closest high school friends said that she rarely dated during her teenaged years in Burbank.

They never found her attractive in school. She was cute, but sort of tomboyish, and her family never had any money to speak of. She never dressed well or drove a car. And, I think, during all the years in school, she was invited to only one dance.

Reynolds agreed, saying, "when I started, I didn't even know how to dress. I wore dungarees and a shirt. I had no money, no taste, and no training." Her friend adds:

I say this in all sincerity. Debbie can serve as an inspiration to all young American womanhood. She came up the hard way, and she has a realistic sense of values based on faith, love, work, and money. Life has been kind to her because she has been kind to life. She's a young woman with a conscience, which is something rare in Hollywood actresses. She also has a refreshing sense of honesty.

== Career ==
=== Film and television ===
Reynolds was discovered by talent scouts from Warner Bros. and MGM, who were at the 1948 Miss Burbank contest. Both companies wanted her to sign up with their studio, and had to flip a coin to see which one got her. Warner Bros. won the coin toss, and she was with the studio for two years. When Warner Bros. stopped producing musicals, she moved to MGM.

With MGM, Reynolds regularly appeared in movie musicals during the 1950s, and had several hit records during the period. Her song "Aba Daba Honeymoon" (featured in the film Two Weeks with Love (1950) and sung as a duet with co-star Carleton Carpenter) was the first soundtrack recording to become a top-of-the-chart gold record, reaching number three on the Billboard charts.

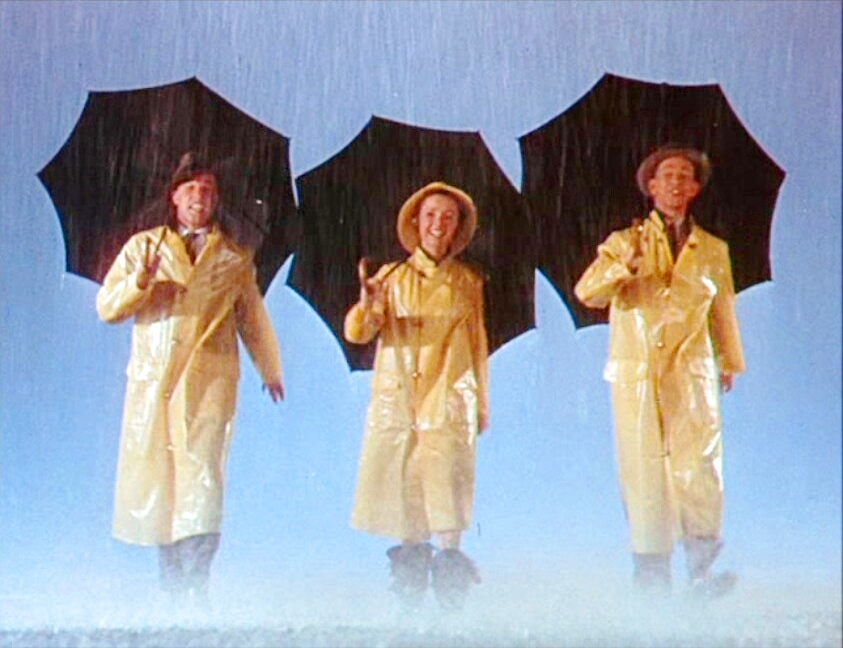
Gene Kelly, Reynolds, and Donald O'Connor during the Singin' in the Rain trailer (1952)

Her performance in the film greatly impressed the studio, which then gave her a co-starring role in what became her highest-profile film, Singin' in the Rain (1952), a satire on movie-making in Hollywood during the transition from silent to sound pictures. It co-starred Gene Kelly, whom she called a "great dancer and cinematic genius," adding, "He made me a star. I was 18 and he taught me how to dance and how to work hard and be dedicated." In 1956, she appeared in the musical Bundle of Joy with her then-husband, Eddie Fisher.

Reynolds was one of 14 top-billed names in How the West Was Won (1962) but she was the only one who appeared throughout, the story largely following the life and times of her character Lilith Prescott. In the film, she sang three songs: "What Was Your Name in the States?", as her pioneering family begin their westward journey; "Raise a Ruckus Tonight", starting a party around a wagon train camp fire; and, three times, "Home in the Meadow" – to the tune of "Greensleeves" with lyrics by Sammy Cahn.

Her starring role in The Unsinkable Molly Brown (1964) led to a nomination for the Academy Award for Best Actress. Reynolds noted that she initially had issues with its director, Charles Walters. "He didn't want me," she said. "He wanted Shirley MacLaine," who at the time was unable to take the role. "He said, 'You are totally wrong for the part.'" But six weeks into production, he reversed his opinion. "He came to me and said, 'I have to admit that I was wrong. You are playing the role really well. I'm pleased.'" Reynolds also played in Goodbye Charlie, a 1964 comedy film about a callous womanizer who gets his just reward. It was adapted from George Axelrod's play Goodbye, Charlie and also starred Tony Curtis and Pat Boone.

She next portrayed Jeanine Deckers in The Singing Nun (1966). In what Reynolds once called the "stupidest mistake of my entire career," she made headlines in 1970 after instigating a fight with the NBC television network over cigarette advertising on her weekly television show. Although she was television's highest-paid female performer at the time, she quit the show for breaking its contract:

I was shocked to discover that the initial commercial aired during the premiere of my new series was devoted to a nationally advertised brand of cigarette (Pall Mall). I fully outlined my personal feelings concerning cigarette advertising ... that I will not be a party to such commercials, which I consider directly opposed to health and well-being.

When NBC explained to Reynolds that banning cigarette commercials from her show would be impossible, she kept her resolve. The show drew mixed reviews, but according to NBC, it captured about 42% of the nation's viewing audience. She said later she was especially concerned about the commercials because of the number of children watching the show. She did quit doing the show after about a year, which she said had cost her about $2 million of lost income: "Maybe I was a fool to quit the show, but at least I was an honest fool. I'm not a phony or pretender. With me, it wasn't a question of money, but integrity. I'm the one who has to live with myself." The dispute would have been rendered moot and in Reynolds' favor anyway had she not resigned; by 1971, the Public Health Cigarette Smoking Act (which had been passed into law before she left the show) would ban all radio and television advertising for tobacco products.

Reynolds voiced Charlotte in the Hanna-Barbera animated musical Charlotte's Web (1973), where she originated the song "Mother Earth and Father Time." Reynolds continued to make other appearances in film and television. She played Helen Chappel Hackett's mother, Deedee Chappel, on the Wings episode "If It's Not One Thing, It's Your Mother," which first aired November 22, 1994.

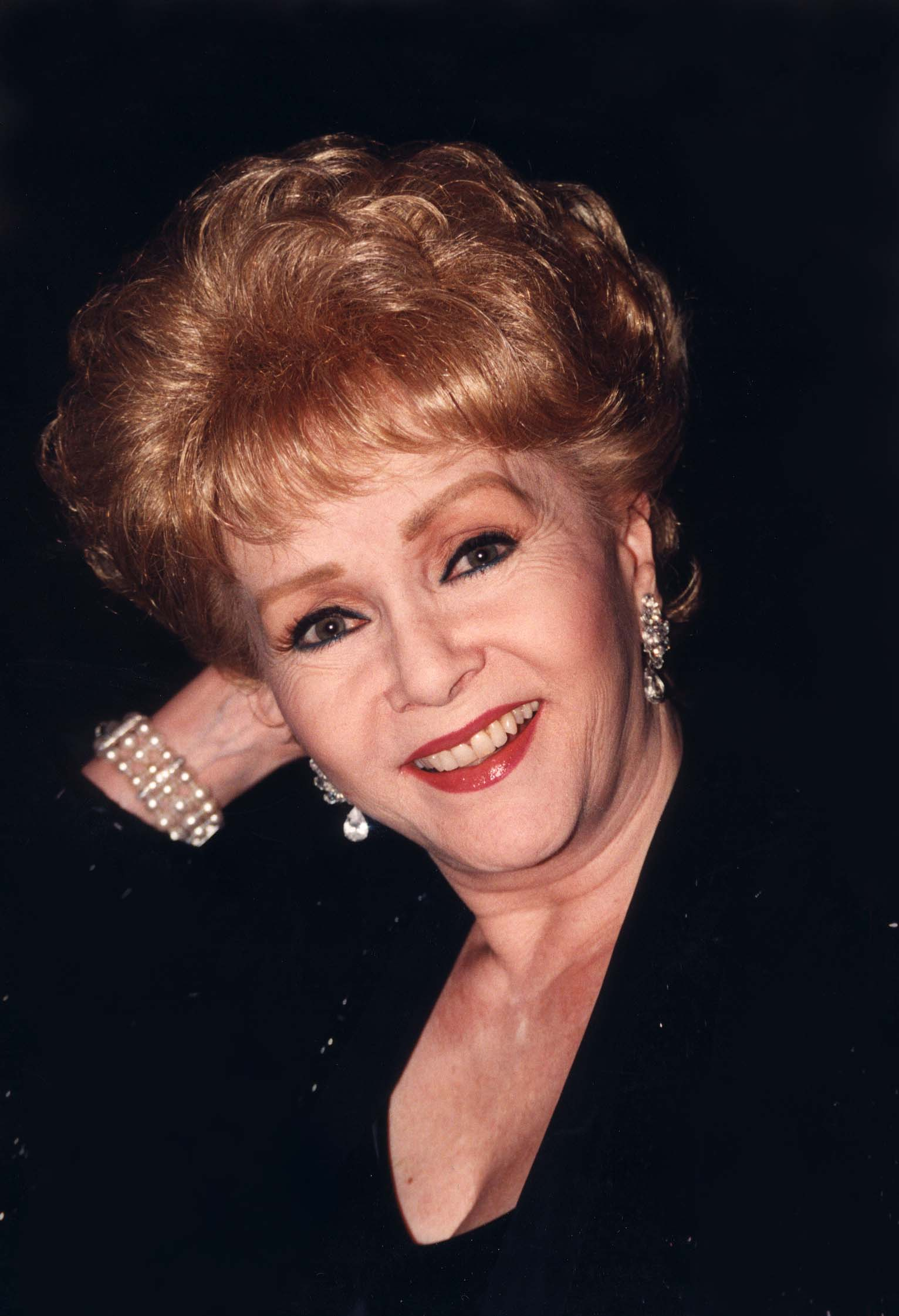
Reynolds in 1998

From 1999 to 2006, she played Grace Adler's theatrical mother, Bobbi Adler, on the NBC sitcom Will & Grace, which earned Reynolds her only Emmy Award nomination for Outstanding Guest Actress in a Comedy Series in 2000. She played a recurring role in the Disney Channel Original Movie Halloweentown film series as Aggie Cromwell. Reynolds made a guest appearance as a presenter at the 69th Academy Awards in 1997.

In 2000, Reynolds took up a recurring voice role on the children's television program Rugrats, playing the grandmother of two of the characters. In 2001, she co-starred with Elizabeth Taylor, Shirley MacLaine, and Joan Collins in the comedy These Old Broads, a television movie written for her by her daughter, Carrie Fisher. She had a cameo role as herself in the 2004 film Connie and Carla. In 2013, she appeared in Behind the Candelabra, as the mother of Liberace.

Reynolds appears with her daughter in Bright Lights: Starring Carrie Fisher and Debbie Reynolds, a 2016 documentary about the very close relationship between the two. It premiered at the 2016 Cannes Film Festival. The television premiere was January 7, 2017, on HBO. According to USA Today, the film is "an intimate portrait of Hollywood royalty ... [it] loosely chronicles their lives through interviews, photos, footage, and vintage home movies... It culminates in a moving scene, just as Reynolds is preparing to receive the 2015 Screen Actors Guild Life Achievement Award, which Fisher presented to her mom."

=== Music career and cabaret ===
Her recording of the song "Tammy" (1957; from Tammy and the Bachelor) earned her a gold record. It was a number one single on the Billboard pop charts in 1957. In the movie (the first of the Tammy film series), she co-starred with Leslie Nielsen.

Reynolds also scored two other top-25 Billboard hits with "A Very Special Love" (number 20 in January 1958) and "Am I That Easy to Forget" (number 25 in March 1960)—a pop-music version of a country-music hit made famous by Carl Belew (in 1959), Skeeter Davis (in 1960), and several years later by singer Engelbert Humperdinck.

She released The Best of Debbie Reynolds album in 1991.

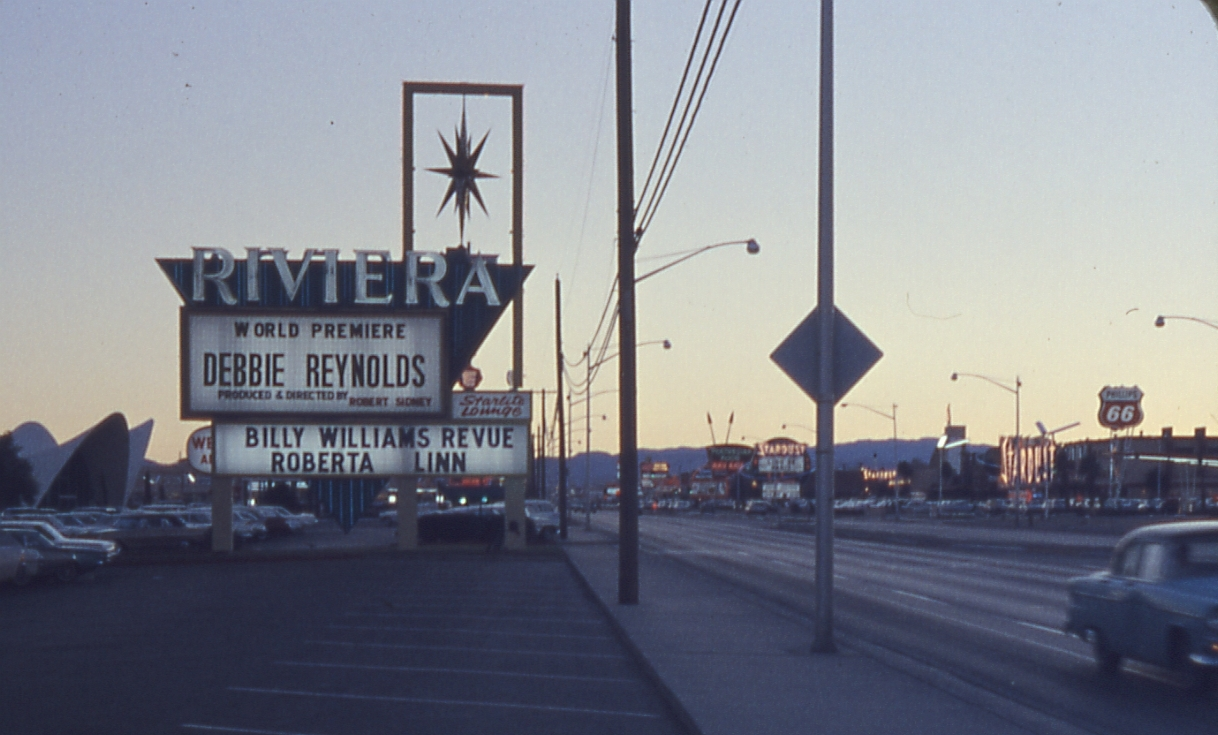
Marquee listing Reynolds' world premiere at the Riviera Hotel, Las Vegas, December 1962

For 10 years, she headlined for about three months a year in Las Vegas's Riviera Hotel. She enjoyed live shows, though that type of performing "was extremely strenuous," she said in 1966:

With a performing schedule of two shows a night, seven nights a week, it's probably the toughest kind of show business, but in my opinion, the most rewarding. I like the feeling of being able to change stage bits and business when I want. You can't do that in motion pictures or TV.

As part of her nightclub act, Reynolds was noted for doing impressions of celebrities such as Eva and Zsa Zsa Gabor, Mae West, Barbra Streisand, Phyllis Diller, and Bette Davis. Her impersonation of Davis was inspired following their co-starring roles in the 1956 film, The Catered Affair. Reynolds had started doing stage impersonations as a teenager; her impersonation of Betty Hutton was performed as a singing number during the Miss Burbank contest in 1948.

Her 1992 holiday collaboration with Donald O'Connor, Christmas with Donald and Debbie, arranged and conducted by Angelo DiPippo, would be her final album release.

Reynolds was also a French horn player. Gene Kelly, reflecting on Reynolds's sudden fame, recalled, "There were times when Debbie was more interested in playing the French horn somewhere in the San Fernando Valley or attending a Girl Scout meeting.... She didn't realize she was a movie star all of a sudden."

=== Stage work ===
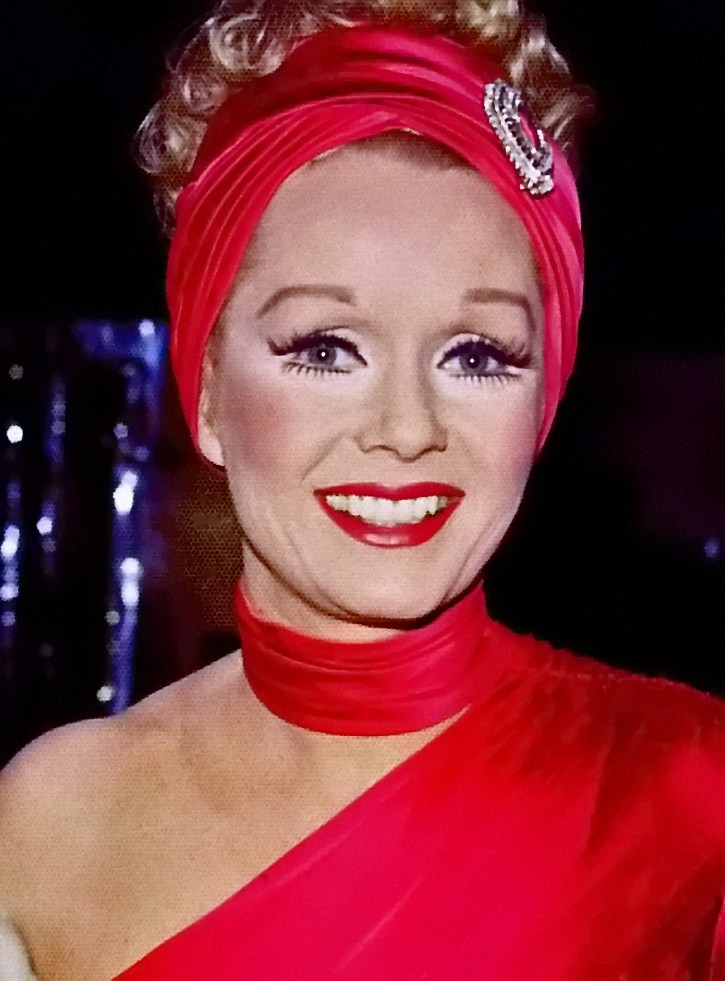
Reynolds prior to performing a show in Las Vegas in 1975

With limited film and television opportunities coming her way, Reynolds accepted an opportunity to make her Broadway debut. She starred in the 1973 revival of Irene, a musical first produced 60 years before. When asked why she waited so long to appear in a Broadway play, she explained:

Primarily because I had two children growing up, I could make movies and recordings and plays in nearby Las Vegas and handle a television series without being away from them. Now, they are well on the way to being adults. Also, there was the matter of being offered a show that I felt might be right for me ... I felt that Irene was it and now was the time.

Reynolds and her daughter Carrie both made their Broadway debuts in the play. Per reports, the production broke records for the highest weekly gross of any musical. For that production, she received a Tony nomination. Reynolds also starred in the Broadway revue Debbie in 1976. She toured with Harve Presnell in Annie Get Your Gun, then wrapped up the Broadway run of Woman of the Year in 1983, while Fisher was appearing in Agnes of God. In the late 1980s, Reynolds repeated her role as Molly Brown in the stage version of The Unsinkable Molly Brown, first opposite Presnell (repeating his original Broadway and movie role) and later with Ron Raines.

- Best Foot Forward (1953) (Dallas State Fair)
- Irene (1973) (Broadway and US national tour)
- Debbie (1976) (Broadway)
- Annie Get Your Gun (1977) (San Francisco and Los Angeles)
- Woman of the Year (1982) (Broadway) (replacement for Lauren Bacall)
- The Unsinkable Molly Brown (1989) (US national tour)
- Irene (2008) Perth Western Australia

In 2010, she appeared in her own West End show Debbie Reynolds: Alive and Fabulous.

=== Film history preservation ===
Reynolds amassed a large collection of movie memorabilia, beginning with items from the landmark 1970 Metro-Goldwyn-Mayer auction, and she displayed them, first in a museum at her Las Vegas hotel and casino during the 1990s and later in a museum close to the Kodak Theatre in Los Angeles.

The museum was to relocate to be the centerpiece of the Belle Island Village tourist attraction in the resort city of Pigeon Forge, Tennessee, but the developer went bankrupt. The museum filed for Chapter 11 bankruptcy in June 2009. The most valuable asset of the museum was Reynolds' collection. Todd Fisher, Reynolds' son, announced that his mother was "heartbroken" to have to auction off the collection. It was valued at $10.79 million in the bankruptcy filing. Los Angeles auction firm Profiles in History was given the responsibility of conducting a series of auctions. Among the "more than 3500 costumes, 20,000 photographs, and thousands of movie posters, costume sketches, and props" included in the sales were Charlie Chaplin's bowler hat and Marilyn Monroe's white "subway dress," whose skirt is lifted up by the breeze from a passing subway train in the film The Seven Year Itch (1955). The dress sold for $4.6 million in 2011; the final auction was held in May 2014.

=== Business ventures ===
In 1979, Reynolds opened her own dance studio in North Hollywood. In 1983, she released an exercise video, Do It Debbie's Way! She purchased the Clarion Hotel and Casino, a hotel and casino in Las Vegas, in 1992. She renamed it the Debbie Reynolds Hollywood Hotel but it was not a success and Reynolds was forced to declare bankruptcy in 1997. In June 2010, she replaced Ivana Trump on the Globe weekly's advice column but many of the published letters were plagiarized from Slate's Dear Prudence and possibly others.

=== Advocacy ===
Reynolds was a longtime ally of the LGBT community and an early advocate for people with AIDS. In 1983, Reynolds performed at an AIDS fundraiser with her friend Shirley MacLaine. In a 2014 interview with The Daily Telegraph, Reynolds revealed that she had helped several closeted actors conceal their homosexuality by dating them. When asked when she realized she was a gay icon, Reynolds replied, "Over the years many of the boys that have worked for me as dancers have been gay. The creative people were all gay people, from producers to writers. To me, they were just family."

== Marriages and later life ==
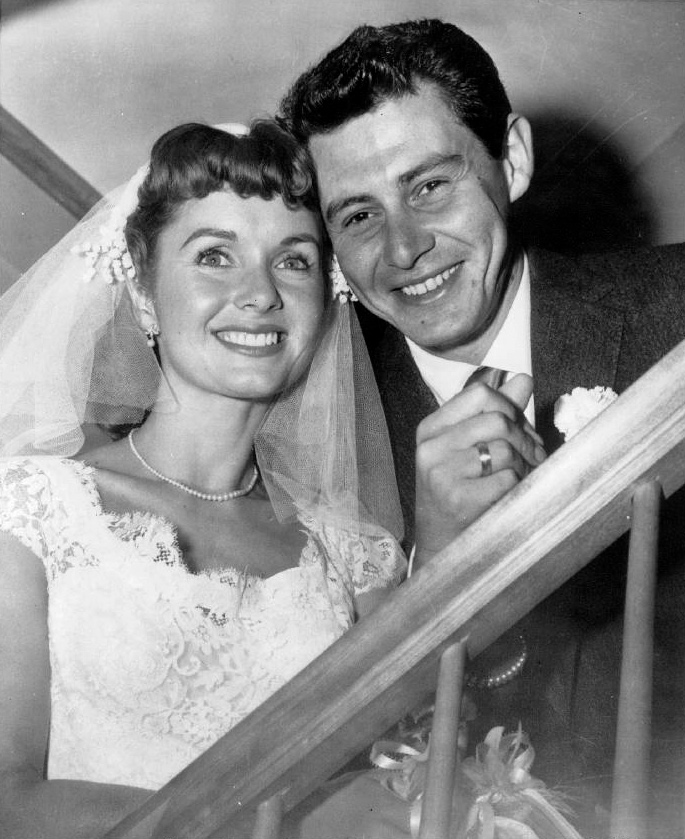
Reynolds and Eddie Fisher on their wedding day, 1955

Reynolds was married three times. Her first marriage was to singer and actor Eddie Fisher in 1955. They became the parents of Carrie Fisher and Todd Fisher. The couple divorced in 1959 when it was revealed shortly after the death of Elizabeth Taylor's husband Mike Todd that Fisher had been having an affair with her; Taylor and Reynolds were good friends at the time. The Eddie Fisher – Elizabeth Taylor affair was a great public scandal, which led to the cancellation of Eddie Fisher's television show.

In 2011, Reynolds was on The Oprah Winfrey Show just weeks before Elizabeth Taylor's death. She explained that Taylor and she happened to be traveling at the same time on the ocean liner (RMS Queen Elizabeth) some time in the 1960s when they reconciled. Reynolds sent a note to Taylor's room, and Taylor sent a note in reply asking to have dinner with Reynolds and end their feud. As Reynolds described it, "we had a wonderful evening with a lot of laughs." In 1972, she noted the bright side of the divorce and her remarriage:

Now in retrospect, though it was not my will, I think it probably was the best thing that ever happened to me. He did give me two great children and for that I will ever be grateful. Our door is always open to him. I believe in peaceful coexistence and being friends with the father of your children.

Life is both faith and love. Without faith, love is only one dimensional and incomplete. Faith helps you to overlook other people's shortcomings, and love them as they are. If you ask too much of any relationship, you can't help but be disappointed. But if you ask nothing, you can't be hurt or disappointed.

— Debbie Reynolds (1964)

Reynolds' second marriage, to millionaire businessman Harry Karl, lasted from 1960 to 1973. For a period during the 1960s, she stopped working at the studio on Friday afternoons to attend Girl Scout meetings, since she was the leader of the Girl Scout Troop of which her 13-year-old daughter Carrie and her stepdaughter Tina Karl, also 13, were members. Reynolds later found herself in financial difficulty because of Karl's gambling and bad investments.

Reynolds' third marriage was to real estate developer Richard Hamlett from 1984 to 1996.

In 2011, Reynolds stepped down after 56 years of involvement in The Thalians, a charitable organization devoted to children and adults with mental-health issues.

Reynolds was hospitalized in October 2012 at Cedars-Sinai Medical Center in Los Angeles due to an adverse reaction to medication. She canceled appearances and concert engagements for the next three months.

She published the autobiographies Debbie: My Life in 1988 and Unsinkable: A Memoir in 2013.

== Death and legacy ==
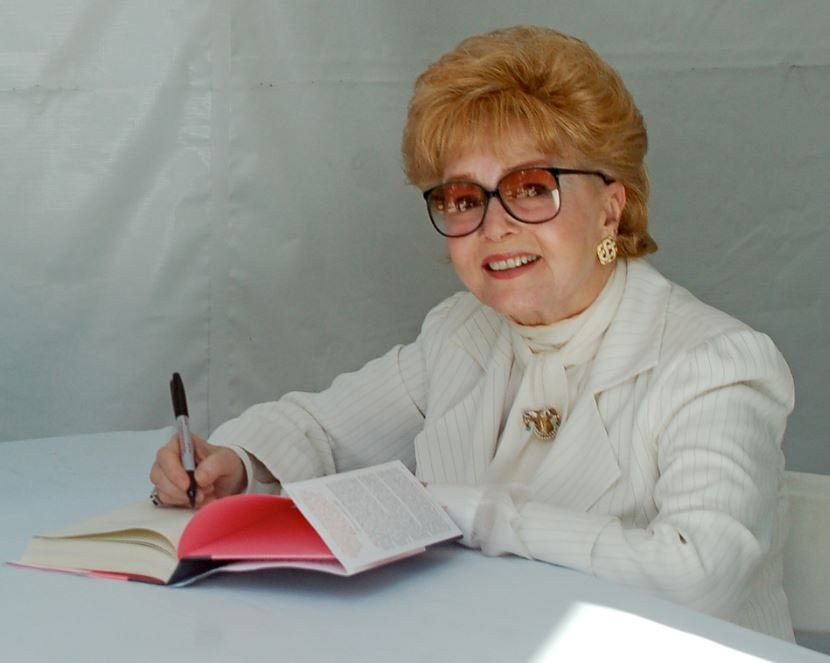
Reynolds in April 2013

On December 28, 2016, Reynolds was taken by ambulance to Cedars-Sinai Medical Center in Los Angeles, after suffering a "severe stroke". Later that afternoon, Reynolds was pronounced dead at Cedars-Sinai hospital, at 84 years of age.

The Los Angeles Coroner's Office determined, on January 9, 2017, that intracerebral hemorrhage, a common cause of stroke, was Debbie Reynolds' cause of death. Specifically, one of her blood vessels ruptured, which led to fatal bleeding in her brain. The coroner's report cited hypertension as the underlying cause of the hemorrhage.

Only five days previous, on December 23, 2016, Debbie Reynolds' daughter, actress and writer Carrie Fisher, had suffered a medical emergency on a flight from London to Los Angeles; Carrie died one day before her mother, on December 27, 2016, at the age of 60, at Ronald Reagan UCLA Medical Center.

Todd Fisher later said that Reynolds had been seriously affected by her daughter's death, and that her grief partially contributed to her stroke, noting that his mother had stated, "I want to be with Carrie," shortly before she died. During an interview for the December 30, 2016, airing of the ABC-TV program 20/20, Todd Fisher elaborated on this, saying that his mother had joined his sister in death because Reynolds "didn't want to leave Carrie and did not want her to be alone." He added, "she didn't die of a broken heart" as some news reports had implied, but rather "just left to be with Carrie."

Reynolds was entombed with a portion of her daughter's ashes at Forest Lawn Memorial Park in Hollywood Hills during a memorial service held on January 6, 2017. The remainder of Carrie Fisher's ashes are held in a giant, novelty Prozac pill.

== Awards and honors ==
Reynolds was the 1955 Hasty Pudding Woman of the Year. Her footprints and handprints are preserved at Grauman's Chinese Theatre in Hollywood, California. She also has a star on the Hollywood Walk of Fame, at 6654 Hollywood Boulevard, for live performance and a Golden Palm Star on the Palm Springs, California, Walk of Stars dedicated to her. In keeping with the celebrity tradition of the Shenandoah Apple Blossom Festival of Winchester, Virginia, Reynolds was honored as the Grand Marshal of the 2011 ABF that took place from April 26 to May 1, 2011.

On November 4, 2006, Reynolds received the Lifetime Achievement in the Arts Award from Chapman University (Orange, California). On May 17, 2007, she was awarded an honorary degree of Doctor of Humane Letters from the University of Nevada, Reno, where she had contributed for many years to the film studies program.

Awards and nominations
Year	Association	Category	Nominated work	Result	References
1951	Golden Globe Awards	New Star of the Year – Actress	Three Little Words	Nominated	
1956	National Board of Review	Best Supporting Actress	The Catered Affair	Won	
1957	Golden Globe Awards	Best Actress – Motion Picture Musical or Comedy	Bundle of Joy	Nominated	
1965	Academy Awards	Best Actress	The Unsinkable Molly Brown	Nominated	
1965	Golden Globe Awards	Best Actress – Motion Picture Musical or Comedy	The Unsinkable Molly Brown	Nominated	
1970	Golden Globe Awards	Best Actress – Television Series Musical or Comedy	The Debbie Reynolds Show	Nominated	
1973	Tony Awards	Best Actress in a Musical	Irene	Nominated	
1997	American Comedy Awards	Lifetime Achievement Award in Comedy	Herself	Won	
1997	Golden Globe Awards	Best Actress – Motion Picture Musical or Comedy	Mother	Nominated	
1997	Satellite Awards	Best Supporting Actress – Motion Picture	Mother	Won	
1998	Blockbuster Entertainment Awards	Favorite Supporting Actress – Comedy	In & Out	Nominated	
2000	Daytime Emmy Awards	Outstanding Performer in a Children's Special	A Gift of Love: The Daniel Huffman Story	Nominated	
2000	Primetime Emmy Awards	Outstanding Guest Actress in a Comedy Series	Will & Grace	Nominated	
2014	Screen Actors Guild	Life Achievement Award	Herself	Won	
2015	Academy Awards	Jean Hersholt Humanitarian Award	Herself	Won	

== Filmography ==
Year	Title	Role	Notes
1948	June Bride	Boo's Girlfriend at Wedding	Uncredited
1950	The Daughter of Rosie O'Grady	Maureen O'Grady	
1950	Three Little Words	Helen Kane	
1950	Two Weeks with Love	Melba Robinson	
1951	Mr. Imperium	Gwen	
1952	Singin' in the Rain	Kathy Selden	
1952	Skirts Ahoy!	Herself	Uncredited
1953	I Love Melvin	Judy Schneider / Judy LeRoy	
1953	The Affairs of Dobie Gillis	Pansy Hammer	
1953	Give a Girl a Break	Suzy Doolittle	
1954	Susan Slept Here	Susan Beauregard Landis	
1954	Athena	Minerva Mulvain	
1955	Hit the Deck	Carol Pace	
1955	The Tender Trap	Julie Gillis	
1956	Meet Me in Las Vegas	Herself (uncredited)	
1956	The Catered Affair	Jane Hurley	
1956	Bundle of Joy	Polly Parish	
1957	Tammy and the Bachelor	Tammy	
1958	This Happy Feeling	Janet Blake	
1959	The Mating Game	Mariette Larkin	
1959	Say One for Me	Holly LeMaise, aka Conroy	
1959	It Started with a Kiss	Maggie Putnam	
1959	The Gazebo	Nell Nash	
1960	The Rat Race	Peggy Brown	
1960	Pepe	Cameo	
1961	The Pleasure of His Company	Jessica Anne Poole	
1961	The Second Time Around	Lucretia 'Lu' Rogers	
1962	How the West Was Won	Lilith Prescott	
1963	My Six Loves	Janice Courtney	
1963	Mary, Mary	Mary McKellaway	
1964	The Unsinkable Molly Brown	Molly Brown	
1964	Goodbye Charlie	Charlie Sorel/Virginia Mason	
1966	The Singing Nun	Sister Ann	
1967	Divorce American Style	Barbara Harmon	
1968	How Sweet It Is!	Jenny Henderson	
1969	Debbie Reynolds and the Sound of Children	Herself	TV movie
1971	What's the Matter with Helen?	Adelle	
1973	Charlotte's Web	Charlotte A. Cavatica (voice)	
1974	Busby Berkeley	Herself	Documentary
1974	That's Entertainment!	Herself	Compilation film
1987	Sadie and Son	Sadie	TV movie
1989	Perry Mason: The Case of the Musical Murder	Amanda Cody	TV movie
1992	Battling for Baby	Helen	TV movie
1992	The Bodyguard	Herself	Cameo
1993	Jack L. Warner: The Last Mogul	Herself	Documentary
1993	Heaven & Earth	Eugenia	
1994	That's Entertainment! III	Herself	Compilation film
1996	Mother	Beatrice Henderson	
1996	Wedding Bell Blues	Herself	
1997	In & Out	Berniece Brackett	
1998	Fear and Loathing in Las Vegas	Herself (voice)	
1998	Kiki's Delivery Service	Madame (voice, Disney English dub)	
1998	Zack and Reba	Beulah Blanton	
1998	Rudolph the Red-Nosed Reindeer: The Movie	Mrs. Claus/Rudolph's Mother/Mrs. Prancer	Voice
1998	Halloweentown	Agatha "Aggie" Cromwell	TV movie
1998	The Christmas Wish	Ruth	TV movie
1999	A Gift of Love: The Daniel Huffman Story	Shirlee Allison	TV movie
1999	Keepers of the Frame	Herself	Documentary
2000	Rugrats in Paris: The Movie	Lulu Pickles (voice)	
2000	Virtual Mom	Gwen	TV movie
2000	Rugrats: Acorn Nuts & Diapey Butts	Lulu Johnson (voice)	
2001	These Old Broads	Piper Grayson	TV movie
2001	Halloweentown II: Kalabar's Revenge	Agatha "Aggie" Cromwell	TV movie
2002	Cinerama Adventure	Herself (interviewee)	Documentary
2002	Generation Gap	Herself	TV movie
2004	Connie and Carla	Herself	
2004	Halloweentown High	Agatha "Aggie" Cromwell	TV movie
2006	Return to Halloweentown	Splendora Agatha "Aggie" Cromwell	TV movie; Cameo appearance
2006	Lolo's Cafe	Mrs. Atkins (voice)	TV movie
2007	Mr. Warmth: The Don Rickles Project	Herself (interviewee)	Documentary
2008	Light of Olympia	Queen (voice)	
2008	The Jill & Tony Curtis Story	Herself	Documentary
2008	The Brothers Warner	Herself	Documentary
2008	Fay Wray: A Life	Herself	Documentary
2012	One for the Money	Grandma Mazur	
2013	Behind the Candelabra	Frances Liberace	TV movie
2016	Bright Lights: Starring Carrie Fisher and Debbie Reynolds	Herself	Documentary

Short subjects

- A Visit with Debbie Reynolds (1959)
- The Story of a Dress (1964)
- In the Picture (2012)

== Partial television credits ==
Year	Title	Role	Episodes	References
1981	Aloha Paradise	Sydney Chase	8 episodes	
1982	Alice	Felicia Blake	Episode: "Sorry, Wrong Lips!"	
1982	Madame's Place	Self	Episode: "Movie Stars and Producers"	
1991	The Golden Girls	Truby	"There Goes the Bride: Part 2"	
1994	Wings	Deedee Chappel	"If It's Not One Thing, It's Your Mother"	
1997	Roseanne	Audrey Conner	"Arsenic and Old Mom"	
1999–2006	Will & Grace	Bobbi Adler	12 episodes	
2000–2002	Rugrats	Lulu Pickles (voice)	10 episodes	
2003	Tracey Ullman in the Trailer Tales	Herself	TV comedy special	
2003–2007	Kim Possible	Nana Possible (voice)	4 episodes	
2008	Family Guy	Mrs. Wilson (voice)	Episode: "Tales of a Third Grade Nothing"	
2010	The Penguins of Madagascar	Granny Squirrel (voice)	"The Lost Treasure of the Golden Squirrel"	
2010	RuPaul's Drag Race	Self (guest judge)	Episode: "Golden Gals"	
2011	So You Think You Can Dance	Self (guest judge)	(Alongside Nigel Lythgoe & Mary Murphy)	
2015	The 7D	Queen Whimsical (voice)	"Big Rock Candy Flim-Flam / Doing the 7D Dance"	

== Radio broadcasts ==
Year	Program	Episode/source
September 8, 1952	Lux Radio Theatre	Two Weeks with Love

== Books ==
- Reynolds, Debbie (with David Patrick Columbia) (1988). Debbie: My Life. William Morrow and Company. ISBN 978-0-688-06633-8.
- Reynolds, Debbie (with Dorian Hannaway) (2013). Unsinkable: A Memoir. William Morrow and Company. ISBN 978-0-06-221365-5.
- Reynolds, Debbie (with Dorian Hannaway) (2015). Make 'Em Laugh: Short-Term Memories of Longtime Friends. William Morrow and Company. ISBN 978-0-06-241663-6.

== See also ==
- List of American film actresses
- List of people from California
- List of people from Texas
