= RKO Radio Pictures: A Titan Is Born =

- First edition
- Author: Richard B. Jewell
- Language: English
- Genre: Non-fiction
- Publisher: University of California Press
- Publication date: 2012

RKO Radio Pictures: A Titan Is Born is a 2012 non-fiction book about RKO Radio Pictures and written by Richard B Jewell.
