= Hypertension and the brain =

Hypertension graphic

Hypertension is a condition characterized by an elevated blood pressure in which the long term consequences include cardiovascular disease, kidney disease, adrenal gland tumors, vision impairment, memory loss, metabolic syndrome, stroke and dementia. It affects nearly 1 in 2 Americans and remains as a contributing cause of death in the United States. There are many genetic and environmental factors involved with the development of hypertension including genetics, diet, and stress.

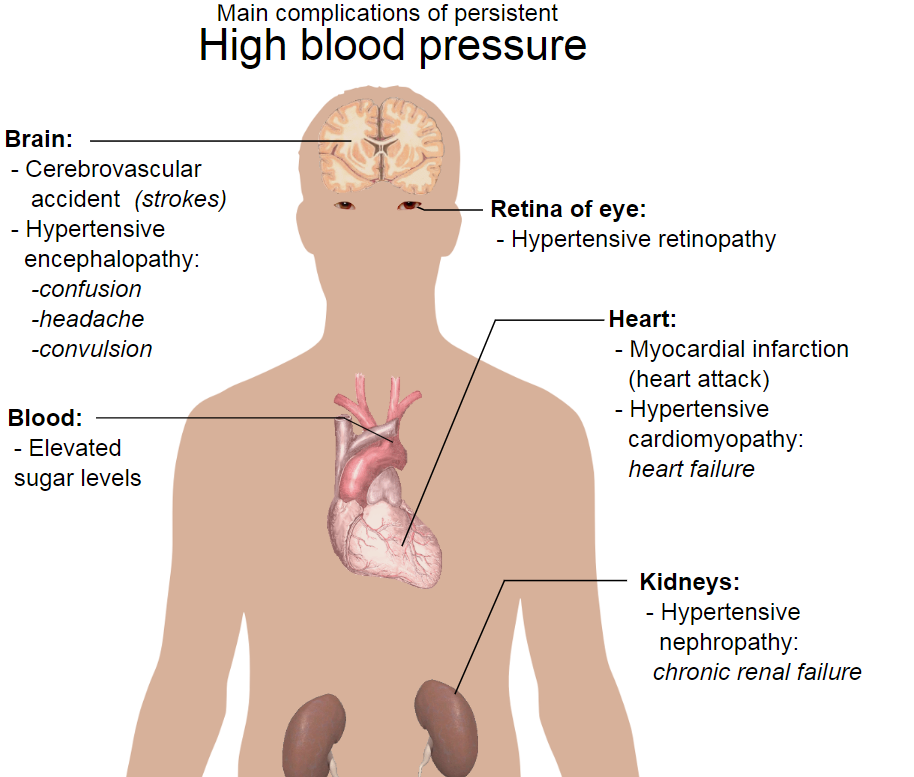
Complications of hypertension

The brain is one of the major organs affected by hypertension and recent findings have linked hypertension to various forms of cognitive decline. Not only does hypertension affect the cellular structure and molecular composition of blood vessels (arteries, veins, capillaries), it also affects their ability to regulate vital functions that are essential for healthy brain function such as oxygen and glucose delivery, cerebral environment control via the blood-brain barrier, and trafficking of immune cells and metabolic by-products. These hypertension-induced effects eventually lead to white matter lesions, which is the pathological basis for hypertension-induced cognitive impairment. A National Institute on Aging (NIA) study that measured cognition twenty years after measuring blood pressure showed that there was a 9% increase in risk for cognitive decline for every 10mmHg increase in systolic blood pressure. Additionally, the Atherosclerosis Risk in Communities cognitive study shows that those with prehypertension or high blood pressure performed lower on processing speed, short-term memory, and executive function tests. Hypertension is also a prominent risk factor for two major brain diseases: stroke and dementia, and accounts for approximately 50% of deaths caused by stroke or heart disease according to the World Health Organization (WHO).

== Hypertension ==
=== Primary and secondary hypertension ===
Primary hypertension, also known as essential hypertension, is the result of a consistent elevation of the force of blood being pumped throughout the body, whereas secondary hypertension is the result of high blood pressure due to another medical condition. Diseases that can cause secondary hypertension include diabetic nephropathy, glomerular disease, polycystic kidney disease, cushing syndrome, pheochromocytoma, aldosteronism, sleep apnea, obesity, and pregnancy. Most often, there are no definite symptoms to this disease. There are some signs that one could look for to deduce it is secondary hypertension rather than primary such as sudden onset of hypertension before the age of 30 or after 55, no family history of hypertension, hypertension that does not respond to medication (resistant hypertension), and no signs of obesity.

=== Salt-sensitive hypertension ===
In terms of environmental factors, dietary salt intake is the leading risk factor in the development of hypertension. Salt sensitivity is characterized by an increase in blood pressure with an increase in dietary salt and is associated with various genetic, demographic, and physiological factors—African American populations, postmenopausal women, and older individuals carry a higher risk of developing salt sensitivity. In normal conditions, the body counteracts excessive salt intake by increasing cardiac output and expanding extracellular fluid volume. However, individuals who are salt-sensitive exhibit an over reactive sympathetic nervous system and are unable to suppress the renin-angiotensin axis as well as normotensive individuals, resulting in salt retention by the kidneys and increased vascular resistance and consequently, increased risk of developing hypertension. Furthermore, it is estimated that 51% of people that are hypertensive are salt sensitive compared to 26% of people that are normotensive.

Salt sensitivity is often associated with endothelial dysfunction due to reduced nitric oxide (NO) production and endothelial NO synthase activity, which impairs vasodilation. During sodium intake, an increased production of NO in the kidneys and peripheral vasculature is imperative for sodium balance and regulation of blood pressure.

==== Hypertension induced by angiotensin II ====
Renin-angiotensin-aldosterone system (RAS)

The renin-angiotensin-aldosterone system (RAAS) regulates blood pressure, fluid and electrolyte homeostasis, and vascular resistance via release of hormones. The system is initiated by renin converting the precursor protein angiotensinogen into angiotensin I (Ang I). Ang I then gets converted to Ang II by the angiotensin-converting-enzyme (ACE) which then goes on to produce a number of different effects on the body. One such effect is inducing hypertension via Ang II and Ang metabolites produced by the degradation of Ang I and Ang II. Ang II increases blood pressure by constricting blood vessels and it stimulates the production of aldosterone, which also increases blood pressure by increasing the volume of fluid in the body via increased sodium reabsorption by renal tubules in the kidney. Hypertension is associated with enhanced RAAS activity.

There are several Ang receptors in the body with the most common being AT1R, which is expressed in the heart, kidney, gut, blood vessels, and the brain. Ang II binds AT1R to produce vasoconstriction, inflammation, and endothelial dysfunction. Activation of AT2R has opposite effects of those to AT1R, exerting hypotensive effects.

== Pathophysiology ==
=== Endothelial dysfunction ===
The endothelium plays a critical role in regulating blood vessels throughout the body, modulating the function of cells with the vessel walls and even non-vascular cells. For example, the endothelium releases cytokines and expresses adhesion molecules that recruit leukocytes, which is important in inflammation. The endothelium influences vascular muscle by regulating vascular tone and it also determines vascular permeability into the tissues— tight junctions between endothelial cells are pertinent in the blood brain barrier.

The endothelium secretes vasoconstrictive and vasodilative molecules that play a major role in controlling vascular tone and blood flow. Nitric oxide (NO) and prastacyclin are the main vasodilatory molecules and an impairment or reduction of the molecules activity and/or production is the main cause of endothelial dysfunction. In models of Ang II-dependent hypertension, endothelium-dependent vasodilation is reduced. Dysfunction of ion channels is also associated with impaired endothelial function.

=== Arterial stiffness ===
Arteries are blood vessels that carry blood away from the heart to other areas of the body. They are mainly responsible for transporting oxygen and nutrients to various parts of the body and removing carbon dioxide and wastes. Arteries are generally elastic, which allows them to bend and fit throughout the body and maintain a stable blood pressure. Arterial stiffness occurs as people age and increases the risk of stroke and cardiovascular diseases. Elastin and collagen are of the major determinants of arterial stiffness as well as matrix metalloproteases, advanced glycation endproducts (AGE), inflammation, neuroendocrine signaling, and genetics. The more stiff arteries are, the more pressure the heart needs to exert to pump blood throughout the body and therefore, the higher blood pressure a person has.

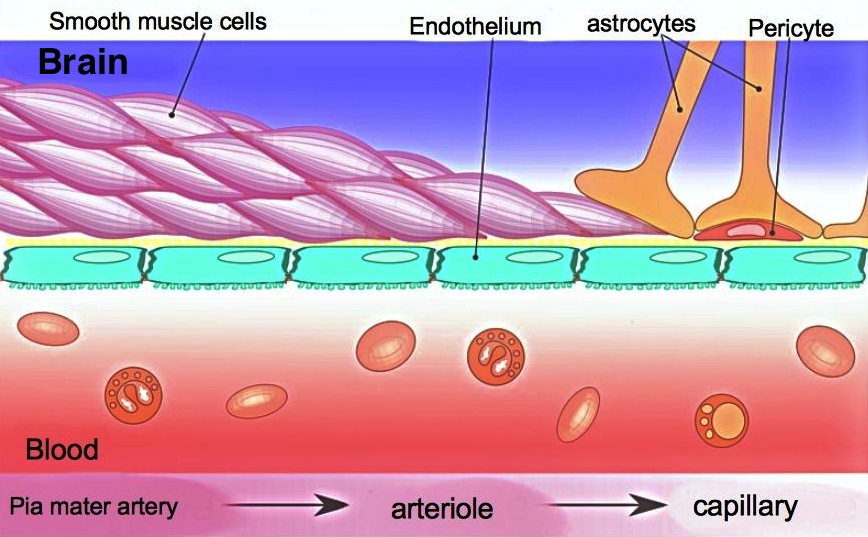
Blood brain barrier

=== Blood–brain barrier dysfunction ===
The blood–brain barrier (BBB) is essential in maintaining a homeostatic environment for neurons and glial cells by preventing solutes from diffusing into the brain interstitial space. The endothelial cells that makeup the BBB are different from those that make up the vasculature structurally, molecularly, and metabolically. They are connected by tight junctions, which further ensure that molecules do not freely pass through.

BBB disruption is associated with hypertension, cerebrovascular diseases, neurodegenerative diseases, and aging.

=== Inflammation ===
Inflammation can impair vascular function and therefore cause many of the pathophysiologies mentioned above. Hypertension is accompanied by peripheral inflammation, which can affect CNS function through activation of circumventricular organs (CVOs). Furthermore, Ang II also plays a role in the neural control of blood pressure through the activation of these CVOs. More recently, hypertension is recognized as an immune condition. Chronic inflammation, compromises the BBB, which in turn allows for molecules to leak into the CNS. This then activates astrocytes and microglia, causing an immune response within the brain. Neuroinflammation can reach regulatory centers of blood pressure such as the paraventricular nucleus (PVN), leading to enhanced sympathoexcitation, and ultimately to a sustained elevation of blood pressure. The most common neuroinflammatory markers are interleukin-6 (IL-6), interleukin-1β (IL-1β), and tumor necrosis factor-α (TNF-α).

=== Cerebral artery structure and function ===
Hypertension, mainly through Ang II, remodels vessel structure and function by increasing oxidative stress, vascular inflammation, and altering cerebral blood flow. Hypertension causes a reduction in the lumen diameter of cerebral arteries, which increases its vascular resistance. The brain receives around 15–20% of the total cardiac output and therefore, disruptions in this cerebral perfusion have damaging effects to proper neuronal function.

== Encephalopathies ==
=== Hypertension and stroke ===
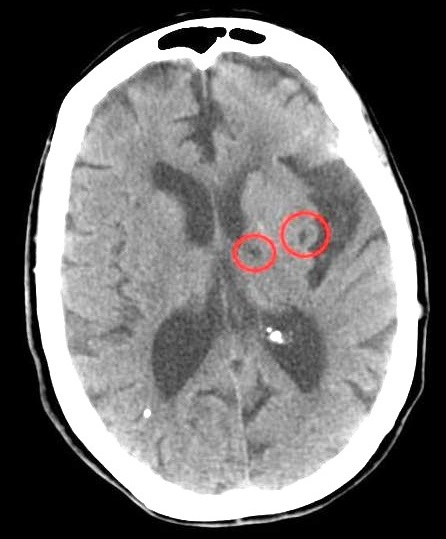
CT scan of two lacunar infarctions. Moments after an ischemic stroke, lesions are established that can be detected.

Hypertension is the leading cause of strokes and studies show that it increases the risk of a stroke by 220% and stroke is the leading cause of long-term disability. High blood pressure weakens arteries (small vessel disease) and causes blood vessels to be more likely to clog and/or burst. A lacunar infarction occurs when an artery is blocked and an intracerebral hemorrhage occurs when the blood vessels burst. In turn, the brain is more vulnerable to ischemic insults as there is a dysregulation in the supply of blood and oxygen. More specifically, hypertension inflicts damage to small resistance arteries, which supply nutrients to the internal capsule, brainstem, thalamus, cerebellum, and basal ganglia, and cause cell death and tissue degeneration. Blood clots also accelerate arterioscelerosis, which causes arteries to thicken and harden. Essentially, hypertension is the biggest risk factor for stroke and tissue damage caused by a stroke is a major risk factor for cognitive decline, therefore the risk of stroke may act as a mediator in the relationship between blood pressure and cognition. Besides lifestyle modifications, blood pressure control is the #1 treatment for stroke prevention. Antihypertensive medication show a protective effect against stroke-related cognitive impairments.

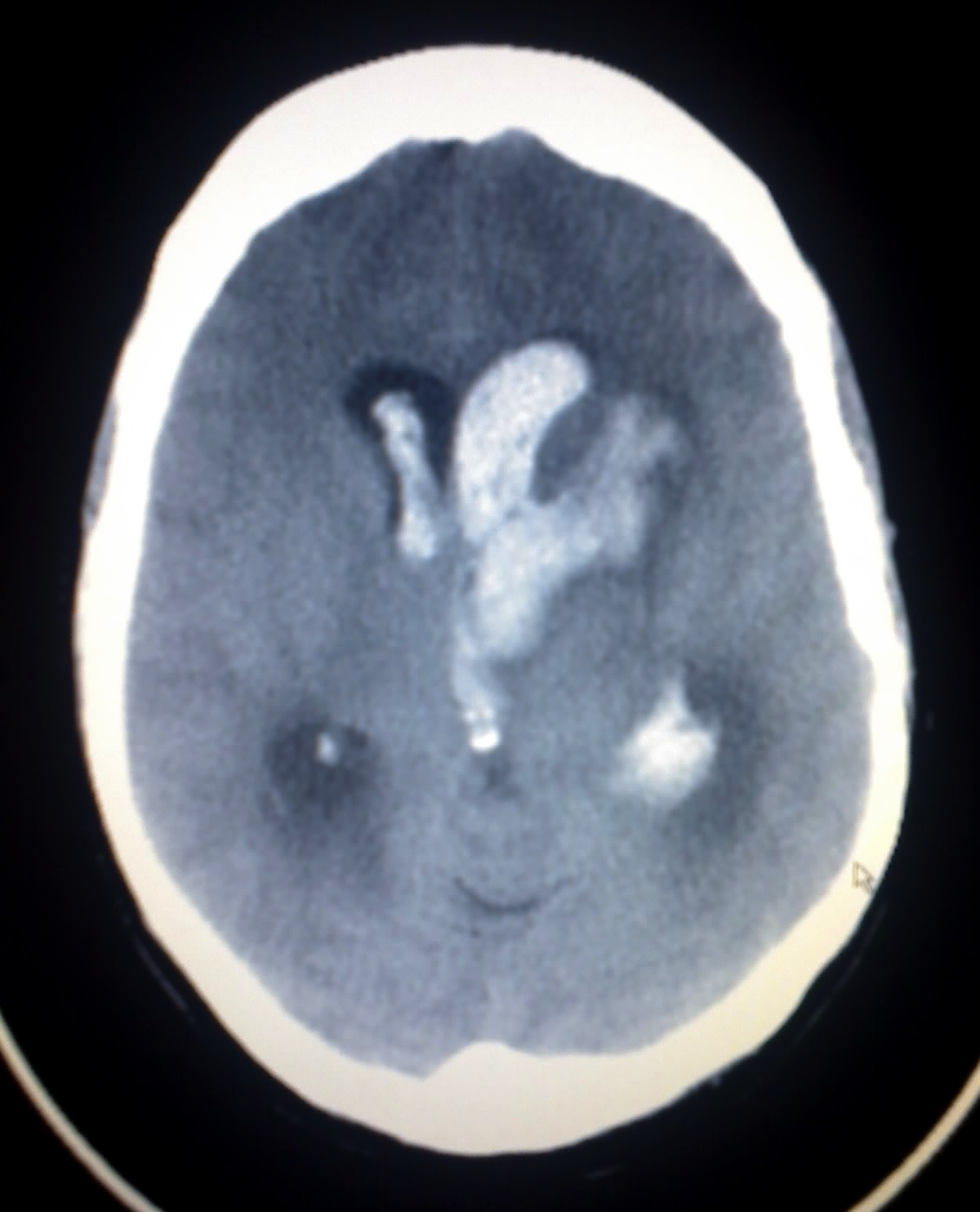
CT scan of intracerebral hemorrhage

Hypertension→ Small vessel disease → Lacunar infarction & Intracerebral hemorrhage → Tissue damage

=== Hypertension and vascular dementia ===
Vascular dementia develops as blood vessels in the brain become damaged, preventing brain cells from receiving the nutrients it needs to function. Hypertension alters the brain's vasculature via inadequate blood flow, leading to changes in the blood-brain barrier (BBB) and cerebral blood flow and ultimately, weakening brain structures and functions. Vascular dementia is characterized by ischemic infarcts, cerebral hemorrhages, white matter lesions, BBB dysfunction, and/or microvascular degeneration.

Multiple longitudinal and cross-sectional studies showed that hypertension is a prevalent risk factor of vascular dementia in participants ranging from 58~90 years old. Moreover, a meta-analysis on the longitudinal and cross-sectional studies showed that hypertensives are 59% more likely to develop vascular dementia compared to those that are normotensive.

=== Hypertension and Alzheimer's disease ===
Although there are no direct correlations with hypertension and its association with Alzheimer's disease, chronic hypertension is associated with white matter lesions, lacunar infarcts, neurotic plaques and neurofibrillary tangles, all pathological features of AD.

A 1993 Framingham study showed that untreated blood pressure is inversely related to cognitive function in stroke-free adults aged 55–88. Furthermore, a longitudinal clinical trial study paired with secondary data analysis from the Advanced Cognitive Training for Independent and Vital Elderly (ACTIVE) interventional trial revealed that hypertensives had a faster decrease in frontally-mediated cognitive functions such as reasoning abilities. Many studies show correlations with hypertension and cognitive decline however, some studies do not such as the Chicago Health and Aging Project, which states that blood pressure is not associated with cognitive function.

== Current treatments ==
=== Lifestyle modifications ===
- dietary changes (less salt, sugar, saturated fats and more fiber, fruits, vegetables)
- regular exercise
- smoking cessation
- reduction in alcohol consumption

Antihypertensive agents

=== Pharmacological intervention ===
Multiple studies suggest that hypertension is a prevailing factor in the development and progression of age-related cognitive decline and that antihypertensive approaches could help control or relieve the impact of hypertension on cognition.

A meta-analysis of randomized controlled studies from 1970 to 2012 showed that lowering blood pressure via antihypertensive medications is associated with a reduction in heart failure and stroke risk. Additionally, an Epidemiology of Vascular Aging (EVA) study showed that participants with high blood pressure exhibited 4 points lower on the Mini-Mental State Evaluation (MMSE) which correlates to these participants being 4.3 times more likely to exhibit cognitive decline and that the risk decreased to 1.9 times in those taking antihypertensive medication. However, it is still up to debate on whether antihypertensive medications have an impact on cognitive decline. A randomized double blind study by the Systolic Hypertension Study in Europe revealed that the incidence of dementia was lowered by 50% in participants that were given pharmacological intervention for hypertension after 2 years and that there was a 55% decrease in the individuals developing Alzheimer's disease and vascular dementia. The pharmacological drugs included nitrendipine (calcium-channel blocker), enalapril (ACE inhibitor), and hydrochlorothiazide (diuretic). Various studies looking at different classes of antihypertensive medication including ARBs, beta-blockers, diuretics, and ACE inhibitors, reveal that pharmacological treatments have overall cerebroprotective effects however, the effects vary depending on drug class and its mechanisms.

==== Angiotensin-converting enzyme inhibitors ====
Angiotensin-converting enzyme (ACE) inhibitors essentially block the conversion of Ang I to Ang II. They cause relaxation of the blood vessels as there are less Ang II molecules (vasoconstrictor) circulating, increase natriuresis, decrease blood volume, all of which culminate in lowering blood pressure. Enalapril, Benazepril, Perindopril, and Ramipril are among commonly prescribed ACE inhibitors clinically.

==== Angiotensin receptor blockers ====
Angiotensin receptor blockers (ARBs) antagonize the action of Ang II by binding and inhibiting angiotensin II type 1 receptor. In doing so, ARBs block vasoconstriction, promote natriuresis, and reduce oxidative stress. Studies show that the vasodilator ability of vessels are impaired in hypertensives which causes brain perfusion to decrease significantly, influencing cognitive function. ACEs and ARBs improve cerebral perfusion in hypertensive patients. Losartan, Irbesartan, Valsartan, Olmesartan, and Azilsartan, are common ARBs that are clinically available.

==== Angiotensin type 2 receptor agonists ====
AT2R agonists cause vasodilation, exerting hypotensive effects. In animal models of ischemia, activation of AT2R is protective as it reduces the infarct area by increasing cerebral perfusion, decreases superoxide production, and promotes neuronal cell differentiation and neuritis growth, which all come together to reduce axonal degeneration and inflammation.

Beta-blockers

==== Beta-blockers ====
Beta-blockers are competitive antagonists of the adrenergic beta receptor, blocking the binding sites of epinephrine and norepinephrine. They lower blood pressure by a RAAS independent mechanism, reducing plasma renin activity and Ang II levels. Propranolol, Atenolol, Bupranolol, Timolol, are some examples of clinically available beta-blockers.
