= Felix Jackson =

German-born American screenwriter and film producer

- Born: Felix Raphael Joachimson; June 5, 1902; Hamburg, German Empire
- Died: December 4, 1993 (aged 91); Los Angeles, California, U.S.
- Other name: Felix Joachimson
- Occupations: Screenwriter, film producer
- Spouse(s): Ellen Levy (19? – 192?) divorced one son Ralph Jackson (formerly Joachimson); Licci Balla (?–1940; divorced); Jill Jackson (1940–44; divorced; 2 children); Deanna Durbin (1945–49; divorced; 1 child); Ilka (?–1992; his death) one son

Felix Jackson (born Felix Raphael Joachimson; June 5, 1902 – December 4, 1992) was a German-born American screenwriter and film and television producer.

== Biography ==
Jackson was born in Hamburg. He was a city editor in Germany at 21, then a dramatic and music critic, and helped manage three theaters in Berlin. He joined Joe Pasternak as a producer in Budapest in 1933. He began working in the German film industry, before relocating after the rise of the Nazi party. He moved to Austria and Hungary in the mid-1930s where he frequently collaborated with the director Henry Koster. His screenplay for the 1935 film Little Mother served as the basis for a Hollywood remake Bachelor Mother (1939) which was nominated for an Academy Award.

Jackson moved to Hollywood in the late 1930s, writing the screenplay for Destry Rides Again (1939) a western starring James Stewart and Marlene Dietrich. Naturalised U.S. citizen December 13, 1940, he was active in the European Film Fund, which provided support to European emigre filmmakers. He produced several Deanna Durbin films for Universal Pictures and they married in 1945.

In November 1946 he asked for and received his release from Universal.

In January 1947 Durbin earned $310,728 for the previous year and Jackson earned $114,875. In January 1948 their lawyer announced the couple had come to "a friendly parting of the ways". In September 1949 she filed for divorce. It was revealed that she and Jackson only lived together for 19 months (they married in June 1945 and she claimed he left her to go live in New York in January 1947). Jackson had been divorced in 1944, 1942 and in Europe.

He joined the advertising agency Young and Rubicam in 1946, heading its dramatic-television department. He served as executive producer of Pulitzer Prize Playhouse which aired on the ABC television network.

In his fifties, Felix Jackson published a few novels.

== Selected filmography ==
=== Screenwriter ===
- No More Love (1931)
- Five of the Jazz Band (1932)
- How Shall I Tell My Husband? (1932)
- Love at First Sight (1932)
- Das häßliche Mädchen (1933)
- Laughing Heirs (1933)
- Peter (1934)
- A Precocious Girl (1934)
- Four and a Half Musketeers (1935)
- Little Mother (1935)
- Catherine the Last (1936)
- Bubi (1937)
- Mad About Music (1938)
- The Rage of Paris (1938)
- The Girl Downstairs (1938)
- Three Smart Girls Grow Up (1939)
- Bachelor Mother (1939)
- Destry Rides Again (1939)
- Spring Parade (1940)
- Appointment for Love (1941)
- Back Street (1941)
- I'll Be Yours (1947)

=== Producer ===
- Hers to Hold (1943)
- His Butler's Sister (1943)
- Christmas Holiday (1944)
- Sensations of 1945 (1944)
- Lady on a Train (1945)
- Because of Him (1946)

== Novels ==
- So Help Me God (1955)
- Maestro (1957).

== Bibliography ==
- Bach, Stephen. Marlene Dietrich: Life and Legend. University of Minnesota Press, 2011.
