= Das Dreimäderlhaus (disambiguation) =

Das Dreimäderlhaus is a Viennese operetta based on the 1912 Rudolf Hans Bartsch novel Schwammerl.

Das Dreimäderlhaus may also refer to the following adaptations:

- The House of Three Girls (1918 film) (German: Das Dreimäderlhaus), a German silent film directed by Richard Oswald
- Blossom Time (1934 film), British film directed by Paul L. Stein
- Three Girls for Schubert (Drei Mäderl um Schubert), 1936 German film directed by E.W. Emo
- The House of Three Girls (1958 film) (German: Das Dreimäderlhaus), an Austrian-West German musical film directed by Ernst Marischka

== See also ==
- Lilac Time (disambiguation)
