= The House of Three Girls =

The House of Three Girls may refer to:

- The House of Three Girls (1918 film), a German silent film
- The House of Three Girls (1958 film), an Austrian-West German musical film

== See also ==
- Das Dreimäderlhaus (disambiguation)
