= Blossom Time =

Blossom Time may refer to:

- Blossom Time (operetta), a 1921 English-language adaptation of the operetta Das Dreimäderlhaus
- Blossom Time (1934 film), a British musical drama film, based on the operetta Das Dreimäderlhaus
- Blossom Time (1940 film), a Swedish drama film

== See also ==
- Das Dreimäderlhaus (disambiguation)
- Blossom Time at Ronnie Scott's, a 1966 live album by Blossom Dearie
