= Baron Franz von der Trenck =

Austrian soldier (1711–1749)

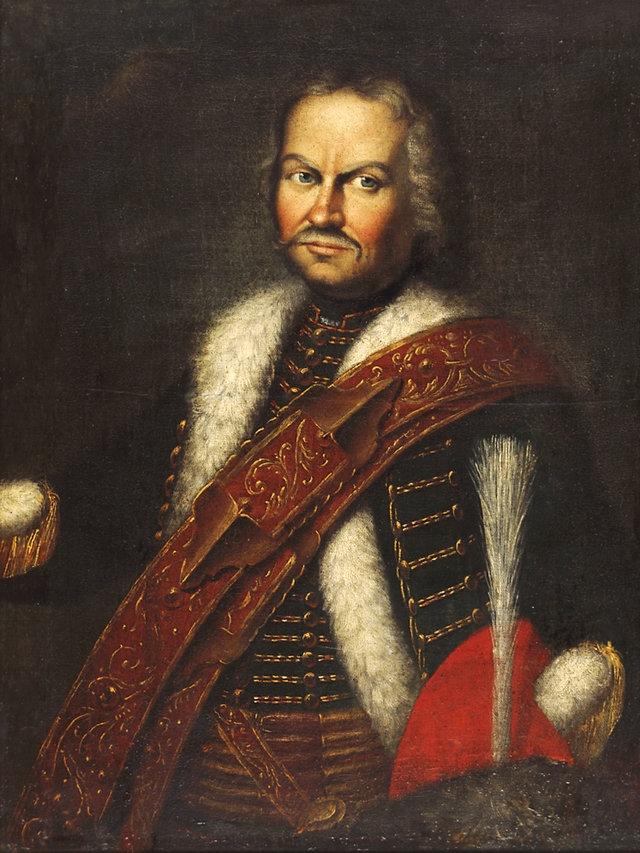
- Baron Franz von der Trenck
- Born: February 1, 1711; Reggio di Calabria, Kingdom of Naples
- Died: October 4, 1749 (aged 38); Brno, Moravia
- Military career
- Allegiance: Habsburg monarchy

Baron Franz von der Trenck (German: Freiherr Franz von der Trenck; Croatian: Barun Franjo Trenk; Reggio di Calabria. January 1, 1711 – Brno. October 4, 1749) was a Croatian baron and Habsburg nobleman and soldier, leader and commander of pandurs in the War of the Austrian Succession (1740–1748), with whom he fought in Silesia, Bavaria, Austria and Bohemia.

He remained known for alleged atrocities committed by his troups, as claimed by some historical sources, while other sources mentioned bravery of the pandur troops.

== Early life ==
Trenck was born on 1 January 1711 in Reggio in the Kingdom of Naples, where his father Johann Heinrich von der Trenck, a member of a military noble family that originated in Pomerania, served as an Austrian officer. By birth, Trenck was a Prussian, but he was an Austrian subject with large estates in Croatia, more precisely Slavonia. He spent his childhood mostly in the Kingdom of Naples, Slavonia, and the Kingdom of Hungary, which was not unusual since his father's job required frequent relocation. He was educated by the Jesuits at Sopron (Ödenburg) and Požega.

== Military career ==
Trenck entered the Imperial Army in 1728 and was flagbearer in Székesfehérvár and Osijek until 1731, when he decided to resign and went to live in Slavonian city of Požega. He married and lived on his estate for a few years with wife and four children. Upon the death of his wife and children who had perished in the Great Plague of 1738, he offered to raise an irregular corps of pandurs for service against the Turks, but this offer was refused, after which he entered the Imperial Russian Army as a mercenary, going with around 300 soldiers to Kyiv via Poland. In Russia, he met and befriended Ernst Gideon von Laudon. However, after serving against the Turks and Tatars during the Russo-Turkish War for a short time as captain and major of cavalry, he was accused of bad conduct, brutality, and disobedience and condemned to death. Despite showing insubordination, he had gained popularity for defying an order to retreat. His sentence was commuted by Field Marshal Münnich to degradation and imprisonment.

After a time Trenck returned to Austria, where his father was governor of a small fortress, but there he came into conflict and took sanctuary in a convent in Vienna. Prince Charles Alexander of Lorraine obtained for him an amnesty and a commission in a corps of irregulars. In this command, he displayed personal bravery, and in spite of the general dislike, his services were so valuable that he was promoted to lieutenant colonel (1743) and colonel (1744).

In December 1742, he returned to Slavonia and after his father's death (1743) he inherited all the property (Brestovac, Pleternica, Pakrac), and he also bought Velika and Nuštar. He soon returned to the battlefield with the pandurs, whom he reorganized into a regular regiment in Vienna in 1744. He distinguished himself in battles on the Rhine, during the capture of České Budějovice, and in the Battle of Kolín in Bohemia. In December 1745, he returned to Slavonia with the rank of colonel.

Trenck earned most of his fame during the War of the Austrian Succession, as the leader and commander of a unit of pandurs, or paramilitary troops in the Imperial Army, which specialized in frontier warfare, guerrilla tactics, and surprise hit-and-run actions, into which he recruited mostly Croatian mercenaries, experienced fighters from the Austro-Ottoman Military Frontier. Trenck's Pandurs soon became infamous for both braveries and the alleged atrocities they committed. Croatian Encyclopedia states:

Word of his pandurs heroism spread, but so did fear of their violence—a sentiment fueled by their Ottoman-style attire, shaved heads with queues, horse-tail standards instead of flags, and the so-called "Turkish band", composed of twelve musicians playing drums and flutes. (...) He survived 102 duels and was wounded 14 times. During his lifetime, he made many enemies who accused him of ruthless warfare, the embezzlement of state funds, plotting an uprising in Slavonia, and numerous other misdeeds. Although a trial in Vienna revealed the accusations against him to be groundless, his unruly behavior during the proceedings led to his sentencing in 1747 to the loss of his rank and life imprisonment, while his vast estates were forfeited to the Court Chamber.

When the War of the Austrian Succession broke out Trenck rallied volunteers and marched for Vienna to assist Maria Theresa. While in Vienna, Trenck's Pandurs marched the streets before invading Prussia. At the Battle of Soor, he and his irregulars allegedly plundered when they should have been fighting and Trenck was accused of having allowed King Frederick the Great himself to escape.

== Imprisonment and death ==
After a time he was brought before a court-martial in Vienna, he was accused of having sold and withdrawn commissions to his officers without the permission of the empress, having punished his men without heed of the military code, having drawn pay and allowance for fictitious men, planning uprising in Slavonia, among others. Although the court proceedings in Vienna didn't found that the accusations against him were founded, due to his unbridled behavior during the trial, he was nonetheless sentenced in 1747 to the loss of his rank and life imprisonment, while his estates reverted to the Court Chamber. During his trial, Trenk wrote an autobiography. He spent the rest of his life in captivity in the fortress of Spielberg (Czech: Špilberk) in Brno, where he died on October 4, 1749. In his last will, he left the sum of 30,000 florins to the small town of Marienburg.

Trenck's mummified remains can presently be seen on display in the crypt of Brno's Capuchin Monastery.

== Notes ==
- Franz is the first cousin of Friedrich Freiherr von der Trenck, who was serving in the Prussian Army. During the wars in Silesia, they were on different sides and Friedrich was imprisoned out of alleged conspiracy with Franz.
- Mark Twain included Baron Trenck in an ironic list of Tom Sawyer's "heroes" in Adventures of Huckleberry Finn.
- His story was the basis for the 1908 operetta Baron Trenck by Felix Albini, Alfred Maria Willner, and Robert Bodanzky.
