= The Count of Luxemburg (disambiguation) =

The Count of Luxembourg is an operetta. It may also refer to:

- The Count of Luxemburg (1957 film), a German film
- The Count of Luxemburg (1972 film), a German film
