= The House of Three Girls (1958 film) =

1958 film

- Directed by: Ernst Marischka
- Written by: Heinrich Berte; Ernst Marischka; Heinz Reichert (libretto); A. M. Willner (libretto); Rudolf Hans Bartsch (novel Schwammerl)
- Produced by: Karl Ehrlich; Ernst Marischka
- Starring: Karlheinz Böhm; Rudolf Schock; Magda Schneider
- Cinematography: Bruno Mondi
- Edited by: Alfred Srp
- Music by: Anton Profes; Franz Schubert
- Production company: Aspa Films
- Distributed by: UFA Film Hansa
- Release date: 18 December 1958
- Running time: 102 minutes
- Countries: Austria; West Germany
- Language: German

The House of Three Girls (German: Das Dreimäderlhaus) is a 1958 Austrian-West German musical film directed by Ernst Marischka and starring Karlheinz Böhm, Rudolf Schock and Magda Schneider. It is based on the operetta Das Dreimäderlhaus. The story had previously been made into the film Three Girls for Schubert in 1936.

The film's sets were designed by the art director Fritz Jüptner-Jonstorff.

== Cast ==
- Karlheinz Böhm as Franz Schubert
- Rudolf Schock as Franz von Schober
- Magda Schneider as Frau Tschöll
- Gustav Knuth as Christian Tschöll
- Johanna Matz as Hannerl
- Richard Romanowsky as Diabelli
- Erich Kunz as Johann Mayrhofer
- Helga Neuner as Heiderl
- Gerda Siegl as Hederl
- Eberhard Wächter as J.M. Vogl - Hofopernsänger
- Helmuth Lohner as Moritz von Schwind
- Albert Rueprecht as Leopold Kupelwieser
- Lotte Lang as Kathi
- Else Rambausek as Mrs. Prametzberger
- Edith Elmay as Franzi Seidl
- Daniela Sigell
- Brigitte Jonak
- Ewald Balser as Ludwig van Beethoven
- Liselotte Bav as Therese Pichler

== See also ==
- The House of Three Girls (1918)
- Blossom Time (1934)
- Three Girls for Schubert (1936)

== Bibliography ==
- Bock, Hans-Michael & Bergfelder, Tim. The Concise CineGraph. Encyclopedia of German Cinema. Berghahn Books, 2009.
