= Der Graf von Luxemburg =

Opera by Franz Lehár

- Operetta by Franz Lehár
- Wedding of Count René and Angèle, 1912 French vocal score
- Librettist: Alfred Willner; Robert Bodanzky; Leo Stein
- Language: German
- Premiere: 12 November 1909; Theater an der Wien, Vienna

Der Graf von Luxemburg (The Count of Luxembourg) is an operetta in three acts by Franz Lehár to a German libretto by Alfred Willner, Robert Bodanzky, and Leo Stein. A Viennese take on bohemian life in Paris at the beginning of the 20th century, the story revolves around an impoverished aristocrat and a glamorous opera singer who have entered into a sham marriage without ever seeing each other and later fall in love at first sight, unaware that they are already husband and wife.

It premiered at the Theater an der Wien, in Vienna, on 12 November 1909 and was an immediate success, being revived in Germany and translated into other languages for successful foreign productions including in France as Le comte de Luxembourg and in English-speaking countries as The Count of Luxembourg. It has remained in the repertory until the present day, especially in German-speaking countries, and several film and stage adaptations have been produced. The piece was recorded with the original Viennese cast and has since been recorded in several languages.

== Background ==
Lehár composed Der Graf von Luxemburg in only three weeks and in a private remark before its premiere called it "Sloppy work, completely worthless!" However, it became his first major international success after The Merry Widow. Between those operettas, he had composed two one-act stage works, Peter und Paul reisen ins Schlaraffenland (Peter and Paul Travel to Paradise) and Mitislaw der Moderne (Fashionable Mitislaw), followed by his indifferently received three-act operetta Der Mann mit den drei Frauen (The Man with Three Wives) in 1908 and the somewhat more successful Das Fürstenkind (Maids of Athens) which premiered in October 1909, one month before Der Graf von Luxemburg.

Like The Merry Widow, Der Graf von Luxemburg deals with the themes of how the promise of wealth affects love and marriage, and the contrast between the gaiety of Parisian society and Slavic seriousness. The libretto was written by Alfred Maria Willner, Robert Bodanzky and Leo Stein. Stein had previously worked with Lehár on his 1904 Der Göttergatte, and Bodanzky had co-authored the librettos for both Peter und Paul reisen ins Schlaraffenland and Mitislaw der Moderne. The libretto for Der Graf von Luxemburg was not completely new. It was a re-working of the one written by Alfred Willner and Bernhard Buchbinder twelve years earlier for Johann Strauss' unsuccessful operetta Die Göttin der Vernunft (The Goddess of Reason).

== Roles ==
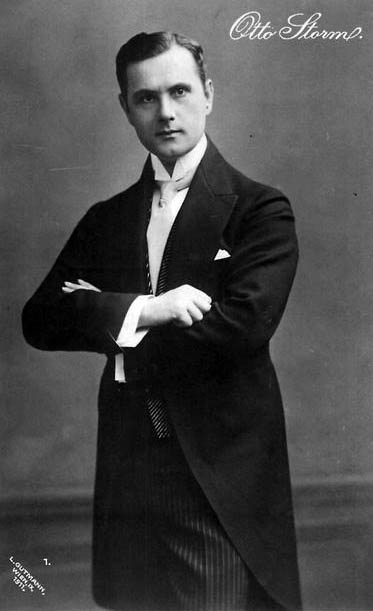
Otto Storm who sang the title role at its world premiere

Roles, voice types, premiere cast
Role	Voice type	Premiere cast, 12 November 1909 Conductor: Robert Stolz
Angèle Didier, a singer at the Paris Opera	soprano	Annie von Ligety
Armand Brissard, an artist	tenor	Bernhard Bötel
Juliette Vermont, a dancer and Brissard's girlfriend	soprano	Louise Kartousch
Prince Basil Basilowitsch, in love with Angèle	tenor	Max Pallenberg
Countess Stasa Kokozow, Prince Basil's former fiancée	mezzo-soprano	
Pawel von Pawlowitsch, Counsellor at the Russian embassy	tenor	
Pélégrin, a French registrar	baritone	
René, Graf von Luxemburg	tenor or high baritone	Otto Storm
Sergei Mentschikoff, a Russian notary	tenor	
Artists, grisettes, party guests, hotel personnel, Parisian socialites

== Synopsis ==
Setting: Paris, around 1900

=== Act 1 ===
It is the height of the Mardi Gras season in Paris. René, the impoverished but debonair Count of Luxemburg, is sharing a garret in Montmartre with his artist friend, Armand Brissard, who is in turn in love with Juliette Vermont, a dancer and the model for his latest painting. Meanwhile, a middle-aged Russian prince, Basil Basilowitsch, is infatuated with the young opera singer, Angèle Didier. However, he cannot marry her because she is a commoner. He offers René 500,000 francs to enter into a sham marriage with Angèle and then divorce her three months later. With title of "Countess", Angèle can then marry Prince Basilowitsch. (Attracted by the idea of eventually becoming a princess, Angèle had agreed to the plan.) The wedding takes place in Armand's studio. To ensure that no romantic complications develop, the couple are never to meet face-to-face. René promises to disappear for the next three months and a screen made from one of Armand's easels separates René and his "bride" during the ceremony. Alone after the ceremony, René looks forward to resuming his playboy lifestyle with his new-found wealth but at the same time is disturbed by the attraction he felt when he touched the unknown woman's hand through the screen.

=== Act 2 ===
A party is taking place at Angèle's house on the eve of her impending divorce from René. Three months have passed during which time René has been travelling with Armand. However, on his return René has seen Angèle perform at the Paris Opera and is deeply attracted to her. Determined to meet the singer, he and Armand attend her party, with René presenting himself as "Baron von Reval". The two fall in love, not knowing that they are already married to each other. Angèle tells René of the impossibility of their love as she is about to be divorced from one man and is engaged to marry another. Prince Basilowitsch is also at the party, and alarmed at the turn of events, publicly announces his engagement to Angèle. René and Angèle now realize the true situation, but René has no money to buy himself out of the contract, having already squandered much of the 500,000 francs he had received from the prince.

=== Act 3 ===
The next day in the lounge of the Grand Hotel where René has been staying since his return to Paris, he and Angèle discuss their predicament. They are joined by Countess Kokozow, Prince Basil's former fiancée. Prince Basil stumbles into her arms in a frantic search for Angèle only to hear that the Tsar has ordered him to keep his promise and marry the countess instead. René learns that his confiscated properties have been returned to him. He is now a rich man, can repay the prince, and stay married to Angèle with his honour intact. Armand and Juliette, whose relationship has often been tempestuous, arrive and announce that they too have finally decided to marry.

Cover of the vocal score for the Spanish version

== Performance history ==
Der Graf von Luxemburg premiered at the Theater an der Wien, Vienna, on 12 November 1909. Otto Storm played René, and Angèle was played by Annie von Ligety who was making her stage debut. It also proved to be the only role she would play—shortly thereafter she married a wealthy financier and retired from the stage. A great success, Der Graf initially ran for 299 performances. Lehár made various changes to the work over the ensuing years, and the version now preferred, with the first act divided into two scenes and a solo song added for Countess Kokozow in Act 3, originates from the production in Berlin at the Theater des Volkes on 4 March 1937.

Annie von Ligety who sang the role of Angèle in the world premiere

Following its Vienna premiere, Der Graf von Luxemburg was soon performed internationally. It premiered in Germany at Berlin's Neues Operettenhaus on 23 December 1909 and in Hungary a month later as Luxemburg grófja with the libretto translated into Hungarian and adapted by Andor Gábor. When performed outside German-speaking countries the operetta was almost invariably performed in translation, often with the libretto significantly adapted to local theatrical tastes. It was first performed in Italy as Il conte di Lussemburgo at the Teatro Vittorio Emanuele in Turin in 1910, and in France as Le comte de Luxembourg (in a translation by Robert de Flers and Gaston de Caillavet) at the Théâtre Apollo in 1912. The Spanish version premiered at the Teatro Eslava in Madrid as El conde le Luxemburgo in 1910. However, this version was significantly altered from the original. The libretto was adapted and translated by José Juan Cadenas, and the Spanish composer Vicente Lleó Balbastre not only rearranged Lehár's music but also added some music of his own. A year later, Lleó collaborated with the composer Enrique Bru and two new librettists to create a one-act zarzuela, El conde del embudo, even more loosely based on Lehár's original. Der Graf von Luxemburg arrived in Latin America soon after its premiere thanks to travelling operetta companies from Europe. It received its Uruguayan premiere in 1910 at the Teatro Solis in Montevideo performed in the original German and was subsequently performed there for many years, although after the premiere always in either Italian or Spanish translation. A Portuguese company from Porto performed the work in Portuguese translation as O conde de Luxemburgo at the Teatro Amazonas in Brazil in 1913.

One of the most successful adaptations of the operetta was The Count of Luxembourg, an English version by Basil Hood and Adrian Ross who had previously adapted The Merry Widow for English audiences. The Hood and Ross version premiered in London on 20 May 1911 with Lehár conducting and King George V and Queen Mary in the audience. It was followed by a Broadway production in 1912. Hood and Ross had made significant alterations to the original libretto and reduced the work from three acts to two with Lehár adjusting the score accordingly. However, in 1983, the New Sadler's Wells Opera (which closed in 1989) performed the work in a new translation of the libretto by Nigel Douglas with song texts by Eric Maschwitz and Douglas. This version in three acts was much more faithful to the original and also included music from Lehár's 1937 definitive version.

The KlangBogen Wien Festival commissioned Austrian film and theatre director Michael Schottenberg to rewrite the operetta's book for its performance at the 2005 festival. Although Schottenberg's re-working remains faithful to the basic plot and retains most of the original dialogue, the setting was changed to Vienna in the 1950s. The Graf von Luxemburg is now René Graf, a struggling novelist whose nickname is "The Count". His bohemian friend Manfred (Armand in the original) is a student, while their beloveds, Angelika (Angèle) and Julie (Juliette), are dancers in a sleazy Hawaiian revue. Prince Basilowitsch is now Dr. Basil Basilovich-Kokosov, the Russian consul to Vienna, who is saddled with an estranged nymphomaniac wife, Anastasia. René and Angelika's sham wedding takes place in Manfred's bathroom, with René hiding behind the shower curtain. Larry L. Lash, who reviewed the live performance for Opera News wrote that the production "zipped along with a manic 'Springtime for Hitler' fall-out-of-your-seat humor that had me laughing out loud for days after." Immediately following the festival performances at the Theater an der Wien, Schottenberg's production transferred to the Vienna Volksoper where it remained in repertory as of 2011.

== Musical numbers ==
Postcard illustrating Armand and Juliette's act 2 duet "Mädel klein, Mädel fein"

Act 1

1. "Karneval! Ja du allerschönste Zeit"
2. "Mein Ahnherr war der Luxemburg"
3. "Ein Stübchen so klein"
4. "Pierre, der schreibt an klein Fleurette"
5. "Ich bin verliebt, ich muß es ja gestehen"
6. "Ein Scheck auf die englische Bank"
7. "Heut' noch werd' ich Ehefrau – Unbekannt, deshalb nicht minder interessant"
8. "Frau Gräfin, Sie erlauben wohl – Sie geht links, er geht rechts – Sah nur die kleine Hand"

Act 2

9. "Hoch, Evoe, Angèle Didier – Ich dank, meine Herren und meine Damen"
10. "Sind Sie von Sinnen, Herr Baron – Lieber Freund, man greift nicht nach den Sternen – Bist du's, lachendes Glück"
11. "Schau'n Sie freundlichst mich an – Bitte gleich, bitte sehr – Mädel klein, Mädel fein"
12. "Ach, seh'n Sie doch, er ist ganz blaß"
13. "Der Handschuh, wie pikant – Es duftet nah Trèfle incarnat"
14. "Ein Löwe war ich im Salon – Polkatänzer, Polkatänzer"

Act 3

15. "Was ist das für'ne Zeit, liebe Leute"
16. "Wärst du heut' schon mein Mann"
17. "Packt die Liebe einen Alten justament beim Schopf"
18. "Es duftet nach Trèfle incarnat – Was ich im Traum nur ersah"
19. "Wir bummeln durch's Leben Reinhören Reinhören"

== Recordings ==
In 1909, Deutsche Grammophon released excerpts from Der Graf von Luxemburg on nine 78 rpm records, recorded by the original cast and conducted by Lehár himself. Since that time, there have been many recordings of the operetta (or its highlights) in its original German, as well as recordings of Russian, Spanish, Hungarian, English, and French versions. The English recording, conducted by Barry Wordsworth and released on the That's Entertainment label, was from the 1983 Sadler's Wells Opera production and features the original cast from those performances including Marilyn Hill Smith as Angèle and Neil Jenkins as René. Amongst the recordings of the French version are Decca's 1950s release with Gabriel Bacquier in the title role and EMI Pathé's 1960s highlights with Michel Dens as the Count.

Vocal score for the Hungarian version

Late 20th and early 21st century full length recordings of the Der Graf von Luxemburg in the original German include:

- 1968: Nicolai Gedda (René), Lucia Popp (Angèle), Renate Holm (Juliette), Willi Brokmeier (Armand), Kurt Böhme (Prince Basil), Gisela Litz (Countess Kokozow); Graunke Symphony Orchestra and Bavarian State Opera chorus, conducted by Willy Mattes; EMI 65375 (CD)
- 2005: Bo Skovhus (René), Juliane Banse (Angèle), Gabriele Bone (Juliette), Rainer Trost (Armand), Andreas Conrad (Prince Basil), Eva Maria Marold (Countess Kokozow); Vienna Radio Symphony Orchestra and Festival-Chor KlangBogen Wien, conducted by Alfred Eschwé; CPO 7771942 (DVD)
- 2006: Michael Suttner (René), Ruth Ingeborg Ohlmann (Angèle), Ana-Maria Labin (Juliette), Marko Kathol (Armand), Alfred Sramek (Prince Basil), Marika Lichter (Countess Kokozow); Seefestspiele Mörbisch Orchestra and Choir, conducted by Rudolph Bibl; Oehms Classics, OC 570 (CD) ORF (DVD)

== Films ==
Der Graf von Luxemburg was filmed in 1957, The Count of Luxemburg, (directed by Werner Jacobs, with Gerhard Riedmann and Renate Holm) and again in 1972, The Count of Luxemburg, (directed by Wolfgang Glück, with Eberhard Wächter, Lilian Sukis and Erich Kunz).

There were also three silent films based on the operetta, the 1911 Brazilian film O Conde de Luxemburgo (directed by Alberto Botelho and produced by William Auler), the 1918 Hungarian film Luxemburg grófja (directed by Antal Forgács and produced by the Gloria film company) and the 1926 American film The Count of Luxembourg starring George Walsh (directed by Arthur Gregor and produced by Chadwick Pictures).
