= Baron Trenck =

1908 comic opera in three acts composed by Felix Albini

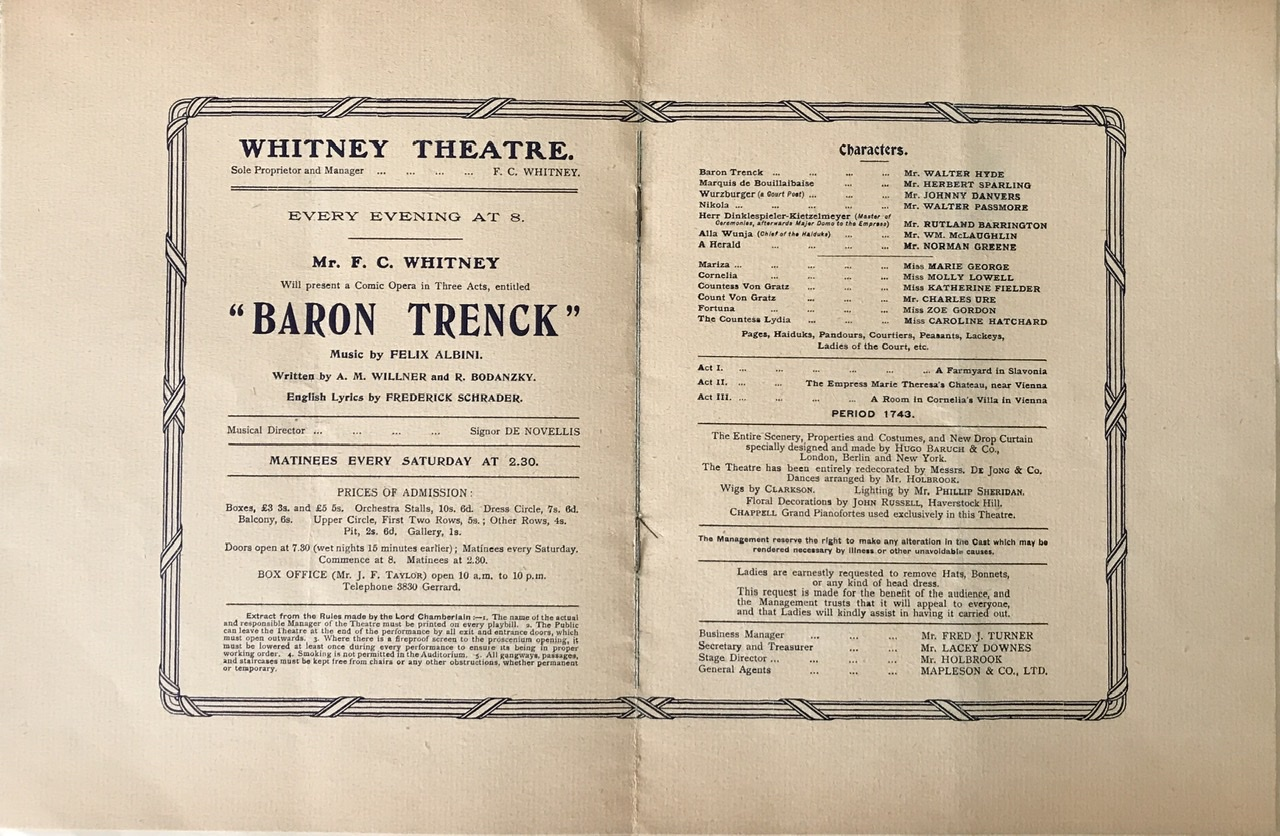
Programme from the London production of Baron Trenck (1911)

Baron Trenck is a comic opera in three acts loosely based on the life of Baron Franz von der Trenck. The original German-language work was composed by Felix Albini to a libretto by Alfred Maria Willner and Robert Bodanzky and premiered at the Stadttheater in Leipzig in 1908. The English version, adapted by Frederick Franklin Schrader and Henry Blossom, ran for just 43 performances at the Strand Theatre in London in 1911. It starred Walter Passmore, Walter Hyde and Caroline Hatchard.

== Production ==
Based on a 1908 German work of the same name first performed at the Stadttheater in Leipzig, Baron Trenck ran at the Whitney Theatre (Novello Theatre|Strand Theatre) from 22 April 22nd to 3 June 1911. The original score was by Felix Albini with additional music by Alfred G. Robyn to a book and lyrics by Alfred Maria Willner and Robert Bodanzky. The English version was adapted by Frederick Franklin Schrader and Henry Blossom, while the director and choreographer was Al Holbrook and the musical director was Antonio de Novellis.

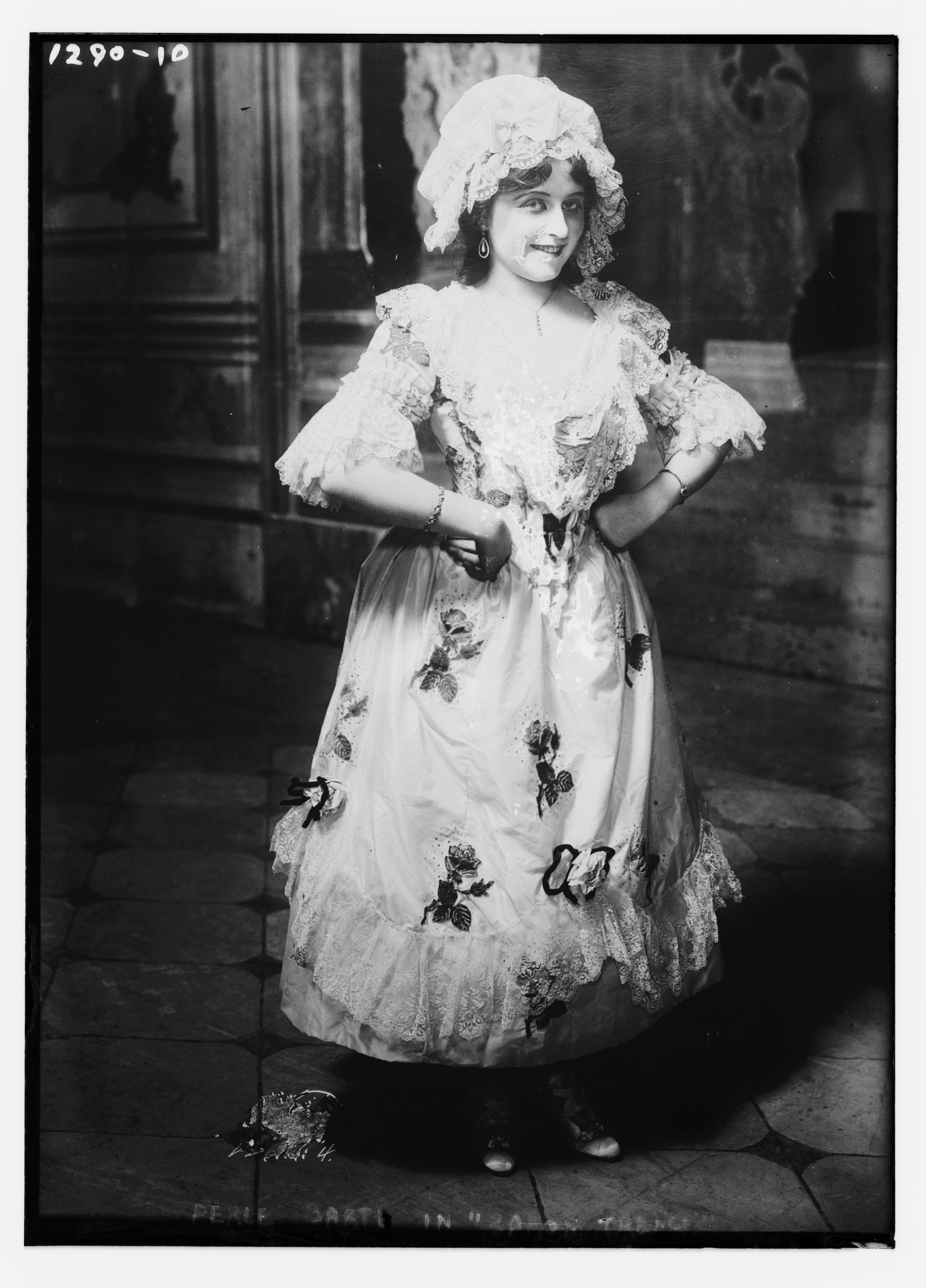
Perle Barti in Baron Trenck, New York

When Fred Whitney took over the lease of the Waldorf/Strand Theatre he chose to rename it the Whitney, opening his first season with Baron Trenck. The opening night audience were not enthusiastic with some booing during the third act at what The Stage called the "weak, heavy and uninteresting" book. However, The Stage praised the music and the general performance with The Times writing that Walter Hyde performed "heroically". Caroline Hatchard was "a bewitching Countess Lydia, at her wit's end over the constant dallying of her rapscallion lover, Trenck ... she acts interestingly, but her voice, admirably and so easily used by turns for comedy, tenderness and passion, would win its way anywhere."

Various cut and alterations were made in an attempt to improve the show but despite these it ran for just 43 performances. The Broadway production opened at the Casino Theatre in New York from 11 March to 13 April 1912 where it did even less well – running for just 40 performances.

== Synopsis ==
The story is loosely based on the life of Baron Franz von der Trenck. The comic opera is set in Austria in 1743 during the reign of Marie Therese of Austria. Two of Baron Trenck's tenants, Nikola and Mariza, have avoided the Baron's seigniorial rights (in this sanitized version the Baron has the right to kiss the bride), by getting married without his permission. Meanwhile, the Baron saves Countess Lydia from being kidnapped by Alla Wunja and his band of marauding Haiduks. Wanting a kiss as his reward the Countess flees on horseback, assisted by Nikola and Mariza.

All later meet at the Empress's chateau, where Lydia, who secretly loves the Baron, is coerced by her Aunt Cornelia into accepting the marriage proposal of the elderly French ambassador, the Marquis de Bouillaibaise. In a sudden twist the show ends with Countess Lydia and Baron Trenck joined together.

== Cast ==
- Walter Passmore – Nikola
- Marie George – Mariza
- Walter Hyde – Baron Trenck
- Caroline Hatchard – Countess Lydia
- William McLaughlin – Alla Wunja (Chief of the Haiduks)
- Herbert Sparling – Marquis de Bouillaibaise
- Molly Lowell – Cornelia
- Rutland Barrington – Herr Dinkelspieler-Kietzerlmayer (Master of Ceremonies, afterwards Major Domo to the Empress)
- Norman Greene – Herald
- Johnny Danvers – Wurzberger (a Court Poet)
- Charles Ure – Count Von Grazt
- Katherine Fielder – Countess Von Grazt
- Zoe Gordon – Fortuna
- Eleanor Wilson – First Page
- Dora Christian – Second Page

== Songs ==
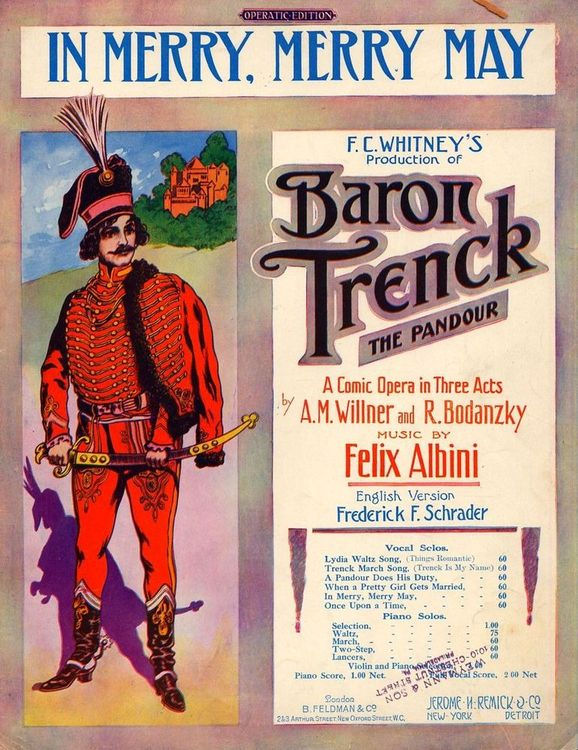
Vocal score for "In Merry, Merry May!" from Baron Trenck

The songs included:

Act 1: A Farmyard in Slavonia

- Opening Chorus: Blend Your Voices – Mariza, Nikola, Master of Ceremonies and Chorus
- Oh Save Me – Lydia, Mariza, Nikola, Master of Ceremonies
- This Handsome Soldier is too Bold – Lydia, Mariza and Nikola
- You Villains – Lydia, Trenck, Nikola, Alla Wunja, Haiduks Chorus

Act 2: The Empress Maria Theresa's Chateau, near Vienna

- How splendid these Halls – Herald and Chorus
- Miriza Darling here you are – Mariza and Nikola
- A Pandour Does His Duty – Mariza, Cornelia, Nikola, Wurzburger, Master of Ceremonies, Alla Wunja
- Angel at Last again I Find you – Trenck and Lydia

Act 3: A Room in Cornelia's Villa in Vienna

- With Song and Cheer – Lydia and Chorus
- Cupid is a Merry Knave – Lydia and Trenck
- Rumwid i Bum – Principals and Chorus

Other songs included:

- Just Like You
- A Kiss for a Dance
- Once Upon a Time
- Goodbye Baron
- When a Pretty Girl Gets Married
- In Merry, Merry May!
- Things Romantic Are My Delight (Waltz Song) – Lydia
- Trenck is My Name (March Song) – Trenck
