= Blossom Time (1934 film) =

1934 British film by Paul L. Stein

- Directed by: Paul L. Stein
- Written by: Heinrich Berté; Roger Burford; George H. Clutsam; John Drinkwater; Franz Schulz; Alfred Maria Willner (libretto); Heinz Reichert (libretto); Rudolf Hans Bartsch (novel Schwammerl)
- Produced by: Walter C. Mycroft
- Starring: Richard Tauber; Jane Baxter; Carl Esmond; Athene Seyler
- Cinematography: Otto Kanturek; Bryan Langley
- Edited by: Leslie Norman
- Music by: G. H. Clutsam
- Release date: 9 July 1934
- Country: United Kingdom
- Language: English

Blossom Time is a 1934 British musical drama film directed by Paul L. Stein and starring Richard Tauber, Jane Baxter and Carl Esmond. It was based on the opera Blossom Time by Heinrich Berté.

In nineteenth century Vienna, composer Franz Schubert assists a girl with whom he is secretly in love. The film had a London midnight premiere on 10 July 1934, a trade/press showing in Nottingham on 25 July, and opened to the public on 24 August at the Regal Cinema, Marble Arch, where it ran for seven weeks. The Vienna premiere was at the 'Apollo' on 20 November 1934.

== Cast ==
- Richard Tauber as Franz Schubert
- Jane Baxter as Vicki Wimpassinger
- Carl Esmond as Count Rudi Von Hohenberg
- Athene Seyler as Archduchess Maria Victoria
- Paul Graetz as Alois Wimpassinger
- Charles Carson as Lafont
- Marguerite Allan as Baroness
- Edward Chapman as Mayrhofer
- Lester Matthews as Schwind
- Gibb McLaughlin as Bauernfeld
- Ivan Samson as Hutten Bremmer
- Frederick Lloyd as Police Captain
- Cecil Ramage as Vogl
- Bertha Belmore as Madame
- Hugh Dempster as Will
- Spencer Trevor as Colonel
- Bruce Winston as Fat Man

== Reception ==
Blossom Time was voted the best British film of 1934 by the readers of Film Weekly.

During the showing on 7 September 1934, Richard Tauber spoke to the audience at the Regal Cinema in London by shortwave from Vienna, where he was appearing in his own operetta 'The Singing Dream'.

== See also ==
- The House of Three Girls (1918)
- Three Girls for Schubert (1936)
- The House of Three Girls (1958)
