= The House of Three Girls (1918 film) =

1918 film

- Directed by: Richard Oswald
- Written by: Alfred Maria Willner (libretto); Heinz Reichert (libretto); Rudolf Hans Bartsch (novel Schwammerl)
- Produced by: Richard Oswald
- Starring: Julius Spielmann; Wilhelm Diegelmann; Sybille Binder
- Cinematography: Max Fassbender
- Production company: Richard-Oswald-Produktion
- Release date: 22 September 1918
- Country: Germany
- Languages: Silent; German intertitles

The House of Three Girls (German:Das Dreimäderlhaus) is a 1918 German silent film directed by Richard Oswald and starring Julius Spielmann, Wilhelm Diegelmann and Sybille Binder. It is based on the operetta Das Dreimäderlhaus. It is considered to be a lost film.

== Cast ==
- Julius Spielmann as Franz Schubert
- Wilhelm Diegelmann as Tscholl
- Sybille Binder as Hannerl
- Kathe Oswald as Heiderl
- Ruth Werner as Hederl
- Anita Berber as Grisi
- Conrad Veidt as Baron Schober
- Bruno Eichgrün as Vogl
- Eynor Ingesson as Moritz von Schwind
- Raoul Lange as Niccolò Paganini
- Adolf Suchanek as Graf Schamrotff
- Max Gülstorff as Nowotnz, ein Vertrauter

== See also ==
- Blossom Time (1934)
- Three Girls for Schubert (1936)
- The House of Three Girls (1958)

== Bibliography ==
- John T. Soister. Conrad Veidt on Screen: A Comprehensive Illustrated Filmography. McFarland, 2002.
