= Eva (1935 film) =

1935 film

- Directed by: Johannes Riemann
- Written by: Ernst Marischka
- Based on: Eva by Alfred Maria Willner and Robert Bodanzky
- Produced by: Reinhold Meißner
- Starring: Magda Schneider; Heinz Rühmann; Hans Söhnker
- Cinematography: Eduard Hoesch
- Edited by: Alwin Elling
- Music by: Franz Lehár; Willy Schmidt-Gentner
- Production company: Atlantis Film
- Distributed by: Neue Deutsch Lichtspiel-Syndikat
- Release date: 25 July 1935
- Running time: 90 minutes
- Country: Austria
- Language: German

Eva is a 1935 Austrian musical comedy film directed by Johannes Riemann and starring Magda Schneider, Heinz Rühmann and Hans Söhnker. It is an operetta film based on the 1911 operetta of the same title composed by Franz Lehár with a libretto by Alfred Maria Willner and Robert Bodanzky. It was shot at the Sievering Studios in Vienna. The film's sets were designed by the art director Julius von Borsody. Also known as Eva the Factory Girl the film updates the setting from the pre-First World War to the present day.

== Cast ==
- Magda Schneider as Eva
- Heinz Rühmann as Willibald Riegele
- Hans Söhnker as Georg von Hochheim
- Adele Sandrock as Malvine von Hochheim
- Ferdinand Mayerhofer as Werkmeister Holzer, Evas Ziehvater
- Hans Moser as Vinzenz Wimmer, Prokurist
- Mimi Shorp as Olly, Kabarettsängerin
- Franz Schafheitlin as Stefan, ein Arbeiter
- Paul Henreid as Fritz
- Fritz Puchstein as Jonny
- Fritz Imhoff as Gemeindewächter

== Bibliography ==
- Goble, Alan. The Complete Index to Literary Sources in Film. Walter de Gruyter, 1999.
- Klaus, Ulrich J. Deutsche Tonfilme: Jahrgang 1935. Klaus-Archiv, 1988.
- Körner, Torsten. Der kleine Mann als Star: Heinz Rühmann und seine Filme der 50er Jahre. Campus Verlag, 2001.
- Von Dassanowsky, Robert. Screening Transcendence: Film Under Austrofascism and the Hollywood Hope, 1933-1938. Indiana University Press, 2018
