= Eva (operetta) =

Operetta in three acts by Franz Lehár

Eva (Das Fabriksmädel)
- Operetta by Franz Lehár
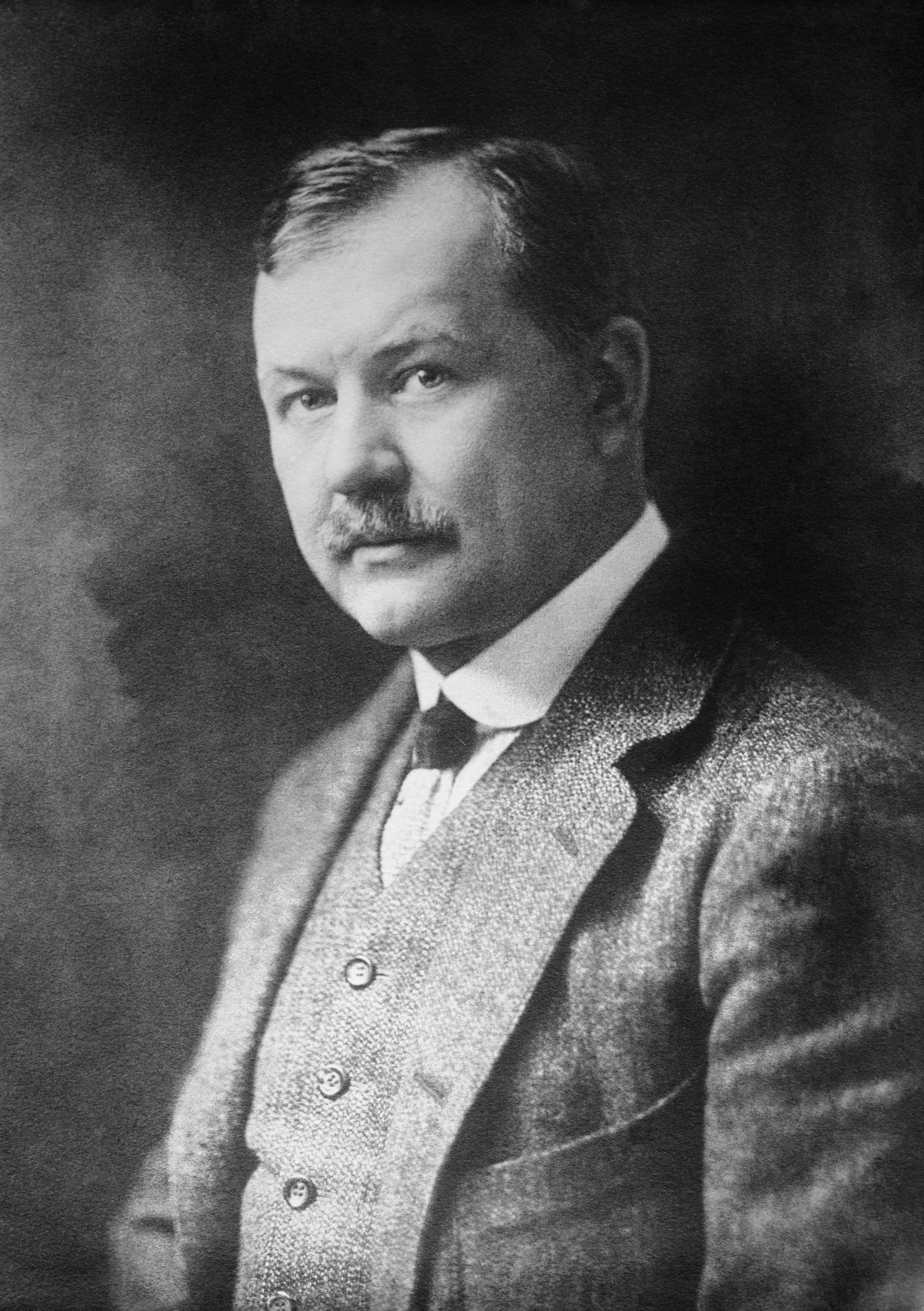
- The composer
- Librettist: Alfred Maria Willner; Robert Bodanzky
- Language: German
- Premiere: November 24, 1911; Vienna

Eva, alternatively entitled Das Fabriksmädel (from German: The Factory Girl), is an operetta in three acts by Austro-Hungarian composer Franz Lehár with a German-language libretto by Alfred Maria Willner and Robert Bodanzky. Premiered in 1911, it tells the story of a young working-class woman who falls in love with an aristocratic officer, but their romance is in jeopardy because of rigid social conventions and class barriers.

== Background ==
Eva was conceived at a time in which specialized press was calling for theater and operetta to depict real life and the struggle of the working class, particularly that of rising prices and lack of shelter. Loosely inspired by the events unfolding in Ernst von Wildenbruch's Die Haubenlerche (1891), Eva was Lehár's most controversial operetta at the time of its creation, because it was regarded as a political work, more specifically socialist propaganda. Out of fear that bad publicity would ruin attendance, both its librettists and the composer rejected the notion that it had anything to do with socialism or social issues, at the request of then-director of the Theater an der Wien Wilhelm Karczag.

It was premiered on November 24, 1911, at the Theater an der Wien, in Vienna, Austria. The operetta saw a great success in its time, and it was translated to many other languages. The French version adapted by Maurice Ordonneau and Jean Bénédict was premiered at the Théatre de l'Alhambra, in Brussels, Belgium, on December 4, 1912, with conductor Paul Clerget. An English-language version adapted by Glen McDonough also premiered at the New Amsterdam Theater in New York. This Broadway production started on December 30, 1912 and ran for 24 performances. Three additional Spanish-language adaptations were made by Gonzalo Jover (1912), Atanasio Melantuche (1913), and Julián Moyrón and Emilio González del Castillo (1914). The first of the three adaptations premiered at the Teatre Novedades in Barcelona, on February 12, 1912., whereas the subsequent arrangements premiered in Madrid, Melantuche's version at the Teatro de la Zarzuela, on September 17, 1913, and Moyrón/del Castillo's version at the Teatro del Apolo, on June 14, 1914. Its success spread to other countries, particularly towards the south, as Eva opened an early opera theater in Tripoli, Italian-era Libya, in 1912. After the first decades since its inception, the popularity of the work declined and, nowadays, it is generally not played in full, but only as individual selections at concerts.

== Plot ==
=== Act I ===
The entrance to a factory, festively decorated.

The factory workers are celebrating the birthday of Eva, an orphan who, as a small child, was entrusted to the factory manager, Larousse. He made sure that Eva was effectively raised by the entire workforce. On the day of her birthday celebration, Octave Flaubert takes up his post as the new director of the factory. Eva longs for a better, more pleasant life, and since Flaubert is a charming bon vivant, the two quickly grow close. Prunelles, the factory’s accountant, also works there, and Flaubert soon strikes up a friendly relationship with him. Prunelles, who secretly envies his director, is also familiar with Paris, where he once led a life full of adventures. Pepita Panquerette, known as “Pipsi,” lives in Paris. Every holiday she sets her sights on a wealthy admirer willing to finance her pleasures. Years ago, Prunelles himself was one of Pipsi’s conquests. Millefleurs, a wealthy miser, arrives at Flaubert’s factory accompanied by his “girlfriend” Pepita, hoping to hide from her supposedly jealous husband. In reality, this husband does not exist — Pepita invented him so that she could travel with Millefleurs. When Prunelles sees Pepita, he immediately recognises her as Pipsi and realises the deception, but he keeps silent, unwilling to make a fool of himself in front of his colleagues.

=== Act II ===
The salon in Flaubert’s villa.

Flaubert throws a lavish party for his friend Millefleurs, at which he formally introduces Eva to high society. Eva believes in Flaubert’s love, especially since he has showered her with expensive clothes and jewellery. Meanwhile, Larousse misses his foster daughter deeply and wants to bring her back home. When Flaubert refuses to let Eva leave, Larousse summons the entire factory workforce. Before the situation can escalate, Flaubert declares his intention to marry Eva. Unwilling to oppose such a marriage, the workers withdraw. By chance, Eva overhears a conversation between Flaubert and Millefleurs. Flaubert admits that he lied to the workers and never had any intention of marrying her. Now Eva can neither remain at the villa nor return to the workers — not even to Larousse — as she is overwhelmed with shame. She throws the jewellery at Flaubert’s feet and flees.

=== Act III ===
A house in the Bois de Boulogne, Paris.

Eva is now living with Pepita Paquerette. The two women get along well, although Eva can neither imitate nor approve of Pepita’s way of life. Shaken by Eva’s flight, Flaubert changes his ways and searches for her throughout Paris. When he finally finds her, he declares his sincere love and asks her to marry him. Millefleurs, too, abandons his former lifestyle. He accepts a position and is now able to marry his beloved Pipsi.

== Roles ==
Very little information has survived on the premiere, even though additional premieres outside of Germany are often listed and more commonly addressed. Additional productions abroad were not mere translations of the operetta, but rather adaptations, in which some characters were replaced or renamed, others were created, and others disappeared. The following is a list of roles in the original production of Eva:

Role	Voice type
Octave Flaubert, the factory owner	tenor
Anselm Bachelin	—
Dagobert Millefleurs, Octave's stepson	tenor buffo
Pepita "Pipsi" Desirée Paquerette, a young woman	soprano
Bernard Larousse, assistant foreman	bass
Eva, a worker at the factory	soprano
Mathieu, a servant in Flaubert's household	bass-baritone
Voisin, chief bookkeeper at Flaubert's factory	baritone
Prunelles, second bookkeeper at Flaubert's factory	baritone
Teddy, Flaubert's friend	baritone
Fredy, Flaubert's friend	baritone
Factory workers, clerks, friends of Octave, household servants, and guests

== Musical numbers ==
Eva is an operetta in a prelude and three acts, further divided into 18 musical numbers. It is scored for solo voices and an orchestra consisting of two flutes (the second doubling piccolo), two oboes, two clarinets, and two bassoons; four horns, two trumpets, three trombones, timpani, a percussion section, harp, and a standard string section. Translated versions had their numbers rearranged or removed entirely. The original version of Eva is structured as follows:

Structure of Franz Lehár's Eva
Musical number	Title	Characters	Incipit
—	Vorspiel (Prelude)	—	—
Act I
1	Introduktion (Introduction)	Larousse & chorus	"Heissa, juchheia"
2	Melodram und Lied (Melodrama and Song)	Eva	"Im heimlichen Dämmer der silbernen Ampel"
3	Szene und Duett (Scene and Duet)	Octave, Voisin, & Prunelles	"Bestimmung, Fatum, das ist alles"
4	Auftritt und Duett (Entrance and Duet)	Pipsi & Dagobert	"Nur keine Angst, hier kann nichts passieren"
5	Duett (Duet)	Pipsi & Octave	"Um zwölfe in der Nacht"
6	Finale I	Eva, Octave, Prunelles, & Larousse	"Halt! Einen Augenblick, ihr Leute!"
Act II
7	Introduktion, Chor, Lied und Tanz (Introduction, Chorus, Song, and Dance)	Pipsi, Dagobert, Prunelles, Teddy, Fredy, & chorus	"Retten Sie mich, Dagobert"
8	Marsch (March)	Octave, Dagobert, Prunelles, Teddy, Fredy, Georges, Gustav, Henry, Pipsi, & seven ladies	"Hat man das erste Stiefelpaar vertreten"
9	Terzett (Trio)	Pipsi, Dagobert, & Prunelles	"Rechts das Männchen meiner Wahl"
10	Melodram und Duett (Melodrama and Duet)	Eva & Octave	"Erschrecken Sie nicht"
11	Lied (Song)	Octave	"Octave, gesteh' dir's ein"
12	Duett (Duet)	Pipsi & Dagobert	"Ziehe hin zu deinem Vater"
13	Melodram und Duett (Melodrama and Duet)	Eva & Octave	"Eva, Sie sehen reizend aus"
14	Finale II	Eva, Pipsi, Octave, Dagobert, Teddy, Fredy, Larousse, & chorus of laborers	"Silentium, silentium"
Act III
15	Duett (Duet)	Eva & Pipsi	"Wenn die Pariserin spazieren fährt"
16	Lied (Song)	Eva, Teddy, Fredy, & chorus	"Gib acht, gib acht, mein schönes Kind"
17	Abgang (Departure)	Dagobert & Pipsi	"Sagen Sie nur, Pipsi"
18	Finale III	Eva, Octave, & chorus	"Ein Mädel wie Sie, so nett und so fein"
