= The Count of Luxemburg (1972 film) =

1972 film

- Directed by: Wolfgang Glück
- Written by: Hugo Wiener; Wolfgang Glück; A.M. Willner (libretto); Robert Bodanzky
- Produced by: Helmut Bauer; Fritz Buttenstedt
- Starring: Eberhard Wächter; Lilian Sukis; Erich Kunz
- Cinematography: Jürgen Jürges; Heinz Pehlke
- Edited by: Gisela Haller
- Music by: Bert Grund; Franz Lehár (operetta)
- Production company: Unitel Film
- Distributed by: Unitel Film
- Release date: December 1972
- Running time: 95 minutes
- Country: West Germany
- Language: German

The Count of Luxemburg (German: Der Graf von Luxemburg) is a 1972 German musical comedy film directed by Wolfgang Glück and starring Eberhard Wächter, Lilian Sukis and Erich Kunz. It is an adaptation of the operetta Der Graf von Luxemburg by Franz Lehár.

== Cast ==
- Eberhard Wächter as Graf von Luxemburg
- Lilian Sukis as Angele Didier
- Erich Kunz as Fürst Basil
- Peter Fröhlich as Armand Brissand
- Helga Papouschek as Juliette Vermont
- Jane Tilden as Stasa Kokozow
- Kurt Sowinetz as Pellegrin
- Georg Corten as Paulovditsch
- Kurt Zips as Mentschikoff
