= Alfred Maria Willner =

Austrian writer, philosopher, musicologist, composer and librettist

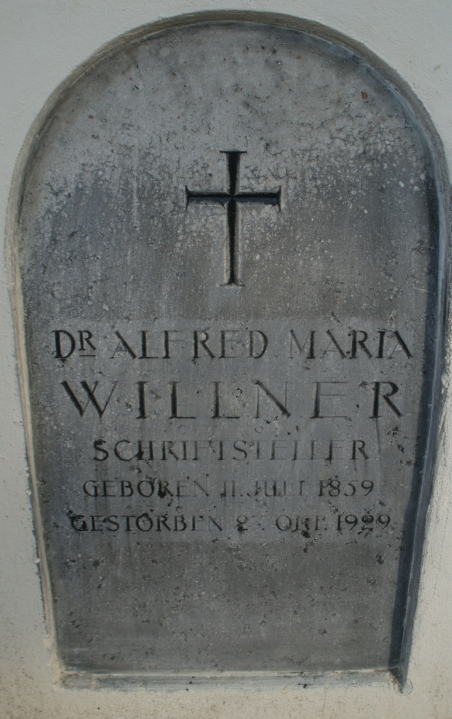
Feuerhalle Simmering, grave of Alfred Willner

Alfred Maria Willner (11 July 1859 – 27 October 1929) was an Austrian writer, philosopher, musicologist, composer and librettist.

== Biography ==
Alfred Maria Willner was born and died in Vienna. He began composing mostly music for the piano and eventually made a career writing librettos for ballets, operas and operettas. One of his early operettas was Johann Strauss II’s Die Göttin der Vernunft, a commission that Strauss regretted. Strauss was forced to complete the commission only by the threat of a lawsuit and declined to attend a performance. Later the libretto and score were legally separated, and Willner revised the libretto for Franz Lehár as Der Graf von Luxemburg.

Willner's first big success was his libretto for Leo Fall’s Die Dollarprinzessin, after which he became a much sought-after operetta librettist. He wrote several successful librettos for Lehár operettas, particularly in collaboration with Heinz Reichert. The two also collaborated on highly successful adaptations of music by Schubert (such as Das Dreimäderlhaus) and by Johann Strauss father and son (such as Walzer aus Wien). In addition, Willner and Reichert were the contracted librettists for Puccini's opera La rondine which was later adapted by Giuseppe Adami.

Willner and composer Sigmund Romberg were the producers for the 1921 Broadway production of Love Birds.

Alfred Maria Willner was cremated at Feuerhalle Simmering in Vienna, where also his ashes are buried.

== Librettos ==
- Das Heimchen am Herd (opera), music by Karl Goldmark, 1896
- Die Schneeflocke (opera), music by Heinrich Berté, 1896
- Der Schmetterling (operetta, with Bernhard Buchbinder), music by Charles Weinberger, 1896
- Die Göttin der Vernunft (operetta, with Buchbinder), music by Johann Strauss II, 1897
- Fräulein Hexe (operetta, with Buchbinder), music by Josef Bayer, 1898
- Die Debutantin (operetta, with Heinrich von Waldberg), music by Alfred Zamara, 1901
- Das Baby (operetta, with Waldberg), music by Richard Heuberger, 1902
- Die Millionenbraut (operetta, with E. Limé), music by Berté, 1904
- Der schöne Gardist (operetta, with A. Landesberg), music by Berté, 1907
- Der kleine Chevalier, (operetta), music by Berté, 1907
- Die Dollarprinzessin (operetta, with Fritz Grünbaum), music by Leo Fall, 1907
- Ein Wintermärchen (Opera), music by Goldmark, 1908
- Baron Trenck (operetta, with Robert Bodanzky), music by Felix Albini, 1908
- Ein Mädchen für Alles (operetta, with Waldberg), music by Heinrich Reinhardt, 1908
- Die Paradiesvögel (operetta, with Julius Wilhelm), music by Philipp Silber, 1908
- Die Glücksnarr (operetta, with Landesberg), music by Berté, 1908
- Die Sprudelfee (operetta, with Wilhelm), music by Reinhardt, 1909
- Der Graf von Luxemburg (operetta, with Bodanzky), music by Franz Lehár, 1909
- Zigeunerliebe (operetta, with Bodanzky), music by Lehár, 1910
- Schneeglöckchen (operetta, with Wilhelm), music by G. Kerker, 1910
- Das Puppenmädel (operetta, with Leo Stein), music by Leo Fall, 1910
- Die schöne Risette (operetta, with Bodanzky), music by Leo Fall, 1910
- Die Sirene (operetta, with Leo Stein), music by Leo Fall, 1911
- Der Eisenhammer (Opera), music by Blagoje Bersa, 1911 (as Oganj)
- Der flotte Bob (operetta, with Wilhelm Sterk), music by K. Stigler, 1911
- Die kleine Freundin (operetta, with Leo Stein), music by Oscar Straus, 1911
- Eva [Das Fabriksmädel] (operetta, with Bodanzky), music by Lehár, 1911
- Casimirs Himmelfahrt (burleske Operette, with Bodanzky), music by Bruno Granichstaedten, 1911
- Prinzess Gretl (operetta, with Bodanzky), music by Reinhardt, 1913
- Endlich allein (operetta, with Bodanzky), music by Lehár, 1914
- Der Schuster von Delft (Opera, with Wilhelm), music by Bersa, 1914 (as Postolar iz Delfta)
- Der Märchenprinz (operetta, with Sterk), music by Berté, 1914
- Der Durchgang der Venus (operetta, with Rudolf Österreicher), music by Edmund Eysler, 1914
- Der künstliche Mensch (operetta, with Österreicher), music by Leo Fall, 1915
- Die erste Frau (operetta, with Österreicher), music by Reinhardt, 1915
- Wenn zwei sich lieben (operetta, with Bodanzky), music by Eysler, 1915
- Das Dreimäderlhaus (Singspiel, with Heinz Reichert, after R. H. Bartsch: Schwammerl), music by Berté, 1916
- Die Faschingsfee (operetta, with Österreicher), music by Kálmán, 1917 (based on Zsuzsi kisasszony)
- Die schöne Saskia (operetta, with Reichert), music by Oskar Nedbal, 1917
- La rondine (opera), music by Giacomo Puccini, 1917
- Hannerl [Dreimäderlhaus, part 2] (Singspiel, with Reichert), music by K. Lafite, 1918
- Wo die Lerche singt (operetta, with Reichert), music by Lehár, 1918
- Johann Nestroy (Singspiel, with Österreicher), music by E. Reiterer, 1918
- Nimm mich mit (operetta, with Waldberg), music by H. Dostal, 1919
- Der heilige Ambrosius (comedy, with A. Rebner), music by Leo Fall, 1921
- Nixchen (operetta, with Österreicher), music by Oscar Straus, 1921
- Das Milliardensouper (operetta, with H. Kottow), music by Ernst Steffan, 1921
- Frasquita (operetta, with Reichert), music by Lehár, 1922
- Libellentanz (Revue-Operette), music by Lehár, 1923
- Agri (operetta, with Sterk), music by Ernst Steffan, 1924
- Ein Ballroman [Der Kavalier von zehn bis vier] (operetta, with Österreicher and F. Rotter), music by Robert Stolz, 1924
- Der Mitternachtswalzer (operetta, with Österreicher), music by Robert Stolz, 1926
- Ade, du liebes Elternhaus [Die Lori] (Singspiel, with Reichert), music by O. Jascha, 1928
- Rosen aus Florida (operetta, with Reichert), music by Korngold, after Leo Fall, 1929
- Walzer aus Wien (Singspiel, with Reichert and Ernst Marischka), music by J. Bittner and Korngold, after J. Strauss II and I, 1930

== Filmography ==
- The House of Three Girls, directed by Richard Oswald (Germany, 1918)
- Das Milliardensouper , directed by Victor Janson (Germany, 1923)
- The Count of Luxembourg, directed by Arthur Gregor (1926)
- Der Mitternachtswalzer, directed by Heinz Paul (Austria, 1929)
- The Rogue Song, directed by Lionel Barrymore (1930, based on Gypsy Love)
- Die Faschingsfee, directed by Hans Steinhoff (Germany, 1931)
- Waltzes from Vienna, directed by Alfred Hitchcock (UK, 1934)
- Blossom Time, directed by Paul L. Stein (UK, 1934)
- Frasquita, directed by Karel Lamač (Austria, 1934)
- Eva, directed by Johannes Riemann (Austria, 1935)
- Three Girls for Schubert, directed by E. W. Emo (Germany, 1936)
- Where the Lark Sings, directed by Karel Lamač (Germany, 1936)
- Where the Lark Sings, directed by Hans Wolff (Austria, 1956)
- The Count of Luxembourg, directed by Werner Jacobs (West Germany, 1957)
- The House of Three Girls, directed by Ernst Marischka (Austria, 1958)
- The Count of Luxembourg, directed by Wolfgang Glück (West Germany, 1972)

== Sources ==
- The New Grove Dictionary of Opera, edited by Stanley Sadie (1992), ISBN 0-333-73432-7 and ISBN 1-56159-228-5
- The Oxford Dictionary of Opera, by John Warrack and Ewan West (1992), ISBN 0-19-869164-5
