= Die Firma Hesselbach =

- Genre: Family Drama
- Starring: Wolf Schmidt (as Karl "Babba" Hesselbach ); Lisel Christ (as Marie Mathilde Eleonore "Mamma" Hesselbach ); Boost Siedhoff (as Willi Hesselbach); Helga Neuner (as Helga Schneider); Joachim Engel-Denis (as Fred Lindner); Rose-Marie Kirstein (as Heidi Hesselbach); Dieter Henkel (as Peter Hesselbach); Max Strecker (as Arthur Münzenberger); Käte Jaenicke (as Hilde Sauerberg); Ursula Köllner (as Else Sauerberg); Doris Mack (as Jutta Schäfer); Sophie Cossaeus (as Fräulein Lohmeier); Gaby Reichardt (as Emmi Puchel); Sofie Engelke (as Frieda Lahmann); Lia Wöhr (as Frau Siebenhals); Sibylle Schindler (as Fräulein Pinella); Bogislav von Heyden (as Hans-Ulrich Betzdorf); Josef Wageck (as Hausmeister Ballmann); Otto Stern (as Zimmermann); Dieter Schwanda (as Rudi Krausgrill, Lehrbub); Iska Geri (as Frau Dr. Meyer); Inge Rassaerts (as Irene Müller); Dorle Hintze (as Agathe Flockenbusch); Christina Monden (as Inge Fröhlich); Edith Hancke (as Trudi Plischke); Ernst Walter Mitulski (as Kaufhausbesitzer); Fritz Straßner (as Herr Dr. Moosbauer); Georg Lehn (as Herr Dr. Tritschel); Gudrun Gewecke (as Erna, Hesselbachs Nichte); Uwe Dallmeier (as Detlef Petersen); Hertha Genzmer (as Martha u.a.); Eva-Maria Werth (as Uta Castell); Astrid Frank (as Karin Schubert); Nora Bendig (as Elke, Lehrmädchen); Wilhelm Schmidt (as Setzer Loy); Reno Nonsens (as Pförtner)
- Theme music composer: Willy Czernik
- Country of origin: Germany
- Original language: German
- No. of seasons: 3
- No. of episodes: 51

Original release
- Network: Deutsches Fernsehen
- Release: January 22, 1960 – 1967

Die Firma Hesselbach is a German television series.

== Storyline ==
The television series revolves around the trivial aspects of everyday life as experienced by the Hesselbach family - providing a glimpse into the petit bourgeois milieu of the nascent Federal Republic of Germany.

Karl "Babba" Hesselbach (portrayed by Wolf Schmidt) is the proprietor of a small printing company and the publisher of the weekly newspaper called Weltschau am Sonntag. He is married to "Mamma" Hesselbach (Liesel Christ). Initially, the narrative unfolds in an undisclosed location in Hesse but transitions to the fictional town of Steintal in the concluding season.

Throughout the first season, the plot revolves around the day-to-day operations of the publishing house, which assumes center stage. Alongside this, other events within the personal lives of the characters primarily surrounding challenges stemming from the era's economic times. These challenges include scarcities of both raw materials and labor force. As the season draws to a close, Heidi (Rose-Marie Kirstein) and Peter (Dieter Henkel), the Hesselbachs' offspring, conclude their studies at a boarding school and follow in their family's entrepreneurial footsteps, joining the printing and publishing business.

== See also ==
- Die Hesselbachs
- List of German television series
