= Helen Watts =

Welsh contralto

Helen Watts CBE (7 December 1927 – 7 October 2009) was a Welsh contralto.

== Early life ==
Helen Josephine Watts was born in Milford Haven, Pembrokeshire, Wales. Her father was a pharmacist, Tom Watts and moved to live above his shop at 26 Market Street, Haverfordwest, Wales as a child. She was educated at Taskers School for Girls in Haverfordwest, the Abbots Bromley School for Girls, and at the Royal Academy of Music where she was taught voice by Caroline Hatchard.

== Career ==
She began her career with the Glyndebourne Festival Chorus, and was a regular broadcaster on the Welsh Home Service. She subsequently had a distinguished career as an opera singer. She sang Bach arias at her debut at The Proms, in 1955. She toured the Soviet Union with the English Opera Group in 1964, singing the lead in The Rape of Lucretia. She was also known for her 1969 performances as Mistress Quickly in Verdi's Falstaff with the Welsh National Opera. In 1969, her voice was described by a critic as "not particularly large, but the general purity and warmth of its tone gives it a direct, communicative power. And the singer uses it with taste and imagination."

The many recordings by Helen Watts included a "monumental" edition of forty Bach cantatas, with Helmuth Rilling conducting the Bach-Collegium Stuttgart. She also made several recordings as a soloist in Handel's Messiah, various roles in Wagner's Ring cycle, and an album of Welsh songs with the Treorchy male voice choir.

She was asked to choose her favourite record, book, and luxury as a guest on BBC Radio 4's Desert Island Discs in 1970. They were:

- favourite track: Betrachte Meine Seele, from the St John Passion by Johann Sebastian Bach; book: Illustrated book on gardening; luxury: Diego Velázquez's The Maids of Honour, (Las Meninas) in the Prado.

In 1978, she was appointed a Commander of the Order of the British Empire (CBE).

== Personal life ==
Helen Watts married Michael Mitchell, a viola player with the London Symphony Orchestra, in 1980. Mitchell died in 2007. Watts died on 7 October 2009 at the age of 81.

== Literature ==
- D. Brook, Singers of Today (Revised Edition - Rockliff, London 1958), pp. 198–200.
