= '38 – Vienna Before the Fall =

1986 film

38 – Auch das war Wien
- U.S theatrical release poster
- Directed by: Wolfgang Glück
- Written by: Friedrich Torberg (novel); Wolfgang Glück
- Produced by: Michael von Wolkenstein; Christine Gouze-Rénal (co-producer); Herbert Reutterer (executive producer)
- Starring: Tobias Engel; Sunnyi Melles
- Cinematography: Gérard Vandenberg
- Edited by: Heidi Handorf; Wolfgang B. Heine
- Music by: Bert Grund
- Distributed by: East West Classics
- Release dates: 1986 (Austria); 23 April 1987 (West Germany)
- Running time: 97 minutes
- Countries: West Germany; Austria
- Language: German

'38 – Vienna Before the Fall (German: 38 – Auch das war Wien, lit. '38 – That too was Vienna') is a 1986 Austrian-West German co-produced drama film directed by Wolfgang Glück. It was nominated for the Academy Award for Best Foreign Language Film at the 59th Academy Awards. It is set in Vienna in 1937–1938 at the time of the Anschluss.

== Plot ==
The story begins in 1937 and unfolds between Vienna and Berlin. Actress Carola Hell is at the beginning of a promising career. She finds love with Martin Hoffmann, an assimilated Jewish writer, and moves in with him into a shared apartment. Despite the political changes, they believe they can live their love in an apolitical private sphere. During a performance in Berlin, Carola has her first encounters with the Gestapo. When she fails to report at the agreed time, Martin, against warnings from friends, decides to travel to Berlin but is intercepted and searched on the way.

Back in Vienna, the worsening situation on the streets and the reactions of the antisemitic caretaker, actor colleagues, or the housekeeper whose socialist husband is imprisoned, confront the couple. The housekeeper recalls the February Uprising of 1934 and offers Hoffmann shelter in her communal apartment in case of emergency. With Austria's annexation completed, Carola informs Martin that she is pregnant. Together they try to escape to Prague by train, but Martin is picked out of the crowd at the station while Carola manages to flee. When he tries to accept the housekeeper's offer, she refuses because her son is a Nazi, and it wouldn't end well. A taxi driver promises Hoffmann to take him to the border the next day, but he is intercepted by the Gestapo on his way home that same night.

== Cast ==
- Tobias Engel as Martin
- Sunnyi Melles as Carola
- Heinz Trixner as Toni
- Romuald Pekny as Sovary
- Ingrid Burkhard as Frau Schostal
- Josef Fröhlich as Kemetter
- Tanja von Oertzen as Frau von Wartenburg

== Reception ==
"The well-intentioned attempt to address a dark chapter of Austro-German history is noteworthy, if only for its subject matter – worthy of discussion," wrote the Lexikon des Internationalen Films. The television magazine Prisma (TV magazine) commented: "Unfortunately, the result offers polished boredom with nostalgic images and often irritating moralizing."

"In times when what was thought to be overcome resurfaces, when the past, even 50 years later, remains unresolved and is to be silenced again: in such times, a film like this cannot be too much." (Wolfgang Glück)

== Awards ==
The film was nominated in 1987 for the Academy Award for Best Foreign Language Film, but lost to The Assault by Dutch filmmaker Fons Rademakers.

The Deutsche Film- und Medienbewertung (FBW) in Wiesbaden awarded the film the "valuable" rating.

== See also ==
- List of submissions to the 59th Academy Awards for Best Foreign Language Film
- List of Austrian submissions for the Academy Award for Best Foreign Language Film
