= Caroline Hatchard =

British soprano, musical theatre and opera singer

Caroline Hatchard

Caroline Gertrude Hatchard (12 October 1883 – 7 January 1970) was a British lyric soprano, musical theatre and opera singer of the 20th-century who was the first English-born and trained soprano to be engaged by the Royal Opera House in Covent Garden where she played Sophie in the British premiere of Strauss's Der Rosenkavalier on 29 January 1913 with Thomas Beecham conducting.

== Early years ==
Caroline "Carrie" Gertrude Hatchard was born in Portsmouth in Hampshire in 1883, the fourth of five daughters born to Alice née Brooks (1855-1913) and George James Hatchard (1823-1925), a clerk with the Postal Telegraph service. The parents realised that four of their daughters had musical talent with "Carrie" in particular being a gifted soprano. Aged 17 in 1890 she enrolled at the Royal Academy of Music where fellow students included Arnold Bax, Hubert Bath, Eric Coates and York Bowen. While at the RCM she lodged with a family in Streatham where she met civil servant Robert Squire Langford (1880-1946), whom she married at Streatham on 23 August 1908. They had two sons: Peter H G Langford (1915–2010) and Ewen Langford (1923–2011).

== Singing career ==
Hatchard had an important stage and concert platform career from the Edwardian era up to the 1920s, regularly playing leading roles with the Covent Garden Opera Company, the Denhof Opera Company and the Beecham Opera Company. She made her début at the Queen's Hall in a Prom concert in 1904 at which she sang Sullivan's 'Orpheus with his Lute' and she continued to appear there until 1928. She sang Sullivan's The Golden Legend in Plymouth in March 1905.

On her graduation from the Royal College of Music Hatchard sang in concerts and oratorio until she joined the cast of the musical Les Merveilleuses, or The Wonder Women as Mariette at Daly's Theatre from late 1906 until May 1907. In August 1907 she first appeared as Marietta opposite Walter Hyde as Andrea in The Three Kisses at the Apollo Theatre in London while her Royal Opera House début in 1907 was Dewman the Dew Fairy in Humperdinck's Hansel and Gretel. Other early roles included Flora Bervoix and the Naiad in Gluck's Armide. For Hans Richter's 1908 The Ring in English at the Royal Opera House she sang Woglinde and Second Norn in Götterdämmerung and Woodbird in Siegfried. In the same season she sang Flora Bervoix in La Traviata and Siebel in Faust. She reprised various of those roles for the Denhof Opera Company in Edinburgh, Glasgow and other cities in 1910 before returning to Covent Garden for its Ring Cycle in 1924 in which she appeared as Second Norn and the Rhinemaiden Wellgunde. From 1910 under the baton of Thomas Beecham she sang Olympia in The Tales of Hoffmann (1910) and Rosalinde in Die Fledermaus (1910). In March 1911 she sang in Sullivan's The Martyr of Antioch with the Huddersfield Choral Society conducted by Sir Henry Coward. From May 1911 she played Countess Lydia opposite Walter Hyde as Trenck in Baron Trenck at the Whitney Theatre in London.

She played The Queen of the Night in The Magic Flute (1913) and Sophie in the British premiere of Der Rosenkavalier at the Royal Opera House in London on 29 January 1913 with Thomas Beecham conducting. In September 1913 Hatchard began a tour of the provinces for Ernst Denhof in which she reprised Sophie in Der Rosenkavalier, The Queen of the Night in The Magic Flute and sang the Forest Bird in Siegfried and Eva in The Mastersingers. In oratorio she sang Messiah and Elijah, in Bach's Mass In B Minor and St Matthew Passion; in Handel's Judas Maccabeus, Israel In Egypt and Acis and Galatea and The Creation by Haydn. In 1916 she created Tilburina in Stanford's The Critic, and sang Margarita in Faust. Micaela in Carmen followed in 1918.

Hatchard was a frequent singer at the Proms from 1904 to 1928 and her singing was regularly broadcast in the then new medium of radio from 1924. In 1925 she appeared in Dame Ethel Smyth's Mass in D at the Royal Albert Hall, with Herbert Heyner and Astra Desmond, with Malcolm Sargent conducting and sang Polly in John Gay's The Beggar's Opera in March 1928 with the Halifax Choral Society. In February 1929 she was the soloist in The Early Spring Sun by Dr. Harold Lake performed with the Plymouth Madrigal Society.

In the early 1930s she left the stage to become a teacher of voice at the Royal Academy of Music where one of her students was Helen Watts, remaining there until her retirement in 1952.

== Recordings ==
From 1909 to 1911 and 1921 to 1923 Hatchard recorded 27 discs with 21 being released. These included songs by Löhr, Clarke, Lehmann and Sullivan, two songs from The Arcadians ('Pipes of Pan' and 'Light is My Heart'), the aria 'With Verdure Clad' from Haydn's The Creation, 'For Tonight' (The Waltz Song) from Tom Jones by Edward German and three Gilbert and Sullivan arias ('Poor Wand'ring One', 'The Sun Whose Rays, and 'Love is a Plaintive Song') as well as arias by Offenbach ('You've Pledged Your Word' and 'The Doll Song' from The Tales of Hoffmann), Delibes, Verdi, Meyerbeer and Donizetti.

Caroline Hatchard died in London in 1970 aged 87.
