= Three Girls for Schubert =

1936 film

- Directed by: E. W. Emo
- Written by: Rudolf Hans Bartsch (novel Schwammerl); E. W. Emo; Arthur Pohl; Hanns Sassmann; Franz Baumann
- Produced by: Paul Hörbiger; Karl Künzel
- Starring: Paul Hörbiger; Gretl Theimer; Maria Andergast
- Cinematography: Eduard Hoesch
- Edited by: René Métain
- Music by: Alois Melichar
- Production companies: Algefa Film; Tobis Film
- Distributed by: Neue Deutsch Lichtspiel-Syndikat
- Release date: 4 August 1936
- Running time: 93 minutes
- Country: Germany
- Language: German

Three Girls for Schubert (German: Drei Mäderl um Schubert) is a 1936 German historical romance film directed by E. W. Emo and starring Paul Hörbiger, Gretl Theimer, and Maria Andergast. It was shot at the Johannisthal Studios of Tobis Film in Berlin. The film's sets were designed by the art directors Fritz Maurischat and Karl Weber. Location filming took place in Vienna and the Vienna Woods outside the city.

== Cast ==
- Paul Hörbiger as Franz Schubert
- Maria Andergast as Heiderl
- Else Elster as Hannerl
- Gretl Theimer as Hederl
- Gustav Waldau as father Tschöll
- Julia Serda as Mrs. Tscholl
- Karl Braun as Kammersänger Vogl
- Rudolf Fones as painter Moritz von Schwind
- Wolfgang von Schwindt as Kupelwieser
- Iván Petrovich as Furlani
- Karl Hellmer as saddle maker Bruneder
- Hilde Hofer-Pittschau as Mrs. Bruneder
- Erich Musil as Anton Bruneder, son
- Fritz Ley as postmaster Binder
- Aribert Wäscher as publisher Artaria
- Hans Junkermann as court counsellor Schauerhuber
- Julius Brandt as court legal secretry Juritsch
- Hanns Waschatko as Baron von Spaun
- Josefine Dora as housekeeper
- Toni von Bukovics as housekeeper

== See also ==
Other films based on similar material:

- The House of Three Girls (1918)
- Blossom Time (1934)
- The House of Three Girls (1958)
