= Die Hesselbachs =

- Country of origin: Germany
- No. of seasons: 3
- No. of episodes: 51

Original release
- Network: Hessischer Rundfunk
- Release: 22 January 1960 – 7 June 1967

Die Hesselbachs is a German radio play series. The series started in 1949 and was adapted for television in 1960. There was also a film Die Familie Hesselbach (1954) and its sequels.

The series deals with the experiences of the Hesselbach family, who ran a printing and publishing company in a fictitious town in Hesse.

Author and actor Wolf Schmidt dealt with current social issues. Thus the series in Germany was one of the most successful television series of its time.

== See also ==
- Die Firma Hesselbach
- List of German television series
