= The Schimeck Family (1957 film) =

1957 film

- Directed by: Georg Jacoby
- Written by: Helmuth M. Backhaus; Karl Farkas
- Based on: The Schimek Family by Gustaf Kadelburg
- Produced by: Alfred Stöger
- Starring: Theo Lingen; Fita Benkhoff; Helga Neuner
- Cinematography: Elio Carniel
- Edited by: Renate Jelinek
- Music by: Heinz Sandauer
- Production company: Vienna Mundus
- Distributed by: Europa-Filmverleih
- Release date: 24 May 1957
- Running time: 97 minutes
- Country: Austria
- Language: German

The Schimeck Family (German: Familie Schimek) is a 1957 Austrian comedy film directed by Georg Jacoby and starring Theo Lingen, Fita Benkhoff and Helga Neuner. The film's sets were designed by the art director Leo Metzenbauer. It is loosely based on the play of the same title by Gustaf Kadelburg, which had previously been adapted into a 1935 German film The Schimeck Family.

== Cast ==
- Theo Lingen as Anton Kaltenbach
- Fita Benkhoff as Bernhardine, seine Frau
- Helga Neuner as Dora, ihre Tochter
- Adrienne Gessner as Tante Rosa
- Ernst Waldow as Josef Weigel
- Peer Schmidt as Dr. Kiesling, Advokat
- Oskar Sima as Johannes Zawadil
- Lucie Englisch as Frau Schimek
- Helga Martin as Hedwig Schimek, ihre Tochter
- Günther Fischer as Willy Schimek, ihr Sohn
- Rudi Priefer as Franzl Schimek, ihr Sohn
- Josef Meinrad as Baumann, Tischler
- Ernst Waldbrunn as Richter
- Cissy Kraner as Singer
- Ernst Meister as Edi, ein junger Mann aus 'besserem Haus'

== Bibliography ==
- Von Dassanowsky, Robert. Austrian Cinema. McFarland & Co, 2005.
