= Helga Neuner =

German actress

Helga Neuner (10 June 1940) is a German actress.

== Life ==
Neuner was born in Munich. During her school years, she took singing lessons and received dance training. After finishing school, she completed an acting education. She first gained theater experience with several boulevard theatres. At the beginning of the 1960s, she briefly played theater in Bremen. This was followed by engagements in Munich and Berlin; guest performances took her to Zurich and Vienna. Neuner also performed at the Ruhrfestspiele Recklinghausen.

Neuner had her first film role in 1954 under the direction of Rudolf Schündler in the operetta adaptation Viktoria und ihr Husar. In 1956 she played the role of the pretty waitress Afra, who is regarded by Wally as a rival for the favor of the hunter Josef in the home movie The Vulture Wally at the side of Barbara Rütting. In 1958 she impersonated the role of Heiderl Tschöll, one of the three attractive daughters of the master glass-maker Tschöll, in the operetta film The House of Three Girls. In 1960 she took the role of the dancer Ann in the then controversial horror film Ein Toter hing im Netz.

Starting from 1960, Neuner played in altogether 23 episodes the role of the secretary Helga Schneider in the family series Die Firma Hesselbach. Neuner initially worked until episode 10, had a fling with "Betriebs-Playboy" and later authorized signatory Fred Lindner (Joachim Engel-Denis) in the series, then married Willi Hesselbach (Joost Siedhoff) and went with him to the United States. From episode 30 on, she played in the series again until the end of the second season in 1963. In the series she returned on the occasion of the wedding of Heidi Hesselbach with Fred Lindner.

After completion of the shooting for Die Firma Hesselbach, Neuner gave up her acting career in 1963 and withdrew largely into private life.

Neuner was married to the film composer Rolf Alexander Wilhelm, the brother of the director Kurt Wilhelm.

== Filmography ==
- Victoria and Her Hussar (1954)
- The Vulture Wally (1956)
- The Schimeck Family (1957)
- The House of Three Girls(1958)
- Horrors of Spider Island (1960)
- Die Firma Hesselbach (1960–1963)
