= Lilac Time =

Lilac Time may refer to:

- Lilac Time, a 1917 play by Jane Cowl and Jane Murfin; basis for the film
- Lilac Time (operetta) or Das Dreimäderlhaus, a 1922 operetta
- Lilac Time (film), a 1928 American silent romantic war film
- The Lilac Time, a British alternative rock band
  - The Lilac Time (album), a 1987 album by the band
- The Lilac Time, a 2008 album by Pelle Carlberg

== See also ==
- "Jeannine, I Dream of Lilac Time", theme song for the 1928 film
- Lilac Time in Lombard, an annual festival in Lombard, Illinois, US
