= Srećko Albini =

Croatian composer and director

- Born: 10 December 1869; Županja, Kingdom of Croatia-Slavonia
- Died: 18 April 1933 (aged 63); Zagreb, Yugoslavia
- Other name: Felix Albini
- Occupations: Composer; Conductor; Music publisher

Srećko (Felix) Albini (10 December 1869 – 18 April 1933) was a Croatian composer, conductor, and music publisher. He was primarily known for his operettas, some of which were adapted into English and performed in London and New York.

== Life and career ==
Albini was born in Županja. He trained in music in Vienna and in Graz, but at the wishes of his family also graduated from a business college. His first engagement as a conductor was for the municipal theatres in Graz, where he worked from 1893 to 1895. He then became a conductor at the Croatian National Theatre in Zagreb, where he remained for the next eight years and composed his first stage work, the three-act opera Maričon. Set to a libretto by Milan Smrekar, it had a nationalistic theme and incorporated traditional Croatian folk music and dances. Maričon premiered at the Croatian National Theatre in 1901 and received a very favourable review from Die Musik.

The National Theatre's resident opera company suspended its activities between 1903 and 1909, and Albini moved to Vienna, where he continued composing and conducting. He returned to the National Theatre in 1909, serving there as both a conductor and a stage director until 1919. However, he had ceased his activities as a composer after 1909. Albini went on to become a music publisher and also founded and ran the Croatian Copyright Centre. He died in Zagreb at the age of 63.

== Works ==
According to the Croatian musicologist Ivan Zivanović, Albini's music combined "an exuberant melodic invention and skillful sense of drama [that] transcended the musical and dramatic limitations characteristic of operetta of his time." Albini's operettas include:

- Der Nabob, operetta in 3 acts, libretto by Leopold Krenn; premiered at the Carltheater, Vienna, 1905
- Madame Troubadour, vaudeville-operetta in 3 acts, libretto by Béla Jenbach and Robert Pohl; premiered at the Croatian National Theatre, Zagreb, 1907 (Note: Also ran for 80 performances in 1910 at Nazimova's 39th Street Theatre in New York in an English adaptation by Joseph W. Herbert)
- Baron Trenck, comic operetta in 3 acts, libretto by Alfred Maria Willner and Robert Bodanzky; premiered at the Altes Stadttheater, Leipzig, 1908 (Note: Also performed in an English adaptation by Frederick Franklin Schrader and Henry Blossom at London's Whitney Theatre in 1911 and New York's Casino Theatre in 1912)
- Die Barfußtänzerin, operetta in 2 acts, libretto by Béla Jenbach; premiered at the Altes Stadttheater, Leipzig, 1909 (Note: Also performed in Italian as La danzatrice scalza at Teatro La Fenice in Venice in 1921)
- Die kleine Baronesse, operetta in 1 act, libretto by Robert Bodanzky; premiered at the Apollo-Theater, Vienna, 1909
