= KlangBogen Wien =

KlangBogen Wien was an annual festival offering a month of opera productions and classical concerts at different venues in the city of Vienna from 1995 to 2006. There was a range from early to contemporary operas, and from medieval chamber music to experimental 21st century compositions. In prior years the festival has included performances of Don Quixote, La bohème and Dialogues des Carmélites at Theater an der Wien, the new opera house in the city. The festivities concluded with a concert by the Vienna Philharmonic Orchestra in the Wiener Musikverein's Golden Hall.
