= The Count of Luxembourg (1957 film) =

1957 film

- German film poster
- German: Der Graf von Luxemburg
- Directed by: Werner Jacobs
- Written by: Robert Bodanzky (libretto); Fritz Böttger; Willibald Eser; Rudolf S. Joseph; A. M. Willner (operetta)
- Based on: The Count of Luxemburg by Franz Lehár
- Produced by: Artur Brauner; Carl Szokoll
- Starring: Gerhard Riedmann; Renate Holm; Gunther Philipp
- Cinematography: Friedl Behn-Grund
- Edited by: Annemarie Rokoss; Walter Wischniewsky
- Music by: Franz Lehár (operetta)
- Production company: CCC Film
- Distributed by: Constantin Film
- Release date: 18 December 1957
- Running time: 91 minutes
- Country: West Germany
- Language: German

The Count of Luxembourg (German: Der Graf von Luxemburg) is a 1957 West German musical comedy film directed by Werner Jacobs and starring Gerhard Riedmann, Renate Holm and Gunther Philipp. It is based on the 1909 operetta The Count of Luxembourg by Franz Lehár.

It was made at the Spandau Studios in Berlin and on location in Croatia. The film's sets were designed by the art directors Emil Hasler and Paul Markwitz. It was shot using Eastmancolor.

== Cast ==
- Gerhard Riedmann as René, Count of Luxembourg
- Renate Holm as Angèle, singer
- Gunther Philipp as Brissard, painter
- Susi Nicoletti as Caroline, Hereditary Countess of Luxembourg
- Gustav Knuth as Prince Basil Basilowitsch
- Alice Kessler as Fritzi
- Ellen Kessler as Franzi
- Hans Olden as Paul Pawlowitsch, envoy
- Erika von Thellmann as Frau Pawlowitsch
- Theodor Danegger as Grand duke Michail Michailowitsch
- Hugo Lindinger as van Megeren, Gerichtsvollzieher
- Herbert Weissbach as Hassling, Gerichtsvollzieher
- Gerold Wanke as Robert, Bildhauer
- Gustl Weishappel as Albert, painter
- Clarissa Stolz as Sophia Laurentia
- Germaine Damar as Brissard's model
