= Frederick Franklin Schrader =

American journalist and dramatist

Frederick Franklin Schrader (27 October 1857 Free and Hanseatic City of Hamburg - 1943) was an American journalist and dramatist.

== Biography ==
He was the son of a United States citizen, and came to the United States with his parents in 1869. He was educated in public schools in Davenport, Iowa, and St. Joseph, Missouri, and received academic training in Hamburg.

Throughout his life, Schrader held the following positions: managing editor of the Denver Republican, 1879–1881; of the St. Joseph Herald, 1882–1884; manager of Tootle's Opera House of St. Joseph, 1884–1886; Pope's Theatre of St. Louis, 1886–1887; secretary of the Board of Trade of St. Joseph, 1887–1891; Washington correspondent of the St. Louis Globe-Democrat, 1891–1894; assistant and acting secretary, Republican Congressional Committee, 1896–1900; author of Republican Text Book, 1898; political writer Washington Post, 1894–1896, and then dramatic editor, 1901–1906; correspondent for the Kansas City Journal after 1896; on the literary staff of David Belasco, 1906–1909; dramatic editor of the New York Globe, 1909–1910; editor of the New York Dramatic Mirror; president of a publishing company, 19 August 1912 to 9 September 1916; co-founder with George S. Viereck of The Fatherland, August 1914; and for some time associate editor and later editor of Issues and Events.

In December 1918, before a Senate committee, Schrader denied ever profiting from, or even being aware of, the $100,000 which Deputy Attorney General Alfred Becker alleged the German government paid to The Fatherland.

== Family ==
On June 6, 1879, he married Anna McNulty. She died on February 16, 1894, and on November 6, 1895, he married Marie R. Bailey.

== Works ==
=== Plays ===
- At the French Ball (Fanny Rice)
- The Man from Texas
- Proposal by Proxy
- Hawkeye
- Checkmate
- The Modern Lady Godiva
- At the French Ball
- Nicolette, comic opera, music by Irenée Bergé, translated into Bohemian and produced in New York, 25 December 1915
- Corsica, music drama in one act, music by Irenée Bergé, produced in 1910

He was the lyricist for Baron Trenck, produced in London (1911) and New York City (1912).

=== Books ===
- Handbook; Political, Statistical and Sociological, for German Americans and All Other Americans Who Have Not Forgotten the History and Traditions of Their Country and Who Believe in the Principles of Washington, Jefferson and Lincoln, (New York, 1916)
- 1683-1920. The Fourteen Points and What Became of Them; Foreign Propaganda in the Public Schools; Rewriting the History of the United States; the Espionage Act and How it Worked ... (etc. etc.) and a Thousand Other Topics, New York: Concord Publishing Co., 1920.
- Prussia and the United States: Frederick the Great's influence on the American Revolution, Hoboken, New Jersey: The Concord Society, 1923.
- The Germans in the making of America (with a foreword by Edward F. McSweeney), Stratford Company, 1924; new edition: Dodo Press (March 2007) ISBN 1-4067-0841-0
- The Concordat of 1933 between Holy See and German State (pamphlet), 1933

=== Translations ===
- Max Nordau, Freie Liebe (Paris Sketches)
- Otto Ruppius, José, a novel
