= Norman Greene =

American athlete (1973–2022)

Personal information
- Born: July 12, 1973 Killeen, Texas
- Died: January 26, 2022 (aged 48) Columbia, South Carolina
- Resting place: Sumter, South Carolina
- Education: University of South Carolina; Sumter High School

Sport
- Sport: American College Football, track and field
- Position: defensive back, sprint (running)
- University team: South Carolina Gamecocks football

Norman Christopher Greene (July 12, 1973 – January 26, 2022) was an American athlete notable for his achievements in collegiate football and high school track and field. Born in Fort Hood, Texas, Greene excelled in both sports during his formative years, eventually becoming a starting free safety for the South Carolina Gamecocks football team while maintaining his reputation in track and field. In 1991, Greene was the top-rated high school hurdler in the nation, according to Track and Field News.

== Early life and education ==
Greene was one of four children born to Geneva H. Greene and the late Staff Sgt. Bobby G. Greene. He attended Sumter High School, graduating as part of the Class of 1991.

Greene's athletic prowess became evident during his high school years, where he was a starting defensive back for the football team and earned recognition as a member of the 1990 Shrine Bowl team. During that week leading up to the game in Charlotte, NC, Greene was also voted defensive unit captain by his teammates. As a high school junior, he was also named The Sumter Item's high school football "Player of the Year" in 1990. As a senior, Greene had 108 tackles and one interception and helped his team win the South Carolina High School state AAAA football championship. He was also responsible for secondary calls for the school's defensive team. He was named to the All-Southern team by the Orlando Sentinel. He was named in the Top 100 by the High School Sports Report and in the Top 12 by South Carolina Independent Schools Athletic Association.

== Track and field achievements ==
Greene garnered acclaim for his accomplishments in track and field at Sumter High School, securing consecutive state titles including 1988 and 1991 in both the 110 meter high hurdles & 300 meter intermediate hurdles. Greene was also a member of three state champion relay teams. His senior season saw him set the national record in the 110 high hurdles. Greene was named 1991 Male Athlete of the Year by Sumter School District 17. In recognition of his athletic achievements, Greene was inducted into both the Sumter Sports Hall of Fame and the Sumter High Athletic Hall of Fame.

Track Achievements
Year	Event	Time	Location	Place
1989	110HH	15:04	Sumter - Coach's Classic	1st
	300IH	41.8	Sumter - Coach's Classic	1st
1991	110HH	13.65*	4A SC State High School Championship	1st
	110HH	13.57		1st
	110HH	13.52*	Orlando, FL -Orlando Sentinel Golden South Classic (1991)	1st
	110HH	13.82	Los Angeles - National Scholastic Outdoor	1st
	110HH		Chicago - Keebler Invitational	
	110HH		Minnesota - TAC Junior National Championship	
	55H	7.51	Syracuse - National High School Indoor Championships	6th

In the finals of the 1991 National High School Indoor Championships, after coming in first during the qualifiers, Greene cut his leg on the hurdle and came in sixth place overall.

== Collegiate career ==
In February 1991, Greene signed his letter of intent to continue his athletic endeavors at the University of South Carolina, where he continued to excel in football as a starting free safety for the Gamecocks.

Greene was forced to start as a true freshman when senior Leon Harris was dismissed from the team, prior to the start of the season. Greene scored his first touchdown as a defender in his first game against the Duke Blue Devils.

Greene suffered a concussion while playing the free safety position.

== Career and personal life ==
Beyond athletics, Greene served as an assistant coach for Spring Valley High School's football team, was employed at Blue Fin Restaurant in Columbia at the time of his passing.

Greene died on January 26, 2022, in Columbia, South Carolina.
