= Robert Bodanzky =

Austrian writer (1879–1923)

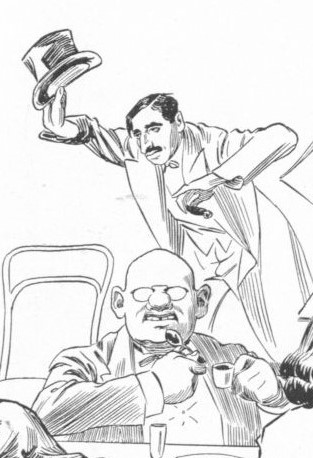
- A portrait of Danton
- Born: Isidor Bodanskie; 8 March 1879; Vienna, Austria-Hungary
- Died: 2 November 1923 (aged 44); Berlin, Weimar Republic
- Occupation: writer
- Movement: anarcho communism
- Relatives: Artur Bodanzky (brother)

Robert Bodanzky, also known as Danton (born Isidor Bodanskie, 20 March 1879 – 2 November 1923), was an Austrian journalist, playwright, poet and artist. While he became famous for his apolitical poems before World War I, he turned an anarchist communist afterwards, writing political essays, plays and poems. He was the brother of the opera conductor Artur Bodanzky.

== Works ==
- Mitislaw der Moderne, Glockenverlag, Vienna, 1907 (with Fritz Grünbaum, music by Franz Lehár)
- Baron Trenck, 1908 (with Alfred Maria Willner, music by Felix Albini)
- Der Liebeswalzer, 1908 (with Fritz Grünbaum, music by Karl Michael Ziehrer)
- Der Graf von Luxemburg, 1909 (with Alfred Maria Willner and Leo Stein, music by Franz Lehár)
- Ein Herbstmanöver, 1909, music by Emmerich Kálmán)
- Gipsy Love, 1910 (with Alfred Maria Willner, music by Franz Lehár)
- Die schöne Risette, 1910 (with Alfred Maria Willner, music by Leo Fall)
- Eva, 1911 (with Alfred Maria Willner, music by Franz Lehár)
- Endlich allein, 1914 (with Alfred Maria Willner, music by Franz Lehár)
- Rund um die Liebe, 1914 (with Friedrich Thelen, music by Oscar Straus)
- Eine Ballnacht, 1918 (with Leopold Jacobson, music by Oscar Straus)
- Der Tanz ins Glück, 1920 (with Bruno Hardt-Warden, music by Robert Stolz); British adaption: Whirled into Happiness (1922); US adaption: Sky High (1925)
- Revolutionäre Dichtungen und Politische Essays, Verlag Erkenntns und Befreiung, 1925, Vienna, Klosterneuburg

== Filmography ==
- Éva, directed by Alfréd Deésy (Hungary, 1919)
- The Count of Luxembourg, directed by Arthur Gregor (1926)
- The Rogue Song, directed by Lionel Barrymore (1930, based on Gypsy Love)
- Eva, directed by Johannes Riemann (Austria, 1935)
- Tanz ins Glück, directed by Alfred Stöger (Austria, 1951)
- The Count of Luxembourg, directed by Werner Jacobs (West Germany, 1957)
- The Count of Luxembourg, directed by Wolfgang Glück (West Germany, 1972)

== Bibliography ==
- Heuer, Renate, ed. (1995). "Bodanzky, Robert". Lexikon deutsch-jüdischer Autoren (in German). Vol. 3. Munich: K.G. Saur. pp. 245–248. doi:10.1515/9783110975697. ISBN 978-3-11-097569-7.
- Robert Bodanzky. In: Werner Portmann, Siegbert Wolf: „Ja, ich kämpfte“. Von Revolutionsträumen, 'Luftmenschen' und Kindern des Schtetls. Unrast, Münster 2006, ISBN 3-89771-452-3 (in German).
