= Heinrich Berté =

Austria-Hungarian composer of operas and operettas

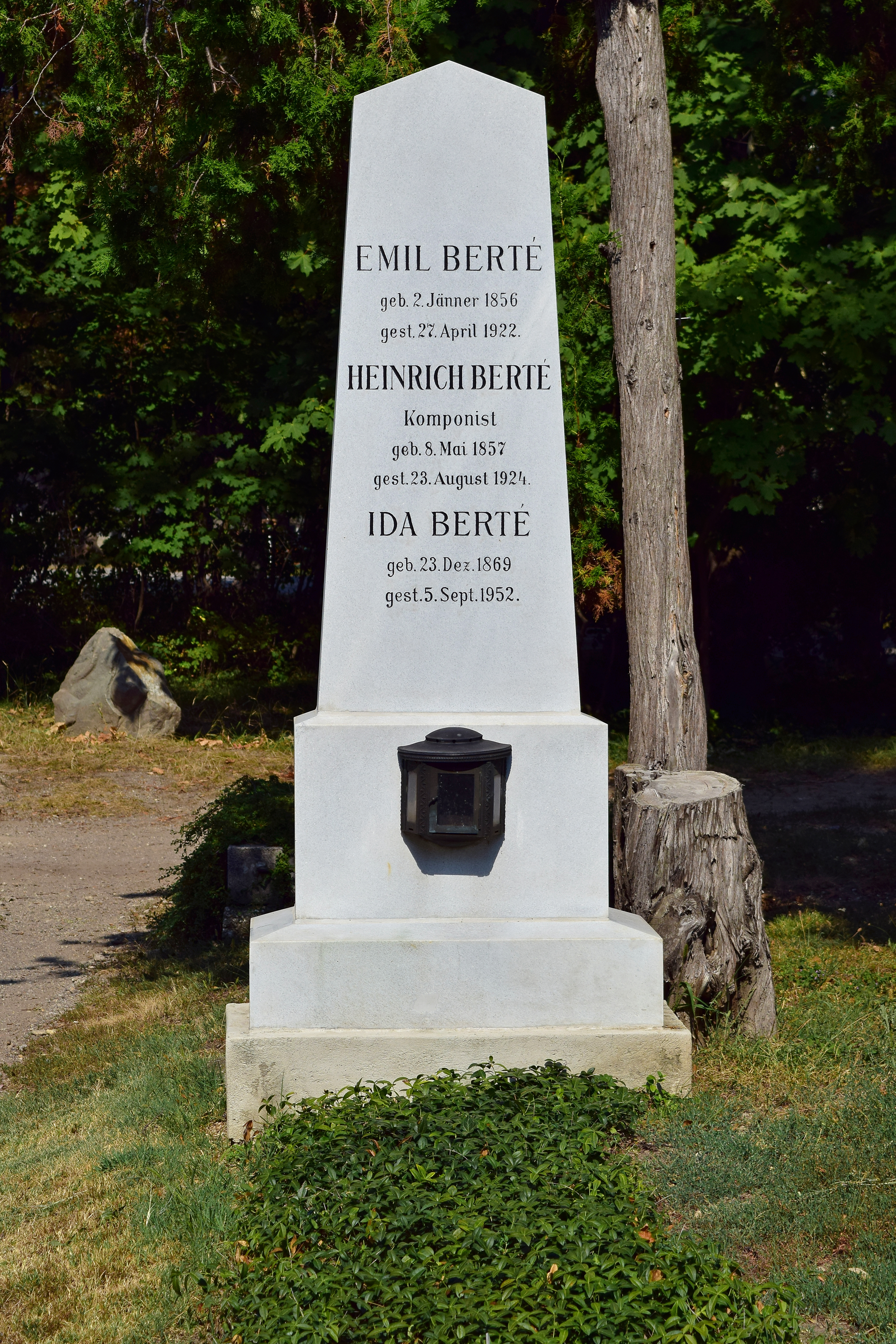
Grave of Berté at the Vienna Central Cemetery

Heinrich Berté ([berˈte]), born Heinrich Bettelheim (8 May 1857 – 23 August 1924) was an Austrian-Hungarian composer of operas and operettas.

== Life ==
Heinrich Berté was born in Galgócz, Hungary (now Hlohovec, Slovakia) in a Jewish family. At the beginning of his career, he was a relatively unsuccessful composer of ballets and an opera. In 1911 he was offered a libretto by the writer Alfred Maria Willner for an opera about Franz Schubert, based on the novel, Schwammerl by Rudolf Hans Bartsch, but this was turned down and he was told to use Schubert's music in a pastiche instead. On 15 January 1916, his first performed work, an arrangement of Franz Schubert's Das Dreimäderlhaus was premiered in the Raimund Theater in Vienna, Gretl Schörg's voice was discovered during the run. The operetta was translated into 22 languages and in 1921 it opened as Blossom Time in New York City, in 1922 as Lilac Time in London), and was performed in over 60 countries, it was a worldwide success. The operetta was filmed several times. Berté could not build on this success; his second Schubert operetta was unsuccessful. He died in Perchtoldsdorf, Austria, aged 66.

== Works ==
=== Opera ===
- Schneeflocke (Vienna, 1896)

=== Operettas ===
- Bureau Malicone (Vienna, 1891)
- Der neue Bürgermeister (Vienna, 1904) - libretto by Ernst Gettke
- Die Millionenbraut (Munich, 1904)
- Der Stadtregent (Munich, 1905)
- Der kleine Chevalier (Dresden, 1907)
- Der schöne Gardist (Breslau, 1907)
- Der Glücksnarr (Vienna, 1908)
- Kreolenblut (Hamburg, 1911)
- Der Märchenprinz (Hannover, 1914)
- Das Dreimäderlhaus (Vienna, 1916; with music by Franz Schubert)
- Lenz und Liebe (Budapest, 1917; with music by Franz Schubert)
- Die drei Kavaliere (Vienna, 1919)
- Coulissengeheimnisse (Hamburg, 1920
