= Lilian Sukis =

Canadian operatic soprano

Lilian Sukis (born 29 June 1939, Kaunas) is a Canadian operatic soprano of Lithuanian birth. Her family fled the Soviet occupation to Germany during World War II, and then to Canada in 1950. She earned a BA from McMaster University and a diploma from the University of Toronto, and made her professional opera debut in 1964 as Kate Pinkerton in Giacomo Puccini's Madama Butterfly with the Canadian Opera Company. In 1965 she sang the role of Countess Almaviva in Wolfgang Amadeus Mozart's The Marriage of Figaro at the Stratford Festival. That same year she became a pupil at the Metropolitan Opera Studio and School. She made her debut at the Met in 1966 in Parsifal. In 1969 she became a member of the Bavarian State Opera where she remained for more than 20 years. She has also appeared as a guest artist with several major opera houses and opera festivals internationally, including the Bayreuth Festival, the Frankfurt Opera, Graz, the Hamburg State Opera, the Salzburg Festival, and the Vienna State Opera among others.
