= Wolfgang Glück =

Austrian film director and screenwriter (1929–2023)

Wolfgang Glück (29 September 1929 – 13 December 2023) was an Austrian film director and screenwriter. His film '38 – Vienna Before the Fall (1987) was nominated for the Academy Award for Best Foreign Language Film at the 59th Academy Awards. Glück died on 13 December 2023, at the age of 94.

== Selected filmography ==
As director

- Endangered Girls (1958)
- Girls for the Mambo-Bar (1959)
- Traumnovelle (1969, TV film) — (based on Dream Story)
- Doppelspiel in Paris (1972, TV film)
- Agent aus der Retorte (1972, TV film)
- The Count of Luxemburg (1972) — (based on Der Graf von Luxemburg)
- Wunschloses Unglück (1974, TV film) — (based on A Sorrow Beyond Dreams)
- Das Gebell (1976, TV film) — (based on a short story by Ingeborg Bachmann)
- Diener und andere Herren (1978, TV film) — (based on short stories by O. Henry, P. G. Wodehouse and W. Somerset Maugham)
- Student Gerber (1981) — (based on the novel Young Gerber by Friedrich Torberg)
- Tatort: Mord in der Oper (1981, TV series episode)
- Brigitta (1982, TV film) — (based on a novella by Adalbert Stifter)
- '38 – Vienna Before the Fall (1986) — (based on a novel by Friedrich Torberg)

As actor

- Adventure in Vienna (1952)
- Red Sun (1970), as Mercedes driver
- Funny Games (1997), as Robert
