= Rudolf Hans Bartsch =

Austrian military officer and writer (1873–1952)

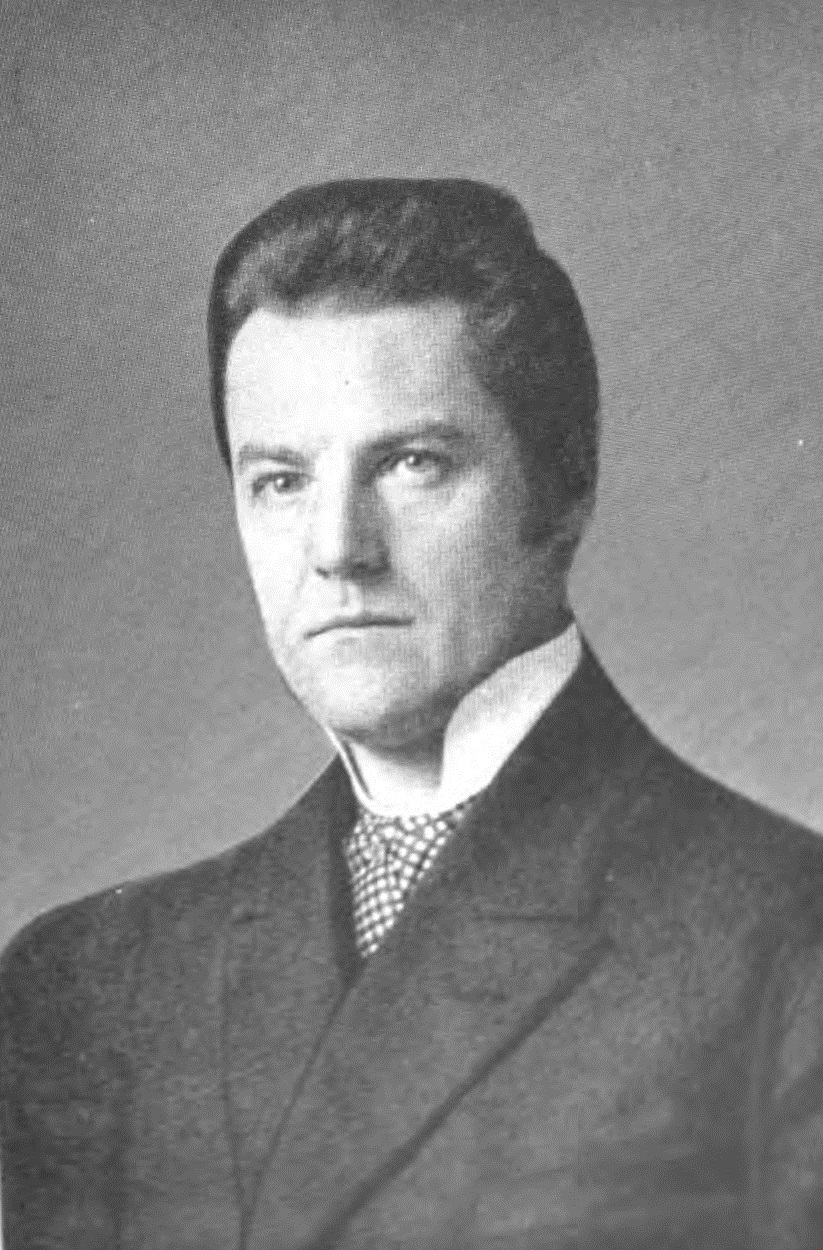
- Born: 11 February 1873; Graz, Austria-Hungary
- Died: 7 February 1952 (aged 78); St. Peter, First Republic of Austria

Rudolf Hans Bartsch (11 February 1873 – 7 February 1952) was an Austrian military officer and writer.

== Life and work ==
Bartsch wrote novels and short stories, which, according to today's critics often glorify the old nostalgic Austria. Gero von Wilpert ( for a very fertile, non-critical narrator of the old Austria – kind with sentimental novels and short stories, cute and bittersweet love stories of playful levity) ... His novel about Franz Schubert, Schwammerl (mushrooms), one of the most successful Austrian books before World War II, served in 1916 as a template to the operetta Das Dreimäderlhaus by the composer Heinrich Berté, which was also filmed several times.

Bartsch adapted the mythological poem Autumn Chorus to Pan, from ancient works about the god Pan and the seasons. It tells the signs of the cycle of life and the transience of the earth in the sense of the changing seasons. The work gained greater prominence when it was set to music in January 1911 by Joseph Marx, who was, at the time, one of the most played song composers of Austria. It was set as a one-movement cantata for mixed choir, boys' choir, organ and large orchestra. This is the first orchestral work written by Marx. The Autumn Chorus to Pan was recorded in June 2008 by the BBC Symphony Orchestra & Chorus under Jiří Bělohlávek together with other choral works by Joseph Marx for the British label Chandos Records.

Streets were named after him in his hometown of Graz plus in Leibnitz and Mureck.

== Awards and honors ==
- Freeman the City of Graz, 1932
- Peter Rosegger Prize, 1951

== Novels ==
- Zwölf aus der Steiermark, 1908
- Elisabeth Kött, 1909
- Schwammerl. Schubert-Roman, 1912
- Das deutsche Leid. Ein Landschafts-Roman, 1912
- Die Geschichte von der Hannerl und ihren Liebhabern, 1913
- Der letzte Student, Ullstein, Berlin 1913
- ER. Ein Buch der Andacht, 1915
- Der Flieger, 1915
- Frau Utta und der Jäger, 1915
- Lukas Rabesam, 1917
- Der junge Dichter. Roman, 1918
- Heidentum. Die Geschichte eines Vereinsamten, 1919
- Ewiges Arkadien!, 1920
- Seine Jüdin oder Jakob Böhmes Schusterkugel, 1921
- Ein Landstreicher, 1921
- Die Haindlkinder
- Das Tierchen. Die Geschichte einer kleinen Grisette, 1922
- Die Salige
- Venus und das Mädchengrab. Liebesgeschichte eines Sonderlings, 1926
- Die Verliebten und ihre Stadt, 1927
- Die Apotheke zur blauen Gans. Roman aus seltsamem Grenzland, 1928
- Wild und frei. Thema mit Variationen, 1928
- Der große alte Kater. Eine Schopenhauer-Geschichte, 1929
- Die Verführerin. Eine Wiener Geschichte, 1930
- Der große und der kleine Klaus, 1931
- Das Lächeln der Marie Antoinette, 1932
- Ein Deutscher. Zsgestellt aus Fragmenten der Erinnergen des Christoph Magnus von Raithenau, 1933
- Der große Traum der kleinen Wienerin. Eine heitere Staatsaktion, 1936
- Brüder im Sturm, 1940
- Wenn Majestäten lieben, 1949

== Short stories and novellas ==
- Bittersüße Liebesgeschichten, 1910
- Vom sterbenden Rokoko, 1913
- Unerfüllte Geschichten
- Frauen. 3 Novellen, 1918
- Musik. 3 Novellen, 1923
- Novellen, 1924
- Histörchen, 1925

== Plays ==
- Ohne Gott. Die Tragödie einer Mutter, 1915
- Fernes Schiff. 3 Akte (6 Bilder) aus dem Leben des großen Kolonisators John Smith, 1934

== Essays ==
- Das Glück des deutschen Menschen, 1927

== Literature ==
- Theodor Lessing: Rudolf Hans Bartsch. Ein letztes deutsches Naturdenkmal. Staackmann, Leipzig 1927.
- Hans Dolf: Rudolf Hans Bartsch. Bruder des großen Pan. Eine Studie über den Dichter mit einer Auswahl aus seinen Werken. Leykam, Graz 1964.
- Sophie Rahaberger: Das religiöse Problem bei Rudolf Hans Bartsch. Univ. Diss., Graz 1959.
