= Johann Michael Vogl =

Austrian opera singer

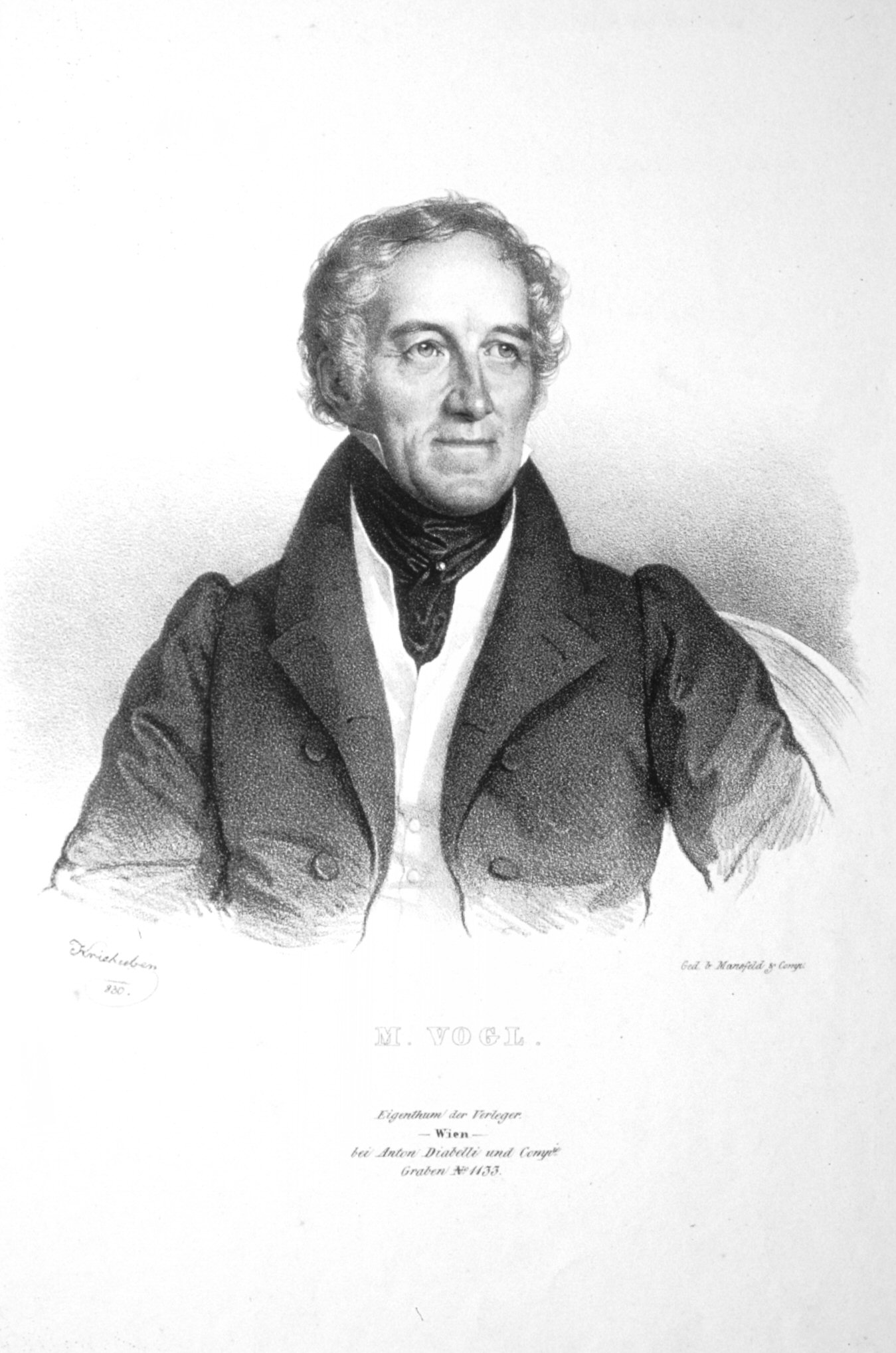
Johann Michael Vogl, lithograph by Josef Kriehuber

Johann Michael Vogl (August 10, 1768 – November 19, 1840), was an Austrian baritone singer and composer. Though famous in his day, he is remembered mainly for his close professional relationship and friendship with composer Franz Schubert.

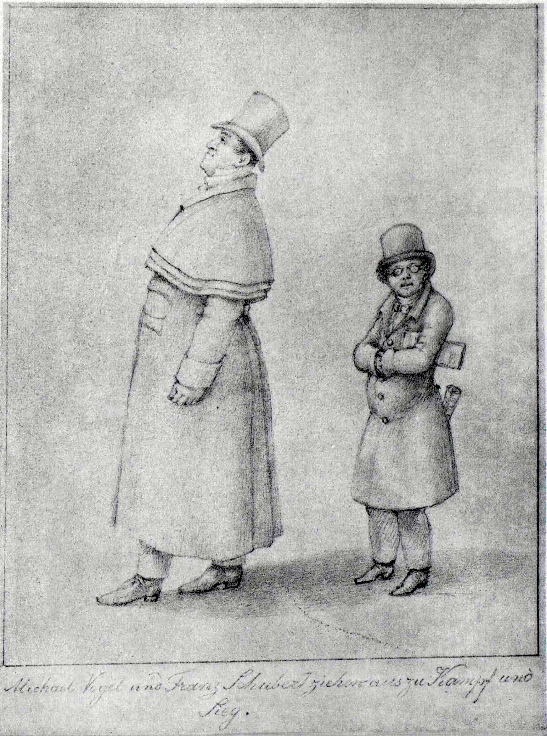
Vogl and Franz Schubert, caricatured by Franz von Schober

Vogl was born in Steyr. As a young man he enrolled at the Gymnasium at Kremsmünster, where he studied languages, philosophy, and sang in several musical productions by his friend Franz Süßmayr (the same man who completed Mozart's Requiem). In 1786 Vogl went to Vienna to study, and later to practice law. In 1795 he debuted at the Vienna Hofoper, and quickly attracted a following for both his acting capability and the beauty of his voice.

In 1813, Franz Schubert attended a performance of Gluck's Iphigénie en Tauride in which Vogl sang the role of Orestes; Schubert never forgot the experience and determined to write for Vogl. The following year, when Vogl sang the role of Pizarro at the premiere of the final version of Beethoven's Fidelio, it is said that the 17-year-old Schubert actually sold his schoolbooks in order to afford a ticket.

When composer and singer finally met, in 1817, Vogl was as impressed with the quality of Schubert's music as Schubert was with Vogl's singing. Schubert wrote many of his subsequent songs with Vogl in mind. One of their early successes was an 1821 performance of Erlkönig, prior to its publication and to significant popular acclaim.

Rarely in music history has the relationship of a composer and a specific singer been so musically productive. Vogl continued to sing Schubert's music after the death of his friend in 1828, famously singing a complete performance of Winterreise accompanied by the pianist Emanuel Mikschik shortly before his own death on the twelfth anniversary of the death of his friend. He died in Vienna.

== See also ==
- List of Austrians in music
