= Das Dreimäderlhaus =

Viennese pastiche operetta with music by Franz Schubert

Das Dreimäderlhaus or Blossom Time or Lilac Time
- Fritz Schrödter as Schubert and Anny Rainer as Hannerl, 1916
- Music: Franz Schubert
- Lyrics: Alfred Maria Willner; Heinz Reichert
- Book: Alfred Maria Willner; Heinz Reichert
- Basis: 1912 novel Schwammerl by Rudolf Hans Bartsch
- Productions: 1916 Vienna; 1916 Berlin; 1921 Paris; 1921 Broadway; 1922 West End

Das Dreimäderlhaus (House of the Three Girls), adapted into English-language versions as Blossom Time and Lilac Time, is a Viennese pastiche operetta with music by Franz Schubert, rearranged by Heinrich Berté (1857–1924), and a libretto by Alfred Maria Willner and Heinz Reichert. The work gives a fictionalized account of Schubert's romantic life, and the story was adapted from the 1912 novel Schwammerl by Rudolf Hans Bartsch (1873–1952). Originally the score was mostly Berté, with just one piece of Schubert's ("Ungeduld" from Die schöne Müllerin), but the producers required Berté to discard his score and create a pasticcio of Schubert music.

The original production opened at the Raimundtheater in Vienna on 15 January 1916 and ran for over 650 performances in its original run in Austria and for hundreds more in Germany, followed by many successful revivals. It starred Fritz Schrödter as Schubert and Anny Rainer as Hannerl. Schrödter was already 60 in 1916. In 1886, he had sung the part of the "Prince of Song" (i.e. Schubert) in Franz von Suppé's operetta about Schubert. The operetta spawned a sequel entitled Hannerl. Debuting during World War I, the operetta's popularity was fueled by the public's taste for nostalgia, harnessing an old-fashioned, sentimental story and Schubert's familiar music. Schubert worked hard to become a successful opera composer but found little success in this genre of music. With Das Dreimäderlhaus, ironically, his music finally became famous in a stage work.

Das Dreimäderlhaus then premiered in Paris on May 7, 1921, in a French adaptation by Hugues Delorme and Léon Abric called Chanson d'amour (Song of Love). The operetta was a success in France, and soon an English language adaption opened on Broadway as Blossom Time, with a new arrangement of Schubert's music by Sigmund Romberg and an adapted libretto by Dorothy Donnelly. This debuted at the Ambassador Theatre on September 29, 1921, where it ran for 592 performances; it was revived several times on Broadway over the next two decades. In London, the operetta was called Lilac Time, with an adapted libretto by Adrian Ross and music arranged by George H. Clutsam, using some of Berté's work. Lilac Time opened at the Lyric Theatre on December 22, 1922, and ran for 626 performances. Both the Broadway and West End versions toured extensively in subsequent decades and were frequently revived until the 1950s.

The operetta received productions in over 60 countries and was translated into numerous languages. By 1961, the piece was estimated to have played over 85,000 performances worldwide. It still receives occasional productions.

== Synopsis ==
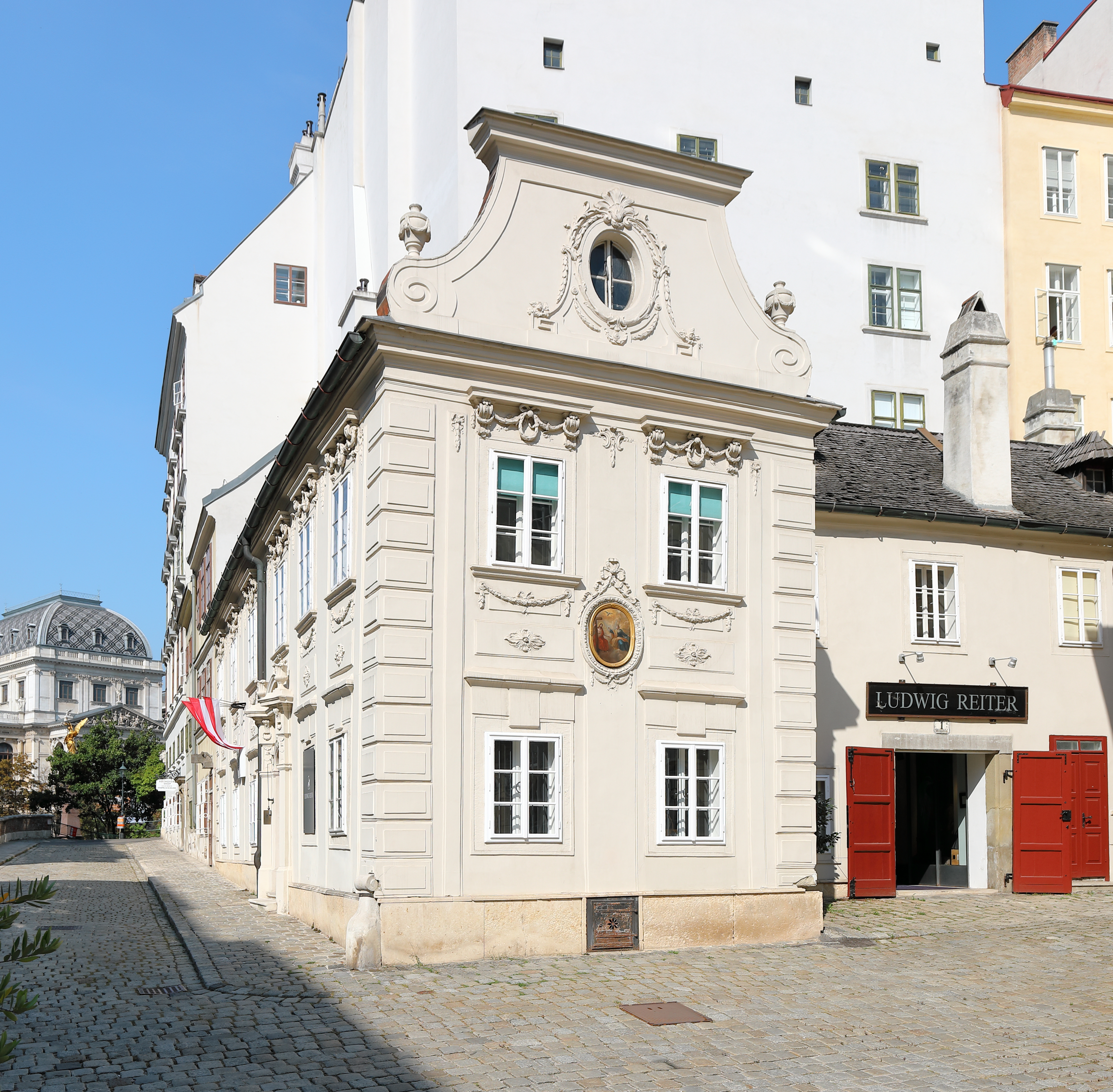
The Dreimäderlhaus in Vienna, associated with Schubert through the operetta, though he never lived here. Beethoven lived in a house behind this.

In the spring of 1826, Schubert, a poor young composer, has quarters in an old Viennese house together with two friends. The three daughters of Christian Tschöll, the court glass maker, visit the three friends. Two of the girls are in love with Schubert's roommates, and the third, Hannerl, is chaperoning her sisters. More of Schubert's friends come to visit. The father arrives in search of his daughters. Schubert's two roommates drink with Tschöll in their courtyard, underneath a Lilac tree, and he agrees to their engagements with his daughters. Schubert takes on Hannerl as his singing pupil, and although the two fall in love, they are each too shy to reveal their feelings.

A couple of months later, the first two daughters are marrying their fiancés at Tschöll's house, and the three roommates are all guests at the wedding. Actress Giuditta Grisi, the mistress of Baron Franz Schober, one of Schubert's friends, arrives. She is jealous and believes that he must be cheating on her. She assumes that Hannerl is the other woman and warns her to stay away from her man. Schubert, still unable to tell Hannerl that he loves her, instead asks Schober to sing a song that he has written for her ("Ungeduld"). Hannerl misunderstands Grisi's warning, believing it to be about Schubert rather than Schober. She turns away from the composer and falls in love with Schober.

In the Prater the following morning, everyone assembles. Eventually, Schubert ends up alone, disappointed, but consoled by Hannerl's happiness and by his music.

== English-language versions ==
=== American version: Blossom Time ===
Five years after the Vienna opening, in 1921, the Shubert brothers acquired the American rights to Das Dreimäderlhaus with a view to customising the operetta for American audiences. They hired Donnelly and Romberg (their house composer) to adapt the libretto and music. The same team, three years later, adapted Old Heidelberg to make The Student Prince, but in the case of The Student Prince, the entire score was written by Romberg, not by another composer. The Broadway production of Blossom Time opened at the Ambassador Theatre on September 29, 1921, where it ran for 592 performances, starring Bertram Peacock and Olga Cook. It became the second longest-running Broadway musical of the 1920s and, after extensive tours, played Broadway again in 1939 and 1943. The show was staged by J. C. Huffman.

Donnelly changed the character names and several of the settings. The plot follows the basic story of the original, but many significant details are changed, well-known Schubert pieces are gratuitously inserted and historically inaccurate material familiar to Americans of the era is added. For example, in Act I, Schubert writes "Ständchen" for Count Scharntoff, who plans to give it (as his own work) to his wife, who is in love with Schober. Schubert's friends arrange for Hannerl ("Mitzi" in this version) to have singing lessons with Schubert as the cover for why the other daughters are there, when the father appears. They then get him drunk so that he agrees to the double wedding. In Act III, some of Schubert's works are about to be given in a concert, but Schubert is too ill to attend. His friends return to his lodgings after the concert just before Schubert dies, surrounded by angels, as "Ave Maria" is heard.

==== Musical numbers ====
Act I

- Opening – Greta, Kupelweiser, Von Schwind, Vogel, Chorus
- Melody Triste – Bellabruna
- Three Little Maids – Mitzi, Fritzi, Kitzi, Chorus
- Serenade – Baron Franz Schober, Franz Schubert, Vogel, Kupelweiser, Von Schwind, Hansy
- My Springtime Thou Art – Baron Franz Schober, Franz Schubert, Vogel, Kupelweiser, Von Schwind, *Girls
- Song of Love – Franz Schubert, Mitzi
- Finale Act 1 – Ensemble

Act II

- Moment Musicale – Franz Schubert, Hansy, Dancer
- Love Is a Riddle – Baron Franz Schober, Binder, Erkman, Mitzi, Fritzi, Kitzi, Girls
- Let Me Awake – Bellabruna, Baron Franz Schober
- Tell Me Daisy – Mitzi, Franz Schubert
- Only One Love Ever Fills the Heart – Mitzi, Baron Franz Schober
- Finale Act 2 – Mitzi, Franz Schubert, Baron Franz Schober

Act III

- Opening – Greta
- Keep It Dark – Bellabruna, Vogel, Von Schwind, Kupelweiser
- Lonely Hearts – Mitzi, Fritzi, Kitzi, Greta, Franz Schubert
- Finale Act 3 – Ensemble

=== British version: Lilac Time ===
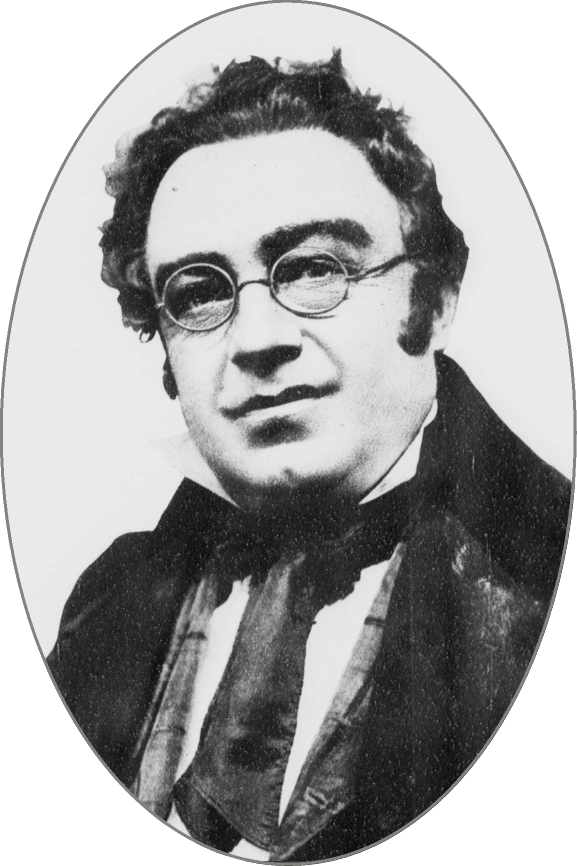
Courtice Pounds as Schubert in Lilac Time, 1922

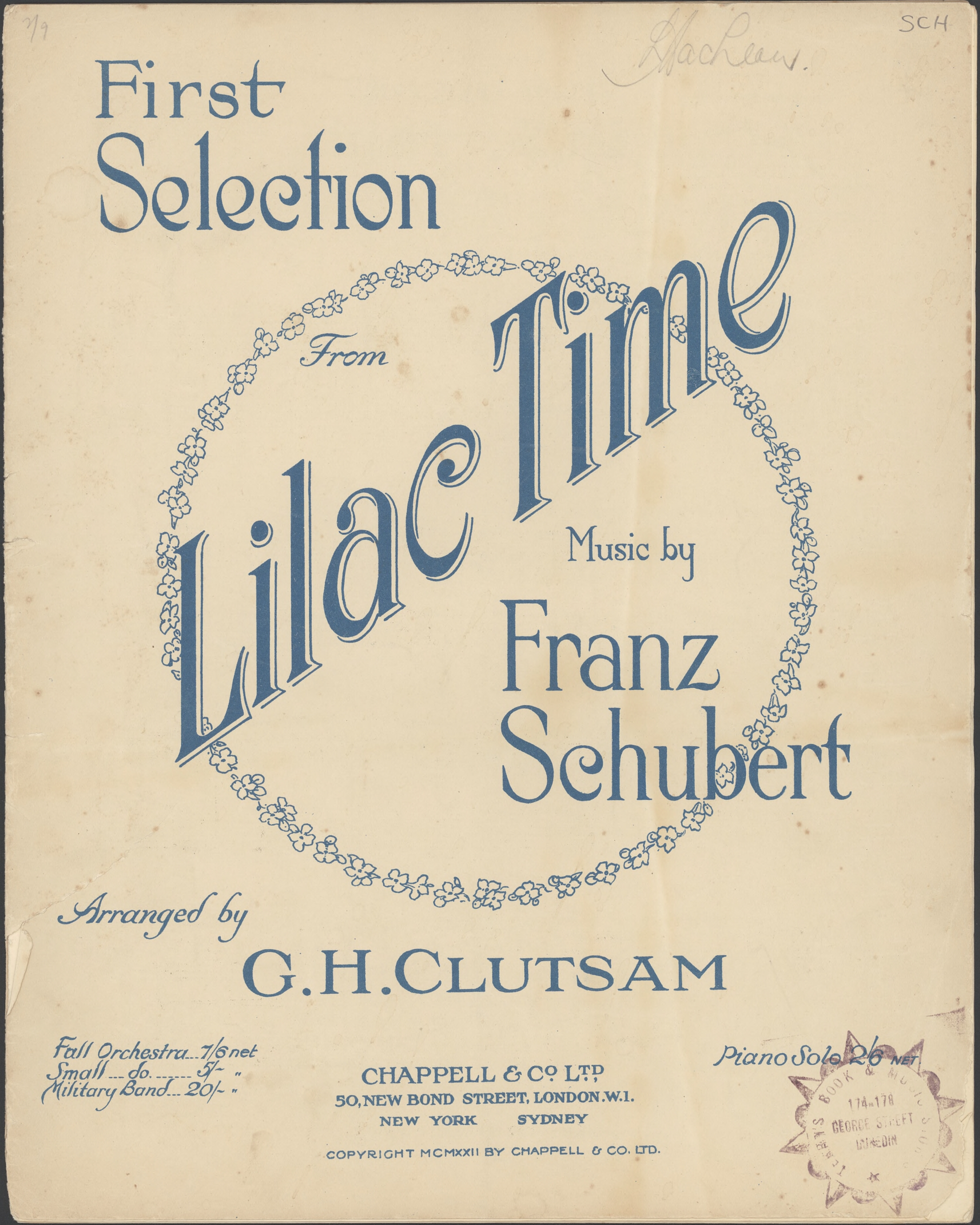
Piano sheet music of Lilac Time

In 1922, in England, Das Dreimäderlhaus was adapted as Lilac Time by Adrian Ross with music by George H. Clutsam. Clutsam, an Australian composer, moved to London and wrote, among other things, a 1912 biography of Schubert. Later, he turned to the more profitable field of composing scores for musical comedies. Clutsam's adaptation hews more closely to Berté's original than does Romberg's. Lilac Time opened at the Lyric Theatre on December 22, 1922, and ran for 626 performances, The production was directed by Dion Boucicault; the musical director was Clarence Raybould. The cast at the London premiere was:

- Mrs Grimm – Barbara Gott
- Mrs Weber – Gladys Hirst
- Rosi – Ethel Wellesby
- Novotny – Robert Nainby
- Ferdinand Binder – Griffin Campion
- Andreas Braun – Michael Cole
- Schani – Albert Websdale
- Tili – Moya Nugent
- Wili – Roy Wilson
- Lili – Clara Butterworth
- Johann Michael Vogl – Eric Morgan
- Moritz von Schwind – Herbert Cameron
- Kappel – John Kelly
- Baron Franz von Schober – Percy Heming
- Franz Schubert – Courtice Pounds
- Christian Viet – Edmund Gwenn
- Count Scharntorff – Jerrold Robertshaw
- Stingl – Ronald Pomeroy
- Mrs Viet – Florence Vie
- Sally – Queenie Young
- Signorina Fiametta Marini – Doris Clayton

Source: The Era.

The piece was revived at Daly's Theatre (1928), the Lyric (1930), and the Globe Theatre (1932). In 1933, soon after Richard Tauber had starred in a new production in German at the Aldwych Theatre, a new English production was mounted at the Alhambra Theatre. The piece was revived at the London Coliseum in 1936, the Stoll Theatre in 1942, and His Majesty's Theatre in 1949.

==== Musical numbers ====
Act I

- Opening Number – Oh the Maytime is a Gaytime
- Just a Little Ring – Lili, Tilli and Willi
- Four Jolly Brothers – Schober, Vogl, Schwind and Kappel
- Hark, Hark! The Lark! – Schubert, Schober, Vogl, Schwind and Kappel
- Under the Lilac Bough – Schubert, Schober, Vogl, Schwind and Kappel
- The Golden Song – Lili and Schubert

Act II

- Serenade – Schober
- Dance of Bridesmaids and Children
- Dream Enthralling – Schubert
- When Skies Are Blue – Lili, Tilli, Willi, Schober, Binder and Braun
- The Flower – Lili and Schibert
- Girls and Boys – Mrs Veit and Veit
- I Want To Carve Your Name – Finale act II

Act III

- Strolling Through the Morning Air – Promenade Septet
- My Sweetest Song Of All – Schubert
- Maiden Try To Smile – Lili and Schober
- I Ask the Spring Blossom Laden – Finale Act III

=== Tauber's versions ===
The tenor Richard Tauber played Schubert in several productions and tours of Das Dreimäderlhaus in Europe, first at Plauen, Germany, on 24 January 1920, and then in five performances of the original version at the Theater an der Wien in October 1921 [Neue Freie Presse]. He presented a new version of it in London in 1933, sung in German but with the English title Lilac Time, adapted by himself and Sylvio Mossée. Tauber made a film version in 1934 with Jane Baxter, and worked with Clutsam on a new version entitled Blossom Time based on the film. Clutsam included more new material in this version. It debuted on tour in the British provinces, moving to the Lyric Theatre in London on 17 March 1942.

== Recordings ==
The original London cast recorded at least four double-sided 12" acoustic recordings of highlights for the Vocalian company in 1922. The songs recorded included the following:

- K-05065 – "The Golden Song" (Butterworth and Pounds); "Underneath the Lilac Bough" (Pounds, Butterworth, Heming, H. Cameron, J. Kelly and E. Morgan)
- K-05066 – "I am Singing, I Your Lover" (Heming); "The Three Little Girls" (Butterworth)
- K-05067 – "Dream Enthralling" (Pounds); "Dear Flower, Small and Wise" (Butterworth and Pounds)
- K-05068 – "I Want to Carve Your Name" (Butterworth and Heming); "When the Lilac Bloom Uncloses" (Butterworth and Heming)

The following discs were also recorded at the same time:

- K-05064 – Lilac Time Selections 1 & 2. Regent Symphony Orchestra under the direction of Clarence Raybould of the Lyric Theatre
- X-9176 – "Dance of Bridesmaids and Children", Three Waltz Themes. Both sides by the Regent Symphony Orchestra under the direction of Raybould.

Al Goodman conducted an album of 10 selections from Blossom Time for RCA Victor in the 1940s, which was briefly issued on LP. In 1959 June Bronhill and Thomas Round recorded Lilac Time for His Master's Voice when they were stars of Sadler's Wells Opera. French Decca made a recording of the French version of the operetta (as Chanson d'Amour) in 1962 conducted by Jésus Etcheverry; the cast included Aimé Doniat as Schubert, André Mallabrera as Schober, Lina Dachary as Annette and Freda Betti as Nanette. Reader's Digest included a selection in their album A Treasury of Great Operettas, first offered for sale in 1963. Capriccio released a recording of Das Dreimäderlhaus in 1997, conducted by Alfred Walter, and Ohio Light Opera released a recording of the opera in 2002. In 2005, UK label Classics for Pleasure, a branch of EMI, released on CD the 1959 His Master's Voice recording of Lilac Time

== Sources ==
- Gaye, Freda, ed. (1967). Who's Who in the Theatre (fourteenth ed.). London: Sir Isaac Pitman and Sons. OCLC 5997224.
- Green, Stanley (1980). "Blossom Time". Encyclopedia of the Musical Theatre. Boston: Da Capo Press. ISBN 978-0-306-80113-6.
- Traubner, Richard (2003). Operetta: A Theatrical History (second ed.). London: Routledge. ISBN 978-0-415-96641-2.
