= List of operas and operettas by Franz Lehár =

This is a complete list of the operas and operettas of the Austro-Hungarian composer Franz Lehár (1870–1948).

== List of operas and operettas ==
Title	Genre	Acts	Libretto	Premiere	
Title	Genre	Acts	Libretto	Date	Venue
Der Kürassier	Opera		G. Ruther	incomplete (composed 1891/92)	
Rodrigo	Opera		Rudolf Mlčoch	unperformed (composed 1893)	
Kukuška / Tatjana	Opera	3 acts	Felix Falzari	27 November 1896	Leipzig, Stadttheater
Arabella, der Kubanerin	Operetta		G. Schmidt	incomplete (composed 1901)	
Das Klub-Baby	Operetta		Viktor Léon	incomplete (composed 1901)	
Der Klavierstimmer (Wiener Frauen)	Operetta	3 acts	Ottokar Tann-Bergler and Emil Norini	21 November 1902	Vienna, Theater an der Wien
Der Rastelbinder	Operetta	prelude and 2 acts	Viktor Léon	20 December 1902	Vienna, Carltheater
Der Göttergatte	Operetta	prelude and 2 acts	Viktor Léon and Leo Stein	20 January 1904	Vienna, Carltheater
Die Juxheirat	Operetta	3 acts	Julius Bauer	21 December 1904	Vienna, Theater an der Wien
Die lustige Witwe / The Merry Widow	Operetta	3 acts	Viktor Léon and Leo Stein, after L'attaché d'ambassade by Henri Meilhac	30 December 1905	Vienna, Theater an der Wien
Der Schlüssel zum Paradies (revised version of Der Klavierstimmer)	Operetta	3 acts	Emil Norini and Julius Horst	October 1906	Leipzig
Peter und Paul schlafen ins Schlaraffenland	Magical fairy tale	1 act	Fritz Grünbaum and Robert Bodanzky	1 December 1906	Vienna, Theater an der Wien
Mitislaw der Moderne	Operetta	1 act	Fritz Grünbaum and Robert Bodanzky	5 January 1907	Vienna, Die Hölle
Der Mann mit den drei Frauen	Operetta	3 acts	Julius Bauer, after Alexandre Bisson's Le contrôleur des wagon-lits	21 January 1908	Vienna, Theater an der Wien
Das Fürstenkind	Operetta	prelude and 3 acts	Viktor Léon, after Edmond About's Le Roi des montagnes	7 October 1909	Vienna, Johann Strauss Theater
Der Graf von Luxemburg	Operetta	prelude and 3 acts	Alfred Maria Willner and Robert Bodanzky	12 November 1909, revised version 4 March 1937	Vienna, Theater an der Wien, revised version Berlin, Theater des Volkes
Zigeunerliebe (Gypsy Love)	romantic operetta	3 acts	Alfred Maria Willner and Robert Bodanzky	8 January 1910	Vienna, Carltheater
Eva (Das Fabriksmädel)	Operetta	3 acts	Alfred Maria Willner and Robert Bodanzky	24 November 1911	Vienna, Theater an der Wien
Rosenstock und Edelweiss	Singspiel	1 act	Julius Bauer	1 December 1912	Vienna
Die ideale Gattin (revised version of Der Göttergatte)	Operetta	3 acts	Julius Brammer and Alfred Grünwald, after Die Zwillingsschwester by Ludwig Fulda	11 October 1913	Vienna, Theater an der Wien
Endlich allein	Operetta	3 acts	Alfred Maria Willner and Robert Bodanzky	30 January 1914	Vienna, Theater an der Wien
Der Sterngucker	Operetta	3 acts	Fritz Löhner-Beda	14 January 1916	Vienna
Wo die Lerche singt / Where the Lark Sings (Hungarian: A pacsirta)	Operetta	3 acts	Alfred Maria Willner and Heinz Reichert, after a sketch by Ferenc Martos after Dorf und Stadt by Charlotte Birch-Pfeiffer	1 January 1918	Budapest, Royal Opera
Die blaue Mazur	Operetta	3 acts	Leo Stein and Bela Jenbach	28 May 1920	Vienna, Theater an der Wien
Die Tangokönigin (revised version of Die ideale Gattin)	Operetta	3 acts	Julius Brammer and Alfred Grünwald	9 September 1921	Vienna, Apollo Theater
Frühling	Singspiel	1 act	Rudolf Eger	20 January 1922	Vienna
La danza delle libellule (revised version of Der Sterngucker)	Operetta	3 acts	Carlo Lombardo	14 January 1922	Milan, Teatro Lirico
Frasquita	Operetta	3 acts	Alfred Maria Willner and Heinz Reichert	12 May 1922	Vienna, Theater an der Wien
Die gelbe Jacke	Operetta	3 acts	Viktor Léon	9 February 1923	Vienna, Theater an der Wien
Libellentanz (revised version of La danza delle libellule)	Operetta		Carlo Lombardo and Alfred Maria Willner	21 March 1923	Vienna, Stadttheater
Clo-Clo	Operetta	3 acts	Béla Jenbach, after Der Schrei nach dem Kinde by Julius Horst and Alexander Engel	8 March 1924	Vienna, Bürgertheater
Paganini	Operetta	3 acts	Paul Knepler and Béla Jenbach	30 October 1925	Vienna, Johann Strauss Theater
Gigolette (revised version of La danza delle libellule)	Operetta	3 acts	Carlo Lombardo and Giovacchino Forzano	30 October 1926	Milan, Teatro Lirico
Der Zarewitsch	Operetta	3 acts	Heinz Reichert and Béla Jenbach, after Gabriela Zapolska's Carewicz	21 February 1927	Berlin, Deutsches Künstlertheater
Frühlingsmädel (revised version of Frühling)	Singspiel	1 act	Rudolf Eger	29 May 1928	Berlin, Neues Theater am Zoo
Friederike	Singspiel	3 acts	Ludwig Herzer and Fritz Löhner-Beda	4 October 1928	Berlin, Metropol Theater
Das Land des Lächelns / The Land of Smiles (revised version of Die gelbe Jacke)	Romantic operetta	3 acts	Ludwig Herzer and Fritz Löhner-Beda, after Viktor Léon	10 October 1929	Berlin, Metropol Theater
Schön ist die Welt (revised version of Endlich allein)	Operetta	3 acts	Ludwig Herzer and Fritz Löhner-Beda	3 December 1930	Berlin, Metropol Theater
Der Fürst der Berge (revised version of Das Fürstenkind)	Operetta			23 September 1932	Berlin, Nollendorfplatz
Giuditta	musical comedy	5 scenes	Paul Knepler and Fritz Löhner-Beda	20 January 1934	Vienna State Opera
Garabonciás diák (The Wandering Scholar, revised version of Zigeunerliebe)	romantic Singspiel	3 acts	Vincze, Ernő Innocent	20 February 1943	Budapest, Royal Opera
