= Endlich allein =

Operetta by Franz Lehár

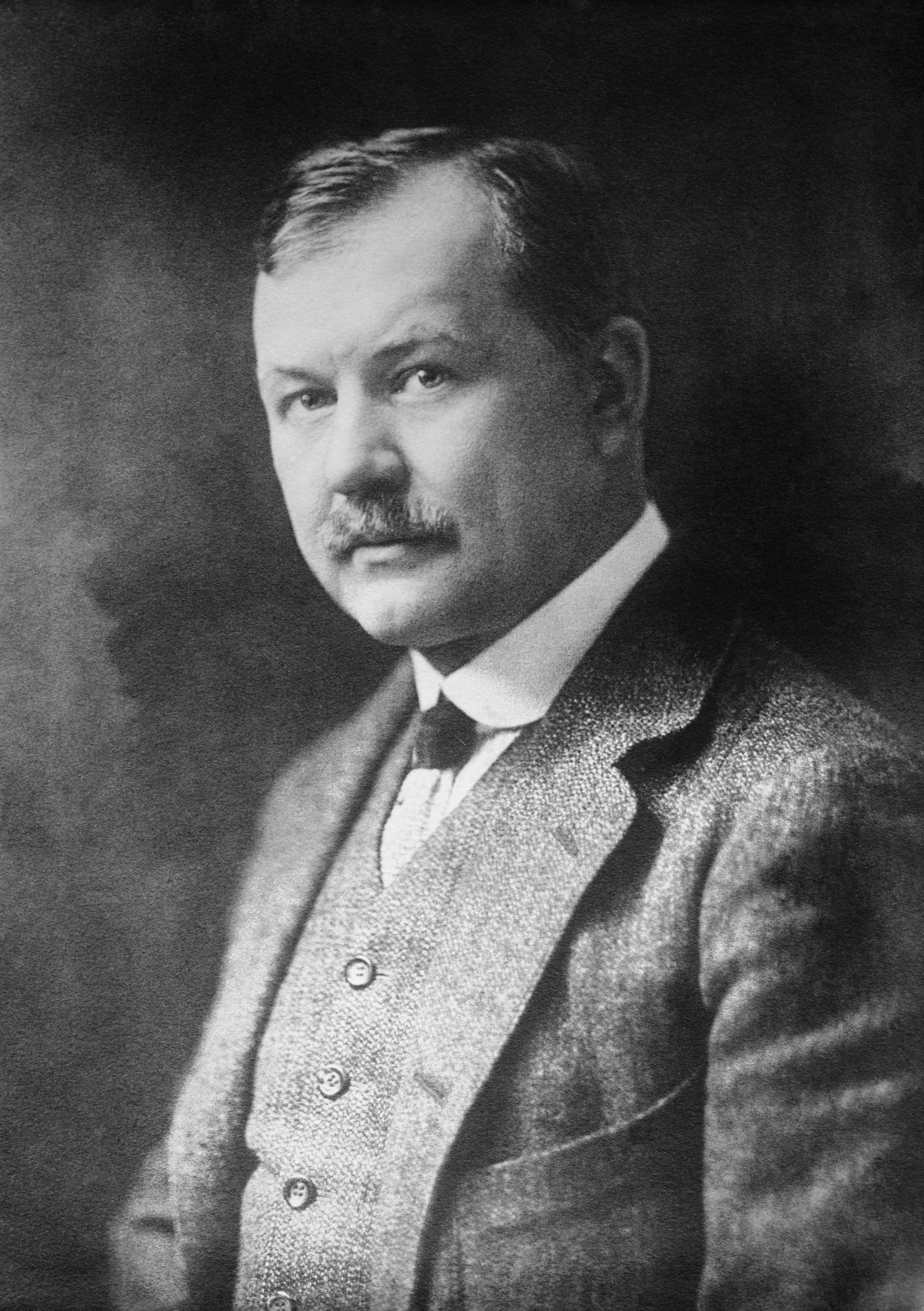
Franz Lehár, likely sometime between 1915 and 1920

Endlich allein (Alone at Last) is an operetta by composer Franz Lehár. It uses a German language libretto by A. M. Willner and Robert Bodanzky. It premiered on 30 January 1914 at the Theater an der Wien.

It was revised, with a text by Ludwig Herzer and Fritz Löhner-Beda, under the name Schön ist die Welt and given on 3 December 1930 at the Metropol in Berlin. The leading roles were taken by Gitta Alpar and Richard Tauber, who recorded several excerpts for the Odeon Records company.

== Roles ==
Role	Voice type	Premiere Cast, 30 January 1914 (Conductor:)
The King	baritone	Paul Guttmann
Elisabeth	soprano	Louise Kartousch
Duchess Maria Brankenhorst	mezzo-soprano	Mizzi Schulz
Crown Prince Georg	tenor	Hubert Marischka
Mercedes	soprano	Mizzi Günther
Count Sascha Karlowitsch	tenor	Ernst Tautenhayn

== Recordings ==
- Lehár: Schön ist die Welt, Munich Radio Orchestra
  - Conductor: Ulf Schirmer
  - Principal singers: Elena Mosuc, Isabella Stettner, Masako Goda, Andreas Hirtreiter, Roland Kandlbinder
  - Recording date: 2004
  - Label: CPO Records 777 055-2 (CD)
