= Where the Lark Sings =

Where the Lark Sings (German: Wo die Lerche singt) may refer to:

- Where the Lark Sings (operetta), a 1918 operetta by Franz Lehár
- Where the Lark Sings (film), a 1936 musical comedy film
- Where the Lark Sings (1956 film),
