= Der Göttergatte =

Operetta by Franz Lehár

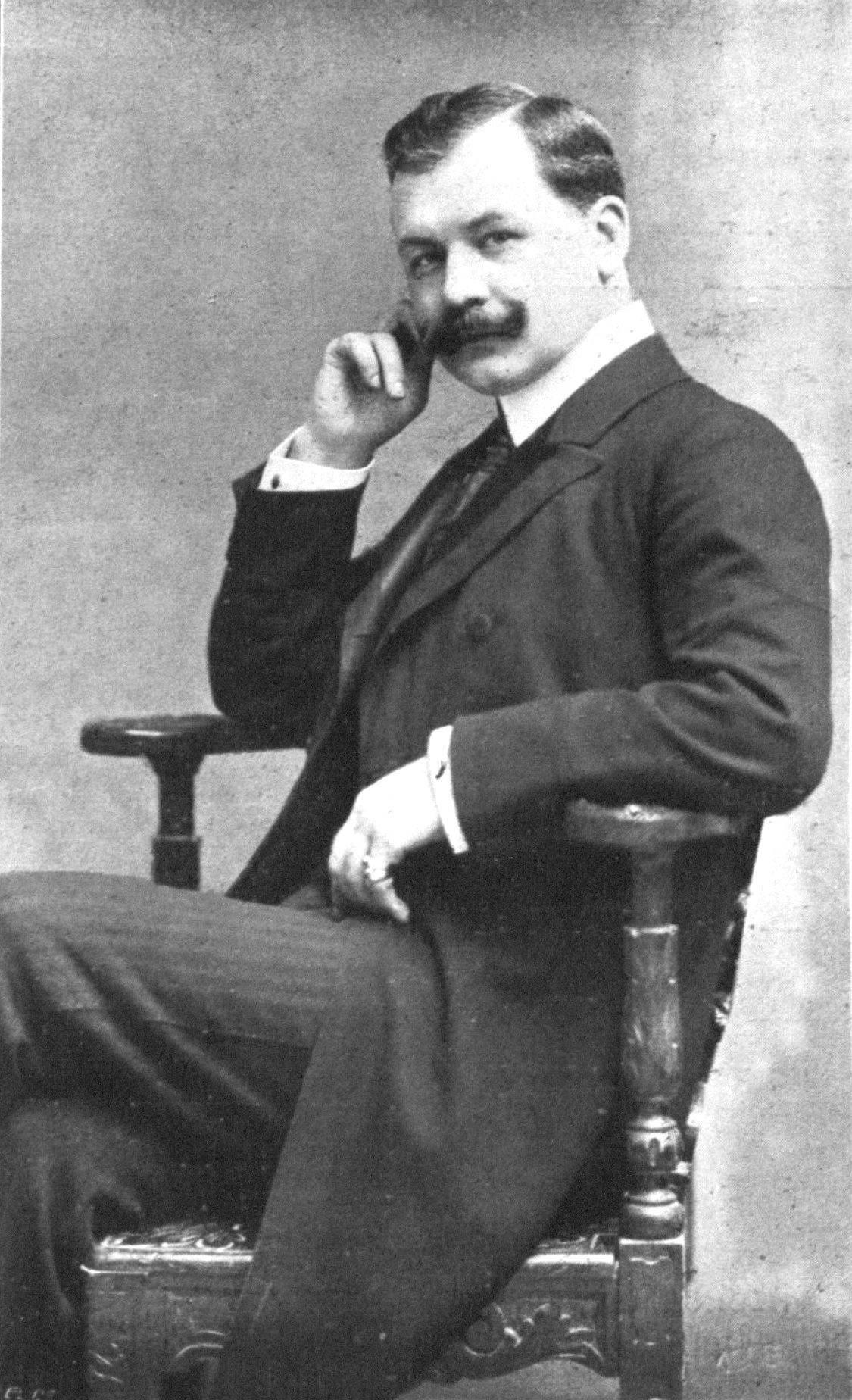
Franz Lehár in 1906

Der Göttergatte (The Divine Husband) is an operetta, originally with a prelude and two acts, by composer Franz Lehár. It used a German language libretto by Viktor Léon and Leo Stein, and premiered on 20 January 1904 at the Carltheater in Vienna.

The work was revised as Die ideale Gattin (The Ideal Wife), this time in three acts, with a text by Julius Brammer and Alfred Grünwald, after Die Zwillingsschwester by Ludwig Fulda and given on 11 October 1913 at the Theater an der Wien with sopranos Louise Kartousch and Mizzi Günther, and tenors Hubert Marischka and Ernst Tautenhayn.

The work was re-revised as Die Tangokönigin (The Tango Queen) for the Apollo Theater in Vienna on 9 September 1921.

== Roles ==
- Juno (soprano)
- Jupiter (tenor)
- Merkur (tenor)

== Recordings ==
- The overture to Der Göttergatte has been recorded by Michail Jurowski and the Berlin Radio Symphony Orchestra (CD CPO 999891).
- A recording was made in 1913 or 1914 of the original cast of Die ideale Gattin (Louise Kartousch, Ernst Tautenhayn, Mizzi Günther, Hubert Marischka) performing: Hamplemann-Duett (Kartousch, Tautenhayn); Rauch-Duett (Marischka, Tautenhayn); "Wenn meine Gattin so küssen könnt'!" (Günther, Marischka); "Nur mit dir allein" (Günther, Marischka); "Meine Gemahlin ist auf kurze Zeit verreist", Marsch (Günther, Kartousch, Marischka, Tautenhayn); "Küss mich" (Günther).
- March 15, 1945, Vienna; Conductor: Max Schönherr; Vienna Radio Orchestra and Chorus, Liesl Andergast, Henry Herze, Anton Dermota, Franz Borsos, Fred Liewehr, Lizzi Holzschuh; CPO 777 029-2
