= Escape to the Foreign Legion =

1929 film

- Directed by: Louis Ralph
- Written by: Louis Ralph; Curt Siodmak
- Produced by: Heinrich Nebenzahl; Gustav Schwab; Edgar G. Ulmer
- Starring: Hans Stüwe; Alexander Murski; Eva von Berne
- Cinematography: Akos Farkas; Axel Graatkjær
- Production company: Ideal-Film
- Release date: 30 July 1929
- Country: Germany
- Languages: Silent; German intertitles

Escape to the Foreign Legion (German: Flucht in die Fremdenlegion) is a 1929 German silent film directed and co-written by Louis Ralph and starring Hans Stüwe, Alexander Murski, and Eva von Berne. Location shooting took place in Ceuta (Spain) in the time of Spanish Morocco.

== Cast ==
- Hans Stüwe as Georg Leitron
- Alexander Murski as Bankier Leroi
- Eva von Berne as Yvonne, seine Tochter
- Harry Hardt as G. B. Hunter
- Eugen Burg as Dr. Hahn, Komissar
- Else Reval as Dirne
- Pedro Larrañaga as Offizier der Legion
- Alexander Granach as Beppo, Legionär
- Louis Ralph as Mosler
- Carl Walther Meyer as Igor Preobrankewitsch
- Louis Treumann as Niteff, Werbe-Agent
- Ilse Gery as Zofe
- Elfriede Borodin as Ines
- Henry Bender as Kapitän

== Bibliography ==
- Isenberg, Noah (2008). Detour. London: British Film Institute. ISBN 978-1-84457-239-7.
