= W. H. Berry =

English actor (1870–1951)

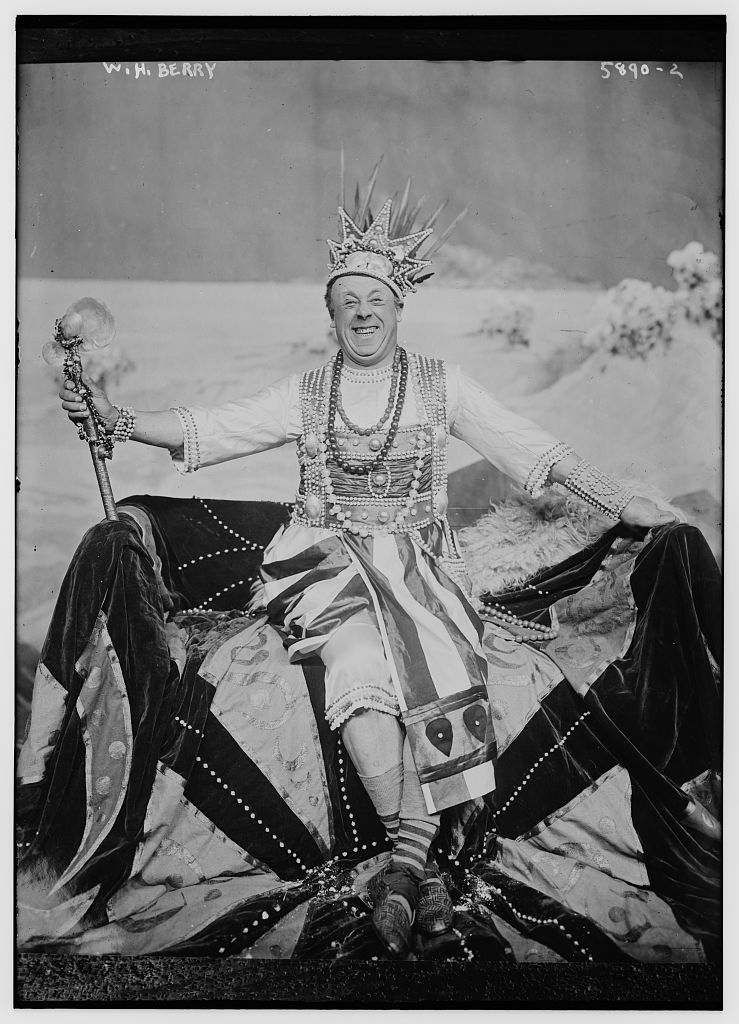
Berry

William Henry Berry (23 March 1870 – 2 May 1951), always billed as W. H. Berry, was an English comic actor. After developing his performance skills in pierrot and concert entertainments, he was spotted by the actor-manager George Grossmith Jr., and appeared in a series of musical comedies in comic character roles. His greatest success was as Mr. Meebles, the hapless magistrate in The Boy in 1917.

Berry was a pioneer broadcaster, making radio appearances within months of the launch of the BBC. He continued broadcasting into the late 1930s. He also appeared in variety.

== Biography ==
Berry in 1916

Berry was born in London. At the age of 14 he was apprenticed to the theatrical booking agency Keith, Prowse and Co., which gave him access to free seats for West End plays and musical shows. He developed a strong interest in the theatre, and got a job as assistant business manager to the actor-manager Wilson Barrett at the old Globe Theatre. In 1898, Barrett gave up the Globe, and left England to tour Australia, leaving Berry unemployed. He took a job in a factory where his colleagues found him entertaining, leading to his frequent appearances at local dinners and concerts. While still at the factory, he met Kitty Hanson, a typist, whom he married.

Berry developed his professional skills performing as a concert artist in the winter and a pierrot with seaside concert parties in the summer. His wife left her work as a typist and joined him in theatrical performances. At one of his concert engagements George Grossmith Jr. and Ivan Caryll saw him and were impressed enough to invite Berry and his wife to join the cast of a forthcoming musical comedy to be presented by George Edwardes. Berry appeared with Lily Elsie in The Merry Widow, in 1907; his burlesque dance with Gabrielle Ray was one of the hits of the show.

After this, Berry was seen in a string of shows including Havana (1908), A Waltz Dream (1908), The Dollar Princess (1909), The Count of Luxembourg (1911), Gipsy Love (1912), High Jinks (1916), and his greatest success, The Boy (1917), in which he played Mr. Meebles, the respectable magistrate who finds himself at the centre of farcical uproar. In 1920, he starred in The Naughty Princess and as Dipper Twigg in The Golden Moth at the Adelphi Theatre, London. He played Christian Velt in Lilac Time in several revivals in the 1920s and 1930s. He appeared in Princess Charming in 1926.

As one of the earliest broadcasters, Berry first appeared on radio in 1922 in the BBC's first months. Among his radio achievements, The Times singled out his later broadcast as Mr. Micawber in 1938. He also appeared in variety.

Kitty Berry died in 1947. At the age of 77, Berry married Agnes Lyndon, who had nursed him through a serious illness. Berry died at his home in Herne Bay on the coast of Kent, at the age of 81.
