= Die Dollarprinzessin =

1907 operetta by Leo Fall

- Operetta by Leo Fall
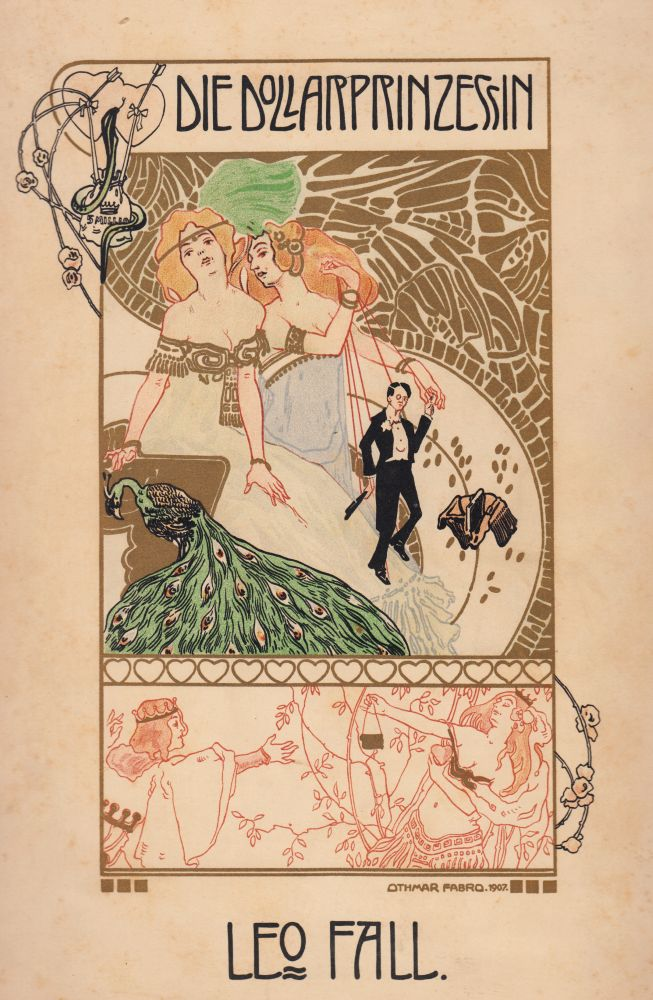
- Cover of the vocal score
- Librettist: Alfred Maria Willner; Fritz Grünbaum
- Premiere: 2 November 1907; Theater an der Wien, Vienna

Die Dollarprinzessin is an operetta by Leo Fall. The German libretto was by Alfred Maria Willner and Fritz Grünbaum after the comedy Die Dollarprinzessinen by Emerich von Gatti and Thilo Friedrich Wilhelm von Trotha.

== Performance history ==
It was first performed at the Theater an der Wien in Vienna on 2 November 1907, conducted by the composer and starring Mizzi Günther as Alice. An English adaptation, called The Dollar Princess opened in London at Daly's Theatre on 25 September 1909 and ran for 428 performances.

== Extant score ==
Click for a scanned version of the 79-page score from Leeds University Library

A piano score with German lyrics (but no vocal parts) is kept in Special Collections at the University of Leeds. It was digitised as part of a research project in 2018.

== Roles ==
Roles, voice types, premiere cast
Role	Voice type	Premiere cast, 2 November 1907 Conductor: Leo Fall
Alice	soprano	Mizzi Günther
Fredy Wehrburg	tenor	Louis Treumann
Hans Freiherr von Schlick	bass	Karl Meister
Daisy	soprano	Louise Kartousch
John Couder		
Dick		
Tom		
Frinton		
Mizzi		
Olga Labinska		
Von Richthofen		
