= Where the Lark Sings (film) =

- Directed by: Carl Lamac
- Written by: Géza von Cziffra; Heinz Reichert (libretto); Alfred Maria Willner (libretto)
- Starring: Mártha Eggerth; Alfred Neugebauer; Hans Söhnker; Lucie Englisch
- Cinematography: Werner Brandes; István Eiben; Hans Imbert
- Edited by: Viktor Bánky
- Music by: Franz Lehár (operetta)
- Production company: Film A.G Berna
- Distributed by: Lux Film (Austria); Tobis (worldwide)
- Release date: 30 October 1936
- Running time: 97 minutes
- Countries: Germany; Hungary; Switzerland
- Language: German

Where the Lark Sings (German: Wo die Lerche singt) is a 1936 musical comedy film directed by Carl Lamac and starring Mártha Eggerth, Alfred Neugebauer and Hans Söhnker. It is an Operetta film, based on the 1918 work Where the Lark Sings by Franz Lehár. The film was a German language co-production of Hungary, Germany and Switzerland.

== Cast ==
- Mártha Eggerth as Baronesse Margit von Bardy
- Alfred Neugebauer as Baron von Bardy - ihr Vater
- Hans Söhnker as Hans Berend
- Lucie Englisch as Anna - Margrits Zofe
- Fritz Imhoff as Török - Faktotum bei Bardy
- Rudolf Carl as Pista - Knecht bei Bardy
- Oskar Pouché as Zakos, Mühlenbesitzer
- Robert Valberg as Lawyer Dr. Kolbe
- Gisa Wurm as Emma Kolbe - seine Frau
- Tibor Halmay as Willi Kolbe - deren Sohn
- Maria Matzner as Piri, Magd
- Rita Tanagra as Else - Margits Freundin
- Leo Resnicek as Autobus-Chauffeur
- Karl Hauser as Gyuri - Kellner
- Joe Furtner as Dr. Dudas
- Anna Kallina as Mutter von Hans Berend

== Bibliography ==
- Bergfelder, Tim & Bock, Hans-Michael. The Concise Cinegraph: Encyclopedia of German. Berghahn Books, 2009.
