= Play Around a Man =

1929 film

- Directed by: Robert Land
- Written by: Fanny Carlsen
- Produced by: Gustav Schwab
- Starring: Liane Haid; Anna Kallina; Fred Louis Lerch
- Cinematography: Eduard Hoesch; Edgar S. Ziesemer
- Production company: Merkur Film
- Distributed by: Deutsche First National Pictures
- Release date: 1 October 1929
- Country: Germany
- Languages: Silent; German intertitles

Play Around a Man (German: Spiel um den Mann) is a 1929 German silent film directed by Robert Land and starring Liane Haid, Anna Kallina, and Fred Louis Lerch. It was shot at the National Studios in Berlin. The film's sets were designed by the art director Edgar G. Ulmer.

== Cast ==
- Liane Haid as Mizzi
- Anna Kallina as Fürstin Prachs-Lehndorff
- Fred Louis Lerch as Dr. Paul Reidl
- Anton Pointner as Hochstapler
- Albert Heine as Johann Reidl, Pauls Vater
- Fred Hennings as Graf Landskron
- Eugen Burg as Polizeikommissar
- Louis Treumann as Verliebter Herr
- Erich Dunskus as Verbrecher
- Evelyn Arden

== Bibliography ==
- Isenberg, Noah (2008). Detour. London: British Film Institute. ISBN 978-1-84457-239-7.
