= Eva von Berne =

Austrian actress (1910–2010)

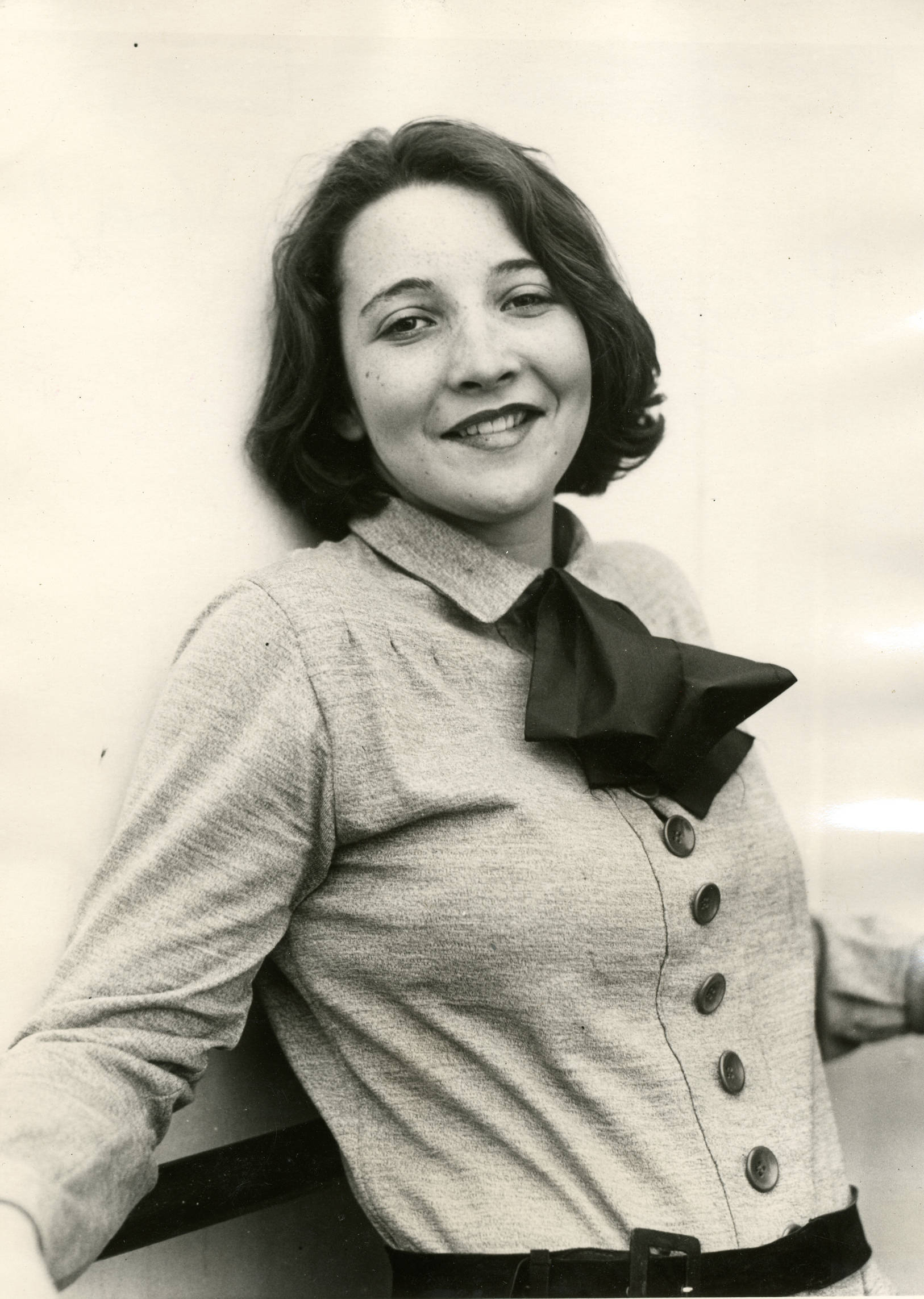
- Eva von Berne in 1933
- Born: Genofeva Plentzner von Scharneck; 8 July 1910; Sarajevo, Austria-Hungary
- Died: 9 November 2010 (aged 100); Hédervár, Hungary
- Other name: Eva von Plentzner
- Occupation: Actress
- Years active: 1928–1930
- Spouse: Helmut Krauss

Eva von Berne (born Genofeva Plentzner von Scharneck, 8 July 1910 – 9 November 2010) was an Austrian film actress.

== Biography ==
Eva von Berne was born Genofeva Plentzner von Scharneck in Sarajevo which was then part of the Austro-Hungarian Empire. Her parents were Karl Emil Angelo Plentzner von Scharneck (born 1878), originally from Komárom, and Franziska von Plentzner von Scharneck (née Silber, born 1886), who was born in Salzburg. She had three siblings. After the outbreak of World War I the Pentzner von Scharneck family fled to Vienna.

She was working as a dance instructor and model when she was discovered in Vienna by the Hollywood producer Irving Thalberg who was there on his honeymoon with Norma Shearer.

Convinced she had star potential, Thalberg signed her up for MGM. Considered as a "new Garbo" she was heavily promoted by the studio's publicity department. However, after making her debut in the 1928 silent The Masks of the Devil concerns grew at the studio about her weight and her inability to speak English which was a requirement due to the arrival of sound films. She returned to Europe without making another film in America. In Germany she appeared in four productions and then announced her retirement from films in 1930 at the age of twenty.

In 1930, a PR consultant of MGM made a mistake when he released the information that Eva von Berne died in 1930 at the age of only 20 years because of excessive diet. This was still accepted as fact in the 1980s, and it wasn't until the 2000s that the public became aware that she was still alive. In a 2006 interview with Toni Schieck, von Berne said, "...It was fortunate that the world thought that I died. So I did not have to deal with autograph hunters".

Eva von Berne worked as an executive to display windows in Vienna, and later she fled to Salzburg after the beginning of World War II where she lived with her family.

Von Berne was also successful as a sculptor and had several exhibitions in Austria.

She married Helmut Krauss, a former major in the Austrian army. Von Berne died on November 9, 2010, at the age of 100.

== Filmography ==
- The Masks of the Devil (1928) *Lost film
- Somnambul (1929)
- Trust of Thieves (1929)
- Escape to the Foreign Legion (1929)
- The Call of the North (1929)
- Hollywood (1980)

== Bibliography ==
- Bengt Forslund. Victor Sjöström: his life and his work. New York Zoetrope, 1988.
