= The Dollar Princess =

Musical by Leo Fall, Basil Hood and Adrian Ross

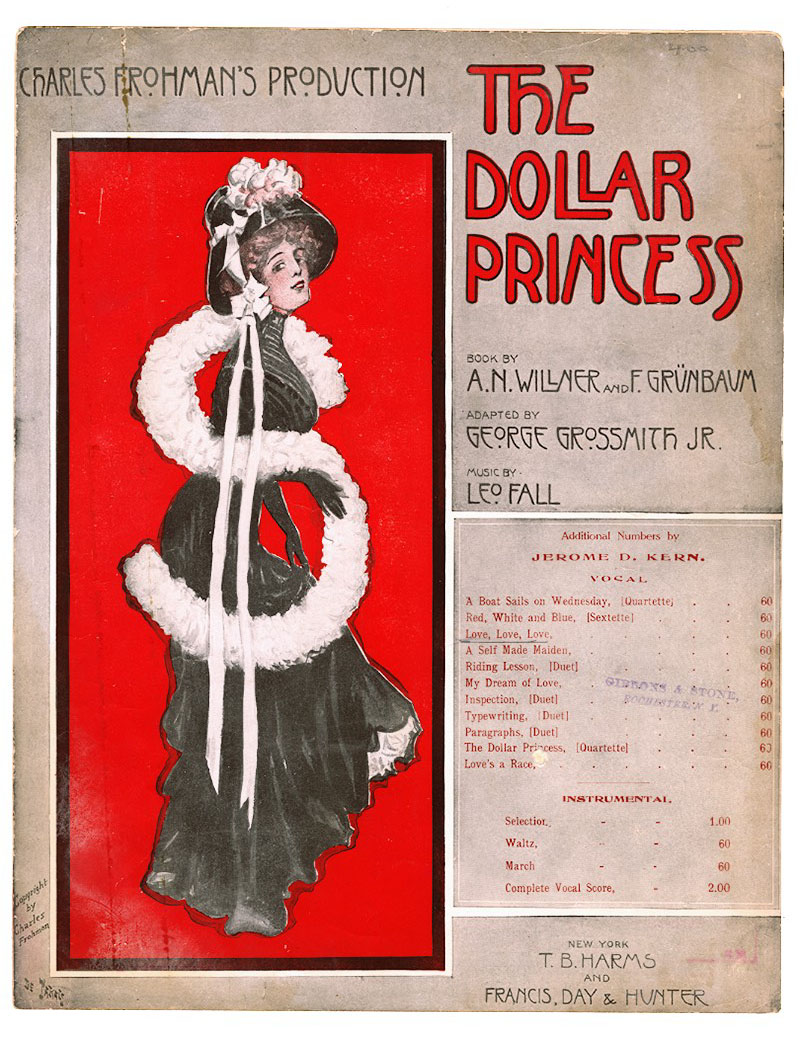
- Sheet music cover
- Music: Leo Fall; Jerome Kern
- Lyrics: Adrian Ross; George Grossmith, Jr.
- Book: A. M. Willner; Fritz Grünbaum; Basil Hood; George Grossmith, Jr.
- Basis: German operetta Die Dollarprinzessin
- Premiere: 25 September 1909: Daly's Theatre, London
- Productions: 1909 West End; 1909 Broadway

Lily Elsie as Alice

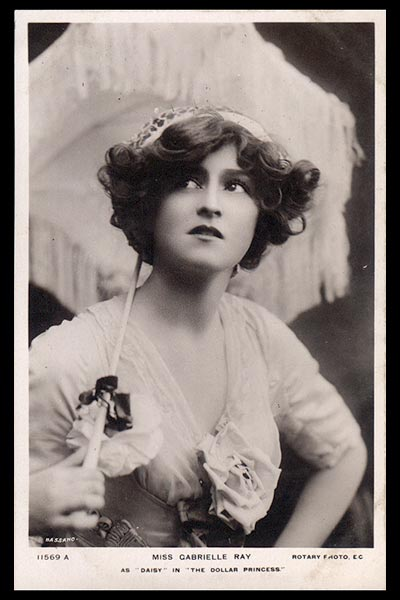
Gabrielle Ray as Daisy

The Dollar Princess is a musical in three acts, with music by Leo Fall, adapted into English by Basil Hood with lyrics by Adrian Ross (from the 1907 Die Dollarprinzessin with a German-language libretto by A. M. Willner and Fritz Grünbaum, after a comedy by Emerich von Gatti and Thilo Friedrich Wilhelm von Trotha). It opened in London at Daly's Theatre on 25 September 1909, running for 428 performances. The London production starred Lily Elsie, Joseph Coyne, W. H. Berry and Gabrielle Ray. The young Gladys Cooper played a small role.

It also had a very successful run on Broadway, with a new book and lyrics by George Grossmith, Jr. and additional numbers by Jerome Kern, opening on 6 August 1909 and running for 288 performances. Valli Valli, Adrienne Augarde and Louie Pounds starred in the New York production.

In late Victorian and Edwardian Britain, "dollar princess" was the nickname given to American heiresses. Playgoer and Society Illustrated wrote, "To the average playgoer there is something very attractive in watching the antics of the vulgar when surrounded by the refinement of art which he can neither understand nor appreciate.... Miss Lily Elsie, as Alice, shows even an improvement on her performance in The Merry Widow. The inimitable Mr. Joseph Coyne has put a lot more into his part than was possible on the first night.... He is great! His American accent is a thing to listen to...."

== Roles and London cast list ==
- Freddy Fairfax – Robert Michaelis
- Harry Q. Conder (a multi-millionaire) – Joseph Coyne
- Mr. Bulger (Conder's confidential clerk) – W. H. Berry
- Dick (cousin to Conder) – Evelyn Beerbohm
- John, Earl of Quorn (Conder's groom) – Basil S. Foster
- Sir James Mcgregor (Conder's footman) – Willie Warde
- Duke of Stonehenge (Conder's butler) – F. J. Blackman
- Vicomte de Brésac (Conder's chef) – Garnet Wilson
- Lieut. Grant (U.S.A.) – Harold Deacon
- Olga (a lion queen) – Emmy Wehlen
- Daisy (Dick's sister) – Gabrielle Ray
- Dulcie Du Cros (a Californian girl) – May Kinder
- Sadie Von Tromp (her friend) – Gladys Cooper
- Lady Augusta – Phyllis Le Grand
- Lady Dorothy – May Hobson
- Lady Gwendoline – Gertrude Glyn
- Lady Margaret – Marion Lindsay
- Hon. Editha Dalrymple – Dolly Dombey
- Alice (Conder's sister) – Lily Elsie

== Synopsis ==
English version

A young American oil tycoon, when recruiting domestic staff, takes on a succession of impoverished members of the European aristocracy. But the servants he selects are all very well connected. "Tho' we came here in the steerage, all are members of the peerage." His sister, who has money, later follows the course of true love and takes a job in another household pretending to be impoverished.

American version

Three plot lines take place concurrently: First, an American girl, the daughter of the President of the Coal Trust (the dollar princess), falls in love with a young Englishman and tries to win his heart. Meanwhile, the millionaire father has an affair with a supposed Countess, who turns out to be a lion tamer. Also, his niece, Daisy, marries a young Marquis, but she refuses to be anything but his friend.

== Musical numbers ==
Act I - Conder's House in New York.

- No. 1 - Chorus - "We're the household of the great Mister Harry Conder, drawn from ev'ry ancient state over the ocean yonder!"
- No. 1a - Alice - "A self-made Yankee maiden, she isn't greatly drawn to castles mortgage-laden, and coronets in pawn!"
- No. 2 - Daisy and Quorn - "I'm very sorry if you've thought I do not serve you as I might! ... Oh, no! Not that, but still you might be more attentive"
- No. 3 - Freddy - "A little maiden by the way, so simple, sweet and fair, is not the love for whom I pray, you meet her ev'ry where!"
- No. 4 - Alice and Freddy - "The people round that I am paying must be good-looking, that's my whim! It's what papa is always saying"
- No. 5 - Olga, Conder, Dick and Bulger - "Myself the Countess I'll introduce: Olga Alaska Tabasco Kachewska! ... Can you repeat it, please?"
- No. 6 - Finale Act I - "And now assemble all my household here! Let ev'rybody instantly appear! Before in feast we give our joy expansion, I'll introduce"

Act II - Garden Court, Conder's House.

- No. 7 - Chorus - "In afternoon of sunny June across the lawn the net is drawn. You take your racquet and your ball, and men and maidens say: Love all!"
- No. 8 - Conder and Girls - "Mister, Mister Conder, whither will you wander? You are like a child again! Why are you so very juvenile and merry?"
- No. 9 - Alice and Freddy - "A secretary such as you is nothing to his betters; and he can write, is that not true? Their most intimate letters!"
- No. 10 - Daisy and Sir James - "I may be going rather soon on an extensive honeymoon, so I suppose I must buy clothes ... Ladies at times wear those"
- No. 11 - Bulger - "Some women may have loved me for my face - I do not know. And some for that 'Je ne sais quoi' I call my 'Touch and go'"
- No. 12 - Alice and Conder - "Many a time, my brother, we have laughed and cried. We both were very naughty, then we used to run and hide!"
- No. 13 - Olga and Conder - "Ah! Ah! I'm Queen of men, Parisienne, la fine fleur de Paris. Ah! Ah! Tout de même, je vous aime! Do you care for me?"
- No. 14 - Alice, Daisy, Quorn and Freddy - "Who are the girls that glitter and glance, full in the sun of joy? Life is to them like a marvellous dance"
- No. 15 - Finale Act II - "We're delighted here invited to attend these gorgeous fêtes! Quite surprising, and out classing those of European states"

Act III - Freddy's Bungalow in California.

- No. 15a - Entr'Acte
- No. 16 - Opening of Act III
- No. 17 - Daisy and Bulger - "We are a couple of happy tramps, low on scamps, happy tramps; everywhere we will pitch our camps"
- No. 18 - Daisy and Quorn - "Please my lord and master, you'll be true to me? ... Yes, my little darling, I will be. Shall we find when married"
- No. 19 - "Hip, hip, hurrah! ... So ring the merry wedding bells to hail this day! ... Hip, hip, hurrah! ... For we're the most tremendous swells in U. S. A!"
- No. 20 - Alice and Freddy - "Then you go? ... And you stay! ... What must I do? ... You act for me when I'm away, just as I used to do for you!"

== See also ==
Die Dollarprinzessin, the original work.
