= Trust of Thieves =

1929 film

- German: Trust der Diebe
- Directed by: Erich Schönfelder
- Written by: Ernst Klein (novel); Richard Royce
- Produced by: Georg C. Horetsky; Seymour Nebenzal
- Starring: Agnes Esterhazy; Paul Otto; Eva von Berne
- Cinematography: Willy Goldberger
- Production company: Nero Film
- Release date: 8 November 1929
- Country: Germany
- Languages: Silent; German intertitles

Trust of Thieves (German: Trust der Diebe) is a 1929 German silent film directed by Erich Schönfelder and starring Agnes Esterhazy, Paul Otto and Eva von Berne.

The film's art direction was by Karl Görge.

== Cast ==
- Agnes Esterhazy as Lady Rellonay
- Paul Otto as Juwelier Voilson
- Eva von Berne as Miss Smith, Kriminalassistentin
- Oscar Marion as Charlie
- Kurt Vespermann as burglar
- Paul Graetz as burglar
- Krafft-Raschig as burglar
- Carl Goetz as Greimann, the banker
- Otto Wallburg as detective commissioner Warren
- Philipp Manning as coroner
- Louis Treumann as Member of the Supervisory Board
- Ernst Pittschau as Member of the Supervisory Board
- Arthur Duarte as Member of the Supervisory Board
