= The Merry Widow =

Operetta by Franz Lehár

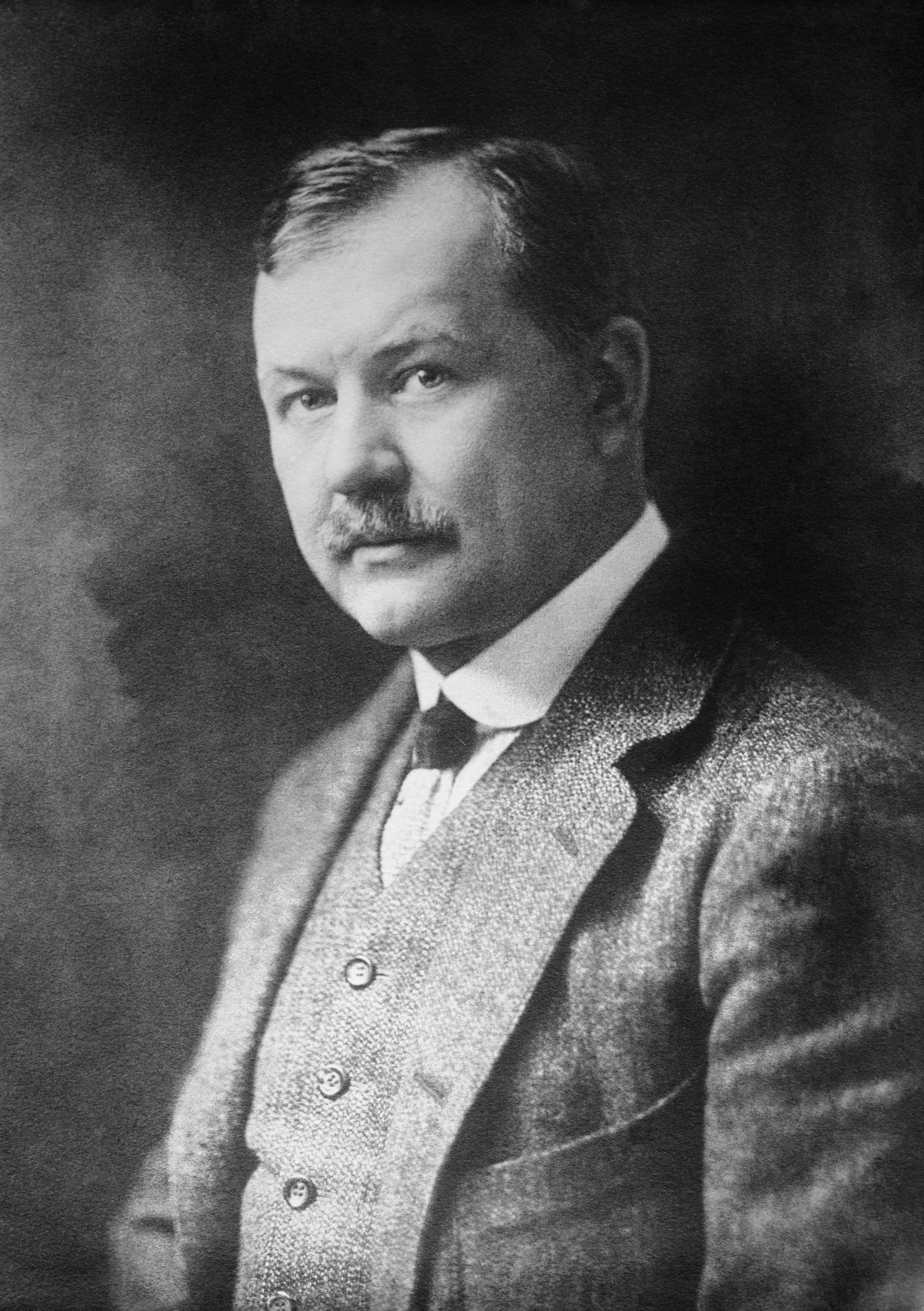
Franz Lehár

The Merry Widow (German: Die lustige Witwe [diː ˈlʊstɪɡə ˈvɪtvə]) is an operetta by the Austro-Hungarian composer Franz Lehár. The librettists, Viktor Léon and Leo Stein, based the story – concerning a rich widow, and her countrymen's attempt to keep her money in the principality by finding her the right husband – on an 1861 comedy play, L'attaché d'ambassade (The Embassy Attaché) by Henri Meilhac.

The operetta has enjoyed extraordinary international success since its 1905 premiere in Vienna and continues to be frequently revived and recorded. Film and other adaptations have also been made. Famous standards from the score include the "Vilja Song", "Da geh' ich zu Maxim" ("You'll Find Me at Maxim's"), and the "Merry Widow Waltz" (lyricized as "Lippen schweigen", or "Lips are silent").

== Background ==
Lily Elsie in act 3, London, 1907

In 1861, Henri Meilhac premiered a comic play in Paris, L'attaché d'ambassade (The Embassy Attaché), in which the Parisian ambassador of a poor German grand duchy, Baron Scharpf, schemes to arrange a marriage between his country's richest widow (a French woman) and a Count to keep her money at home, thus preventing economic disaster in the duchy. The play was soon adapted into German as Der Gesandschafts-Attaché (1862) and was given several successful productions.

In early 1905, Viennese librettist Leo Stein came across the play and thought it would make a good operetta. He suggested this to one of his writing collaborators, Viktor Léon, and to the manager of the Theater an der Wien, who was eager to produce the operetta. The two adapted the libretto and updated the setting to contemporary Paris, expanding the plot to reference an earlier relationship between the widow (this time a countrywoman) and the Count. They moved the native land from a dour German province to a colourful little Balkan state, had the widow admit to an affair to protect the Baron's wife, and changed the Count's haven to the Parisian restaurant and nightclub Maxim's.

They asked Richard Heuberger to compose the music, as he had produced a previous Parisian-themed work at the Theater an der Wien, Der Opernball (1898). He composed a draft of the score, but it was unsatisfactory, and he gladly left the project. The theatre's staff next suggested that Franz Lehár might compose the piece. Lehár had worked with Léon and Stein on Der Göttergatte the previous year and began work on The Merry Widow immediately in 1905. He worked over the summer at Bad Ischl, including at the Rosenstöckl (Rose Cottage), where Meyerbeer composed the opera Le prophète.

Léon doubted Lehár could create an authentic Parisian atmosphere but was enchanted by the bubbly galop melody for "Dummer, dummer Reitersmann", the operetta's first number, which Lehár played for him by telephone. That July, after Lehár played the completed musical numbers, Léon requested some changes to the text and music, finding the waltzes derivative. Lehár later claimed that he had changed little, but Léon's letter likely influenced him: in August, he sketched the act 1 finale waltz ("Ballsirenen", or "Sirens of the ball") and the more famous slow waltz, sometimes called "the Merry Widow waltz", which at first had no text but was later adapted as the celebrated waltz–duet "Lippen schweigen", or "Lips are silent".

== Roles and premiere cast ==
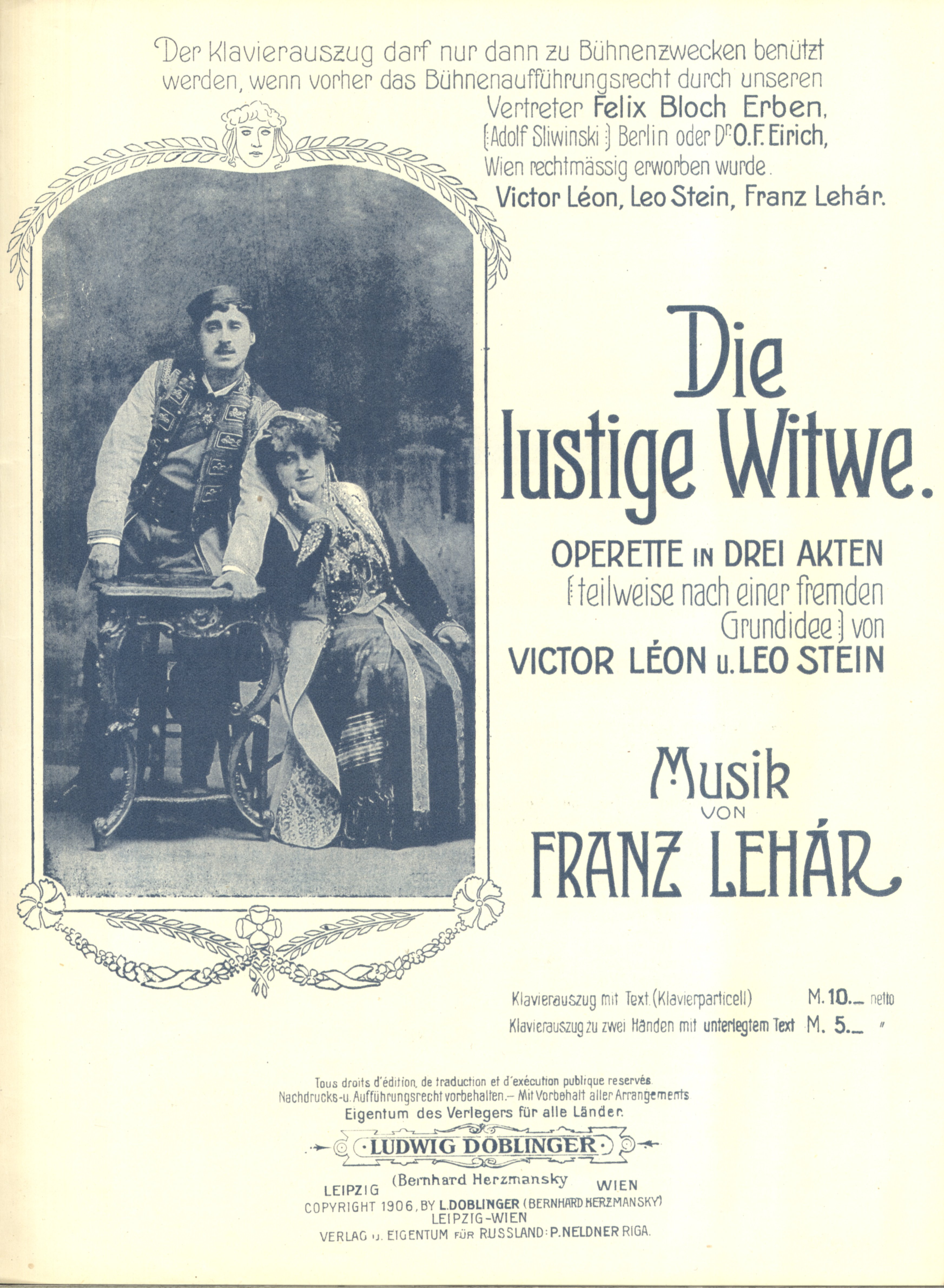
Louis Treumann and Mizzi Günther on the frontpage of a piano–vocal score, 1906

Roles, voice types, premiere cast
Role	Voice type	Premiere cast, 30 December 1905 Conductor: Franz Lehár
Hanna Glawari, a wealthy widow (title role)	soprano	Mizzi Günther
Count Danilo Danilovitsch, First Secretary of the Pontevedrin embassy and Hanna's former lover	tenor or lyric baritone	Louis Treumann
Baron Mirko Zeta, the Ambassador	baritone	Siegmund Natzler
Valencienne, Baron Zeta's wife	soprano	Annie Wünsch
Camille, Count de Rosillon, French attaché to the embassy, the Baroness's admirer	tenor	Karl Meister
Njegus, the Embassy Secretary	spoken	Oskar Sachs
Kromow, Pontevedrin embassy counsellor	baritone	Heinrich Pirl
Bogdanovitch, Pontevedrin consul	baritone	Fritz Albin
Sylviane, Bogdanovitch's wife	soprano	Bertha Ziegler
Raoul de St Brioche, French diplomat	tenor	Carlo Böhm
Vicomte Cascada, Latin diplomat	baritone	Leo von Keller
Olga, Kromow's wife	mezzo-soprano	Minna Schütz
Pritschitsch, Embassy consul	baritone	Julius Bramer
Praskowia, Pritschitsch's wife	mezzo-soprano	Lili Wista
Parisians and Pontevedrins, musicians and servants

== Synopsis ==
The operetta originally had no overture. Lehár wrote one for the 400th performance, and though the Vienna Philharmonic performed it at his 70th birthday concert in April 1940, it is rarely used in productions of the operetta, as the original short introduction is preferred by most musical directors. Lehár made changes for a Berlin production in the 1920s, but the definitive version of the score is generally that of the original production.

=== Act 1 ===
The embassy in Paris of the poverty-stricken Balkan principality of Pontevedro is holding a ball to celebrate the birthday of the sovereign, the Grand Duke. Hanna Glawari, who has inherited twenty million francs from her late husband, is to be a guest at the ball – and the Pontevedrin ambassador, Baron Zeta, is scheming to ensure that she will keep her fortune in the country, saving Pontevedro from bankruptcy. The Baron intends that Count Danilo Danilovitsch, the first secretary of the embassy, should marry the widow; unfortunately for this plan, Danilo is not at the party, so Zeta sends Danilo's assistant Njegus to fetch him from Maxim's.

Danilo arrives and meets Hanna. It emerges they were in love before her marriage, but his uncle had interrupted their romance because Hanna had had nothing to her name. Though they still love each other, Danilo now refuses to court Hanna for her fortune, and Hanna vows that she will not marry him until he says "I love you" – something he claims he will never do.

Meanwhile, Baron Zeta's wife Valencienne has been flirting with the French attaché to the embassy, Count Camille de Rosillon, who writes "I love you" on her fan. Valencienne puts off Camille's advances, saying that she is a respectable wife. However, they lose the incriminating fan, which is found by embassy counsellor Kromow. Kromow jealously fears that the fan belongs to his own wife, Olga, and gives it to Baron Zeta. Not recognising it, Baron Zeta decides to return the fan discreetly, in spite of Valencienne's desperate offers to take it "to Olga" herself.

On his way to find Olga, the Baron meets Danilo, and his diplomatic mission takes precedence over the fan. The Baron orders Danilo to marry Hanna. Danilo refuses, but offers to eliminate any non-Pontevedrin suitors as a compromise.

As the "Ladies' Choice" dance is about to begin, Hanna becomes swarmed with hopeful suitors. Valencienne volunteers Camille to dance with Hanna, privately hoping that the Frenchman will marry her and cease to be a temptation for Valencienne herself. True to his bargain with the Baron, Danilo circulates the ballroom, rounding up ladies to claim dances and thin the crowd around the wealthy widow. Hanna, however, chooses the one man who is not apparently interested in dancing with her: Danilo, who immediately announces that he will sell his dance with Hanna Glawari for ten thousand francs, with the proceeds to benefit charity. This extinguishes the remaining suitors' interest in the dance. After they have left, Danilo attempts to dance with Hanna, who refuses in annoyance. Nonchalantly he proceeds to waltz by himself, eventually wearing down Hanna's resistance, and she falls into his arms.

=== Act 2 ===
The next evening, everyone is dressed in Pontevedrin clothing for a garden party at Hanna's house, now celebrating the Grand Duke's birthday in his own country's fashion. Hanna entertains by singing an old Pontevedrin song: "Es lebt' eine Vilja, ein Waldmägdelein" ("There lived a Vilja, a maid of the woods"). Meanwhile, Baron Zeta fears that Camille will spoil his plan for Hanna to marry a Pontevedrin. Still not recognising the fan as Valencienne's, the Baron orders Danilo to discover the identity of its owner, whom he correctly assumes to be Camille's married lover. The two men, along with Njegus, arrange to meet that evening in Hanna's garden pavilion to discuss Danilo's findings, as well as the problem of securing the widow's fortune for Pontevedro. Seeing the fan, Hanna takes the message on it to be Danilo's declaration of love for her, which he denies. His inquiries regarding the fan prove fruitless, but do reveal infidelities committed by some of the wives of embassy personnel.

That evening, Camille and Valencienne meet in the garden, where Valencienne insists that they must part. Discovering the fan, accidentally left behind by Danilo, Camille begs Valencienne to let him have it as a keepsake. Valencienne agrees, writing "I'm a respectable wife" on it as a rejoinder to Camille's "I love you." Camille persuades Valencienne to join him in the pavilion so that they can say their goodbyes in private. This is of course the same pavilion where Danilo, the Baron, and Njegus have agreed to meet, and the latter, arriving first, locks the door when he spots people inside. Baron Zeta and Danilo follow, but Njegus quickly arranges with Hanna to change places with Valencienne. Camille emerges from the pavilion with Hanna, who announces that they plan to marry, leaving the Baron distraught at the thought of Pontevedro losing Hanna's millions and Valencienne distraught at losing Camille. Danilo is furious, and tells the story of a Princess who cheated on her Prince ("Es waren zwei Königskinder)" before storming off to seek distraction at Maxim's. Hanna realises that Danilo's anger over her engagement to another man proves that he loves her, and she rejoices amid the general despair.

=== Act 3 ===
Act 3 is set at a theme party in Hanna's ballroom, which she has decorated to look like Maxim's, complete with Maxim's grisettes (can-can dancers). Valencienne, who has dressed herself as a grisette, entertains the guests ("Ja, wir sind es, die Grisetten"). When Danilo arrives, having found the real Maxim's empty, he tells Hanna to give up Camille for the sake of Pontevedro. Much to Danilo's delight, Hanna replies truthfully that she was never engaged to Camille but was protecting the reputation of a married woman. Danilo comes very close to declaring his love for Hanna, but stops himself from doing so when he remembers her money and his proud refusal to court her for it. Njegus produces the fan, which he picked up earlier, and Baron Zeta finally remembers that it belongs to Valencienne. He swears to divorce his wife and marry the widow himself, but Hanna stops him by declaring that she will lose her fortune if she remarries. At this, Danilo promptly confesses his love for her and asks Hanna to marry him. Hanna triumphantly accepts, adding that she will lose her fortune only because it will become the property of her new husband. Valencienne assures Baron Zeta of her fidelity by pointing out her reply to Camille's declaration of love written on the fan: "Ich bin eine anständige Frau" ("I'm a respectable wife"). All ends happily.

== Reception ==
The Merry Widow became one of Europe's most performed operettas internationally, alongside Offenbach's Orpheus in the Underworld and Strauss's Die Fledermaus. It was performed maybe half a million times in its first sixty years, generating substantial sales through sheet music and recordings. Its extraordinary popularity, perhaps unmatched by any other play or musical until the 1960s, spawned fashions, merchandise, and product tie-ins, from corsets to chocolates. Lehár became one of the most frequently performed composers of his era.

He defended operetta as a serious art form, and The Merry Widow reflected his aim to expand the tradition while retaining popular appeal. Philosopher–critic Theodor W. Adorno remembered the Maxim song ("Da geh' ich zu Maxim") as a relic of the "love-world of frou-frou", while Young Vienna writer and journalist Karl Kraus praised and satirized Léhar and Léon. Modern productions have varied in interpretation and casting, and English-language scholarship has been relatively limited.

The Merry Widow faced some early skepticism and controversy. Before its premiere, theater director Wilhelm Karczag dismissed it as "not music", and stage manager Karl Wallner called it "vaudeville". Later, Wallner claimed he had supported it from the start. It also engaged contemporary issues, including suffrage, the Triple Alliance, and the European balance of power, in fin-de-siècle politics. Its Balkan backstory provided cover but prompted censorship and legal disputes.

== Premieres ==
=== Austria, Germany, and Hungary ===
Die lustige Witwe premiered at the Theater an der Wien on 30 December 1905, with Mizzi Günther and Louis Treumann in the leading roles. They had starred as the romantic couple in several Viennese operettas, including Der Opernball and Léon and Lehár's successful Der Rastelbinder (1902). Both stars were so enthusiastic about The Merry Widow that they supplemented the theatre's low-budget production by paying for their own lavish costumes. During rehearsals, the theatre lost faith in the score and asked Lehár to withdraw it, but he refused. The operetta received little stage-rehearsal time. The cast also included Siegmund Natzler as Baron Zeta and Annie Wünsch as Valencienne. After a couple of shaky weeks at the box-office, the production became a success, earning good reviews and running for 483 performances. It toured in Austria in 1906.

Lily Elsie, London, 1907

In 1906, Max Monti staged the operetta at Hamburg's Neues Operetten-Theater and Berlin's Berliner Theater. It was also staged at Budapest's Magyar Színház in a faithful Hungarian translation. Monti's company then took it to Berlin's Theater des Westens, where it had over 600 consecutive runs, with Gustav Matzner as Danilo and Marie Ottmann as Hanna.

=== London and New York ===
In its English adaptation by Basil Hood, with lyrics by Adrian Ross, The Merry Widow became a sensation at Daly's Theatre in London, opening on 8 June 1907, starring Lily Elsie and Joseph Coyne and featuring George Graves as the Baron, Robert Evett as Camille and W. H. Berry as Nisch, with costumes by Lucile and Percy Anderson. Gabrielle Ray was a replacement as the Maxim's dancer Frou-Frou. It was produced by George Edwardes. The production ran for an extraordinary 778 performances in London and toured extensively in Great Britain.

The adaptation renamed many of the characters, to avoid offense to Montenegro, where the royal family's surname was Njegus, the crown prince was named Danilo, and Zeta was the principal founding state. Hood changed the name of the principality to Marsovia, Danilo is promoted to the title of Prince, Hannah is Sonia, the Baron is Popoff, Njegus is Nisch, Camille's surname is de Jolidon and Valencienne is Natalie, among other changes. The final scene was relocated into Maxim's itself, rather than the original theme-party setting, to take further advantage of the fame of the nightclub. Graves ad-libbed extensive "business" in the role of the Baron. Edwardes engaged Lehár to write two new songs, one of which, "Quite Parisien" (a third act solo for Nisch) is still used in some productions.

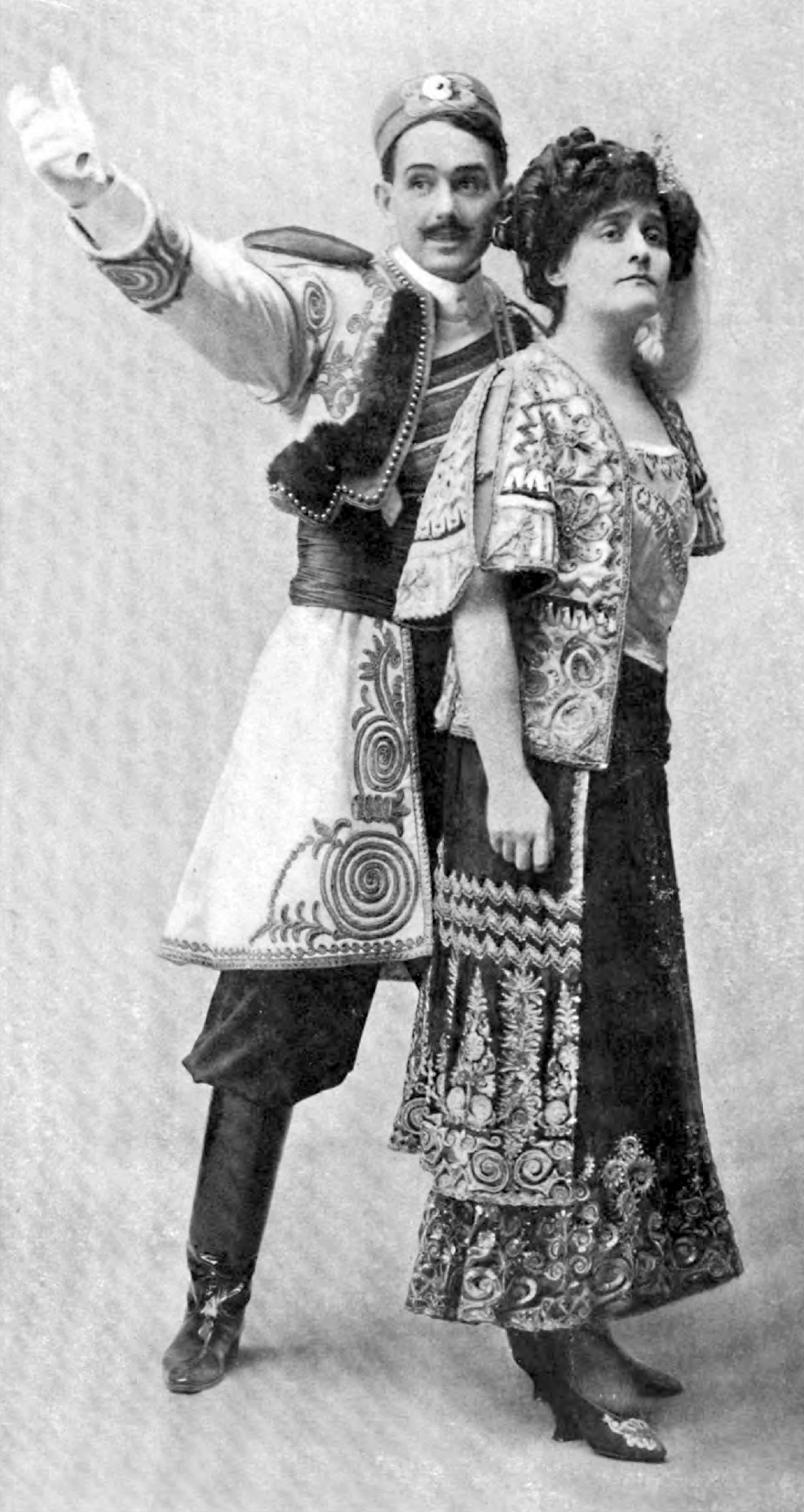
Donald Brian and Ethel Jackson in the original Broadway production (1907)

The first American production opened on 21 October 1907 at the New Amsterdam Theatre on Broadway for another very successful run of 416 performances, and was reproduced by multiple touring companies across the US, all using the Hood/Ross libretto. It was produced by Henry Wilson Savage. The New York cast starred Ethel Jackson as Sonia and Donald Brian as Danilo.

=== Further premieres and widespread success ===
The operetta became an international sensation, and translations were quickly made into various languages: in 1907, Buenos Aires theatres were playing at least five productions, each in a different language. The operetta first played in Australia in 1908 using the Hood/Ross libretto.

The Paris debut was at the Théâtre Apollo on 28 April 1909 as La Veuve joyeuse. Although Parisians worried about how their city would be portrayed in the operetta, this Paris production was well received and ran for 186 performances. In this translation, Hanna is an American raised in "Marsovie" named "Missia". Danilo was a prince with gambling debts. The third act was set in Maxim's. The following year, the operetta played in Brussels. Stockholm, Copenhagen, Milan, Moscow, and Madrid also mounted productions. It was eventually produced in every city with a theatre industry.

== Later revivals ==
The operetta has been staged frequently in English. It was revived in London's West End in 1923, running for 239 performances, and in 1924 and 1932. A 1943 revival ran for 302 performances. Most of these productions featured Graves as Popoff. Madge Elliott and Cyril Ritchard starred in the 1944 production, while June Bronhill and Thomas Round led the 1958 cast and recording. Lizbeth Webb and John Rhys Evans starred in a brief 1969 revival. Revivals were mounted in major New York theatres in 1921, 1929, 1931 and 1943–1944. The last of these starred Marta Eggerth and her husband Jan Kiepura, with sets by Howard Bay and choreography by George Balanchine. It ran for 322 performances at the Majestic Theatre and returned the next season at the New York City Center for another 32 performances.

In the 1970s, the Light Opera of Manhattan, a year-round professional light opera repertory company in New York City, commissioned Alice Hammerstein Mathias, the daughter of Oscar Hammerstein II, to create a new English adaptation, which was revived many times until the company closed at the end of the 1980s. Essgee Entertainment staged productions of The Merry Widow in capital cities around Australia during 1998 and 1999. A prologue was added featuring a narrative by Jon English and a ballet introducing the earlier romance of Anna and Danilo. The production opened in Brisbane, with Jeffrey Black as Danilo, Helen Donaldson as "Anna", Simon Gallaher as Camille and English as Baron Zeta. In some performances, during the production's Brisbane run, Jason Barry-Smith appeared as Danilo. In Melbourne, Sydney and Adelaide in 1999, John O'May appeared as Danilo, Marina Prior as "Hanna", Max Gillies as Zeta, Gallaher as Camille and Donaldson as Valencienne.

Numerous opera companies have mounted the operetta. New York City Opera mounted several productions from the 1950s through the 1990s, including a lavish 1977 production starring Beverly Sills and Alan Titus with a new translation by Sheldon Harnick. An Australian Opera production starred Joan Sutherland, and PBS broadcast a production by the San Francisco Opera in 2002, among numerous other broadcasts. The Metropolitan Opera had mounted the opera 18 times by 2003. The first performance by The Royal Opera in London was in 1997.

The Merry Widow is frequently revived in Vienna and is part of the Vienna Volksopera's repertory. The Volksopera released a complete live performance on CD, interpolating the "Can-Can" from Offenbach's Orpheus in the Underworld, which was copied in many other productions worldwide. Best known as Danilo in the German version was the actor Johannes Heesters, who played the part thousands of times for over thirty years.

== Recordings ==
The operetta has been recorded both live and in the studio many times, and several video recordings have been made. In 1906, the original Hanna and Danilo, Mizzi Günther and Louis Treumann, recorded their arias and duets, and also some numbers written for Camille and Valencienne; CD transfers were made in 2005. The first recording of a substantially complete version of the score was made of the Berlin 1907 production, with Ottmann and Matzner in their lead roles and Bruno Seidler-Winkler conducting the "Grammophon Streich-Orchester"; it includes a considerable amount of the operetta's dialogue. After that, excerpts appeared periodically on disc, but no new full recording was issued until 1950, when Columbia Records released a set sung in English with Dorothy Kirsten and Robert Rounseville.

In 1953, EMI's Columbia label released a near-complete version produced by Walter Legge, conducted by Otto Ackermann, with Elisabeth Schwarzkopf as Hanna, Erich Kunz as Danilo, Nicolai Gedda as Camille and Emmy Loose as Valencienne. It was sung in German, with abridged spoken dialogue. Loose sang Valencienne again for Decca in the first stereophonic recording, produced in 1958 by John Culshaw, with Hilde Güden, Per Grundén and Waldemar Kmentt in the other main roles, and the Vienna Philharmonic conducted by Robert Stolz. A second recording with Schwarzkopf as Hanna was issued by Columbia in 1963; the other main roles were sung by Eberhard Waechter, Gedda and Hanny Steffek. This set, conducted by Lovro von Matačić, has been reissued on CD in EMI's "Great Recordings of the Century" series. Among later complete or substantially complete sets are those conducted by Herbert von Karajan with Elizabeth Harwood as Hanna (1972); Franz Welser-Möst with Felicity Lott (1993); and John Eliot Gardiner with Cheryl Studer (1994).

The Ackermann recording received the highest available rating in the 1956 The Record Guide and the later EMI set under Matačić is highly rated by the 2008 The Penguin Guide to Recorded Classical Music, but Alan Blyth in his Opera on CD regrets the casting of a baritone as Danilo in both sets and prefers the 1958 Decca version. Among the filmed productions on DVD, the Penguin Guide recommends the one from the San Francisco Opera, recorded live in 2001, conducted by Erich Kunzel and directed by Lotfi Mansouri, with Yvonne Kenny as Hanna and Bo Skovhus as Danilo.

== Adaptations and editions ==
=== Translated editions ===
Glocken Verlag Ltd, London, published two different English translation editions in 1958. One English-language libretto is by Phil Park, which was adapted and arranged by Ronald Hanmer. The other is by Christopher Hassall, based on the edition by Ludwig Doblinger, Vienna. The Park version is a whole-tone lower than the original. Danilo and Hanna's hummed waltz theme becomes a chorus number, and the ending of the "Rosebud Romance" is sung mostly in unison rather than as a conversation. In the Hassall version, the action of act 3 takes place at Maxim's. Valencienne and the other Embassy wives arrive to seek out Danilo and convince him to return to Hanna, closely followed by their husbands, seeking to achieve the same purpose. The Grisettes, Parisian cabaret girls, make a grand entrance, led by the voluptuous ZoZo. Zeta finds the brokenhearted Danilo, and as they argue, Hanna enters. Hanna, Danilo and Zeta separately bribe the Maitre'd to clear the room so Hanna and Danilo can be alone. Danilo sets aside his pride and asks Hanna to give up Camille for the sake of the country. Much to Danilo's delight, Hanna tells him that she was never engaged to Camille, but that she was protecting the reputation of a married woman. Danilo is ready to declare his love for Hanna, and is on the point of doing so when he remembers her money, and stops himself. When Njegus produces the fan, which he had picked up earlier, Baron Zeta suddenly realizes that the fan belongs to Valencienne. Baron Zeta swears to divorce his wife and marry the widow himself, but Hanna tells him that she loses her fortune if she remarries. Hearing this, Danilo confesses his love for her and asks Hanna to marry him, and Hanna triumphantly points out that she will lose her fortune only because it will become the property of her husband. Valencienne produces the fan and assures Baron Zeta of her fidelity by reading out what she had replied to Camille's declaration: "I'm a highly respectable wife".

The operetta has also been translated into Italian (as La Vedova Allegra).

=== Ballet ===
With the permission of the Franz Lehár Estate, Sir Robert Helpmann adapted the operetta's story, while John Lanchbery and Alan Abbot adapted the operetta's music and composed additional music, for a three-act ballet. The Merry Widow ballet, choreographed by Ronald Hynd with designs by Desmond Heeley, was first performed on 13 November 1975 at the Palais Theatre, Melbourne, by The Australian Ballet. The ballet has been performed by American Ballet Theatre, among other major companies.

=== Literature ===
In 1909, a novelization of the 1907 American adaptation of The Merry Widow was published anonymously.

=== Films ===
Various films have been made that are based loosely on the plot of the operetta:

- Hungarian 1918 silent version by Michael Curtiz
- 1925, US, silent version by Erich von Stroheim, with John Gilbert as Danilo and Mae Murray as Hanna
- 1934, US, black-and-white version, by Ernst Lubitsch, starring Maurice Chevalier and Jeanette MacDonald; new lyrics were written by Lorenz Hart and Gus Kahn.
- 1952, US, version in Technicolor starring Lana Turner and Fernando Lamas
- 1962 Austrian version by Werner Jacobs

== Cultural references ==
- The theme of "Da geh' ich zu Maxim" was ironically cited by Shostakovich (The Merry Widow was Hitler's favourite operetta) in the first movement of his Symphony No. 7.
- "The Merry Widow Waltz" is a recurring theme in the 1943 films Shadow of a Doubt, directed by Alfred Hitchcock and scored by Dimitri Tiomkin, as well as in Heaven Can Wait by Ernst Lubitsch.
- Part of "The Merry Widow Waltz" is played by a music box and sung by the character Winnie in Samuel Beckett's play Happy Days.
- John Coltrane recorded a jazz version of the "Vilja Song", re-titled "Vilia" on March 6, 1963 that was not released until 2018's Both Directions at Once: The Lost Album.
