= Gabrielle Ray =

English actress dancer and singer (1883–1973)

- Portrait, c. 1910
- Born: Gabrielle Elizabeth Clifford Cook; 28 April 1883; Cheadle, Stockport, England
- Died: 21 May 1973 (aged 90); Egham, Surrey, England
- Occupation: Actress
- Years active: 1893–1912; 1915–1924

Gabrielle Ray (born Gabrielle Elizabeth Clifford Cook, 28 April 1883 – 21 May 1973) was an English stage actress, dancer and singer, best known for her roles in Edwardian musical comedies.

Ray was considered one of the most beautiful actresses on the London stage and became one of the most photographed women in the Edwardian era. In the first decade of the 20th century, she had a successful career in musical theatre but left the stage upon marrying Eric Raymond Loder in 1912. Following her divorce in 1914, she returned to theatre but never regained her early fame. She later struggled with depression and was committed to Holloway Sanatorium, spending her final 37 years there.

== Biography ==
Ray was born the fourth child of William Austin Cook and Anne Maria Elizabeth née Holden in Cheadle in Stockport, England. Known as 'Gabs' to family and friends, Her father was a prosperous iron merchant and a Justice of the Peace for Cheshire.

=== Early career ===
Ray first appeared in London's West End at the age of ten as Eveleen in John Hollingshead's musical play Miami at the Royal Princess's Theatre. This was followed by juvenile roles in a series of plays in London and on tour. The next year, she played a role in A Celebrated Case. She was also a dancer in the Blackpool ballet. At the Richmond Theatre from 1893, she played Cupid in Little Red Riding Hood, Adrienne in Proof, and Cissie in The Silver King, among other plays and pantomimes. In 1899, she appeared in Sinbad the Sailor at the Hammersmith Lyric Opera House. Manager Ben Greet noticed her dancing skills and engaged her to tour with his company. With Greet, she toured for three years in the roles of Mamie Clancy in The Belle of New York and Dolly Twinkle in The Casino Girl (1901). Ray was back at the Lyric in 1902 to play the title character in the pantomime Little Red Riding Hood.

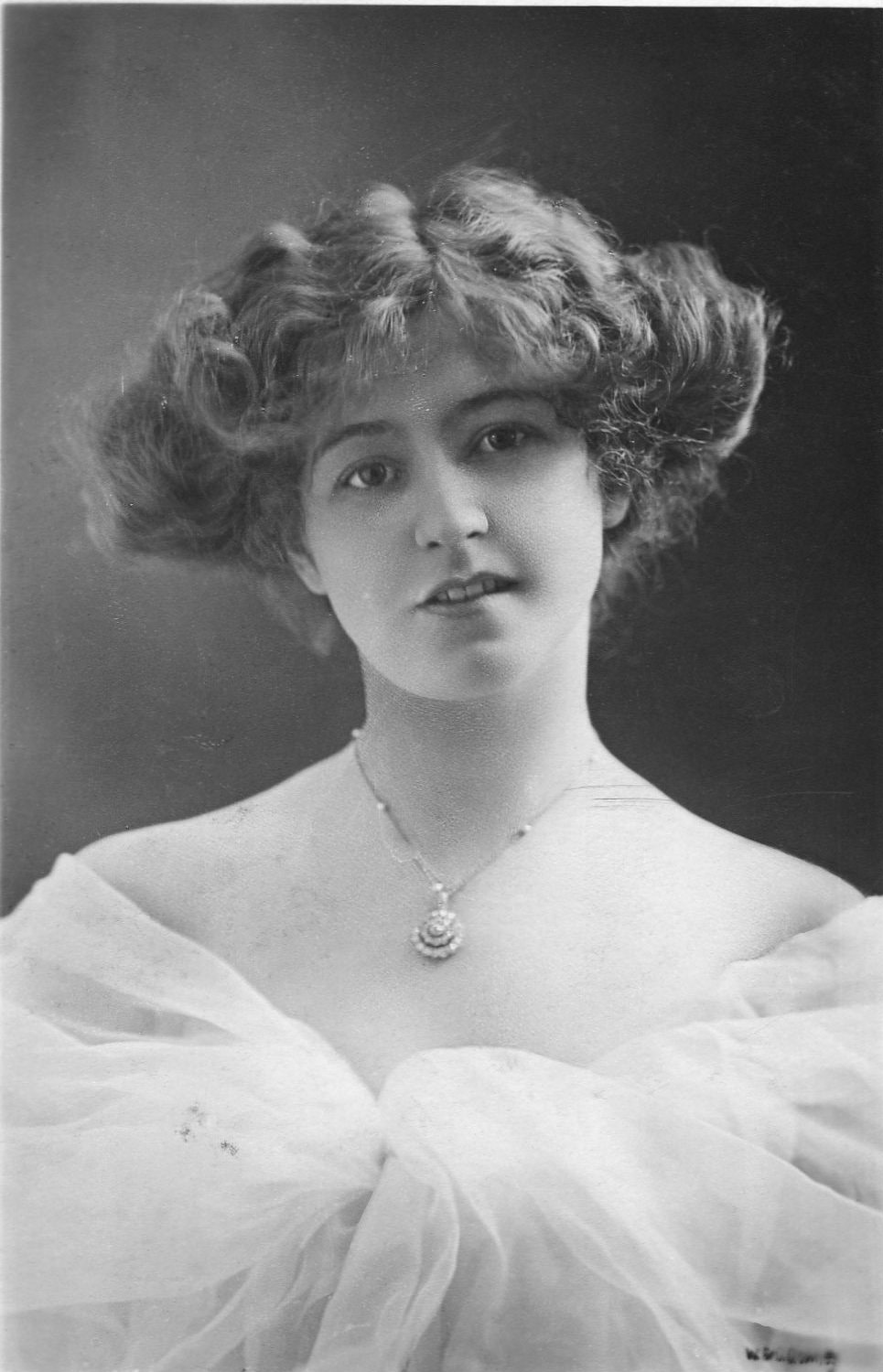
Ray in the early 1900s

During the first decade of the 20th century, Ray's career had progressed to the point where she was performing at West End venues and gaining attention as a young dancer and actress. Known throughout Europe for her beauty, she was admired by men such as Alfred Gwynne Vanderbilt and King Manuel of Portugal. She became one of the most photographed women of the early 20th century.

George Edwardes hired Ray to understudy Gertie Millar in The Toreador at the Gaiety Theatre, London, in 1902, where she had the chance to play the role on many occasions. She then took over for Letty Lind in The Girl from Kays at the Apollo Theatre, earning good notices for her graceful, acrobatic dancing in particular. Next, she earned considerable fame playing Thisbe in the hit musical The Orchid (1903), where she danced in pink pyjamas while singing "The Pink Pyjama Girl". She continued to appear in Edwardes' productions in 1905 and 1906, including three successes at the Prince of Wales Theatre: Lady Madcap (1905, in which she performed a popular Parisian dance, "La Maxixe"), Lady Dorothy Congress in The Little Cherub (1906) and So-Hie in See See (1906). The same year she also played Eglé in The Merveilleuses. In 1907, Ray played Frou Frou in Edwardes' adaptation of The Merry Widow, which ran for 778 performances at Daly's Theatre. Ray's dance number, complete with handstands and high kicks, all performed on a table at Maxim's held head high by four men, was a show stopper. Next she was Daisy in The Dollar Princess (1909) at Daly's and Polly in Peggy (1911) at the Gaiety.

=== Marriage and later years ===
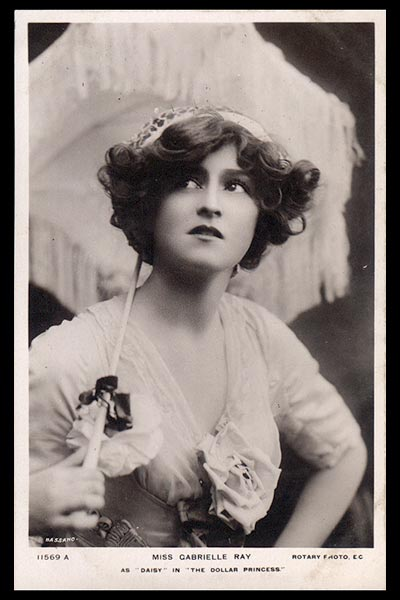
As Daisy in The Dollar Princess

Ray announced her retirement to marry the wealthy Eric Raymond Loder (1888–1966) in early 1912 and left the production of Peggy. She did not appear at the well-attended scheduled wedding ceremony at St Edwards Roman Catholic Church in Windsor because of Loder's failure to sign the prenuptial contract that guaranteed her financial security, but he claimed it was an oversight, and the marriage took place three days later. In 1913 Loder committed adultery and deserted Ray, ignoring her letters pleading with him to return to her. She filed for restitution of conjugal rights, but Loder did not respond to the legal order, and the couple divorced in 1914.

In 1915, Ray returned to the stage to play the role of Estelle in the musical Betty at the Gaiety Theatre and, in the following year, appeared in the revue Flying Colours at the London Hippodrome. These were her last appearances in the West End, but for nearly a decade afterwards, she appeared occasionally in provincial variety tours and pantomimes, finally leaving the stage about 1924. Roles during this decade included Maid Marian in Babes in the Wood at Prince's Theatre in Bradford at Christmas 1919 and Mother Goose at the Theatre Royal, Manchester, at Christmas 1920.

After this, Ray struggled with depression and alcohol abuse. In 1936 she suffered a mental breakdown and was institutionalised for 37 years at Holloway Sanatorium in Egham, Surrey. In 1939 she was listed there as "Incapacitated". Registered as Mrs Eric Loder, at least part of her long stay at the sanatorium was happy. Ray continued to care for her personal appearance, having a liking for smart clothes and hats. Other Gaiety Girls visited her, including Gertie Millar and Lily Elsie, but she was never visited by family members. Hospital staff later recalled her infectious smile and that she enjoyed walks into the nearby village for shopping and car rides. After her death one of her nurses said, "she was a very quiet lady, small and neat, who did not give any indication of the high life she must have enjoyed".

Ray died in 1973 at the Holloway Sanatorium at the age of 90 and was buried in Englefield Green cemetery. In her will she left £17,441. A blue plaque has been erected on the site of her birth.
