= Tatjana (opera) =

Opera by Franz Lehár

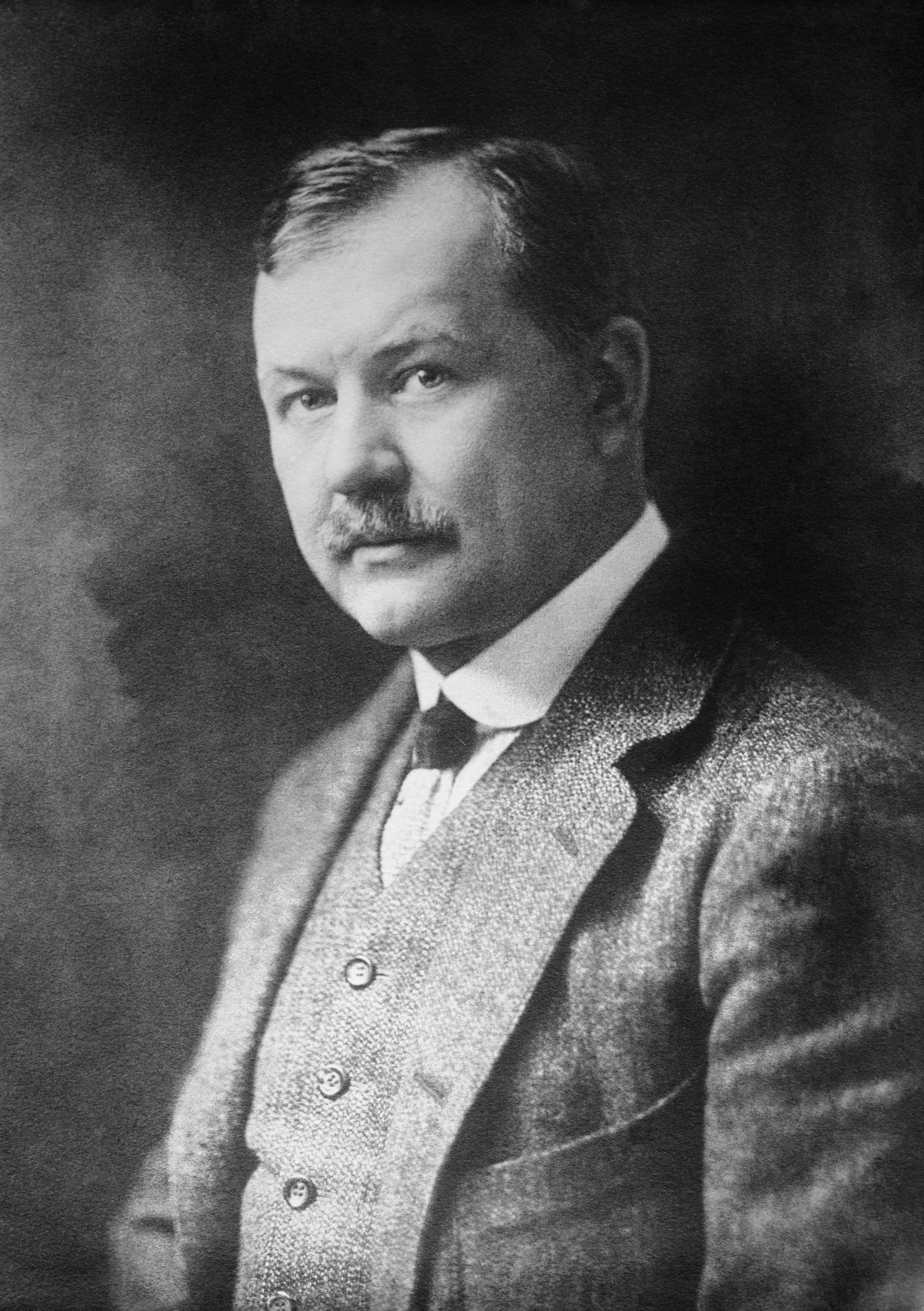
Franz Lehár

Kukuschka (1896), better known in a revised version as Tatjana (1905), is the earliest opera of Franz Lehár. The plot for the opera was drawn by librettist Felix Falzari from American journalist and explorer George Kennan's writings about his six years in Siberia, including Siberia and the Exile System (1891). Kukuška is the Russian word for cuckoo.

Kukuška, an opera in 3 acts, was first performed 27 November 1896 at the Leipzig Stadttheater. The revised work, Tatjana, with changes to the libretto by Max Kalbeck was premiered 21 February 1905 in Brno, at the German Brünn Stadttheater.
