= Louis Treumann =

Austrian singer

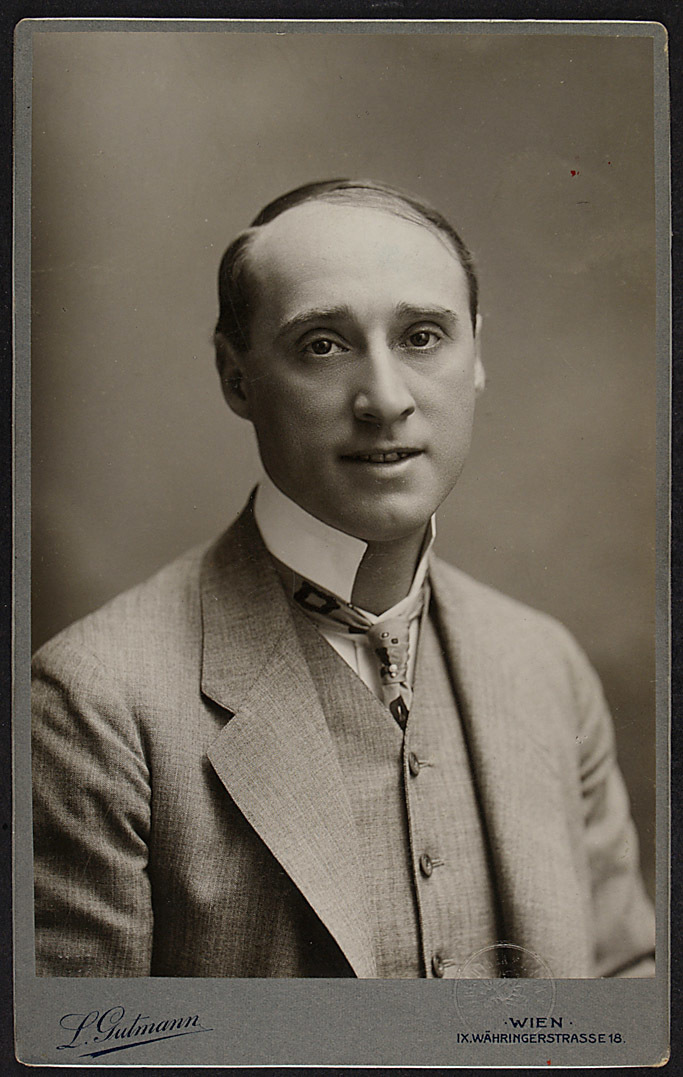
Treumann in 1908

Louis Treumann (born Alois Pollitzer, 3 March 1872 – 5 March 1943) was an Austrian actor and operetta tenor. Treumann and his wife spent their last months in a Nazi concentration camp, dying a few months apart.

Born in Vienna, Treumann was the son of Jewish merchants. He spent his twenties working backstage and in smaller roles, before achieving his breakthrough in 1902 in Franz Lehár's Der Rastelbinder opposite Mizzi Günther.

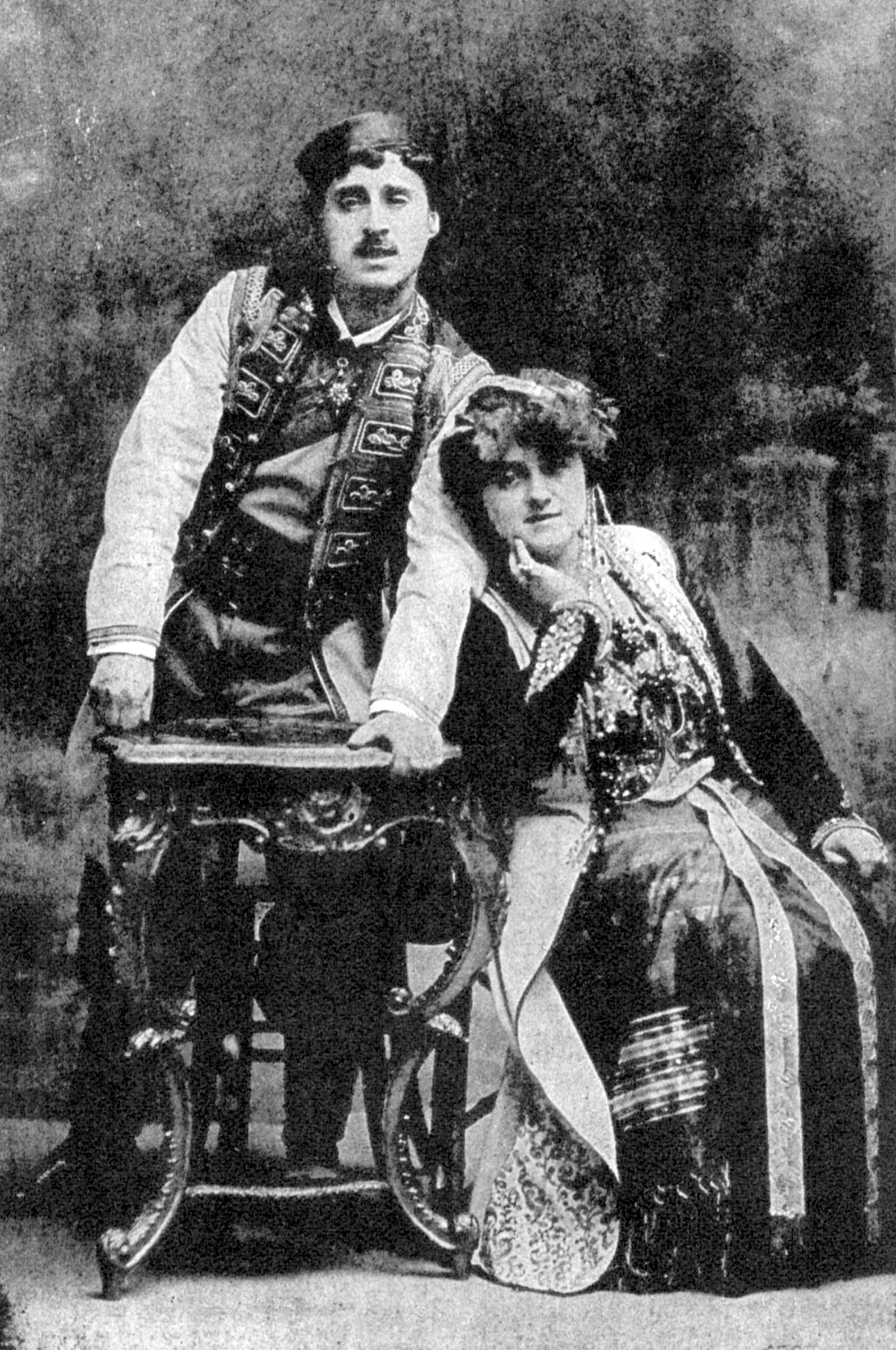
Treumann with Mizzi Gunther in The Merry Widow, 1906

In 1905 he created the role of Count Danilo Danilovitsch in Lehár's Die lustige Witwe (The Merry Widow).

During the second half of the 1920s he appeared in several silent films, such as Der Rastelbinder (1927), Flucht in die Fremdenlegion (1929), Spiel um den Mann (1929), Trust der Diebe (1929), Katharina Knie (1929) and Die Warschauer Zitadelle (1930). During the 1930s, as a Jew, his opportunities to perform suffered, and his final appearance was in 1935.

In 1942 he was arrested and taken to a transit camp. His colleague, the actor Theo Lingen was able to get him released, but soon afterwards he was arrested again. He was repeatedly scheduled for transport to a concentration camp, each time saved by influential friends such as Franz Lehár. However on 28 July 1942, aged 70 years old, Treumann was finally deported to the Theresienstadt Ghetto with his wife Stefanie. She died two months later, and her death plunged Treumann into a deep depression. On 5 March 1943, still in Theresienstadt, he too died.

In 1955, Treumanngasse in Vienna's Hietzing district was named after him.

== Recordings ==
- Franz Lehár, "O Vaterland, du machst bei Tag" from The Merry Widow. Louis Treumann and Orchestra, cond. Franz Hampe (1906) (MP3; 1.3 MB)
- Franz Lehár, "Lippen schweigen" from The Merry Widow. Mizzi Günther, Louis Treumann and Orchestra, cond. Franz Hampe (1906) (MP3; 1.7 MB)
