= Louise Kartousch =

Austrian dancer, opera, operetta soprano

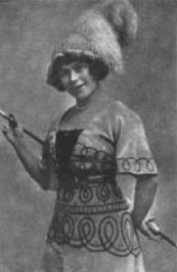
- Born: 17 August 1886; Linz, Austria
- Died: 13 February 1964 (aged 77); Vienna, Austria
- Burial place: Hietzing Cemetery
- Occupation(s): Dancer, singer

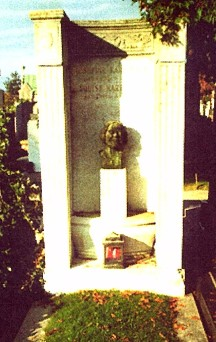
Kartousch's gravesite

Louise Kartousch (17 August 1886 – 13 February 1964) was an Austrian character dancer, opera and operetta soprano.

== Life ==
Born in Linz, Kartousch attended the music school in Linz and was trained in Vienna. She had children's roles in Linz and from 1902 worked as a second soubrette in Graz, where she also appeared in opera (for example as a Walküre). From 1907 to 1921, she performed at the Theater an der Wien in Lehár's, Fall's and Kálmán's operettas. She was described as a "soubrette of race and temperament" and the press highlighted her joy of playing and dancing. Kartousch also performed at the Raimundtheater, the Volksoper Wien and the Theater in der Josefstadt.

Kartousch died in Vienna at the age of 77. Her grave is located at the Hietzing Cemetery.

== Operettas ==
- Zigeunerliebe
- Herbstmanöver
- Wo die Lerche singt
- Der Graf von Luxemburg
- Die Dollarprinzessin
- Das Land des Lächelns
- Auf Befehl der Kaiserin
- Madame Pompadour
