= Where the Lark Sings (operetta) =

Operetta by Franz Lehár

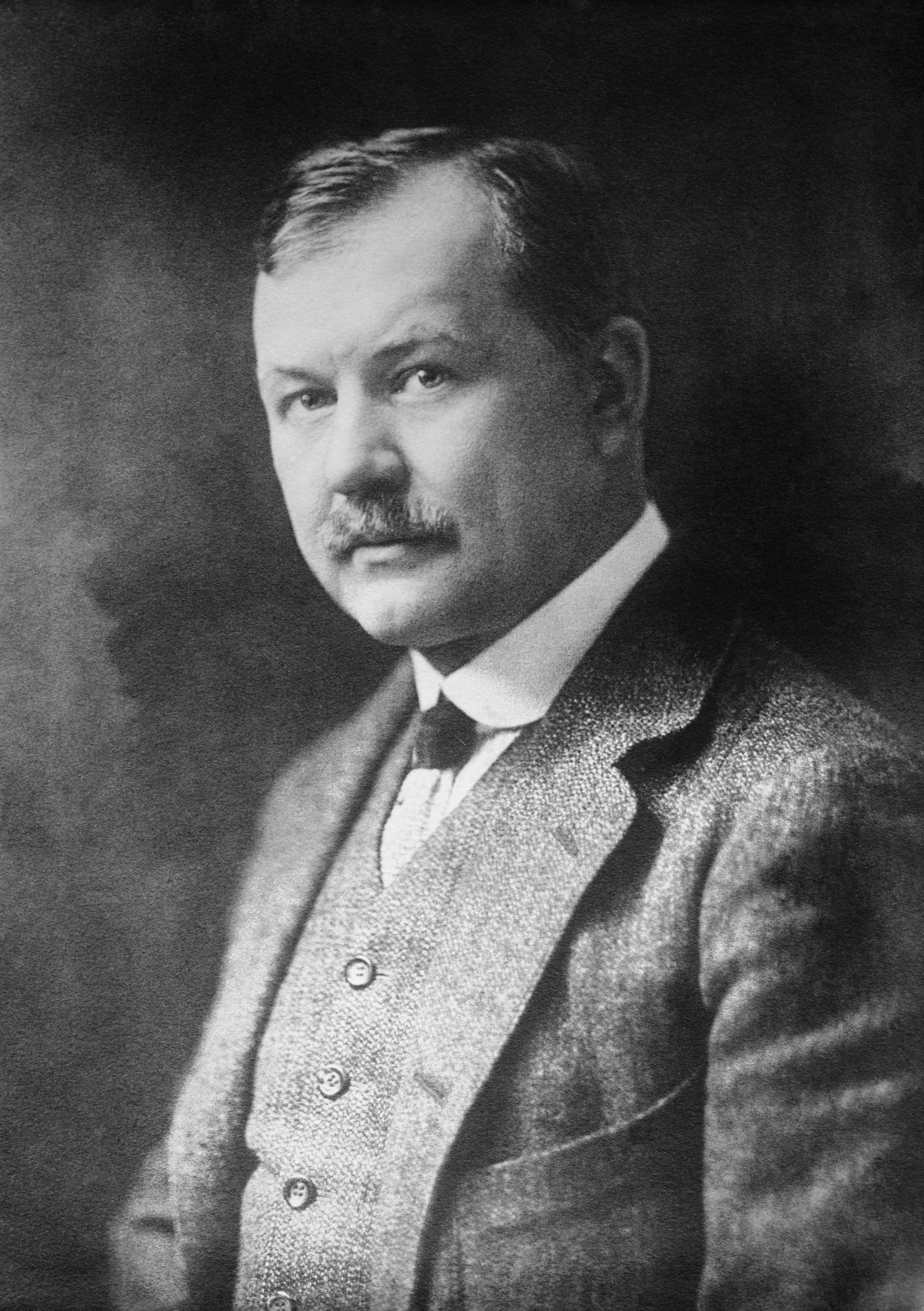
Franz Lehár, likely sometime between 1915 and 1920

Where the Lark Sings (German: Wo die Lerche singt, Hungarian: A pacsirta) is a 1918 operetta by the Hungarian composer Franz Lehár. The libretto by A. M. Willner and Heinz Reichert was inspired by Dorf und Stadt by Charlotte Birch-Pfeiffer. The work premiered at the Király Theatre in Budapest on 1 January 1918. It was one of Lehár's most successful wartime operettas.

Margit, a young Hungarian country girl travels to a major city where she is seduced and then abandoned by an artist. Eventually she returns home to the countryside "where the larks sing" and is reconciled with her peasant fiancé Pista.

== Film adaptation ==
In 1936 the work was adapted into an operetta film Where the Lark Sings directed by Carl Lamac. It was a co-production between Hungary, Germany and Switzerland.
