= Mizzi Günther =

Austrian opera singer

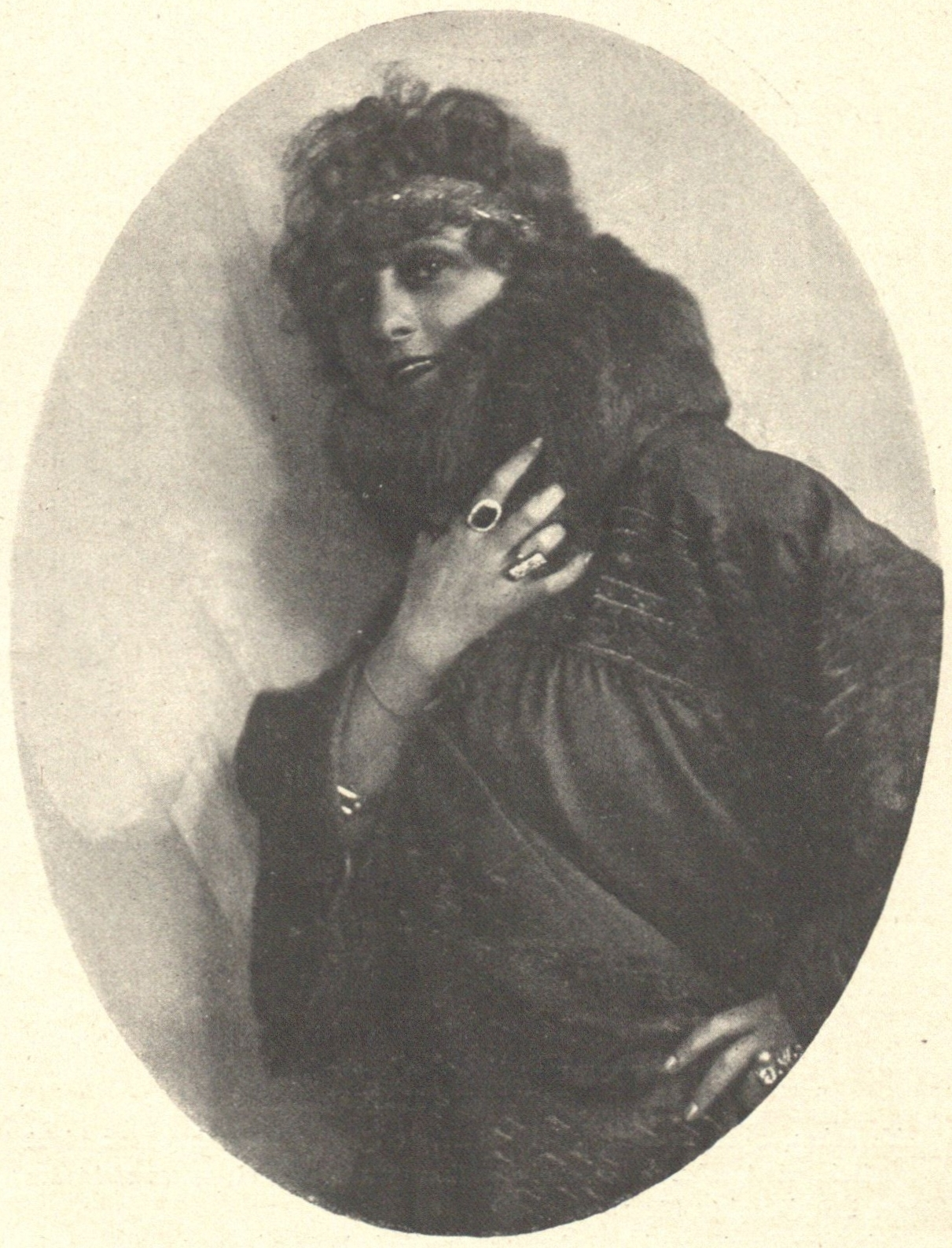
Mizzi Günther, 1918

Mizzi Günther (8 February 1879 – 18 March 1961) was a Bohemian-Viennese operetta soprano.

Günther was born in Warnsdorf, Bohemia (now the Czech Republic). Her debut was in 1897 in Hermannstadt, now Sibiu, the part of the Austro-Hungarian Empire now in Romania. She achieved stardom in Vienna in 1901 as O Mimosa San in The Geisha. She subsequently sang in England, France and Russia.

She created the title roles of Franz Lehár's The Merry Widow in 1905 and Leo Fall's Die Dollarprinzessin (1907), also appearing in the premieres of Fall's Die fidele Bauer (1908) and Emmerich Kálmán's Der kleine König (1912) and Die Csárdásfürstin (1915).

She died in Vienna, Austria, and is buried on the Zentralfriedhof.

== Recordings ==
From 1903 to 1911, Günther recorded ten 78 rpm sides of music from The Merry Widow, Heinrich Reinhardt's Der liebe Schatz, Leo Ascher's Vergeltsgott and Franz Lehár's Eva.

== Sources ==
- Steane, J. B. (1992), "Günther, Mizzi" in The New Grove Dictionary of Opera, ed. Stanley Sadie (London) ISBN 0-333-73432-7
