= Franz Lehár =

Austro-Hungarian composer (1870–1948)

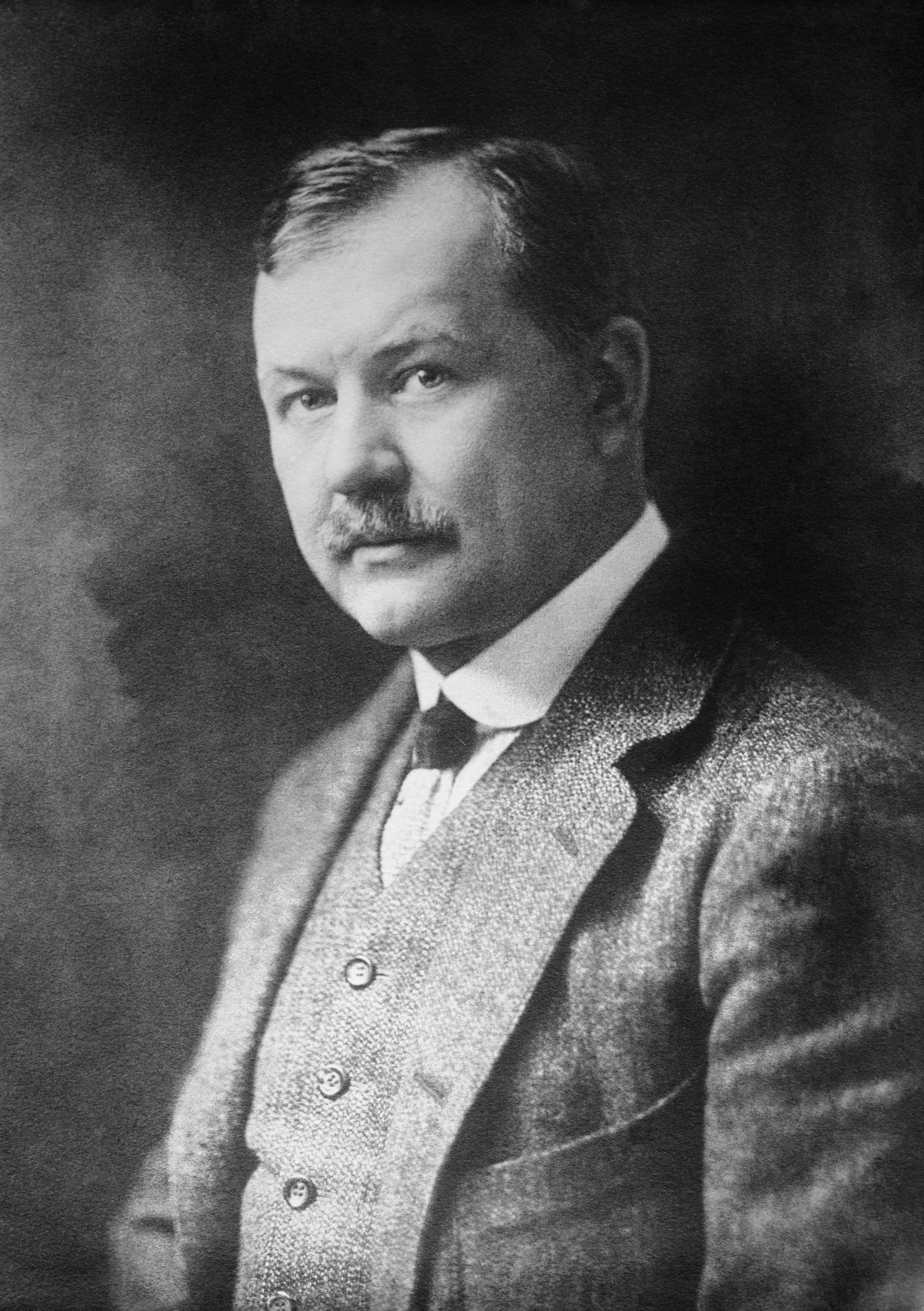
- Lehár, likely sometime between 1915 and 1920
- Born: 30 April 1870; Komárom, Kingdom of Hungary
- Died: 24 October 1948 (aged 78); Bad Ischl, Austria
- Occupation: Composer
- Works: The Merry Widow (1905); The Land of Smiles (1929); Giuditta (1934)

Franz Lehár (/ˈleɪhɑːr/ LAY-har; Hungarian: Lehár Ferenc [ˈlɛhaːr ˈfɛrɛnt͡s]; 30 April 1870 – 24 October 1948) was an Austro-Hungarian composer. He is mainly known for his operettas, of which the most successful and best known is The Merry Widow (Die lustige Witwe).

== Life and career ==
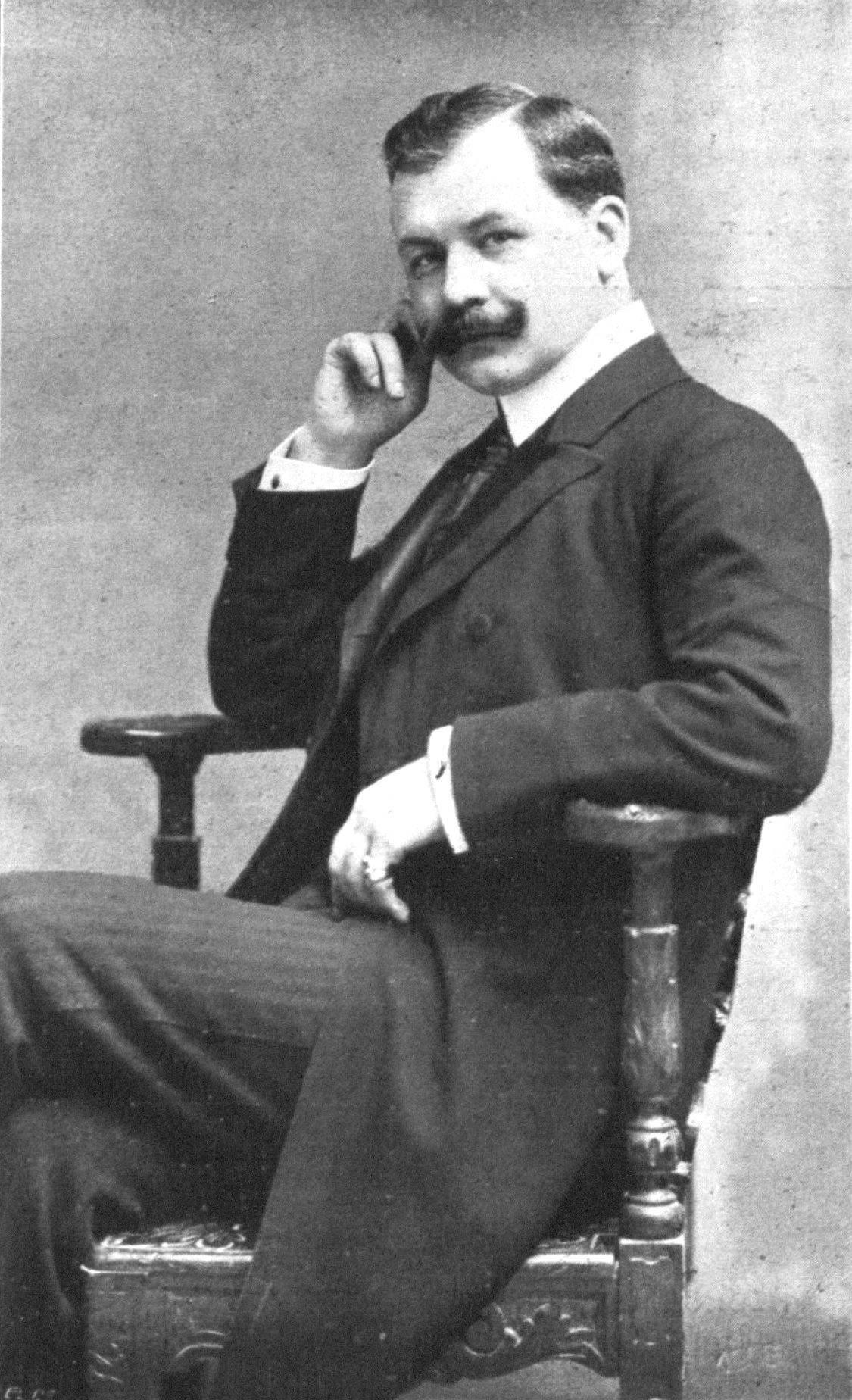
Lehár in 1906

Lehár was born in the northern part of Komárom, Kingdom of Hungary (now Komárno, Slovakia), (Note: Komárom, the Hungarian form of the name of his birthplace, is now used for the former suburb on the south bank of the Danube in Hungary; the old town centre is now in Slovakia and is referred to as Komárno.) the eldest son of Franz Lehar Sr. (1838–1898), an Austrian bandmaster in the Infantry Regiment No. 50 of the Austro-Hungarian Army and Christine Neubrandt (1849–1906), a Hungarian woman from a family of German descent. He grew up speaking only Hungarian until the age of 12. He later put an acute accent above the a of his father's surname Lehar to indicate the pronunciation of the vowel as /aː/, in accordance with Hungarian orthography.

While his younger brother Anton entered cadet school in Vienna to become a professional officer, Franz studied violin at the Prague Conservatory, where his violin teacher was Antonín Bennewitz, but was advised by Antonín Dvořák to focus on composition. However, the Conservatory's rules at that time did not allow students to study both performance and composition, and Bennewitz and Lehár senior exerted pressure on Lehár to take his degree in violin as a practical matter, arguing that he could study composition on his own later. Lehár followed their wishes, against his will, and aside from a few clandestine lessons with Zdeněk Fibich he was self-taught as a composer. After graduation in 1888 he joined his father's band in Vienna, as assistant bandmaster. Two years later he became bandmaster at Losonc (today Lučenec, Slovakia), making him the youngest bandmaster in the Austro-Hungarian Army at that time, but he left the army and joined the navy. With the navy he was first Kapellmeister at Pola (Pula) from 1894 to 1896, resigning in the later year when his first opera, Kukuschka (reworked as Tatjana in 1906), premiered in Leipzig. It was only a middling success and Lehár eventually rejoined the army, with service in the garrisons at Trieste, Budapest (1898) and finally Vienna from 1899 to 1902. In 1902 he became conductor at the historic Vienna Theater an der Wien, where his operetta Wiener Frauen was performed in November of that year.

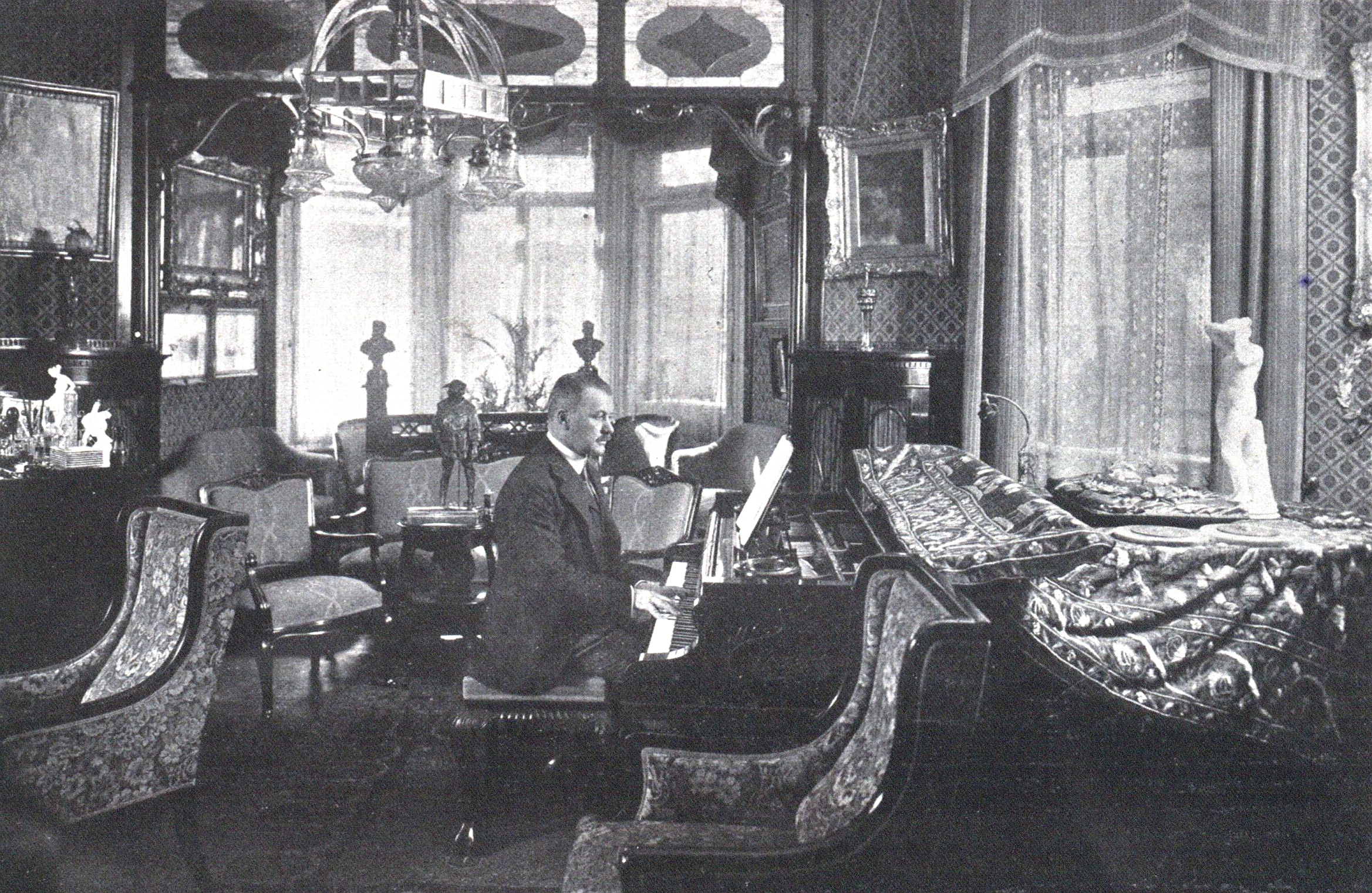
Lehár at the piano in his apartment in Vienna, 1918

He is most famous for his operettas – the most successful of which is The Merry Widow (Die lustige Witwe) – but he also wrote sonatas, symphonic poems and marches. He also composed a number of waltzes (the most popular being Gold und Silber, composed for Princess Pauline von Metternich's "Gold and Silver" Ball, January 1902), some of which were drawn from his famous operettas. Individual songs from some of the operettas have become standards, notably "Vilja" from The Merry Widow and "You Are My Heart's Delight" ("Dein ist mein ganzes Herz") from The Land of Smiles (Das Land des Lächelns). His most ambitious work, Giuditta in 1934 is closer to opera than to operetta. It contains the ever popular "Meine Lippen, sie küssen so heiß" ("My lips, they kiss so hot").

Lehár was also associated with the operatic tenor Richard Tauber, who sang in many of his operettas, beginning with a revival of his 1910 operetta Zigeunerliebe in 1920 and then Frasquita in 1922, in which Lehár once again found a suitable post-war style. Lehár made a brief appearance in the 1930 film adaptation The Land of Smiles starring Tauber. Between 1925 and 1934 he wrote six operettas specifically for Tauber's voice. By 1935 he decided to form his own publishing house, Glocken-Verlag (Publishing House of the Bells), to maximize his personal control over performance rights to his works.

=== Lehár and the Third Reich ===
Lehár's relationship with the Nazi regime was an uneasy one. He had always used Jewish librettists for his operas and had been part of the cultural milieu in Vienna which included a significant Jewish contingent. Further, although Lehár was Roman Catholic, his wife, Sophie (née Paschkis) had been Jewish before her conversion to Catholicism upon marriage, and this was sufficient to generate hostility towards them personally and towards his work. Hitler enjoyed Lehár's music, and hostility diminished across Germany after Joseph Goebbels' intervention on Lehár's part. In 1938 Mrs. Lehár was given the status of "Ehrenarierin" (honorary Aryan by marriage). Nonetheless, attempts were made at least once to have her deported.

The Nazi regime was aware of the uses of Lehár's music for propaganda purposes: concerts of his music were given in occupied Paris in 1941. Even so, Lehár's influence was limited. It is alleged that he tried personally to secure Hitler's guarantee of the safety of one of his librettists, Fritz Löhner-Beda, but he was not able to prevent the murder of Beda in Auschwitz-III. He also tried to prevent the arrest of Louis Treumann, the first Danilo in The Merry Widow, but the 70-year old Treumann and his wife Stefanie were sent to Theresienstadt concentration camp on 28 July 1942, where Stefanie died in September of that year and Louis died on 5 March 1943.

On 12 January 1939 and 30 April 1940, Lehár personally received awards from Hitler in Berlin and Vienna, including the Goethe Medal. On Hitler's birthday in 1938, Lehár had given him as a special gift a red Morocco leather volume in commemoration of the 50th performance of The Merry Widow.

=== Later years ===
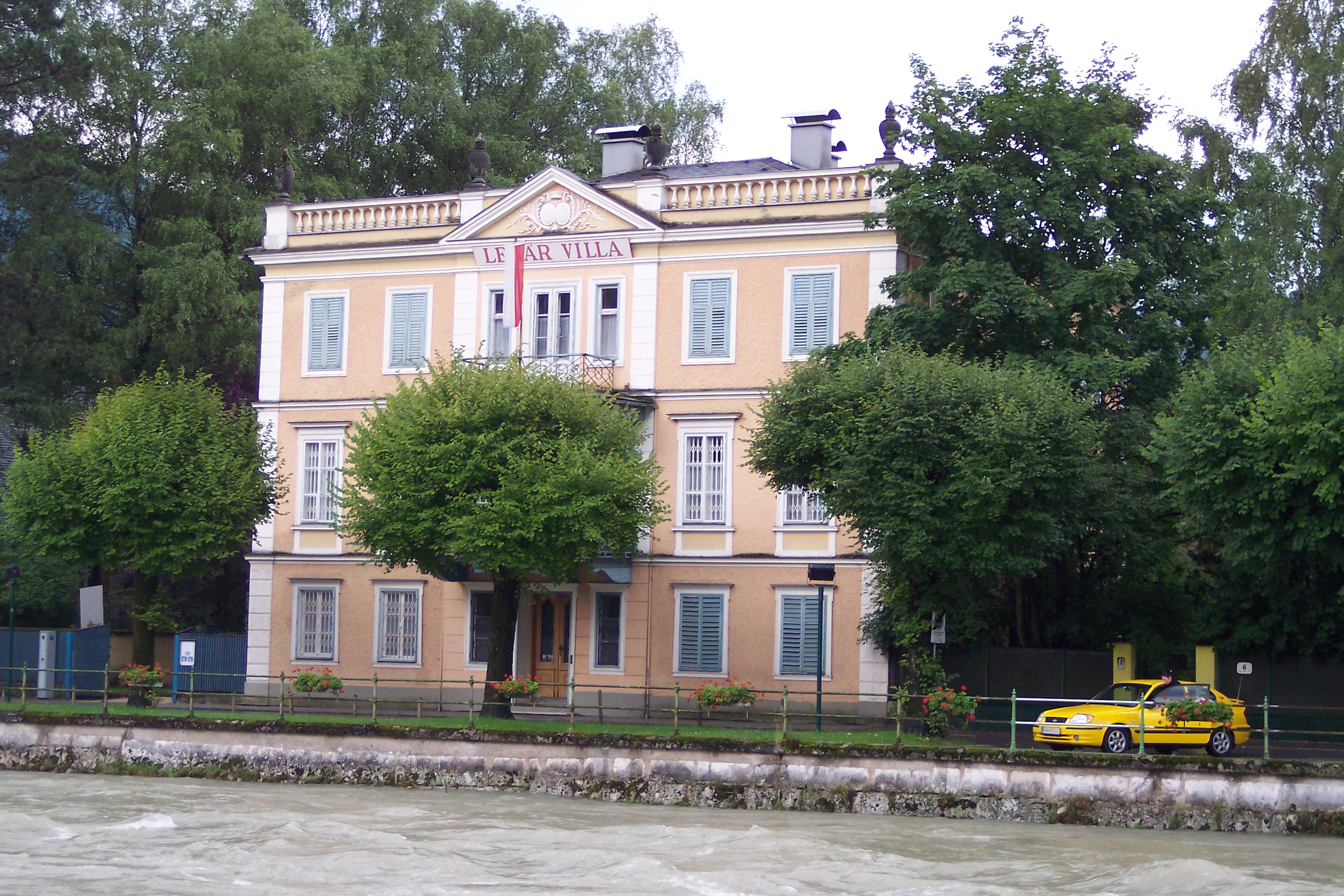
Lehár Villa in Bad Ischl (near Salzburg), the composer's summer residence from 1912, now a museum

He died aged 78 from a heart failure in 1948 in Bad Ischl, near Salzburg, and was buried there. His younger brother Anton became the administrator of his estate, promoting the popularity of Franz Lehár's music.

== Honours ==
- He was elected an honorary citizen of Sopron in 1940.
- In 1940 Hitler awarded him the Goethe-Medaille für Kunst und Wissenschaft.
- There is a street in Vienna named after him. Additionally, several towns in the Netherlands have named streets after him (e.g. in The Hague, Leidsche Rijn, Utrecht, Eindhoven and Tilburg). Also, there are streets in Sarajevo and Pula named after him, and in Prague as well.
- Asteroid 85317 Lehár, discovered by German astronomer Freimut Börngen in 1995, was named in his memory. The official naming citation was published by the Minor Planet Center on 23 May 2005 (M.P.C. 54177).

== Lehár recording ==
External audio
- The Merry Widow, Lovro von Matačić conducting the Philharmonia Orchestra with Elisabeth Schwarzkopf, Eberhard Waechter and Nicolai Gedda in 1963

In 1908, Deutsche Grammophon, the German branch of The Gramophone Company Ltd (His Master's Voice) issued twelve extracts (mostly ensembles) from Lehár's latest operetta, Der Mann mit den drei Frauen, with the composer conducting. The singers included Mizzi Günther, Louise Kartousch and Ludwig Herold.

In 1929 and 1934, Lehár had conducted for Odeon Records The Land of Smiles and Giuditta, starring Richard Tauber, Vera Schwarz and Jarmila Novotná. A 1942 Vienna broadcast of his operetta Paganini conducted by the composer has survived, starring soprano, Esther Réthy and tenor, Karl Friedrich. A 1942 Berlin radio production of Zigeunerliebe with Herbert Ernst Groh, conducted by Lehár, also survives.

In 1947, Lehár conducted the Tonhalle-Orchester Zürich in a series of 78-rpm recordings for English Decca (released in the U.S. by London Records) of overtures and waltzes from his operettas. The recordings had remarkable sound for their time because they were made using Decca's Full Frequency Range Recording process, one of the first commercial high fidelity techniques. These recordings were later issued on LP (in 1969 on Decca eclipse ECM 2012 and reprocessed stereo on ECS 2012) and CD. A compilation of his recordings has been released by Naxos Records.

Following the collapse of the Berlin Wall, a set of discs recording the 1939 Saarbrücken concert of Lehár's works by German State Transmitter Saarbrücken conducted by Franz Lehár himself was discovered in East German state archives. This was released on CDs by Classic Produktion Osnabrück in 2000.

== Anecdotes ==
Gustav Mahler and his young wife Alma went to see Lehár's The Merry Widow in Vienna and loved it so much that they danced to its tunes as soon as they were home. From memory they played the waltz on the piano, but could not remember the exact run of one passage. The next day they went to Vienna's main music shop Doblinger, but hesitated to admit that they were looking for the score of what would be considered a "popular" operetta. While Mahler distracted the staff by questioning them about the sales of his own compositions, Alma browsed through the music score of The Merry Widow. As soon as they were out on the street, Alma sang the complete waltz to Mahler.

== Balanchine's "Vienna Waltzes" ==
The fourth section of George Balanchine's 1977 ballet Vienna Waltzes is set to Lehar's Gold and Silver Waltz.
