= Bela Jenbach =

Hungarian actor and librettist (1871–1943)

Bela Jenbach, real name Béla Jacobowicz (1 April 1871 in Miskolc, Kingdom of Hungary – 21 January 1943 in Vienna) was an Austrian actor and operetta librettist of Hungarian origin.

Jenbach was of Jewish origin and the brother of the screenwriter Ida Jenbach. He was co-author of several well-known operetta libretti. Jenbach died in the Auersperg Sanatorium in Vienna and was buried in the Matzleinsdorf Protestant Cemetery.

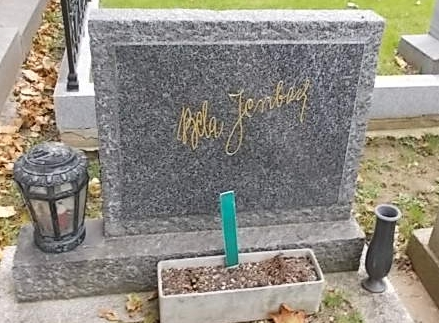
Jenbach's headstome

== Life ==
Jenbach came to Vienna at the age of 18. At first he kept himself busy with casual work. He invested his earnings in speech lessons and proved to be an extremely talented student, as he managed to lose his accent in a very short time. The foundation for his career was laid and he was engaged by the Vienna Burgtheater. He took this opportunity to change his name from Jacobowicz to Jenbach. He hoped for greater recognition and did not want to be immediately associated with his Jewish roots.

Depressed about the low earnings as a Burgtheater actor he came via the "Operettenbörse" in Café Sperl to write libretti. He would rather have become a recognized author of spoken dramas, but the work for operetta composers was simply more lucrative.

During the Nazi period his working conditions became worse and worse. Jenbach had a Catholic wife and a daughter. He did not think of emigrating. From 1940, he hid in a cellar near Vienna's Kaunitzgasse. After three years in this involuntary dungeon, Jenbach felt severe physical pain. He was admitted to hospital with stomach cancer in its final stage and died there on 21 January 1943.

His wife, the actress Anna Brandstätter, survived him by only eight days; she died of breast cancer on 29 January 1943. They had a daughter, Lydia Jenbach.

A statue of Jenbach was unveiled in Miskolc on May 11, 2024.

== Works ==
=== Operettas ===
- The Lilac Domino, 1912 (with Emerich von Gatti); music by Charles Cuvillier
- Ein Tag im Paradies, 1913 (with Leo Stein); music by Edmund Eysler (adapted on Broadway as The Blue Paradise)
- Die Csárdásfürstin, 1915 (with Leo Stein); music by Emmerich Kálmán
- Das Hollandweibchen, 1920 (with Leo Stein); music by Emmerich Kálmán
- Die blaue Mazur, 1920 (with Leo Stein); music by Franz Lehár
- Clo-Clo, 1924; music by Franz Lehár
- Paganini, 1925 (with Paul Knepler); music by Franz Lehár
- Der Zarewitsch, 1927 (with Heinz Reichert, based on a play by Gabriela Zapolska); music by Franz Lehár
- Die Fahrt in die Jugend, 1933 (with Ludwig Hirschfeld); music by Eduard Künneke

=== Comedy ===
- Der Herr ohne Wohnung, 1913 (with Rudolf Österreicher)

== Filmography ==
- The Gentleman Without a Residence, directed by Fritz Freund (Austria, 1915, based on the play Der Herr ohne Wohnung)
- The Csardas Princess, directed by Emil Leyde (Germany, 1919, based on the operetta Die Csárdásfürstin)
- The Gentleman Without a Residence, directed by Heinrich Bolten-Baeckers (Germany, 1925, based on the play Der Herr ohne Wohnung)
- The Csardas Princess, directed by Hanns Schwarz (Germany/Hungary, 1927, based on the operetta Die Csárdásfürstin)
- The Tsarevich, directed by Luise Fleck and Jacob Fleck (Germany, 1929, based on the operetta Der Zarewitsch)
- The Tsarevich, directed by Victor Janson (German, 1933, based on the operetta Der Zarewitsch)
  - Imperial Highness, directed by Victor Janson and Jean Bernard-Derosne (French, 1933, based on the operetta Der Zarewitsch)
- The Csardas Princess, directed by Georg Jacoby (German, 1934, based on the operetta Die Csárdásfürstin)
  - Princesse Czardas, directed by Georg Jacoby and André Beucler (French, 1934, based on the operetta Die Csárdásfürstin)
- Paganini (Gern hab' ich die Frau'n geküßt), directed by E. W. Emo (Germany, 1934, based on the operetta Paganini)
- The Gentleman Without a Residence, directed by E. W. Emo (Austria, 1934, based on the play Der Herr ohne Wohnung)
- Die Fahrt in die Jugend, directed by Carl Boese (Austria, 1935, based on the operetta Die Fahrt in die Jugend)
- The World's in Love, directed by Victor Tourjansky (Austria, 1935, based on the operetta Clo-Clo)
- Dreams Come True, directed by Reginald Denham (UK, 1936, based on the operetta Clo-Clo)
- The Lilac Domino, directed by Frederic Zelnik (UK, 1937, based on the operetta The Lilac Domino)
- Who's Your Lady Friend?, directed by Carol Reed (UK, 1937, based on the play Der Herr ohne Wohnung)
- Silva, directed by Aleksandr Ivanovsky (Soviet Union, 1944, based on the operetta Die Csárdásfürstin)
- The Csardas Princess, directed by Georg Jacoby (West Germany, 1951, based on the operetta Die Csárdásfürstin)
- The Little Czar, directed by Arthur Maria Rabenalt (West Germany/France, 1954, based on the operetta Der Zarewitsch)
- Paganini, directed by Theodor Grädler (West Germany, 1961, TV film, based on the operetta Paganini)
- The Csardas Princess, directed by Miklós Szinetár (West Germany/Hungary, 1971, TV film, based on the operetta Die Csárdásfürstin)
- Paganini, directed by Eugen York (West Germany, 1973, TV film, based on the operetta Paganini)
- Der Zarewitsch, directed by Arthur Maria Rabenalt (West Germany, 1973, TV film, based on the operetta Der Zarewitsch)
- Silva, directed by Yan Frid (Soviet Union, 1981, based on the operetta Die Csárdásfürstin)

== Bibliography ==
- H. Giebisch, L. Pichler, K. Vancsa (editor): Kleines österreichisches Literaturlexikon. Brüder Hollinek, Vienna 1948.
- Felix Czeike: Historisches Lexikon Wien. volume 3. Kremayr & Scheriau, Vienna 1994.
