= The Csardas Princess =

The Csardas Princess is the English title of Die Csárdásfürstin, an operetta by Hungarian composer Emmerich Kálmán.

It may also refer to the following films based on the operetta:

- The Csardas Princess (1927 film), German-Hungarian silent film
- The Csardas Princess (1934 film), German film
- The Csardas Princess (1951 film), German film
