= The Gentleman Without a Residence =

The Gentleman Without a Residence may refer to:

- The Gentleman Without a Residence (1915 film), an Austrian silent film
- The Gentleman Without a Residence (1925 film), a German silent comedy film
- The Gentleman Without a Residence (1934 film), an Austrian comedy film
