= Alexander Shiryaev =

Russian ballet dancer (1867–1941)

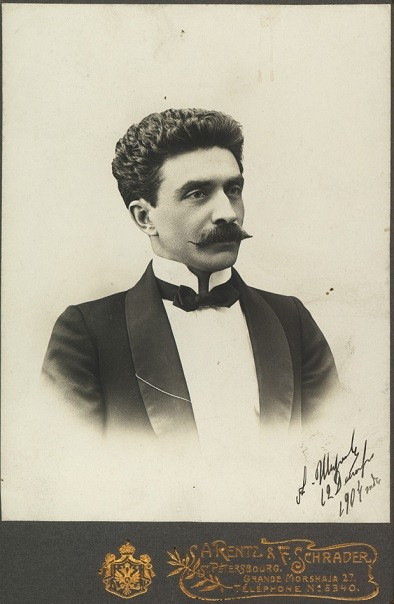
- Alexander Shiryaev's signed photo (12 December 1904)
- Born: Alexander Viktorovich Shiryaev; 10 September 1867; Saint Petersburg, Russian Empire
- Died: 25 April 1941 (aged 73); Leningrad, USSR
- Occupations: Ballet dancer, ballet master, choreographer, animator

Alexander Viktorovich Shiryaev (Russian: Александр Викторович Ширяев; 10 September [O.S. 29 August] 1867 – 25 April 1941) was a Russian ballet dancer, ballet master and choreographer, founder of character dance in Russian ballet who served at the Mariinsky Theatre. Shiryaev was also a pioneering animation director who is credited with the invention of stop motion animation.

== Early life ==
Alexander Viktorovich Shiryaev was born to a long line of artists involved in the ballet. He was the son of the flautist Hector (Viktor) Cesarevich Puni, who played for the St. Petersburg Imperial Bolshoi Theatre's orchestra; and dancer Ekaterina Ksenophontovna Shiryaeva, a member of the corps de ballet. Alexander Shiryaev was the grandson of the Italian composer of ballet music Cesare Pugni and his English wife Marion Linton, who came to Russia with the renowned ballerina Fanny Elssler and the balletmaster Jules Perrot in 1851. According to the Soviet ballerina Ninel Yultyeva, he was an illegitimate child, raised under his mother's surname. Alexander's cousin Ivan Puni was a well-known Russian avant-garde artist.

At the age of nine Alexander entered the Saint Petersburg Imperial Theatrical School where he studied under Marius Petipa, Pavel Gerdt, Platon Karsavin and Lev Ivanov. He graduated in 1885 and in a year became a member of the Mariinsky Theatre troupe.

== Ballet career ==
Shiryaev quickly rose to fame. During the studies he already managed to learn almost the entire repertoire of Mariinka, thus he easily substituted solo performers, both in classical and character roles. Shiryaev's musical talent and extraordinary visual memory gained him a place of Marius Petipa's assistant and tutor. He easily recollected all movements, reconstructing and finishing ballets after his teacher. He helped to stage The Seasons, Harlequinade, The Trial of Damis, among others. As a ballet master he helped Petipa to bring back such ballets as Coppélia, The Little Humpbacked, The Pharaoh's Daughter, Tsar Kandavl or Le Roi Candaule and Giselle.

Around the same time he became deeply interested in character dance. In 1891 Shiryaev, aged 24, opened and headed the first character class under the Theatrical School. He studied and implemented elements of Russian, Hungarian, Spanish and other national dances into his ballets.

He was the first performer of the Buffoon part in The Nutcracker (the role was edited out from later productions) which he also staged, gaining praise from Pyotr Ilyich Tchaikovsky himself. He also performed the buffoon dance from Mlada, Russian dance from Dubrovsky, dance of jesters and skomorokhs from The Merchant Kalashnikov and other operas directed by Lev Ivanov. Some of his famous ballet performances include Carabosse in The Sleeping Beauty, Ivanushka in The Little Humpbacked Horse, Quasimodo in La Esmeralda, Harlequin in Harlequinade, Dr. Coppélius in Coppélia and Abderakhman in Raymonda.

In 1905 a new director of Imperial Theatres made Shiryaev leave the theatre. After that Shiryaev spent a lot of time touring around Europe. He also opened a training school in London; his students later joined the troupe led by Anna Pavlova. After the October Revolution he worked both as a dancer and a pedagogue in the Mariinsky and Alexandrinsky Theatres, restoring forgotten ballets. In 1921 he left the stage and became a teacher at the Leningrad Choreographic Institute where he had worked for the rest of his life. Among his students were such acclaimed artists as Michel Fokine, Fyodor Lopukhov, Pyotr Gusev, Galina Ulanova, Yury Grigorovich, Nina Anisimova.

== Animation ==
During his 1904—1905 visits to London Shiryaev acquired a 17.5 mm film Biokam camera and started filming ballets, as well as making home movies involving his family, comedy and trick films. His suggestion to film primary dancers of the Mariinka for free was rejected by the theatre management.

After that he built an improvised studio at his apartment where he carefully recreated various ballets by staging them using hand-made dolls which he created from either clay or papier-mâché; they were 20–25 cm (7.9–9.8 in) tall, and their body parts were connected by thin wire which provided plasticity. He then filmed them on camera, frame by frame. In the process he also made thousands of sketches, catching every movement, also turning them into a filming reel so that one could watch the entire dance in form of a cartoon.

From 1906 to 1909 Shiryaev produced a number of pioneering stop motion and traditionally animated films. This happened at least several years before Ladislas Starevich — another influential Russian animator who had been long credited with invention of stop motion animation — produced his first films. Although Shiryav didn't hold much interest in animation as an art form, but rather saw it as an instrument in studying human plastics, using his films for educational purposes.

During the Soviet period those films were mostly forgotten, although Fyodor Lopukhov and some other memoirists mentioned his animation experiments in their books. Ninel Yultyeva described how Shiryaev produced around 1700 drawings and filmed them just to demonstrate one complex dance to his students. For a Hindu dance from La Bayadère he prepared clay figures and made them repeat every movement on camera; his film was later used during the restoration of Marius Petipa's ballet at the Mariinsky Theatre.

In 1995 a Russian documentarist and ballet historian Viktor Bocharov started researching information on Shiryaev's animation experiments. He was soon contacted by Daniil Savelyev, a ballet photographer who personally knew the family. He got hold of the entire archive from the last wife of Alexander Shiryaev's son and kept it safe. Bocharov spent many years trying to get financing from Roskino in order to restore the films and produce a documentary.

In 2003 he finally released the one-hour movie entitled A Belated Premiere which included fragments of different films by Shiryaev. Around 2008 Bocharov finally managed to get fundings from the Pordenone Silent Film Festival in order to restore the negatives. Around the same time he got in contact with Aardman Animations who also became involved in restoration and digitizing process. The films were subsequently shown at various international film festivals.

== Personal life and memory ==
Alexander Shiryaev was married twice. His first wife was a ballerina Natalia M. Matveeva who also performed at the Mariinsky Theatre. Their only daughter who had also trained as a character dancer drowned in 1912, and his wife died of grief shortly after. In 1924 he married a drama actress R. Pomerantseva, but, according to the ballerina Ninel Yultyeva, the marriage was also unhappy; after Ninel's mother and father — a well-known Soviet writer Daut Yulty and a close friend of Shiryaev's — were arrested in 1937 as "Bashkir bourgeois nationalists", she was raised by Shiryaev who called her his granddaughter.

Shiryaev played a small part of choreographer Skripochkin in the 1923 drama film Comedienne directed by Aleksandr Ivanovsky.

In 1938 he published a textbook Basics of Character Dance together with Alexander Bocharov and Andrei Lopukhov. It was re-released in 2007.

In 1941 Shiryaev prepared a book of memoirs St. Petersburg Ballet. From Reminiscences of the Mariinsky Theatre Artist. It was meant to be published by the Union of Theatre Workers, but was postponed. The copy had been kept safe in the National Library of Russia and was first published in 2004 in the Notes by Film Historian magazine No. 67.

After his death the school theatre under the Vaganova Academy of Russian Ballet became known as A. V. Shiryaev's Training Theatre. In 2016 the name became official.

== Filmography (1905–1909) ==
=== Staged comedies ===
- The Befuddled Film-Maker (35mm positive, 30")
- Circus Artists (17.mm negative, 36")
- The Clown and the Elephant (17.5mm negative, 1’42"; 17.5mm positive, 1’30")
- The Crocodile (17.5mm positive, 38")
- Drunkards (17.5mm positive, 1’15")
- The Fisherman's Dream (17.5mm positive, 4’20")
- An Interrupted Dinner (17.5mm positive, 2’58")
- The Lodger and the Spider (17.5mm positive, 1’52")
- The Naughty Girl and Granny (17.5mm positive, 2’02")
- The Tomboy (17.5mm positive, 2’45")
- A Troublesome Couple (17.5mm negative, 2’53")
- A Wet Romance (17.5mm positive, 1’27")

=== Trick films ===
- Boy in a Sack (17.5mm positive, 52")
- Chairs (35mm positive, 20")
- The Enchanted Tea Table (17.5mm positive, 42")
- Magical Dressing (17.5mm negative, 35")
- Pierrot and the Maid (17.5mm positive, 2’02")
- Pierrot and the Maid (variant version) (17.5mm negative, 1’52")

=== Dance films ===
- Character Dance (35mm positive, 2’20")
- Character Dance (35mm positive, 1’50")
- Character Dance (Solo) (35mm positive)
- Character Dance with Fan (17.5mm negative, 2’01")
- Character Dance with Tambourine (17.5mm negative, 1’10")
- Cossack Dance (17.5mm negative, 1’09")
- "Dance of the Little Corsair" from Le Corsaire (35mm positive, 60")
- Folk Courtship Dance 1 (35mm positive, 1’30")
- Folk Courtship Dance 2 (17.5mm negative, 44")
- “Fool’s Dance” from Petipa's Mlada (35mm positive, 1’02")
- “Fool’s Dance” from Petipa's Mlada (17.5mm negative, 1’06")

=== Puppet animation ===
- "Baby Dance" from Die Puppenfee (35mm positive and negative, 1’17")
- "Hindu Dance" from La Bayadère (35mm positive and negative, 3’)
- Mulatto Woman (35mm positive and negative, fragment)
- Pierrot-Artists (35mm positive and negative, 5’35")
- Pierrot-Artists (35mm positive and negative, 3’10)
- Harlequin's Jest (35mm positive and negative, in 5 scenes): Cassandre's Garden (3’11"); A Forest (1’55"); A Cave in the Grotto (48"); Cassandre's House (2’16"); The Marriage of Harlequin and Columbine (5’40")
- Two Pierrots Playing Ball (35mm positive and negative, 1’17")

=== Paper films ===
- Birds in Flight (2")
- Snake (5")
- Buffoon's Dance from The Nutcracker (1’30")
- Cakewalk (1’04")

== Other ==
=== Leningrad Choreographic Institute (1920s) ===
- Character Pas de deux (17.5mm positive, 58")
- Coppélia (animated dolls) (17.5mm positive, 53")
- La Fille mal gardée (17.5mm positive, 60")
- Pas de trois (17.5mm positive, 24")
- Les Sylphides (17.5mm positive, 45")
- Woman Dancer with Snake (17.5mm positive, 10")

=== Roles ===
- 1923 — Comedienne — actor (choreographer Skripochkin)
- 2003 — A Belated Premier — self (archive footage)

== See also ==
- Russian ballet
- Mariinsky Ballet
- Character dance
- History of Russian animation

== Sources ==
- Alexander Shiryaev (1941). St. Petersburg Ballet. From Reminiscences of the Mariinsky Theatre Artist. — Notes by Film Historian No. 67, 2004, pp. 61–101 ISSN 0235-8212
- Birgit Beumers, Victor Bocharov, David Robinson (2009). Alexander Shiryaev: Master of Movement. — Gemona: Le Giornate del Cinema Muto, 176 pages ISBN 9788886155267
