= Sabre Dance =

Movement in Khachaturian's ballet Gayane

- by Aram Khachaturian
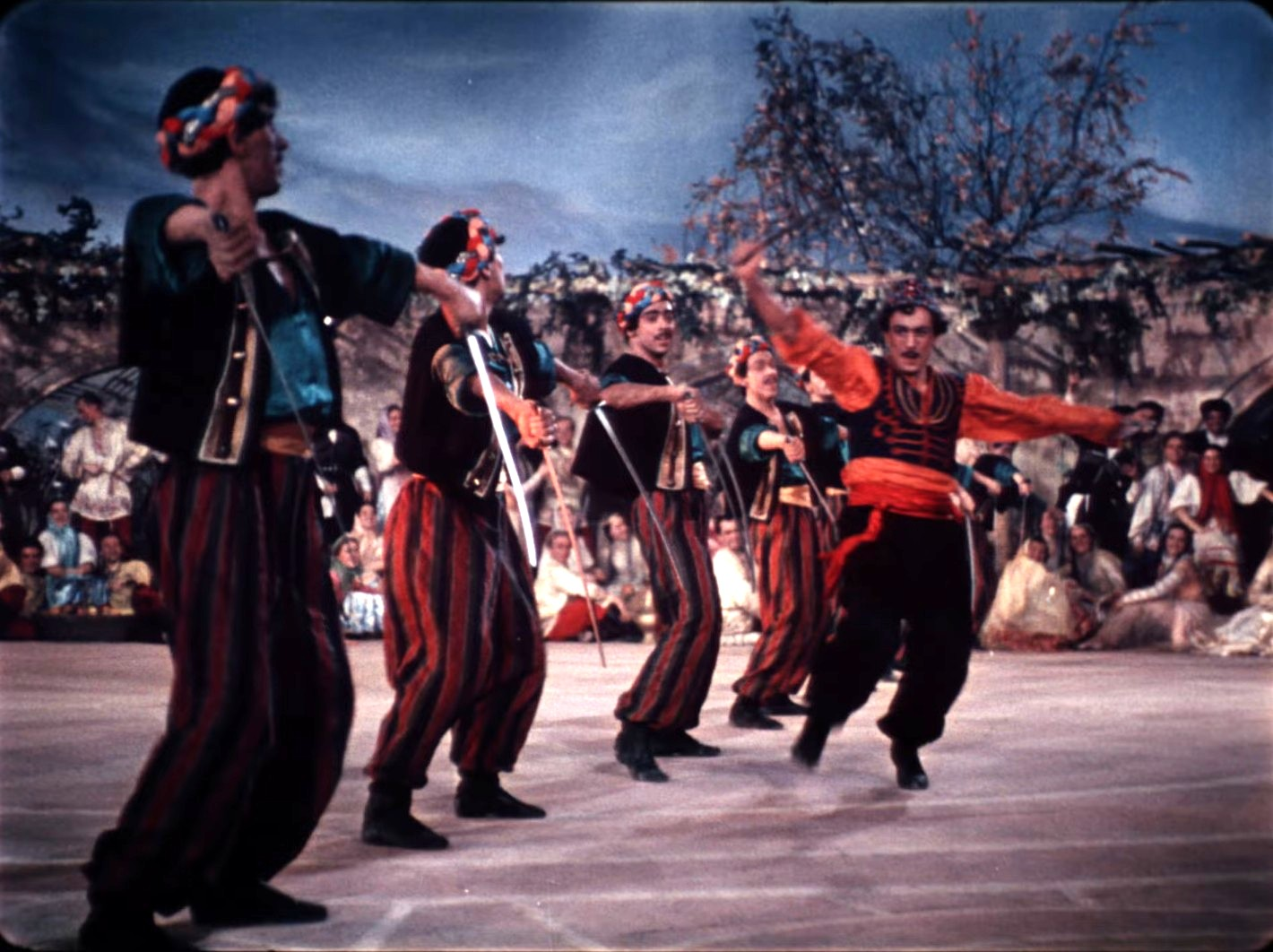
- Sabre Dance, by the Kirov Ballet in a 1952 Soviet film-concert
- Related: Gayane
- Composed: 1942
- Performed: December 9, 1942, Perm Opera and Ballet Theatre

"Sabre Dance" (Note: Also spelled Saber Dance in American English and less commonly translated as "Dance with Sabres" or "Sword Dance". Russian: Танец с саблями, Tanets s sablyami. Armenian: Սուսերով պար, Suserov par; less commonly Սրերով պար, Srerov par.) is an orchestral movement from the final act of the Aram Khachaturian 1942 ballet Gayane, in which dancers display their skill with sabres. It is Khachaturian's most recognizable work worldwide and is considered one of the signature pieces of twentieth-century popular music. The composition is a fast-paced work, lasting about two and a half minutes, and incorporates elements of Armenian folk music.

The piece achieved widespread popularity in the United States in 1948, becoming a classical hit with orchestral recordings and a piano version by Oscar Levant, and a jukebox sensation with charting versions by pop artists such as Woody Herman. It has been widely adapted across genres and instruments, including for violin by Jascha Heifetz, for piano by György Cziffra, and in a hit rock cover by Dave Edmunds. Over decades, its extensive use on screen and in popular culture has made it a "global musical shorthand for cartoonish urgency" and a staple for variety acts. It is used in sports by the Buffalo Sabres ice hockey team and in figure skating. Khachaturian expressed ambivalence about the piece overshadowing his other works.

== Background ==
"Sabre Dance" appears in Act IV of Gayane, (Note: Also spelled Gayne and Gayaneh) a ballet written by Khachaturian that is based on his first ballet, Happiness (1939). With a libretto by Konstantin Derzhavin. Gayane premiered on December 9, 1942 at the Perm Opera and Ballet Theatre. Set on a collective farm (kolkhoz) in Soviet Armenia, it centers on a patriotic young woman, Gayane, and her husband, Giko. The drama unfolds when Giko betrays the Soviet regime by joining a band of smugglers and setting fire to the family farm. In a mounting frenzy, he nearly kills Gayane and their daughter before they are rescued by Kazakov, a Red Army border patrol commander. After the capture of Giko, Kazakov, who loves Gayane, marries her. "Sabre Dance" occurs at their wedding party, an "exuberant celebration of folk dance", along with Armenian Shalakho and Uzundara, Caucasian Lezginka, Russian plyaska, and Ukrainian Gopak (Hopak). This deliberately multi-ethnic programme symbolises the Soviet concept of the friendship of peoples.

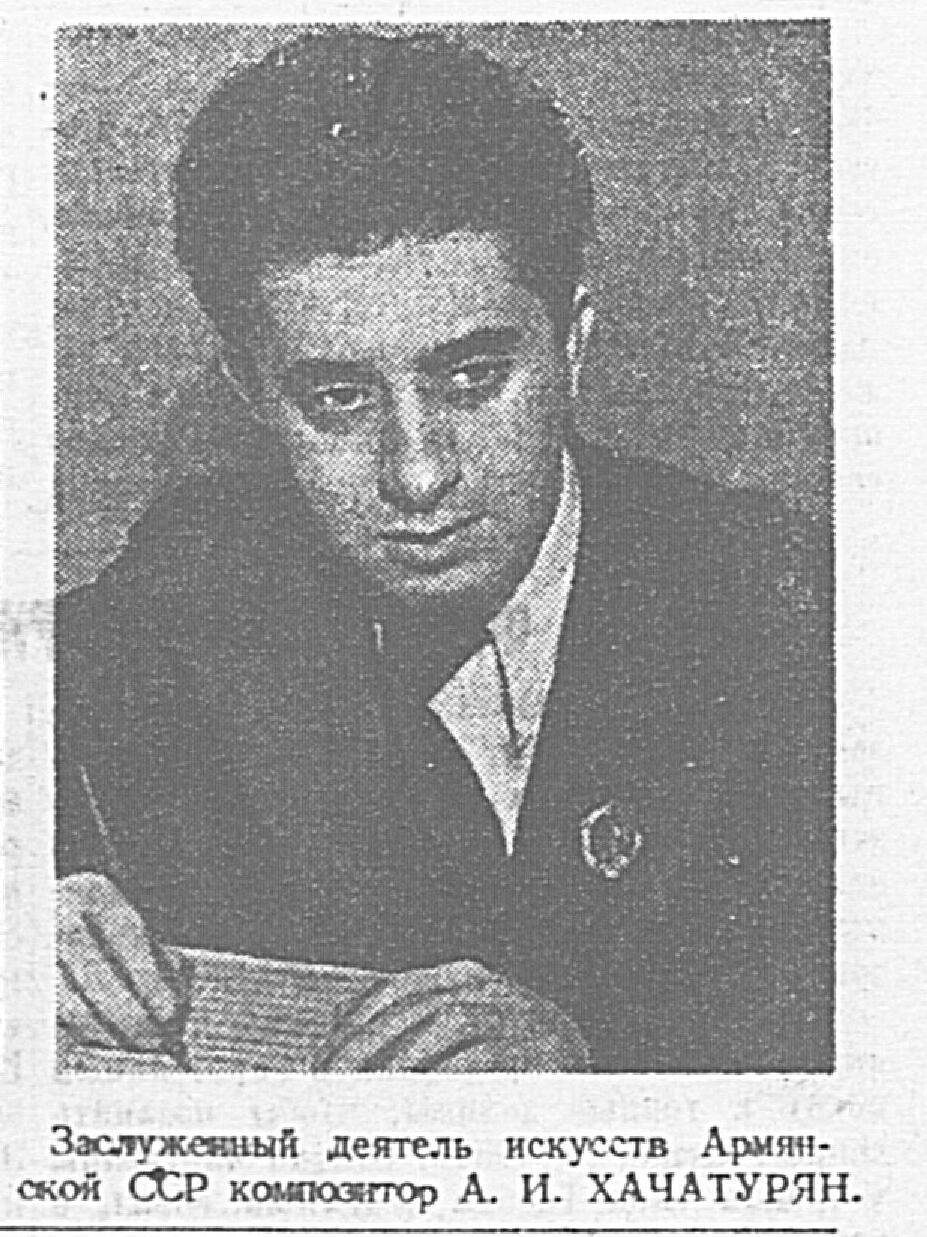
Khachaturian in 1943

Originally entitled The Dance of the Kurds, Khachaturian wrote "Sabre Dance" after completing the score of Gayane. He did so at the request of the Kirov Theatre, during its World War II evacuation to Perm (then called Molotov). He later recounted that the composition "came into being quite by accident". The director's request for one more dance led the composer to create a contrasting warlike and lyrical piece in just eleven hours, which was then orchestrated, staged, and rehearsed within two days. He wrote in November 1942 that it "immediately impressed" the orchestra, the dancers, and the audience during a full dress rehearsal. Khachaturian initially wanted to end it in a long and gradual diminuendo, but Nina Anisimova and the dancers persuaded him to end it with a gradual crescendo.

Several sources of inspiration have been proposed. Soviet musicologist Georgi Tigranov suggested that the piece embodies the "manly and heroic" essence of male Armenian folk dances and "the fiery temperament [and] raw energy" of "the warlike dances of the Transcaucasian peoples." Pianist Mariam Kharatyan argues that while "Sabre Dance" is neither inspired by, nor musically related to, the male martial dance Zinapar from Msho Shoror, a suite transcribed by Komitas, it reflects traits of that folk tradition through Khachaturian's individual style. Critics also have pointed to Russian orientalist precedents. Yuri Slonimsky compared it to the "Polovtsian Dances" from Borodin's Prince Igor (1890) and Balakirev's Islamey (1869). Tigranov and Victor Yuzefovich likewise cited the "Polovtsian Dances" as a prototype for its energy and "emotional frenzy". Steven J. Haller suggested influence from a "Sword Dance" in the 1927 Reinhold Glière ballet entitled The Red Poppy.

== Composition ==
"Sabre Dance" is a fast-paced (marked Presto) orchestral work lasting approximately two and a half to three minutes. It follows an ABA form with a transition and coda. The opening section presents the main theme. The middle section features woodwind instruments accompanied by timpani drums. The transition features repeated patterns on the xylophone and dramatic glissandos on the trombones. When the initial theme returns, it is interrupted by a cymbal crash, and then played at an even higher pitch. The work concludes with a descending melodic line followed by an upward climb to the final note.

The orchestration employs an array of percussion instruments, including the tambourine, snare drum, and particularly the xylophone, to emphasize the dance rhythms characteristic of folk music. The score calls for several specialized woodwind instruments, including piccolo, English horn, and bass clarinet. The harp plays throughout most of the piece, while the celesta appears only in the final three measures.

The brief slower section incorporates Armenian folk music and features a cello solo and alto saxophone. The saxophone, along with violins, violas, and cellos, presents a lyrical melody, enhanced by gentle flute counter-melodies based on a melodic motif from "Kalosi prken", a folk dance for men from the Shirak region. (Note: This marks the third leitmotif use of the folk song in the ballet, which also appears in the Dance of the Carpet Weavers and the duet of Armen and Aysha.) Tigranov suggests that the saxophone evokes the distinctive sound of traditional instruments such as the duduk and the zurna, while Tigran Mansurian suggests that its idiom "seems to come straight from the America".

The ending creates musical tension by combining different musical scales and keys simultaneously. The work features elements of polyrhythm, with duple and triple meters overlapping in different instrumental voices. Pedal points and bass ostinatos heighten the dramatic tension and dynamic intensity.

== Reception and legacy ==
Jay Nordlinger described "Sabre Dance" as "one of the most famous pieces of music", while NPR's Tom Huizenga called it "one of the catchiest, most familiar—perhaps most maddening—tunes to come out of the 20th century". Armenia's 2012 nomination of Khachaturian's manuscripts for the UNESCO Memory of the World Programme described "Sabre Dance" as one of the "most popular compositions of our age". Filmmaker Yusup Razykov, who directed a 2019 film about the creation of the piece, dubbed it as "a kind of ringtone of the 20th century". Sportswriter Bob Ryan called it "one of the great uplifting pieces of music ever written". The piece is considered a children's favorite. (Note: In a 2009 Classic FM poll, young listeners in Britain ranked it 20th among their preferred orchestral works.) Jonathan McCollum and Andy Nercessian wrote that "Sabre Dance" (and Gayane in general), along with Khachaturian's other ballet, Spartacus, are "perhaps the only works through which the world really knows Armenian music".

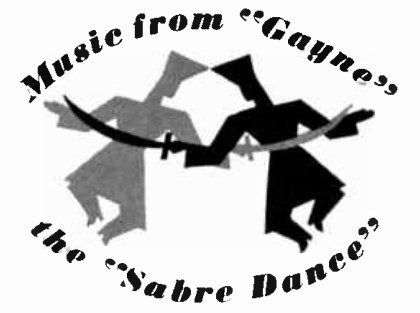
A 1948 promo insert by RCA Victor

The piece, which is his most recognizable, earned Khachaturian a worldwide reputation and continues to define his legacy. (Note: Some have called it his "one enduring hit" and Khachaturian a one-hit wonder.) He sometimes has been called "Mr. Sabre Dance", which he found annoying and unfair. Khachaturian maintained mixed feelings about the piece. While happy with its Western popularity, Khachaturian wished for more attention to his other works. In 1963, he called it "one unruly and rowdy child in my musical family", adding, "Honestly, if I had known it would gain such popularity and start elbowing aside my other works, I would never have written it!" He felt other melodies in Gayane deserved equal attention, and told an American interviewer, "It's like one button on my shirt, and I have many buttons." When asked about its popularity by American television representatives in Moscow, he jokingly responded, "Serves you right!" Composer Nikolai Kapustin recalled that Khachaturian was particularly irritated by the casual, whistling performances of the piece, once humorously mimicking such renditions for his close friends.

Noted for its explosive energy and relentless pace, (Note: "flashing", "furiously paced", "bustling", "rousing".) "Sabre Dance" was promoted by RCA Victor in 1948 as a "vivid, rampant, passionate orchestral tour de force". Early American critics found the piece "bold and spirited", conveying a "violent savagery of emotion". The New Record called it "the sort of piece that catches on quickly" and while not profound, "it is certainly pleasing and just the sort of music that will appeal to a wide audience". Michael Dervan found it catchy and rhythmically insistent, while David Schwartz described it as "raucous, silly, and altogether enjoyable." Rob Barnett likened it to a roller-coaster ride of escapism. George Loomis suggested it captures Khachaturian's essential qualities: "brash, optimistic, rhythmic, colourful, and above all accessible". Edward Greenfield opined that while "Sabre Dance" may be the most striking of the Gayane dances, "it is far from being the best".

Others have been more critical. Steven J. Haller dismissed it as "a blistering, tub-thumping excess". During Khachaturian's 1968 U.S. tour, Time magazine described the piece as a "tuneless orchestral blooey". Peter G. Davis and Martin Bernheimer called it "infamous" and "obnoxious". Pianist Sviatoslav Richter called it his most hated piece and "a work that stinks to high heaven".

== Recordings, arrangements, and covers ==
=== Orchestral recordings ===
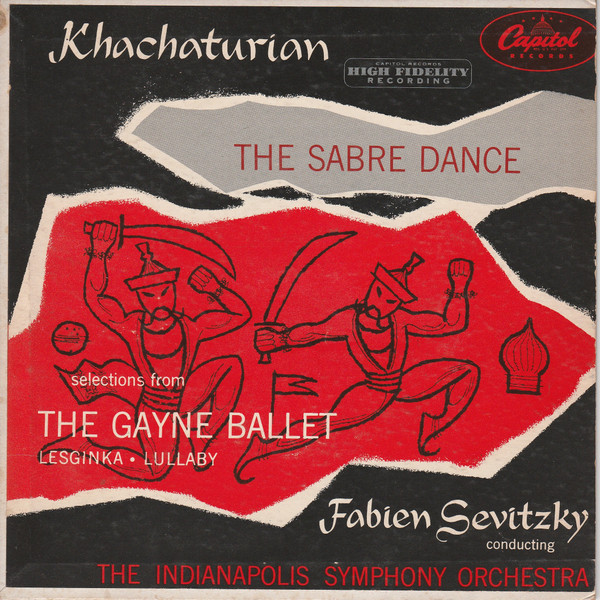
The cover of a 1953 vinyl record of "Sabre Dance" by the Indianapolis Symphony Orchestra

In 1943, Khachaturian arranged three orchestral suites from the ballet Gayane, with "Sabre Dance" included in Suite No. 3, published in the Soviet Union in 1947 by Muzgiz (State Music Publishing House) and in the West by Schirmer and Le Chant du Monde. By 1948, Leeds Music Corporation in the U.S. offered eleven different transcriptions and arrangements of the piece.

"Sabre Dance" received its American premiere during the 1944–45 season with Efrem Kurtz conducting the Kansas City Philharmonic; the performance was recorded live on a lacquer disc and broadcast on local radio in November 1944. After World War II, the work rapidly became a popular classical sensation in the West.

At its New York Philharmonic premiere in June 1946 at Lewisohn Stadium, conductor Alexander Smallens encored "Sabre Dance" following prolonged applause. In 1948, it reached No. 11 on the U.S. best-selling sheet music charts, No. 9 in Canada, and No. 14 in England. That same year, major American orchestras, namely the Chicago Symphony Orchestra conducted by Artur Rodziński and the New York Philharmonic conducted by Kurtz recorded the piece. Both topped Billboard's classical charts and became top-selling classical releases of 1948, with the Chicago Symphony's version becoming the ensemble's first million-seller. The piece was concurrently recorded by the "semi-classical" studio orchestras led by Victor Young, Ray Bloch, and Harry Horlick, among others.

"Sabre Dance" was recorded frequently in the 1950s, most notably by the Indianapolis Symphony Orchestra conducted by Fabien Sevitzky, Hollywood Bowl Symphony Orchestra (Felix Slatkin), Boston Pops Orchestra (Arthur Fiedler), and London Symphony Orchestra (Anatole Fistoulari). As conductor, Khachaturian recorded the piece with the Philharmonia Orchestra (1954), Vienna Philharmonic (1962), and the London Symphony Orchestra (1977). Other significant recordings include by the Philadelphia Orchestra conducted by Eugene Ormandy in 1967 and a video recording by the Berlin Philharmonic conducted by Simon Rattle in 2013.

=== Instrumental arrangements ===
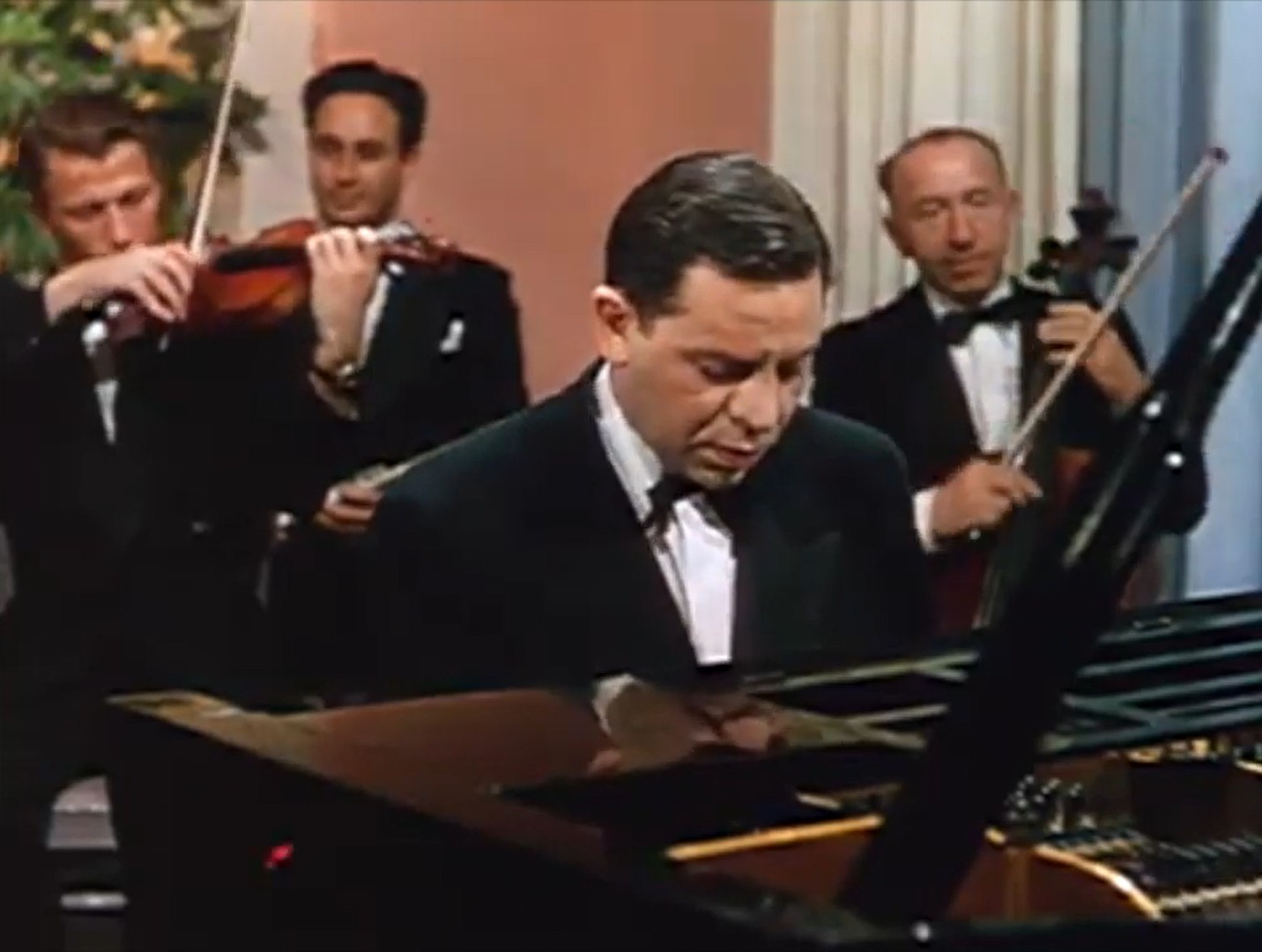
Oscar Levant (pictured here playing the piece in The Barkleys of Broadway) helped popularize "Sabre Dance" in the United States.

Oscar Levant arranged a piano solo version, releasing it on Columbia Records in 1948. It reached No. 6 on the year's classical chart. He performed it frequently on the radio program Kraft Music Hall starting from December 1947 and in the 1949 film The Barkleys of Broadway, described as "a brazen bit of cross-marketing" that let audiences see him play. The New Record wrote that Levant played it "with fine showmanship", with Current Biography Yearbook suggesting that it was Levant's rendition that "received popular attention". Benno Moiseiwitsch recorded Levant's transcription in 1948, while György Cziffra's version, recorded with the Hungarian Radio in 1954, has been called a "madcap overhauling" and a "marvel of pianistic aplomb". Liberace frequently performed it in his early-1950s television and concert appearances.

Violinist Jascha Heifetz created a technically demanding transcription for violin and piano in 1948, which has been called a "brilliant trifle" and "positively over-the-top". Violinist Vanessa-Mae covered a techno-flavoured version by Tolga Kashif in her 2004 album Choreography, which has been well received. The piece has inspired multiple accordion and harmonica arrangements, most notably by Mogens Ellegaard (1959) and Larry Adler (1978), respectively. James Galway adapted it for flute, recording it alongside other Khachaturian works with the Royal Philharmonic in 1985. It has been arranged for several folk instruments. These include a bongo version featuring Jack Costanzo in Pete Rugolo's 1955 album Rugolomania, a balalaika version by Mikhail Rozhkov, which appeared in the 1969 Soviet film Moskva v notakh, and an arrangement for Armenian instruments shvi and duduk by Ruben Altunyan (1999).

=== Popular music covers ===
"There's a rash of sabre dance disks based on the familiar excerpts from Aram Khachaturian's Gay[a]ne Ballet Suite."

— Billboard, February 1948

In 1948—dubbed the "Khachaturian Year" by Newsweek—"Sabre Dance" became a jukebox sensation in the United States. As the U.S. and the Soviet Union had no reciprocal copyright treaty, the piece was effectively in the public domain and became subject to "elegant plagiarism." Contemporary audiences embraced it as a novelty, and the recording industry (Tin Pan Alley) produced multiple competing versions. Its popularity in the U.S. coincided with the Soviet denunciation of Khachaturian (along with Shostakovich and Prokofiev).

Collectively, various recordings spent 23 weeks on the top 40 of the Cash Box Disc-Hits Box Score, peaking No. 1 in May 1948. Three versions charted on Billboard's Most-Played Juke Box Records: Woody Herman's dance-band foxtrot (arranged by Ralph Burns) reached No. 6, Freddy Martin's instrumental "Sabre Dance Boogie" hit No. 7, (Note: Herman's version also reached No. 3 on disk jockey playlists (Martin's at No. 7), while in sales Martin reached No. 6 and Herman No. 7. Herman's ultimately proved most enduring, ranking No. 7 among the year's top bands on disk jockey shows.) and The Andrews Sisters' vocal rendition (lyrics by Allan Roberts and Lester Lee) with harmonica accompaniment landed at No. 20. Billboard called Martin's version "the most commercial," while Herman's was deemed more authentic. Described as ravishing, the Andrews Sisters' version was considered extremely challenging to perform vocally, singing at seven syllables a second. It was, however, released "a little too late to cash in on the Khatchaturian bonanza".

Welsh guitarist Dave Edmunds' band Love Sculpture released a frenzied blues/psychedelic guitar, bass and drums instrumental version in November 1968 that propelled them to fame. (Note: Before the release, they had played it on the BBC Radio programme Top Gear. Besides the single, it was also released on the 1969 album Forms and Feelings.) Within a month, it sold over 15,000 copies, reached No. 5 in the UK chart, and charted in Switzerland, the Netherlands, and West Germany. The piece became Edmunds' "official guitar showcase piece." Critic Neville Garden called it "a successful adaptation in pop terms." Pete Prown and HP Newquist called it "raucous but untraditional," while Motörhead's Lemmy called it "the fastest thing you've ever heard in your fucking life!" Edmunds later called it "the most unlikely hit record", admitting he did not know why he chose it. He rerecorded an updated version for his 1994 album Plugged In, feeling the original was poorly done.

A number of rock versions have subsequently been released. The Dutch band Ekseption's 1969 recording has been well received. British folk metal band Skyclad's 1996 album Irrational Anthems includes an acclaimed version. Tony Levin offered a progressive rock version in his 2006 album Resonator to mixed reviews. Brian Setzer's orchestra recorded a version based on Edmunds' arrangement in their 2007 album Wolfgang's Big Night Out.

== Usage in popular culture ==
=== On screen ===
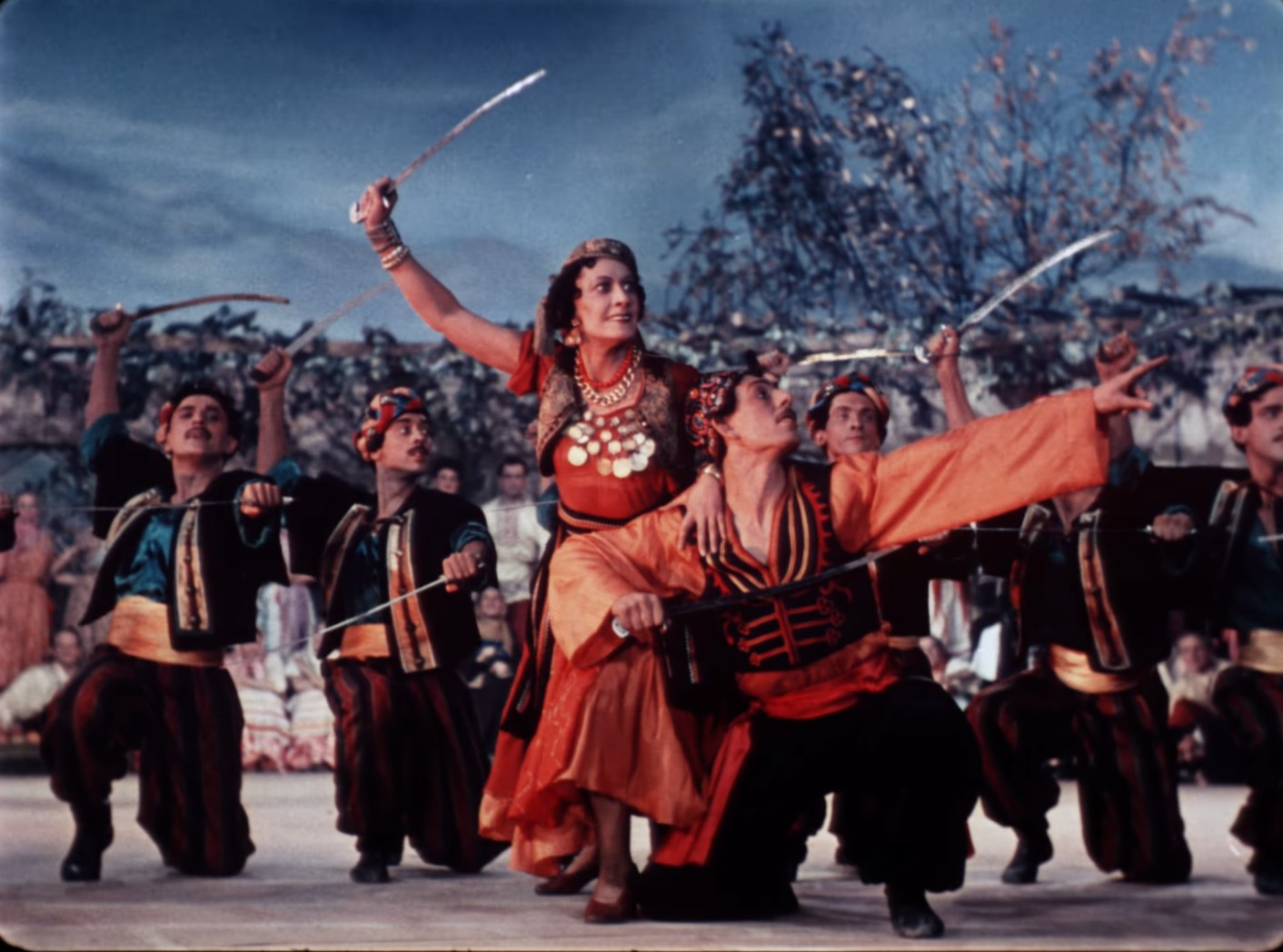
Still from the 1952 Soviet film-concert with the dancers in the final pose of "Sabre Dance"

The piece was featured in the 1952 Soviet film Concert of Stars (Концерт мастеров искусств), directed by Aleksandr Ivanovsky and Herbert Rappaport. The performance, with choreography by Nina Anisimova, was by the Kirov (Mariinsky) Ballet. Howard Thompson wrote that "Sabre Dance", with its "electric and supposedly definitive interpretation", is a highlight of the film.

The piece has permeated global pop culture and become universal shorthand for comedic urgency, appearing as a staple in plate-spinning acts, magic shows, and other theatrical performances. The piece's popular familiarity has been enhanced by its traditional use as accompaniment by circuses and on television variety shows, most notably The Ed Sullivan Show when plate spinners appeared. In the Soviet Union, it was popularized with an episode of the animated short Nu, pogodi! (1973).

"Sabre Dance" has featured in many feature films. (Note: Those mentioned by secondary sources include Animals Are Beautiful People (1974), Tarzoon: Shame of the Jungle (1975), Jumpin' Jack Flash (1986), Hocus Pocus (1993), Blues Brothers 2000 (1998), Kung Fu Hustle (2005), All About My Dog (2005), Scoop (2006), Ghost Town (2008), Le Concert (2009).) Adapted by André Previn, it is regularly employed to amplify comic effect in Billy Wilder's One, Two, Three (1961). In Tengiz Abuladze's Repentance (1987), it is used to inject tension at a key moment. In The Hudsucker Proxy (1994), the Coen brothers use it to underscore a rapid montage of the development of the hula hoop. In Federico Fellini's 8½ (1963) the piece is adapted by Nino Rota as a recurring lighthearted motif, and a parody, also by Rota, appears in Amarcord (1973). The main theme in Tim Burton's Pee-wee's Big Adventure (1985), reminiscent of "Sabre Dance", is used to convey whimsical chaos and comic exuberance. In "A Piano in the House", a 1962 episode of The Twilight Zone, it functions as a musical trigger, while in The Amazing Race 28 (2016), it appears in an episode filmed in Armenia.

=== In sports ===
The piece has also been used prominently in sports. The National Hockey League (NHL) team Buffalo Sabres have used the piece as a intro/skate-in song since the team was established in 1970. Sportswriter Bob Ryan found it to be "the greatest piece of intro music in sport." After a hiatus, "Sabre Dance" was officially brought back in 2011, specifically using Vanessa-Mae's version.

"Sabre Dance" has been a recurring choice for figure skating programs, performed by competitors from numerous countries in both national and international events. Among the most prominent skaters who have performed to the piece are Toller Cranston, Scott Hamilton, Michelle Kwan, Johnny Weir, and Evgeni Plushenko. The piece has also been used in women's-only synchronized swimming and rhythmic gymnastics.

A snippet of "Sabre Dance" was featured in the 2014 Winter Olympics opening ceremony held in Fisht Olympic Stadium, Sochi, Russia, on February 7. Between 2010 and 2013, "Sabre Dance" was played at Donbas Arena, the venue of the Ukrainian football club Shakhtar in Donetsk, whenever the Armenian player Henrikh Mkhitaryan scored a goal.
