= Gayane (ballet) =

Ballet by Aram Khachaturian

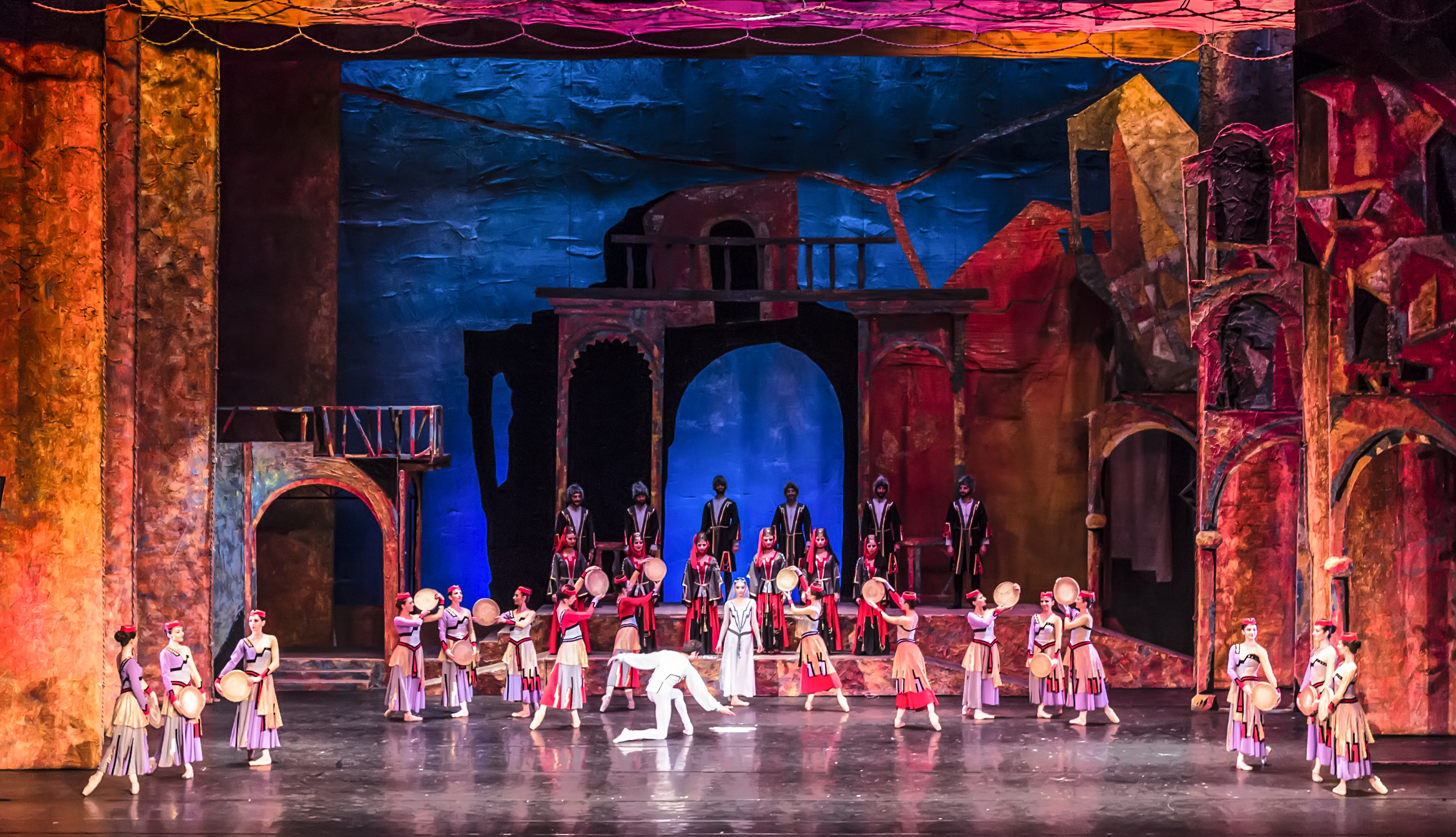
- Choreographer: Nina Aleksandrovna Anisimova
- Music: Aram Khachaturian
- Premiere: 9 December 1942; Perm, Russian SFSR, USSR
- Original ballet company: Kirov Ballet
- Characters: Gayane; Karen; Armen; Nune; Giko
- Genre: Classical ballet
- Type: Soviet "folk" ballet

Gayane (Gayaneh or Gayne, the e is pronounced; Armenian: Գայանե; Russian: Гаянэ) is a four-act ballet with music by Aram Khachaturian. The ballet was originally composed in or before 1939, when it was first produced in Yerevan as Happiness. It was revised in 1941–42 to a libretto by Konstantin Derzhavin and with choreography by Nina Aleksandrovna Anisimova (Derzhavin's wife), and the score was revised again in 1952 and in 1957, with a new plot. The stage design was by Nathan Altman (scenery) and Tatyana Bruni (costumes).

The first performance took place on 9 December 1942, staged by the Kirov Ballet while in Perm, Russia, during the Second World War evacuation, and was broadcast on the radio. The principal dancers were Natalia Dudinskaya (Gayane), Nikolai Zubkovsky (Karen), Konstantin Sergeyev (Armen), Tatanya Vecheslova (Nune), and Boris Shavrov (Giko). The conductor was Pavel Feldt. The best-known part of the ballet is the "Sabre Dance", which has been performed by many artists, including pop musicians.

Khachaturian's original Gayane was the story of a young Armenian woman whose patriotic convictions conflict with her personal feelings on discovering her husband's treason. In later years the plot was modified several times, the resultant story emphasizing romance over nationalistic zeal.

== Background ==
Gayane was based on an earlier ballet composed by Khachaturian called Happiness, which he developed in 1939 at the suggestion of Anastas Mikoyan, based on a libretto by Gevorg Hovhannisyan. The composer devised the new ballet when the Kirov ballet was in Perm. He started composing the score in autumn 1941, and the ballet was first mounted on 3 December 1942 on the small stage of the Perm state theatre. Despite these limitations, the production showed that the company was continuing to exist and to produce new ballets during the war. Anisimova invited dancers who happened to be in the city at the time to participate in her ballet; there was a sense of camaraderie and combined effort which suited the positive feeling of the ballet itself.

== Instrumentation ==
The orchestral score calls for:

- woodwinds: 3 flutes (3rd doubling piccolo), 2 oboes, English horn, 3 clarinets (3rd doubling bass clarinet), alto saxophone, 2 bassoons;
- Brass: 4 horns, cornet, 3 trumpets, alto trumpet, 3 trombones, bass tuba;
- Timpani and percussion: triangle, tambourine, 2 side drums, cymbals, bass drum, tam-tam, doli, daira, Glockenspiel, xylophone, marimba, vibraphone, chimes;
- keyboards: celesta, piano;
- strings: 2 harps, violins (1st and 2nd), violas, cellos and double basses.

== Plot ==
Many themes of interethnic love, betrayal and friendship interact in an Armenian setting. The central character is a young woman named Gayane, who works in a kolkhoz in a mountainous district near the national border.

Act I

In the Armenian kolkhoz, farmers are reaping cotton. Among them are the heroine Gayane, her father Hovhannes, her brother Armen and her younger sister Nune. All are models of hard work, with the sole exception of Gayane's husband Giko, a lazy drunkard. She admonishes Giko for his misconduct, and this escalates into a quarrel. Kazakov, commander of the Soviet frontier guard, then arrives, and a dance of welcome begins. Seeing Gayane present a bouquet to Kazakov, Giko violently snatches the bouquet from her and, ignoring everybody's reproach, disappears.

Act II

At Gayane's home, people console Gayane, who is deploring her husband's misconduct. The singing voices of carpet weavers are heard. As Giko returns, all go out. Gayane sings her child Ripsime to sleep. Three smugglers come to see Giko. They conspire to share the public money they have embezzled, to set fire to the cotton warehouse and to flee abroad. Overhearing their conspiracy, Gayane admonishes her husband, but he thrusts her into another room and locks her up.

Act III

Many people are gathered at a Kurdish settlement in a mountainous area near the kolkhoz, including Gayane's brother Armen, a Kurdish girl, Aishe, and a young Kurdish man, Izmail, who loves her. Giko and the three smugglers arrive, asking Armen for directions. Wondering about their intentions and activity, he sends some Kurdish youths to fetch Kazakov. Noticing this, Giko and his gang try to kill Armen, but Kazakov appears just in time and arrests the three smugglers. Giko escapes, however, and sets fire to the cotton warehouse. Trying to flee in the confusion of the moment, Giko is found by Gayane, who has managed to break out of the room in which she was imprisoned. Giko threatens to drop their child Ripsime from a cliff. When Gayane does not yield, Giko stabs her with a dagger. Hearing her shriek, Kazakov rushes in and arrests Giko, who will be brought to justice. Kazakov tends Gayane devotedly, and she recovers. Love grows between the two.

Act IV

A year later, at the kolkhoz, a dedication ceremony of the reconstructed warehouse occurs, as well as three weddings: Gayane and Kazakov, Armen and Aishe, Karen and Nune. Folk dances, rich in local color, are performed one after another. The ballet ends amid blessings by all.

== Analysis ==
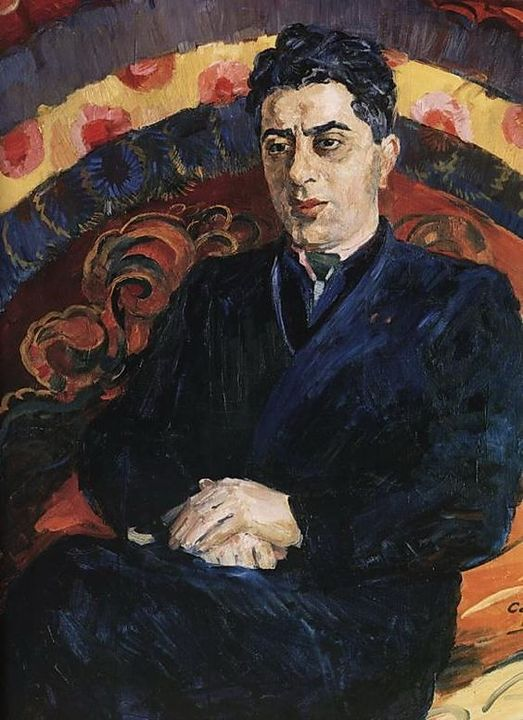
Portrait of Aram Khachaturian, 1944

The ballet Gayane was modestly successful when danced before Joseph Stalin; performances outside the USSR have been infrequent. At the time, it was understood that the simple libretto was a necessary backdrop for the dancing, which was staged and choreographed by Anisimova, who danced in the original production. Choreographically, Anisimova thought in character dancing terms, although she also had extensive knowledge of classical dance.

Excerpts from Gayane are performed by dance companies and dance schools, especially the wedding in the second act, with its duets and variations for Gayane and her lover Kazakov. The choreography was unusual for its time—classical and folk dance combined—especially the stylized use of arms and hands from the folkloric Armenian culture that is the ballet's background.

The collective farm's ethnic diversity is the backdrop for each part of the music (adagio arrangements, Armenian and Caucasian tunes) and for the tale of love between a couple from different social classes.

The premiere cast included Natalia Dudinskaya and Konstantin Sergeyev, then leading figures in Leningrad ballet. Nina Anisimova danced the part of an Armenian girl who is an image and symbol of socialist labour: she works hard, she knows how to produce the most from the fields, but she also knows how to enjoy life, spending her free time dancing and laughing.

The suite of dances in the second act reflects the nationalities of the Soviet Union. At the time, Armenia was one of 15 republics within the Union. For this suite, Anisimova created the "Sabre Dance", which, when performed as a musical extract, became a showpiece for many dance companies.

The style of movement in the dance is unusual and unexpected for character dance: it features unusual bends of the body and inventive positions of the arms that are not drawn from classical moves, and the overall structure of the body is not balletic. Above all, in keeping with Khachaturian's music, the choreography is temperamental.

Critics have judged that, in strict ballet terms, Gayane is not completely successful as a whole, because of its naïve libretto and its overtly social emphasis. Nevertheless, choreographers, critics, and historians persuaded the Kirov Theatre to profitably stage excerpts of the ballet.

The "Variation of Gayane", the "Variation of Giko", and the character dances were successful and were subsequently danced as gala pieces. After the premiere in Perm, Anisimova twice restaged Gayane for the Kirov; the revised 1952 version stands as the definitive version of the ballet.

Anisimova's work demonstrated that character dancing could be included in the world of classical ballet. The dance in Gayane did not follow the Petipa tradition, exemplified by Swan Lake, in which national dances are presented in discrete divertissements ( "dances of le salon", in Petipa's words); instead, character dance in Gayane is present throughout the ballet as a natural part of the people and of their history. In time, the ballet helped choreographers understand the importance of choreographic art in Russia, combining character dance with classical and mime traditions. Gayane is an example of character dance and ballet combined, and is considered significant in twentieth-century Soviet choreography.

== Derivative works ==
- Suite from Gayane No. 1 (1943)
- Suite from Gayane No. 2 (1943)
- Suite from Gayane No. 3 (1943)

For concert performance Khachaturian arranged three orchestral suites drawn from the score. Published in 1943, these became popular. The suites exist in various configurations, and conductors often compile their own selection for any given performance.

Stanley Kubrick's film 2001: A Space Odyssey featured one of the slower sections of the Gayane third suite (the Adagio). The composer James Horner quoted from this same piece in three of his film scores, Patriot Games, Clear and Present Danger and Aliens. The "Adagio" was also used, among other pieces by Khachaturian, in Tinto Brass's Caligula.

The "Sabre Dance" features prominently in the 1961 film One, Two, Three directed by Billy Wilder and starring James Cagney, as well as in Woody Allen's 2006 film Scoop. It has also been used in numerous other films, television shows, and video games. Because of its feverish tempo, the music has long been a staple of novelty acts such as plate twirling. It is also used as the introductory and promotional theme for the professional hockey team the Buffalo Sabres.

== See also ==
- Vanoush Khanamirian

== Bibliography ==
- Shakarian, Pietro A. (2025). Anastas Mikoyan: An Armenian Reformer in Khrushchev's Kremlin. Bloomington: Indiana University Press. ISBN 978-0253073556.
- Shneerson, Grigory (1959). Aram Khachaturyan. Moscow: Foreign Languages Publishing House.
- Yuzefovich, Victor A. (1985). Aram Khachaturyan. Translated by Nicholas Kournokoff; Vladimir Bobrov. New York: Sphinx Press. ISBN 0-8236-8658-2.
