= Die Csárdásfürstin =

Operetta by Emmerich Kálmán

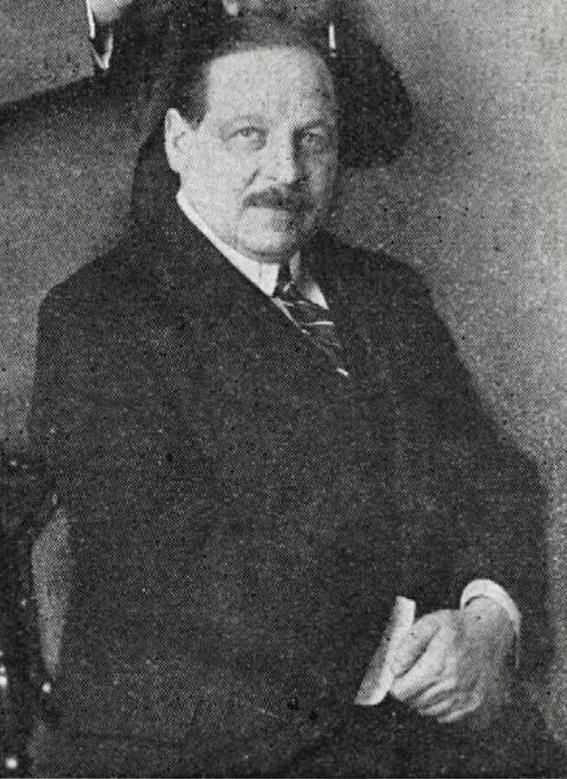
Emmerich Kálmán

Die Csárdásfürstin (German pronunciation: [diː ˈtʃaʁdaʃ-] or [ˈtʃaʁdas.fʏʁstɪn]; The Csárdás Princess; translated into English as The Riviera Girl and The Gipsy Princess) is an operetta in three acts by Hungarian composer Emmerich Kálmán, with libretto by Leo Stein and Bela Jenbach. It premiered in Vienna at the Johann Strauss Theater on 17 November 1915. Numerous film versions and recordings have been made. The operetta is widely beloved across Europe, particularly in Hungary, Austria, Germany, and the former Soviet Union, where it was adapted into a popular film. It is arguably Kálmán's most successful work.

== Roles ==
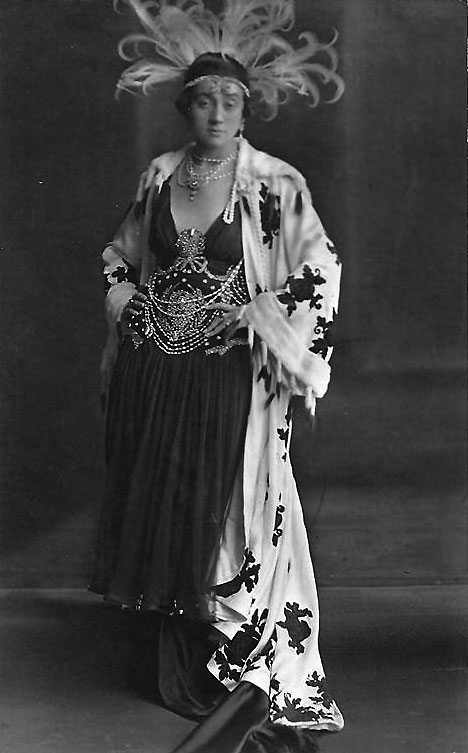
Naima Wifstrand as Countess Stasi, 1916

Roles, voice type, premiere cast
Role	Voice type	Premiere cast, 17 November 1915 Conductor: Artur Guttmann
Sylva Varescu	soprano	Mizzi Günther
Edwin Ronald	tenor/baritone	Karl Bachmann
Countess Stasi	soprano	Susanne Bachrich
Count Boni Káncsiánu	tenor	Josef König
Feri von Kerekes	bass	Antal Nyárai
Anhilte	contralto	Gusti Macha
Leopold Maria	bass	
Oberleutnant von Rohnsdorff	bass	
An American	bass	

== Synopsis ==
Place: Budapest and Vienna
Time: shortly before the outbreak of the First World War

=== Act 1 ===
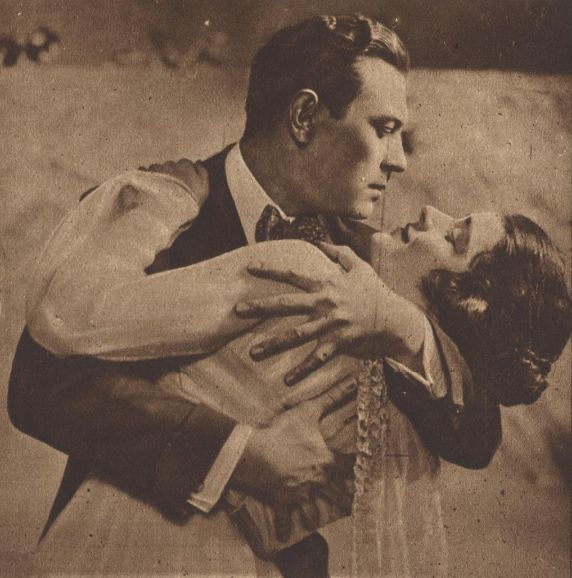
Carl Gantvoort and Wilda Bennett in a 1917 production of The Riviera Girl

Sylva Varescu, a self-sufficient and professionally successful cabaret performer from Budapest, is about to embark on a tour of America. Three of her aristocratic admirers, named Edwin, Feri, and Boni, prefer her to stay. Edwin, unaware that his parents have already arranged a marriage for him back home in Vienna, orders a notary to prepare a promissory note of his expected marriage to Sylva within ten weeks. Sylva then leaves on her American tour, and Edwin leaves for peacetime military duty.

=== Act 2 ===
Just at the time this promissory note is about to expire, Sylva visits Edwin's palace in Vienna, pretending to have married Boni as her entrée into his family's society. Edwin is about to be engaged to Stasi, who does not care for him and wishes only an arranged marriage. Boni falls in love with Stasi and Edwin regrets not keeping his promise to Sylva sooner. However, Edwin makes the faux pas of informing Sylva that his parents would accept Sylva only if she pretends to have been divorced from Boni and therefore already entered society via an earlier marriage. Edwin's father separately informs Sylva that if she marries Edwin without first having achieved noble rank through some other route, her role in society could be merely that of a "csárdás princess." Sylva realizes that she is better than they and has a brighter future than they have. She purposefully embarrasses Edwin and his father, turning her back on them and leaving in the presence of their assembled friends.

=== Act 3 ===
The act is set in a Viennese hotel to which Feri has accompanied the cabaret troupe from Budapest, who are about to sail on another American tour with Sylva. As everyone shows up and recognizes each other, Feri recognizes Edwin's mother as a retired cabaret singer from Budapest whose star once shone prior to Sylva's time. Edwin's mother joins the two couples, Sylva/Edwin and Boni/Stasi, all unwittingly heading to safety on this American tour.

== Recordings ==
Key: Conductor / Stasi / Sylva / Boni / Edwin / Feri

- Samuil Samosud / Kazanskaya / Yakovenko / Ruban / Nelepp / Yakushev – 1956 – Melodiya
- Grund / Koller / Moffo / Németh / Kollo / Mensáros – 1971 – Szinetár movie – Deutsche Grammphon DVD
- Gunhard Mattes / Olivera Miljaković / Anneliese Rothenberger / Willi Brokmeier / Nicolai Gedda / Wolfgang Anheisser – 1971 – EMI
- Bibl / Kales / Rudiferia / Poppell / Franz Wächter / Németh – 1985 – live in Tokyo – Denon
- Bonynge / Hislop / Riedel / Lemke / Austin / Ewer – 1990 – Sydney – Opus Arte DVD
- Bibl / Grotrian / Schoenenberg / Werba / Bothmer / Harsányi – 2002 – Mörbisch – Videoland DVD
- Bibl / Grotrian / Serafin / Eröd / Bothmer / Harsányi – 2002 – Oehms
- Bonynge / Mojca Erdmann / Yvonne Kenny / Kathol / Roider / Ebner – 2002 – Naxos Records

== Film adaptations ==
It was made into a 1927 silent German film The Csardas Princess directed by Hanns Schwarz. In 1944 it was made into the Soviet operetta film Sylva directed by Aleksandr Ivanovsky. It was one of the most successful releases in the Soviet Union that year. Later, in 1981, it was made again into an even more successful Soviet operetta film under the same name, directed by Yan Frid.

- The Csardas Princess, directed by Emil Leyde (Germany, 1919)
- The Csardas Princess, directed by Hanns Schwarz (Germany/Hungary, 1927)
- The Csardas Princess, directed by Georg Jacoby (German, 1934)
  - Princesse Czardas, directed by Georg Jacoby and André Beucler (French, 1934)
- Sylva, directed by Aleksandr Ivanovsky (Soviet Union, 1944)
- The Csardas Princess, directed by Georg Jacoby (West Germany, 1951)
- The Csardas Princess, directed by Miklós Szinetár (West Germany/Hungary, 1971, TV film)
- Silva, directed by Yan Frid (Soviet Union, 1981)
