= Derzhavin =

Derzhavin (masculine, Russian: Державин) or Derzhavina (feminine, Russian: Державина) is a Russian surname. Notable people with the surname include:

- Gavrila Derzhavin (1743–1816), Russian poet and statesman
- Konstantin Derzhavin (1903–1956), Soviet and Russian translator, writer, and literary and theater critic
- Mikhail Derzhavin (1936–2018), Soviet and Russian actor

== See also ==
- 23409 Derzhavin, a minor planet
