= The Gentleman Without a Residence (1915 film) =

- Directed by: Fritz Freund
- Written by: Bela Jenbach (play); Rudolf Österreicher (play)
- Produced by: Erich Pommer
- Starring: Gustav Waldau; Julius Brandt; Paul Morgan
- Production company: Wiener Autorenfilm
- Release date: October 1915
- Country: Austria
- Languages: Silent; German intertitles

The Gentleman Without a Residence (German: Der Herr ohne Wohnung) is a 1915 Austrian silent film directed by Fritz Freund and starring Gustav Waldau, Julius Brandt, and Paul Morgan.

== Cast ==
- Gustav Waldau as the drunken Baron
- Julius Brandt as Einspänner
- Paul Morgan as Prof. Mandling
- Frl. Zeckendorf
- Alexander Herrnfeld

== See also ==
- The Gentleman Without a Residence (1925)
- The Gentleman Without a Residence (1934)
- Who's Your Lady Friend? (1937)

== Bibliography ==
- Bock, Hans-Michael & Bergfelder, Tim. The Concise CineGraph. Encyclopedia of German Cinema. Berghahn Books, 2009.
