= Die blaue Mazur =

Operetta by Franz Lehár

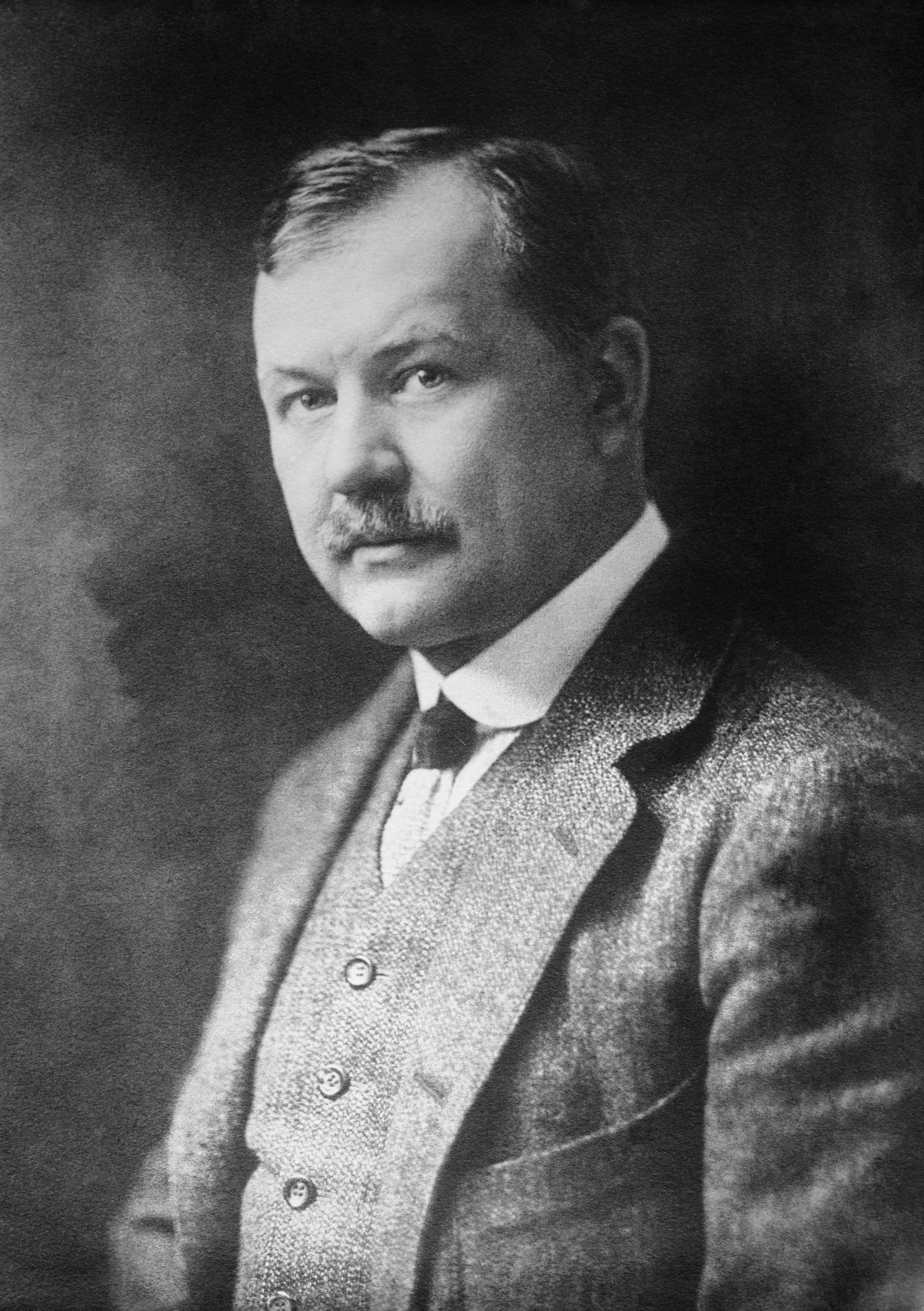
Franz Lehár, likely sometime between 1915 and 1920

Die Blaue Mazur (The Blue Mazurka) is an operetta by Franz Lehár. The libretto was written by Bela Jenbach and Leo Stein.

It was first performed in Vienna in 1920.

== Synopsis ==
The operetta takes place in Vienna and surroundings and deals with the initially unfortunate marriage of the Viennese Countess Blanka von Lossin with the Polish Count Olinski. Because of her husband's unfaithfulness, his wife leaves him and initially seeks her luck elsewhere. In the end, both spouses realize that they belong together.
