= Julius Brandt =

Austrian actor (1873–1949)

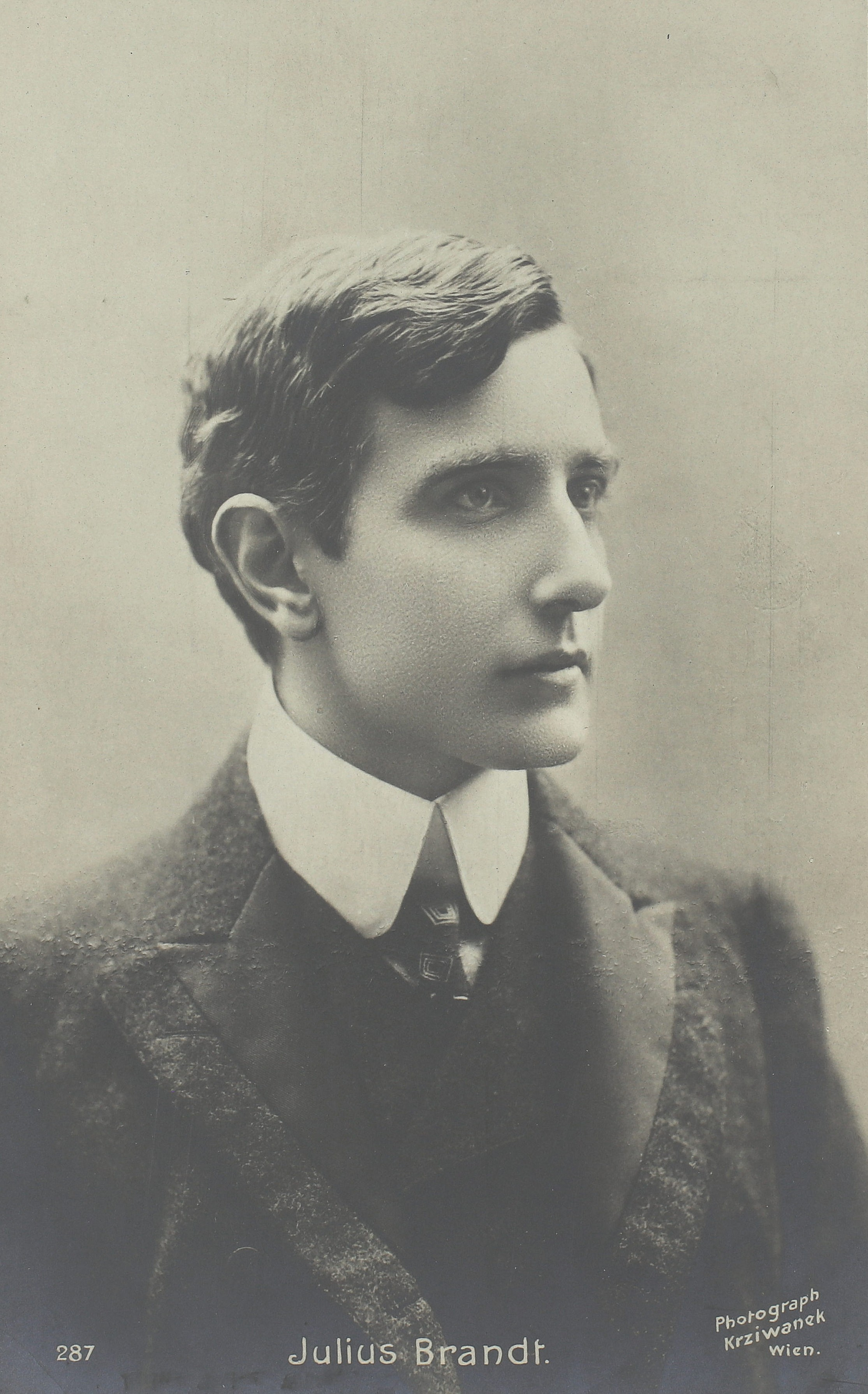
Brandt in 1901

Julius Brandt (5 March 1873 in Olomouc – 26 December 1949 in Vienna) was an Austrian stage and film actor, film director and screenwriter.

== Selected filmography ==
- The Gentleman Without a Residence (1915)
- Pogrom (1919)
- The Prisoner (1920)
- Diamonds (1920)
- Weib und Palette (1921)
- About the Son (1921)
- The Vulture Wally (1921)
- La Boheme (1923)
- The Ancient Law (1923)
- The Gentleman Without a Residence (1925)
- Die Geliebte des Gouverneurs (1927)
- The Weavers (1927)
- Behind the Altar (1927)
- Autumn on the Rhine (1928)
- Rustle of Spring (1929)
- Two Worlds (1930)
- The Virtuous Sinner (1931)
- Mary (1931)
- One Hour of Happiness (1931)
- My Wife, the Impostor (1931)
- Cruiser Emden (1932)
- The White Demon (1932)
- Grandstand for General Staff (1932)
- Three from the Unemployment Office (1932)
- The Gentleman from Maxim's (1933)
- The Young Baron Neuhaus (1934)
- Victoria in Dover (1936)
- The Night With the Emperor (1936)
- A Wedding Dream (1936)
- Such Great Foolishness (1937)
- Darling of the Sailors (1937)
- Comrades at Sea (1938)
- The Optimist (1938)
- The Scoundrel (1939)
- Immortal Waltz (1939)
- Falstaff in Vienna (1940)
- The Way to Freedom (1941)
- A Salzburg Comedy (1943)
- It's Only Love (1947)
- Lambert Feels Threatened (1949)
- Dear Friend (1949)
