= Hannsgeorg Laubenthal =

German actor

- Born: 12 June 1911; Cologne, Rhineland, German Empire
- Died: 13 July 1971 (aged 60); Steinbach, Hesse, West Germany
- Occupation: Actor
- Years active: 1937-1970 (film & TV)

Hannsgeorg Laubenthal (1911–1971) was a German stage actor, who also acted in film and television. In 1967 he was awarded the Hersfeld-Preis.

== Selected filmography ==
- Signal in the Night (1937)
- The Leghorn Hat (1939)
- Heart of Stone (1950)
- Der Untertan (1951)
- Final Accord (1960)

== Bibliography ==
- Fischer-Lichte, Erika. Tragedy's Endurance: Performances of Greek Tragedies and Cultural Identity in Germany Since 1800. Oxford University Press, 2017.
