= Comedienne (film) =

1923 soviet film

- Directed by: Aleksandr Ivanovsky
- Written by: Aleksandr Ivanovsky; Nikolai Leskov
- Cinematography: Nikolai Kozlovsky
- Production company: Sevzapkino
- Release date: 3 August 1923
- Country: Soviet Union
- Languages: Silent; Russian intertitles

Comedienne (Russian: Комедиантка, romanized: Komediantka) is a 1923 Soviet silent romantic drama directed by Aleksandr Ivanovsky.

The film's sets were designed by the art director Vladimir Ballyuzek.

== Cast ==
- Kondrat Yakovlev
- Pyotr Andriyevsky
- Nina Shaternikova as Lyuba
- Sergei Shishko
- Yelena Tumanskaya
- Yekaterina Korchagina-Aleksandrovskaya
- Aleksandr Panteleyev
- Aleksandr Novikov as Lakey
- Alexander Shiryaev as Skripochkin

== Bibliography ==
- Paul Babitsky & John Rimberg. The Soviet Film Industry. 1955.
