= Signal in the Night =

1937 film

- Directed by: Richard Schneider-Edenkoben
- Written by: Fred Hildenbrand; Richard Schneider-Edenkoben
- Based on: Die graue Schwester (play) by Paul Hensel-Haerdrich
- Produced by: Helmut Schreiber
- Starring: Sybille Schmitz; Inge List; Hannes Stelzer
- Cinematography: Karl Löb
- Music by: Rudolf Perak
- Production company: Meteor-Film
- Distributed by: Tobis Film; Tobis-Sascha Film (Austria)
- Release date: 1 October 1937
- Running time: 87 minutes
- Country: Germany
- Language: German

Signal in the Night (German: Signal in der Nacht) is a 1937 German war drama film directed by Richard Schneider-Edenkoben and starring Sybille Schmitz, Inge List and Hannes Stelzer. Location shooting took place at Grünwald Castle and around Bad Reichenhall in Bavaria.

== Synopsis ==
A young Austrian woman marries an Italian count without really being in love with him, while secretly being admired by an Austrian captain. Things are complicated by the outbreak of the First World War when the two countries become enemies.

== Cast ==
- Sybille Schmitz as Brigitte von Schachen
- Inge List as Nina Bernini
- Hannes Stelzer as Capitano Mario Bernini - ihr Bruder
- Curt Ackermann as Conte Cesare Bernini - beider Bruder
- Hannsgeorg Laubenthal as Hauptmann Franz von Auersperg
- Harald Paulsen as Pionierhauptmann Urban
- Julia Serda as Brigittes Tante
- Hans Leibelt as Schneblinger - Bursche von Auersberg
- Karel Stepanek as Korporal Tschepski
- Viktor Gehring as Zugführer Hirrlinger
- Ernst Waldow as Emmerich - Bursche von Urban
- Paul Bildt Professor Allmendinger
- Arnim Suessenguth as Oberst v. Eidam
- Otz Tollen as Oberleutnant Rickert
- Harry Hardt as Italienischer Korporal
- Max Vierlinger as Italienischer Sprengtrupp
- Helmut Hoffmann as Italienischer Sprengstrupp
- Helmut Heyne as Italienischer Sprengtrupp
- Edmund Pouch as Italienischer Sprengtrupp
- Norbert Kawczynski as Italienischer Sprengtrupp

== Bibliography ==
- Moeller, Felix. The Film Minister: Goebbels and the Cinema in the Third Reich. Axel Menges, 2000.
