= Nina Anisimova (dancer) =

Soviet dancer and choreographer

Nina Aleksandrovna Anisimova (Russian: Ни́на Алекса́ндровна Ани́симова; 14 January 1909, Saint Petersburg – 23 September 1979, Leningrad) was a Soviet dancer and choreographer.

== Biography ==
She studied at the Petrograd (later Leningrad) Ballet School with Maria Fedorovna Romanova, Alexander Shiryaev, and Agrippina Vaganova. In 1926 she graduated from the Maly Theatre of Opera and Ballet, then from 1927 to 1958 danced with GATOB (later Kirov Ballet). In 1932 she created the role of Thérèse in Vasili Vainonen's Flames of Paris, demonstrating her abilities as a character dancer.

In 1936 she choreographed her first major ballet, Andalusian Wedding (music by Emmanuel Chabrier) for the Leningrad Ballet School. Her subsequent works include Gayane (music by Aram Khachaturian, 1942) for the Kirov, Perm in which she danced the lead in the "Sabre Dance". She also choreographed Songs of the Crane (music by Stepanov and Ismagilov, 1944) for Bashkir Opera, The Magic Veil (music by Zaranek, 1947), and her own version of Scheherazade (music by Nikolai Rimsky-Korsakov, 1950), both for the Maly Theatre, Leningrad. In 1964 she staged Swan Lake for the Royal Danish Ballet.

In 1938 she was wrongly accused of spying for Nazi Germany and was arrested by the NKVD. While there was insufficient evidence to prove that she had done any sort of espionage, she was declared "socially dangerous" and sent via cattle wagon to the Karlag gulag in Kazakhstan. She was released in 1939 and resumed her ballet career.

Between 1963 and 1974 she taught at the choreographic department of the Leningrad Conservatory. She was married to the writer Konstantin Derzhavin.

== Notes and references ==
- Roslavleva, Natalia (1966). Era of the Russian Ballet. London: Gollancz.
- Craine, Debra; Mackrell, Judith, eds. (2010). "Nina Anisimova". The Oxford Dictionary of Dance. Oxford: Oxford University Press.
