= Inge List =

Austrian actress

- Born: 14 August 1916; Salzburg, Austro-Hungarian Empire
- Died: October 2003 (aged 87); United States
- Occupation: Actor
- Years active: 1933–1944 (film)

Inge List (1916–2003) was an Austrian stage and film actress.

== Selected filmography ==
- Grand Duchess Alexandra (1933)
- Princess Turandot (1934)
- The Csardas Princess (1934)
- Mazurka (1935)
- I Love All the Women (1935)
- The Emperor's Candlesticks (1936)
- A Wedding Dream (1936)
- Signal in the Night (1937)
- Thirteen Chairs (1938)
- Late Love (1943)

== Bibliography ==
- Von Dassanowsky, Robert. Screening Transcendence: Film Under Austrofascism and the Hollywood Hope, 1933-1938. Indiana University Press, 2018
