= Leo Stein (writer) =

Austrian playwright and librettist (1861-1921)

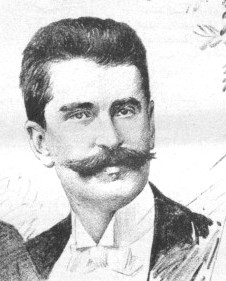
Leo Stein (1896)

Leo Stein, born Leo Rosenstein (25 March 1861, Lemberg – 28 July 1921, Vienna, Austria) was a playwright and librettist of operettas in the latter part of the 19th and early 20th centuries, including works adapted for a number of Broadway productions.

Stein wrote libretti for Johann Strauss Jr, Franz Lehár, Emmerich Kálmán, and Oskar Nedbal. His collaboration with Viktor Léon contributed much to Lehár's success.

A selection of his works includes Wiener Blut (1899), Die lustige Witwe (1905), Der Graf von Luxemburg (1909) and Die Csárdásfürstin (1915).

Stein is buried at the Vienna Zentralfriedhof.

== Filmography ==
- The Merry Widow, directed by Michael Curtiz (Hungary, 1918)
- The Csardas Princess, directed by Emil Leyde (Austria, 1919)
- The Merry Widow, directed by Erich von Stroheim (1925)
- The Count of Luxembourg, directed by Arthur Gregor (1926)
- The Sweet Girl, directed by Manfred Noa (Germany, 1926)
- Schützenliesel, directed by Rudolf Walther-Fein and Rudolf Dworsky (Germany, 1926)
- The Csardas Princess, directed by Hanns Schwarz (Germany, 1927)
- The Csardas Princess, directed by Georg Jacoby (Germany, 1934)
- The Merry Widow, directed by Ernst Lubitsch (1934)
- Kungen kommer, directed by Ragnar Hyltén-Cavallius (Sweden, 1936, based on Der Gauklerkönig)
- Vienna Blood, directed by Willi Forst (Germany, 1942)
- Silva, directed by Aleksandr Ivanovsky (Soviet Union, 1944, based on The Csardas Princess)
- The Csardas Princess, directed by Georg Jacoby (West Germany, 1951)
- The Merry Widow, directed by Curtis Bernhardt (1952)
- Schützenliesel, directed by Rudolf Schündler (West Germany, 1954)
- The Count of Luxembourg, directed by Werner Jacobs (West Germany, 1957)
- The Merry Widow, directed by Werner Jacobs (Austria, 1962)
- The Csardas Princess, directed by Miklós Szinetár (West Germany, 1971)
- The Count of Luxembourg, directed by Wolfgang Glück (West Germany, 1972)
- Silva, directed by Yan Frid (Soviet Union, 1981, based on The Csardas Princess)

== Plays and librettos ==
- Polenblut, operetta (1913)
