= Thirteen Chairs (1938 film) =

1938 film

- German DVD cover
- German: Dreizehn Stühle
- Directed by: E. W. Emo
- Written by: E. W. Emo; Per Schwenzen
- Based on: The Twelve Chairs by: Ilya Ilf; Yevgeny Petrov
- Produced by: Hans Tost; E. W. Emo
- Starring: Heinz Rühmann; Hans Moser; Inge List
- Cinematography: Eduard Hoesch
- Edited by: Munni Obal
- Music by: Nico Dostal
- Production company: Emo-Film
- Distributed by: Terra Film
- Release date: 18 October 1938
- Running time: 92 minutes
- Country: Germany
- Language: German

Thirteen Chairs (German: Dreizehn Stühle) is a 1938 German comedy film directed by E. W. Emo and starring Heinz Rühmann, Hans Moser and Inge List. It is based on the 1928 novel The Twelve Chairs by Ilf and Petrov, one of numerous adaptations of the work. It was shot at the Terra Studios in Berlin and on location in Vienna. The film's sets were designed by the art director Julius von Borsody.

== Plot ==
A barber shop owner travels to Vienna to receive his inheritance from his late aunt. However, it appears all she has left him are thirteen old chairs. Needing to raise enough money to pay for his ticket back home, he sells them to a second-hand dealer. Only then does he discover a letter from his aunt telling him she has left 100,000 ℛ︁ℳ︁ sewn into one of the chairs. He now sets out to track down the various new owners of the chairs to find the hidden money.

== Cast ==
- Heinz Rühmann as hairdresser Felix Rabe
- Hans Moser as rag-and-bone man Alois Hofbauer
- Annie Rosar as Karoline
- Inge List as Lilly Walter
- Hedwig Bleibtreu as Head Nurse in the House of Wise Men
- Clementia Egies as friend
- Karl Skraup as furniture store owner
- Alfred Neugebauer as Eberhardt
- Maria Waldner as Frau Eberhardt
- Rudolf Carl as Doorman at the Lerchengasse
