= Der Zarewitsch =

1927 operetta by Franz Lehár

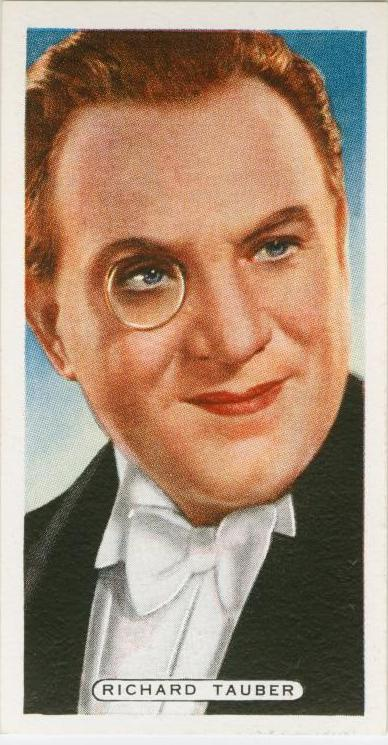
Richard Tauber

Der Zarewitsch (The Tsarevich) is an operetta in three acts by Franz Lehár. The German libretto by Heinz Reichert and Bela Jenbach is based on the 1917 play of the same name by Polish author Gabriela Zapolska. Lehár composed the work, one of his later operettas, as a vehicle for Richard Tauber, the acclaimed Austrian tenor. The work received its first performance at the Deutsches Künstlertheater in Berlin on 16 February 1927, with Tauber and Rita Georg in the leading roles.

== Roles ==
Roles, voice types, premiere cast
Role	Voice type	Premiere cast, 16 February 1927
Tsarevich	tenor	Richard Tauber
Iwan, a valet	baritone	Paul Heidemann
Mascha, Iwan's wife	soprano	Charlotte Ander
Sonja	soprano	Rita Georg
The First Minister	bass	
Master of ceremonies	bass	
Grand Duke	spoken	

== Synopsis ==
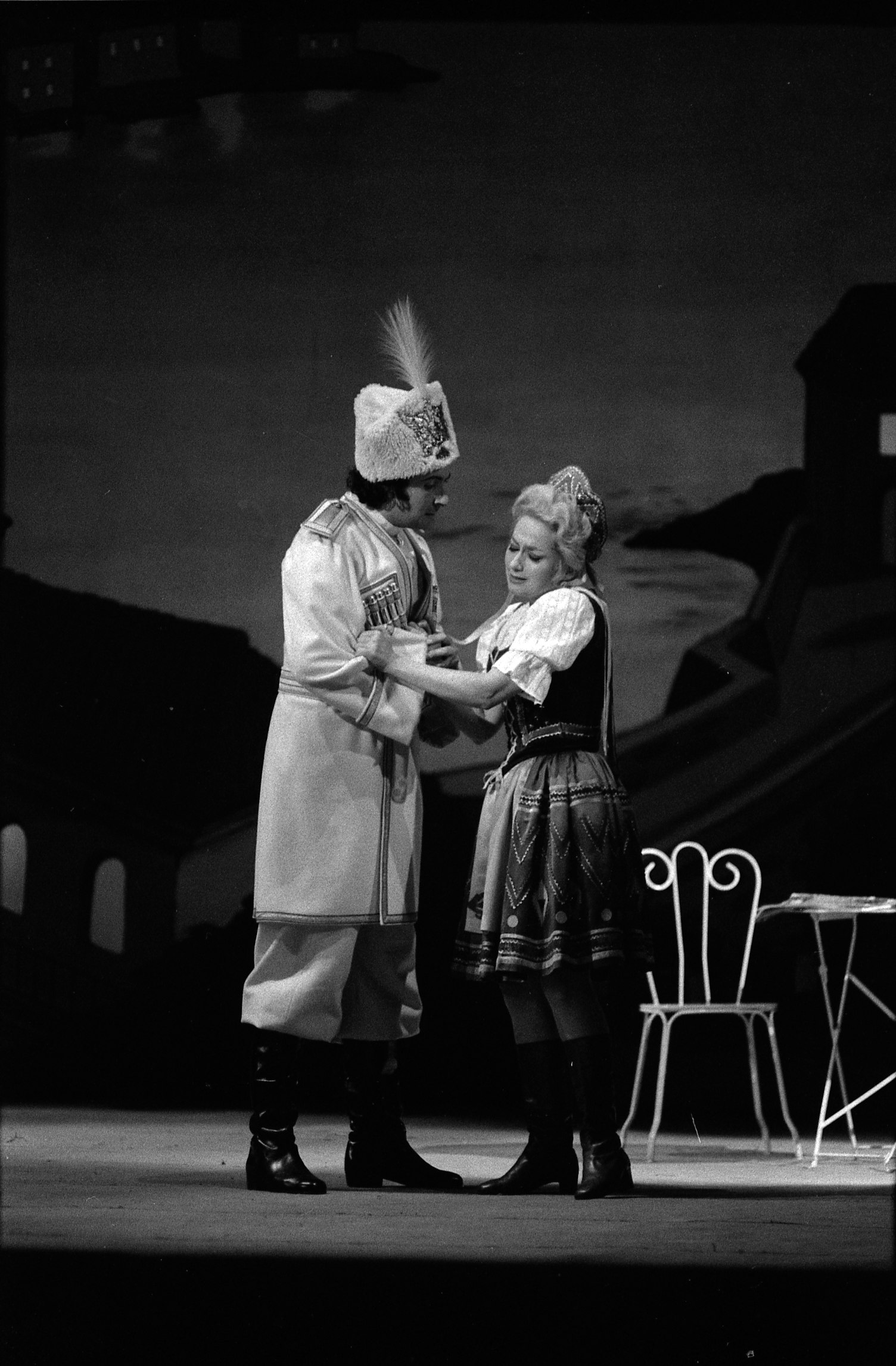
Théâtre du Capitole, Toulouse, 1973

The plot of Der Zarewitsch is loosely based on a true story: the self-imposed exile of the son of Peter the Great, Alexei, who shirked his father's command to become a monk or take interest in the military by running away to his brother-in-law's kingdom, the Holy Roman Empire, with his Finnish mistress disguised as a page. The couple spent two years in hiding until Alexei was compelled by his father to return. His father was paranoid that Alexei was conspiring against him and ultimately Alexei ended up being imprisoned and tortured. The Russian senate convicted him of conspiring against his father and he was sentenced to death. He died due to ill health before he could be executed, most likely resulting from the poor treatment he received while imprisoned.

Reichert's libretto differs on several points from the life of Alexei. First, he changed the story so that the young girl, Sonja, is first seen disguised as a male Circassian dancer. When the Tsarevich runs away with Sonja he believes that she is a boy. Eventually the young prince discovers that Sonja is in fact a girl disguised as a boy. The two fall in love and escape to Naples. A further major difference is that the operetta does not have such a tragic ending, though it is not exactly happy either. Eventually the Zarewitsch learns that his father has died and he knows his relationship cannot continue with Sonja as he is now the Tsar. The operetta ends with a "bittersweet royal–commoner parting".

== Famous arias ==
- "Es steht ein Soldat am Wolgastrand" (A soldier stands on the bank of the Volga)
- Duet: "Dich nur allein, nenn' ich mein" (You alone take I for mine)
- "Einer wird kommen" (Someone will come)
- Volga song: "Allein, wieder allein" (Alone, again alone)
- "Willst du?" (Do you want to?)
- Duet: "Warum hat jeder Frühling, ach, nur einen Mai?" (Why does every spring have only one May?)

== Recordings ==
In 1927, Richard Tauber recorded the two principal arias, and two duets with his first wife, Carlotta Vanconti, for Odeon. Vanconti had taken over the role of Sonja from its creator, Rita Georg, on tour and later sang it in Berlin.

In 1938 a radio broadcast of Der Zarewitsch was at the centre of a court case in which the composer sued a Dutch café owner for allowing his customers to listen to the broadcast, in breach of his copyright.

A 1968 complete recording with Rita Streich (soprano) and Nicolai Gedda (tenor), the Graunke Symphony Orchestra, choir of the Bavarian State Opera, and the Tchaika Balalaika Ensemble conducted by Willy Mattes was issued by German Electrola (EMI).

In 1972, it was produced for television by Unitel under the direction of Austrian Arthur Maria Rabenalt (who also directed the 1954 film) and featuring cinematography by Heinz Pehlke The 1972 TV production starred Wieslaw Ochman in the title role and Teresa Stratas as Sonja. In 1973, it was issued on VHS cassettes, and in 2007 for the first time on DVD, in collaboration between Deutsche Grammophon and Unitel.
