= Silva (film) =

1944 film by Aleksandr Ivanovsky

- Directed by: Aleksandr Ivanovsky
- Written by: Leo Stein (operetta); Bela Jenbach (operetta)
- Starring: Zoya Smirnova-Nemirovich; Sergei Martinson
- Cinematography: Iosif Martov
- Music by: Emmerich Kalman (operetta)
- Production company: Sverdlovsk Film Studios
- Release date: 1944
- Country: Soviet Union
- Language: Russian

Silva (Russian: Сильва) is a 1944 Soviet musical comedy film directed by Aleksandr Ivanovsky and starring Zoya Smirnova-Nemirovich and Sergei Martinson. It was part of a cycle of operetta films made in European cinema during the era.

== Plot ==
Silva Varescu, a celebrated singer, gives a farewell performance before her planned tour in America, during which her lover, Prince Edwin, arrives late.

After receiving a telegram from his parents demanding he end his relationship with Silva and return home, Edwin proposes to Silva at the cabaret, and their engagement is celebrated. However, soon after, the couple parts ways. Heartbroken, Silva discovers Edwin's planned engagement to Countess Stasi, orchestrated by his parents. Meanwhile, Edwin delays the wedding, while Stasi falls for Edwin’s friend, Bonni.

At a formal gathering at Prince Wolyapuk's estate, Silva appears disguised as a countess, rekindling her romance with Edwin and disrupting the planned engagement. The evening ends in scandal when Wolyapuk discovers his own wife was once a cabaret singer. In the final act, Silva and Edwin reconcile at the cabaret, choosing love despite societal pressures.

== Cast ==
- Zoya Smirnova-Nemirovich as Silva Varescu
- Niyaz Dautov as Edvin
- Margarita Sakalis as Stassi
- Sergey Martinson as Boni
- Sergey Dybcho as Leopold Volyapyuk
- Nina Dintan as Julianna Volyapyuk
- Georgiy Kugushev as Ferry
- Vladimir Taskin as Rons Volyapyuk
- Aleksandra Korvet as the maid
- Aleksandr Matkovsky as assistant director
- Glikeriya Bogdanova-Chesnokova as Princess Weglersheim

== Production ==
The film is an adaptation of the 1915 operetta Die Csárdásfürstin (also known as Silva after its title character) composed by Emmerich Kalman with a libretto by Leo Stein and Bela Jenbach. The first staging of the operetta took place in Russia in 1916 in St. Petersburg during the war with Germany, but patriotism required to change the title of operetta from Queen of Czardas to the neutral Silva in Russia. The Soviet movie Silva was made at the Sverdlovsk Film Studios in Yekaterinburg.

== Popularity ==
The film proved a major success with Soviet audiences, who during the later stages of the Second World War sought escapist entertainment and largely rejected films with war themes. The money it earned per copy of the film issued exceeded even that of the most popular films of the year Guilty Without Fault.

== Bibliography ==
- Egorova, Tatiana K. Soviet Film Music: An Historical Survey. Psychology Press, 1997.
- Spring, Derek / Taylor, Richard. Stalinism and Soviet Cinema. Routledge, 2013.
