= The Gentleman Without a Residence (1925 film) =

1925 film

- Directed by: Heinrich Bolten-Baeckers
- Written by: Heinrich Bolten-Baeckers
- Produced by: Heinrich Bolten-Baeckers
- Starring: Georg Alexander; Georg John; Paul Otto; Julius Brandt
- Cinematography: Hermann Boettger; Albert Schattmann
- Production company: BB-Film-Fabrikation
- Distributed by: UFA
- Release date: 11 November 1925
- Country: Germany
- Languages: Silent; German intertitles

The Gentleman Without a Residence (German: Der Herr ohne Wohnung) is a 1925 German silent comedy film directed by Heinrich Bolten-Baeckers and starring Georg Alexander, Georg John and Paul Otto. It was one of a number of popular comedies released by UFA alongside its more prestigious art films. The film's art direction was by Erich Czerwonski.

== Cast ==
- Georg Alexander as Alfred
- Georg John as Fürst
- Paul Otto as Professor
- Julius Brandt as Droschkenkutscher
- Richard Ludwig as Lawyer
- Heinrich Gotho as zweiter Professor
- Margarete Lanner as Frau des Professors

== See also ==
- The Gentleman Without a Residence (1915)
- The Gentleman Without a Residence (1934)
- Who's Your Lady Friend? (1937)

== Bibliography ==
- Kreimeier, Klaus. The Ufa Story: A History of Germany's Greatest Film Company, 1918-1945. University of California Press, 1999.
