= Pavel Feldt =

Soviet conductor and composer (1905–1960)

Pavel Emilyevich Feldt (Russian: Павел Эмильевич Фельдт; 1905–1960) was a Soviet conductor and composer. Working for the Kirov Theater he conducted several ballet premieres including Shostakovich's The Limpid Stream and Khachaturian's Gayane.

He studied at the Petrograd-Leningrad Conservatory where Shostakovich was a fellow student. He became a ballet conductor at MALEGOT and later at the Kirov Theater in Leningrad. He conducted the premiere of The Limpid Stream in 1935. In 1942, while the company was evacuated in Perm following the German invasion of Russia, he conducted the premiere of Khachaturian's Gayane. He also conducted the first production of Khachaturian's ballet, Spartacus, in 1956.
