= A Wedding Dream =

- German film postyer
- German: Ein Hochzeitstraum
- Directed by: Erich Engel
- Written by: Axel Nielsen (play); Emil Burri; Inge Lux
- Produced by: Karl Julius Fritzsche
- Starring: Ida Wüst; Heinz Salfner; Inge List
- Cinematography: Friedl Behn-Grund
- Edited by: Walter Fredersdorf
- Music by: Peter Kreuder
- Production company: Tobis Film
- Distributed by: Tobis Film; Tobis-Sascha Film (Austria)
- Release date: 8 October 1936
- Running time: 96 minutes
- Country: Germany
- Language: German

A Wedding Dream (German: Ein Hochzeitstraum) is a 1936 German comedy film directed by Erich Engel and starring Ida Wüst, Heinz Salfner and Inge List. It was shot at the Johannisthal Studios of Tobis Film in Berlin. The film's sets were designed by the art directors Karl Haacker and Hermann Warm.

== Plot ==
The plot is set just after the First World War in Poland close to the border with Russia where a widow runs a successful inn. She has made enough money and now wishes to settle down and marry a nobleman, which will consequently allow her daughter Vera to make a good social match. However, things go wrong during a holiday on the French Riviera when her daughter falls in love with a chauffeur instead of the prince she had planned for her. To cap it all she discovers that the supposed nobleman she herself has married is in fact just a servant.

== Cast ==
- Ida Wüst as Frau Polenska
- Heinz Salfner as Fürst Narischkin
- Inge List as Vera Polenska
- Ferdinand Marian as Paul Puschkinow
- Theo Lingen as Prinz von Illyrien
- Hans Junkermann as François
- Hans Leibelt as Count Morotschin
- Julius Brandt as Monet
- Bruno Hübner as Iwan
- Werner Scharf as Michalek
- Erich Meißel as Officer
- Georg A. Profé as Officer
- S. O. Schoening as border soldier
- Carl Heinrich Worth as Grenzbeamter
- Luise Hohorst
- Heinrich Berg
- Egon Brosig
- Max Mothes
- Ernst Rotmund
- Richard Ludwig
- Josef Karma
- Kurt Klotz-Oberland
- Kurt Mahncke
- Ernst Rennspies
