= The Merry Widow (1918 film) =

1918 film

- Directed by: Michael Curtiz
- Written by: Victor Léon (libretto); Leo Stein (libretto)
- Screenplay by: Michael Curtiz
- Based on: The Merry Widow; 1905 operetta by Franz Lehár Victor Léon (libretto); Leo Stein (libretto)
- Produced by: Gyula Schönberger
- Starring: Mihály Várkonyi; Berta Valero; Endre Boross; Árpád id. Latabár; Miklós Szomory; József Bánhidy
- Cinematography: Eduard Hoesch
- Music by: Franz Lehár
- Release date: 1918
- Running time: 70 minutes
- Country: Hungary
- Language: Silent

The Merry Widow (Hungarian: A Víg özvegy) is a 1918 Hungarian musical film directed by Michael Curtiz. It is based on the 1905 operetta by Franz Lehár.

== Plot summary ==
The film follows Danilo and the wealthy widow Hanna Glavári. Danilo becomes involved in efforts to ensure that Hanna's fortune remains in her homeland, while a romance develops between the pair.

== Cast ==
- Mihály Várkonyi as Danilo
- Berta Valero as Glavári Hanna
- Endre Boross as Nyegus
- Árpád id. Latabár as Zéta Mirko, montenegrói követ
- Miklós Szomory
- József Bánhidy
