= The Csardas Princess (1934 film) =

1934 film

- German: Die Czardasfürstin
- Directed by: Georg Jacoby
- Written by: Leo Stein (libretto); Bela Jenbach (libretto); Georg Jacoby; Bobby E. Lüthge; Hans H. Zerlett
- Produced by: Max Pfeiffer
- Starring: Mártha Eggerth; Hans Söhnker; Paul Kemp
- Cinematography: Carl Hoffmann
- Edited by: Herbert B. Fredersdorf
- Music by: Emmerich Kálmán
- Production company: UFA
- Distributed by: UFA
- Release date: 29 June 1934
- Running time: 95 minutes
- Country: Germany
- Language: German

The Csardas Princess (German: Die Czardasfürstin) is a 1934 German operetta film directed by Georg Jacoby and starring Mártha Eggerth, Hans Söhnker and Paul Kemp. It is based on the 1915 operetta Die Csárdásfürstin composed by Emmerich Kálmán.

The film's sets were designed by the art directors Robert Herlth and Walter Röhrig. A separate French-language version Princesse Czardas was also produced.

In 1951 Jacoby remade the film starring his wife Marika Rökk.

== Cast ==
- Mártha Eggerth as Sylva Varescu
- Hans Söhnker as Prinz Edwin Weylersheim
- Paul Kemp as Graf Bonipart Kancsianu
- Inge List as Countess Stasi von Planitz
- Paul Hörbiger as Feri von Kerekes
- Hans Junkermann as Der Kommandeur
- Friedrich Ulmer as Fürst Weylersheim
- Ida Wüst as Fürstin Weylersheim
- Edwin Jürgensen as Der Manager
- Andor Heltai as Der Zigeunerprimas
- Ilse Fürstenberg as Mädi vom Chantant
- Marina von Ditmar as Mädi vom Chantant
- Charlott Daudert as Mädi vom Chantant
- Karin Luesebrink as Mädi vom Chantant
- Margot Höpfner as Mädi vom Chantant
- Hedi Höpfner as Mädi vom Chantant
- Liselotte Hessler as Mädi vom Chantant
- Olga Engl as Die Ankleiderin
