= The Csardas Princess (1951 film) =

1951 film

- German film poster
- German: Die Csardasfürstin
- Directed by: Georg Jacoby
- Written by: Georg Jacoby; Bela Jenbach (libretto); Bobby E. Lüthge; Leo Stein (libretto)
- Produced by: Rolf Meyer
- Starring: Marika Rökk; Johannes Heesters; Hubert Marischka
- Cinematography: Bruno Mondi
- Edited by: Martha Dübber
- Music by: Charles Kalman; Willy Mattes
- Production companies: Deutsche Styria Film; Junge Film-Union Rolf Meyer
- Distributed by: Herzog Film
- Release date: 20 December 1951
- Running time: 93 minutes
- Country: West Germany
- Language: German

The Csardas Princess (German: Die Csardasfürstin) is a 1951 German musical film directed by Georg Jacoby and starring Marika Rökk, Johannes Heesters and Hubert Marischka. It is based on the 1915 operetta The Csardas Princess and is part of the tradition of operetta films. It was shot at the Bendestorf Studios and on location in Taormina, Rome and Paris. The film's sets were designed by the art director Erich Kettelhut. It was shot in agfacolor.

Jacoby had previously directed an earlier version in 1934 starring Marta Eggerth.

== Cast ==
- Marika Rökk as Sylva Varescu
- Johannes Heesters as Edwin von Weylersheim
- Hubert Marischka as Feri von Kerekes
- Walter Müller as Boni Kancsianu
- Jeanette Schultze as Stasi Planitz
- Margarete Slezak as Mathilde von Weylersheim
- Franz Schafheitlin as Leopold von Weylersheim
- Arno Assmann as Mac Grave
- Helmuth Rudolph as Gesandter
