= The Csardas Princess (1927 film) =

1927 film

- Directed by: Hanns Schwarz
- Written by: Leo Stein (libretto); Bela Jenbach (libretto); Wilhelm Thiele; Ladislao Vajda
- Produced by: Peter Ostermayr
- Starring: Liane Haid; Imre Ráday; Ferenc Vendrey
- Cinematography: Curt Courant
- Music by: Artur Guttmann
- Production company: Peter Ostermayr Produktion
- Distributed by: UFA
- Release date: 15 March 1927
- Countries: Germany; Hungary
- Languages: Silent; German intertitles

The Csardas Princess (German: Die Czardasfürstin) is a 1927 German-Hungarian silent romance film directed by Hanns Schwarz and starring Liane Haid, Imre Ráday and Ferenc Vendrey. It is based on the 1915 operetta The Csardas Princess, the title referring to the popular Hungarian Csárdás dance.

It was shot at the Babelsberg Studios in Berlin.

== Cast ==
- Liane Haid as Sylva Verescu
- Imre Ráday as Luftikus
- Ferenc Vendrey as Baron Franz von Kerekes
- Kálmán Zátony
- Oskar Marion as Prinz Edwin von Weylersheim
- Oreste Bilancia
- Gyula Zilahi as Lebemann
- Ibi Boya as Stasi
- Bolla Marischka

== Bibliography ==
- Grange, William. Cultural Chronicle of the Weimar Republic. Scarecrow Press, 2008.
