= Who's Your Lady Friend? =

- Vic Oliver, Frances Day and Romney Brent in the film.
- Directed by: Carol Reed
- Written by: Bela Jenbach (play); Rudolf Österreicher (play); Julius Horst; Anthony Kimmins
- Produced by: Martin Sabine
- Starring: Frances Day; Vic Oliver; Betty Stockfeld
- Cinematography: Jan Stallich; Philip Tannura
- Edited by: Ernest Aldridge
- Music by: Robert Stolz
- Production company: Dorian Films
- Distributed by: Associated British Film Distributors (UK)
- Release date: 27 December 1937 (UK)
- Running time: 73 minutes
- Country: United Kingdom
- Language: English

Who's Your Lady Friend? is a 1937 British comedy film directed by Carol Reed and starring Frances Day, Vic Oliver and Betty Stockfeld. It was written by Julius Horst and Anthony Kimminsbased on the 1913 play Der Herr ohne Wohnung by Bela Jenbach and Rudolf Österreicher, which had previously been made into the 1934 Austrian film The Gentleman Without a Residence. It was an independent production made at Ealing Studios, with sets were designed by the art director Erwin Scharf.

== Preservation status ==
The British Film Institute National Archive holds a collection of ephemera but no film or video materials.

== Premise ==
The secretary of a beauty specialist accidentally brings the wrong person back from the railway station, triggering a series of confusions.

== Cast ==
- Frances Day as Lulu
- Vic Oliver as Doctor Mangold
- Betty Stockfeld as Mrs. Mangold
- Romney Brent as Fred
- Margaret Lockwood as Mimi
- Sarah Churchill as maid
- Marcelle Rogez as Yvonne Fatigay
- Muriel George as Mrs. Somers
- Frederick Ranalow as cabby

== Critical reception ==
The Monthly Film Bulletin wrote: "Vic Oliver acts very pleasantly as the beauty specialist; Frances Day, as the cabaret artist who starts all the trouble, appears to good effect in two or three well-produced cabaret turns (her French accent is very far from convincing, but few will be critical of this). Frederick Ranalow gives an enjoyable and tuneful performance as a singing cabman with an ancient cab and an even more ancient horse. The general level of the acting is very competent."

The Daily Film Renter wrote: "Viennese comedy of marital infelicities and bedroom mix-ups handled with refreshing lightheartedness by sound cast. Honours go to Vic Oliver for polished light comedy performance, and to Frances Day for piquant portrait of amorous cabaret singer. Opulent settings and clever continuity help diaphanous story to register to full effect. Definitely bright and happy entertainment in familiar farce comedy vein."

Picture Show wrote: "Bright dialogue, deft direction, and some well-staged song and dance scenes combine to make attractive, frothy entertainment."

TV Guide called the film a "Cute farce and one of the many British programmers Reed directed before moving up to bigger features."
