= Konstantin Derzhavin =

Russian writer (1903–1956)

Konstantin Nikolayevich Derzhavin (Russian: Константи́н Никола́евич Держа́вин, 18 February [O.S. 5 February] 1903 in Batumi – 2 November 1956 in Leningrad) was a Russian Soviet literary and theater critic, translator, and writer. He wrote the libretto to Aram Khachaturian's ballet Gayane. His wife was the ballerina Nina Aleksandrovna Anisimova.
