= Character dance =

Subdivision of classical dance

Character dance is a specific subdivision of classical dance. It is the stylized representation of a traditional folk or national dance, mostly from European countries, and uses movements and music which have been adapted for the theater.

Character dance is integral to much of the classical ballet repertoire. A good example of character dance within ballet is the series of national dances which take place in Act III of Swan Lake. The ballet Don Quixote also features many character variations based on traditional Spanish dances. Popular character dance adaptations for ballet also include the national dances of Hungary, Russia, Poland, Italy and Spain: csárdás, mazurka, tarantella, flamenco, etc.

One of the best known schools that incorporate character dance to teaching syllabus is Vaganova Ballet Academy. It is widely taught in the United States, United Kingdom and Australia and in Central and Eastern Europe (Czech Republic, Hungary, Ukraine, Latvia, etc.). It is integral to the training of students at the School of Nashville Ballet, Royal Ballet School, the Australian Ballet School and variety of other dance schools around the world. It is also taught as a separate skill within the graded examinations syllabus of the Royal Academy of Dance, Statni Konzervator Praha. Most performing companies or schools elsewhere are not familiar with the history or technique of this style. Therefore, the term character dance is often used in misleading ways that have no bearing to the original definition in ballet terminology.

Yuri Slonimsky writes in his book The Bolshoi Ballet (Second edition 1960, p. 8) on the history of character dance:

....The Moscow theater thrived because at the beginning it was free from Court tutelage...another important factor was the popularity of various fairs and festivals among the Moscovites. It was here, at the turn of the 19th century that a new genre came into being-one inspired by the national comic opera-dance scenes suggested by folk festivals, games, Yule-tide, Shrovetide Festivals, etc. These dances were created by Vasily Balashov, a former inmate of the Orphanage, soloist of the Court Stage at St. Petersburg and choreographer of the Petrovsky Theatre in Moscow. Petersburg's choreographers Ivan Valberg, A. August, and others after them, borrowed and developed Balashov's methods. And in 1812-14 Russian folk dances were successfully shown by Charles Didelot and his colleagues in a "Russian Divertissement" at King's Theatre in London.

Folk traditions have been incorporated into what is known as ballet for centuries but it was not until Aleksandr Shirayev, Assistant to Marius Petipa, that character dance became a unique and codified art-form that takes its rightful place as an integral part of classical ballet.

Character dances are usually performed in shoes or boots, with a suede sole and a small heel. Men typically wear black character shoes and women typically wear a flesh coloured shoe with a larger, more feminine heel, but sometimes black shoes too.

== See also ==
- Grotesque dance
