= The Gentleman Without a Residence (1934 film) =

1934 film

- German film poster
- German: Der Herr ohne Wohnung
- Directed by: E. W. Emo
- Written by: Bela Jenbach (play); Rudolf Österreicher (play); Julius Horst
- Starring: Paul Hörbiger; Hilde von Stolz; Hermann Thimig
- Cinematography: Eduard Hoesch
- Music by: Robert Stolz
- Production companies: O. Glück, Wien
- Release date: 22 December 1934
- Running time: 84 minutes
- Country: Austria
- Language: German

The Gentleman Without a Residence (German: Der Herr ohne Wohnung) is a 1934 Austrian comedy film directed by E. W. Emo and starring Paul Hörbiger, Hilde von Stolz, and Hermann Thimig. The film's sets were designed by the art director Julius von Borsody.

The film was remade in Britain three years later as Who's Your Lady Friend?.

== Cast ==
- Karin Evans as Mary Tired
- Lizzi Holzschuh as Ellinor Gray
- Paul Hörbiger as Professor Mangold
- Adele Sandrock as Mrs. Sommer
- Leo Slezak as Kreindl
- Hermann Thimig as Fred Reigersheim
- Hilde von Stolz as Mrs. Mangold
- Hanna Waag as Mimi
