= Emil Leyde =

German filmmaker

Emil Leyde (8 January 1879 in Kassel – January 1955 in Berlin) was a German film director, screenwriter, cameraman and film producer.

== Filmography (selection) ==
- 1915: Das Kriegspatenkind
- 1918: Der Sonnwendhof.
- 1919: Die lichtscheue Dame.
- 1919: Alte Zeit – neue Zeit.
- 1919: Die Czàrdàsfürstin.
- 1919: Wem gehört das Kind?
- 1920: Alpentragödie.
- 1923: Fiat Lux
- 1924: Die Rieseneishöhlen des Dachsteins
