= Aleksandr Ivanovsky =

Soviet film director and screenwriter

- Born: Aleksandr Viktorovich Ivanovsky; November 29, 1881; Kazan, Russian Empire
- Died: January 12, 1968 (aged 86); Leningrad, Soviet Union
- Occupations: Film and theater director, screenwriter
- Years active: 1918–1967

Aleksandr Viktorovich Ivanovsky (Russian: Александр Викторович Ивановский; November 29, 1881 – January 12, 1968) was a screenwriter and film director in the Soviet Union. He was awarded the Stalin Prize in 1941, for his work on the 1940 film Musical Story. His 1944 operetta film Silva was one of the most popular releases in the Soviet Union that year.

== Selected filmography ==
- Comedienne (1923)
- The Palace and the Fortress (1924)
- The Decembrists (1927)
- House of Greed (1933)
- Dubrovsky (1936)
- Musical Story (1940)
- Spring Song (1941)
- Anton Ivanovich Is Angry (1941)
- Silva (1944)
- Russian Ballerina (1947)
- Tamer of Tigers (1955)

== Bibliography ==
- Spring, Derek & Taylor, Richard. Stalinism and Soviet Cinema. Routledge, 2013.
