= Road of Hell =

Road of Hell may refer to:

- Road of Hell (1931 film), an American drama film
- Road of Hell (1946 film), an Argentinian film
- Road of Hell (1951 film), a Mexican thriller film
