= Manuel Granada =

Argentine actor (1896–1974)

Paul Ellis (Manuel Granada), circa 1929

Manuel Granada (6 November 1896 - 30 January 1974) was an Argentine actor who appeared in American, Spanish, Argentine and Mexican films. For the first half of his career, he worked under the names Paul Ellis and Manuel Granado.

Granada was born Benjamin Ingenito in Buenos Aires on November 6, 1896. He made his film debut in the Metro-Goldwyn film The Bandolero in 1924 under the name Manuel Granado. He was signed to a contract by Louis B. Mayer and listed as a Metro-Goldwyn principal player in the same year. An April 1925 article by Harry Carr for Motion Picture dubbed him 'Hollywood's New Sheik.' Like other Latino actors in silent-era Hollywood, he had adapted a WASPy screen name, which stood in contrast to his dark features, a look that was popular at the time. Despite this, he was still cast almost exclusively as secondary ethnic characters, unlike his contemporaries in silent-era Hollywood like Gilbert Roland and Barry Norton (a fellow Argentine). He was singled out for praise by The Los Angeles Herald Examiner and other Los Angeles newspapers after the 1926 premiere of The Dancer of Paris.

The coming of sound found Paul Ellis relegated to bit parts, though he did secure some substantial roles in Spanish-language versions of English-language films such as La Voluntad del muerto (1930). In 1930, he also wrote and appeared in the film Alma De Gaucho. Ellis also appeared in Charros, gauchos y manolas, a musical directed by Xavier Cugat. These films were usually released in Spanish-language territories only. He continued to appear in American films for another ten years, mostly in brief uncredited roles, though he is remembered by some for his appearance in Marihuana (1936), which retains a small cult following. He made his last American film, Whistling in the Dark, in 1941.

Still using the name Paul Ellis, Granada next shows up in films in 1947 in Argentina, and continued to appear in films in Argentina. He appeared in the Mexican/Argentine co-production La Tierra del Fuego se apaga.

== Selected filmography ==
- The Bandolero (1924)
- Pretty Ladies (1925)
- The Pace that Thrills (1925)
- The Dancer from Paris (1926)
- Three Hours (1927)
- The Younger Generation (1929)
- In Old California (1929)
- The Bridge of San Luis Rey (1929)
- Charros, gauchos y manolas (1930)
- Alma de Gaucho (1930)
- La Voluntad del muerto (1930)
- The Common Law (1931)
- El pasado acusa (1931)
- Hombres de mi vida (1932)
- Soñadores de gloria (1932)
- No Man of Her Own (1932)
- Contrabando (1932)
- Laughing at Life (1933)
- The Woman Condemned (1934)
- One Night of Love (1934)
- The Merry Widow (1934)
- Women Must Dress (1935)
- Captured in Chinatown (1935)
- Reckless (1935)
- Tailspin Tommy in the Great Air Mystery (1935)
- Rip Roaring Riley (1935)
- Never Too Late (1935)
- Wife vs. Secretary (1936)
- Marihuana (1936)
- Murder at Glen Athol (1936)
- Heroes of the Alamo (1937)
- El Trovador de la Radio (1938)
- The Buccaneer (1938)
- Bachelor Father (1939)
- Di que me quieres (1939)
- Ninotchka (1939)
- Rose of Washington Square (1939)
- Arizona Gang Busters (1940)
- Down Argentine Way (1940)
- They Met in Argentina (1941)
- Blood and Sand (1941)
- Too Many Blondes (1941)
- Desperate Cargo (1941)
- Whistling in the Dark (1941)
- La senda oscura (1947)
- El precio de una vida (1947)
- Derecho viejo (1951)
- Rebelión en los llanos (1953)
- Stella Maris (1953)
- El pescador de coplas (1954)
- La Tierra del Fuego se apaga (1955)
