= Maria Alba =

Spanish-American actress (1905–1999)

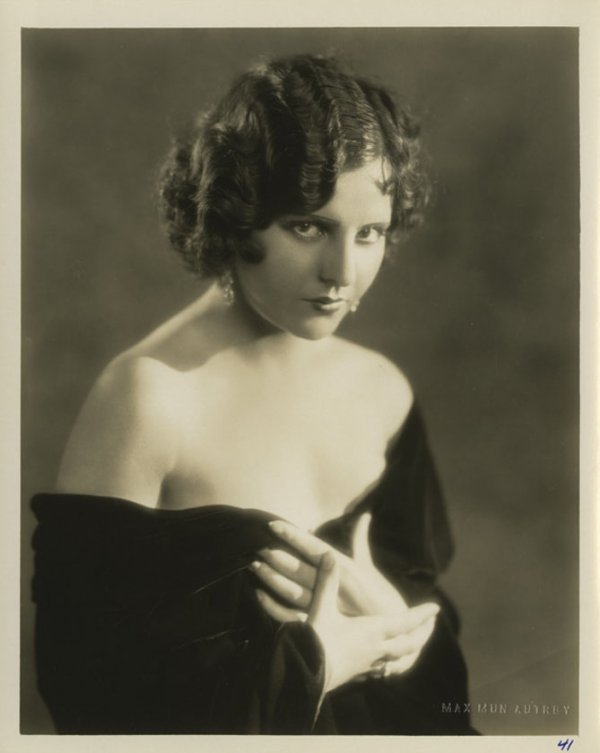
- Alba in 1930
- Born: María del Pilar Margarita Casajuana Martínez; December 28, 1905
- Died: October 26, 1999 (aged 93)
- Other name: Maria Casajuana
- Occupation: Actress
- Years active: 1928–1946

María del Pilar Margarita Casajuana Martínez (28 December 1905 – 26 October 1999), known professionally as Maria Alba, was a Spanish-American film actress.

== Biography ==
Signed by the Fox Film Corporation after winning a Fox Film contest in Spain, Maria Casajuana came to the United States in 1927 as a second cabin class passenger on the S/S Suffern, which sailed from the Port of Le Havre, France, on 16 April, and arrived at the Port of New York, 26 April 1927.

Originally billed as Maria Casajuana, she appeared in 25 feature films, starting with Road House in 1928 and ending with La morena de mi copla in 1946. Her most notable appearances (as Maria Alba) were probably as "Saturday" in the 1932 Douglas Fairbanks film Mr. Robinson Crusoe, and as the exotic "Princess Nadji" in the Bela Lugosi serial The Return of Chandu. Other Latin actresses working in films, like Lupe Vélez or Dolores del Río, became fluent in English, but Maria Alba spoke English with a thick accent, which limited her casting opportunities.

== Partial filmography ==
- Her Blue, Black Eyes (1927, Short)
- A Girl in Every Port (1928) - Maria Buenjolla / Chiquita - Girl in Rio de Janeiro
- Road House (1928) - Spanish Marla
- Blindfold (1928) - Pepita
- Joy Street (1929) - Agnes
- Hell's Heroes (1929) - Carmelita
- Charros, gauchos y manolas (1930) - Spanish artist
- El cuerpo del delito (1930) - Señorita Delroy
- La fuerza del querer (1930) - Shirley
- Olimpia (1930) - Princess Olimpia
- Los que danzan (1930) - Norma Brady
- El código penal (1931) - Mary Brady
- Road of Hell (1931) - Angela
- Su última noche (1931) - Elena Desano
- Just a Gigolo (1931) - A French Wife
- Goldie (1931) - Dolores
- La ley del harem (1931) - Fatima
- Almost Married (1932) - Mariette (uncredited)
- Mr. Robinson Crusoe (1932) - Saturday
- Hypnotized (1932) - Princess Mitzi
- Kiss of Araby (1933) - Dolores Mendez
- The Return of Chandu (1934) - Nadji - Princess of Egypt
- Flirting with Danger (1934) - Rosita
- West of the Pecos (1934) - Dolores
- Great God Gold (1935) - Elena Nitto
- El Hijo de Nadie (1946, Mexico)
- La Morena de Mi Colpa (1946, Mexico) - Pepa (final film role)
