= Flower of Night =

1925 film by Paul Bern

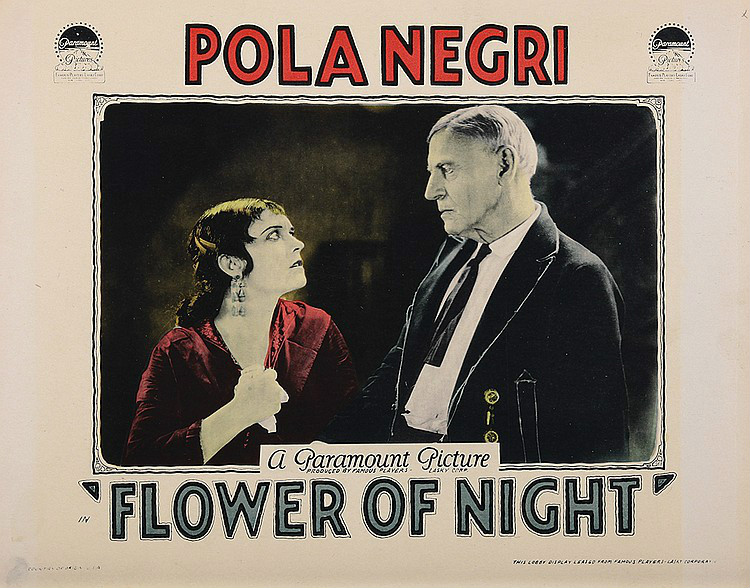
- Lobby card
- Directed by: Paul Bern
- Written by: Willis Goldbeck (scenario)
- Story by: Joseph Hergesheimer
- Produced by: Adolph Zukor; Jesse Lasky
- Starring: Pola Negri
- Cinematography: Bert Glennon
- Distributed by: Paramount Pictures
- Release date: October 18, 1925
- Running time: 70 minutes
- Country: United States
- Language: Silent (English intertitles)

Flower of Night is a 1925 American silent drama film directed by Paul Bern. Famous Players–Lasky produced the film with Paramount Pictures releasing. Joseph Hergesheimer provided an original story for the screen.

== Plot ==
As described in a film magazine review, Don Giraldo y Villalon and his daughter Carlota, high caste Spaniards living in California at the time of the gold rush, are dispossessed of most of their land holdings, including the Flor de Noche mine in the hills above their hacienda. John Basset has come from the East to assist the superintendent of the mine. He stops at the hacienda to learn the way to the mine, and, at sight of him, Carlota loves him. She accepts an invitation to a miners’ dance, to which she goes only that she may see Basset again. Basset, disgusted with the revel, ignores her. When she returns home and tells her father she has disgraced herself and the family name he commits suicide. Carlota goes to San Francisco and becomes a dance hall entertainer. She meets Luke Rand, leader of the Vigilantes, and has sex with him in an effort to win Basset, who scorns her. Rand tries to confiscate the Flor de Noche mine to win Carlota. Basset in defending the mine is wounded and Carlota, altering her mind, helps him escape. Rand overtakes them, and in the fight that ensues Basset kills him. The love note is the loudest one as the story ends.

== Cast ==
- Joseph J. Dowling as Don Geraldo y Villalón (credited as Joseph Dowling)
- Pola Negri as Carlota, Don Geraldo's daughter
- Youcca Troubetzkoy as John Basset
- Warner Oland as Luke Rand
- Ed Brady as Derck Bylandt (credited as Edwin J. Brady)
- Eulalie Jensen as Mrs. Bylandt
- Cesare Gravina as Servant
- Gustav von Seyffertitz as Vigilante Leader
- Helen Lee Worthing as Josefa
- Anastasia Georgina Kissel (credited as Thais Valdemar)
- Manuel Acosta
- Frankie Bailey
- Buck Black (uncredited)

== Censorship ==
Before Flower of Night could be exhibited in Kansas, the Kansas Board of Review required the elimination of all but one scene of Carlotta smoking, a boy being drunk, a hanging scene, and all but one scene of mixing drinks.

== Preservation ==
With no prints of Flower of Night located in any film archives, it is a lost film.
