= Peacock Feathers =

1925 film

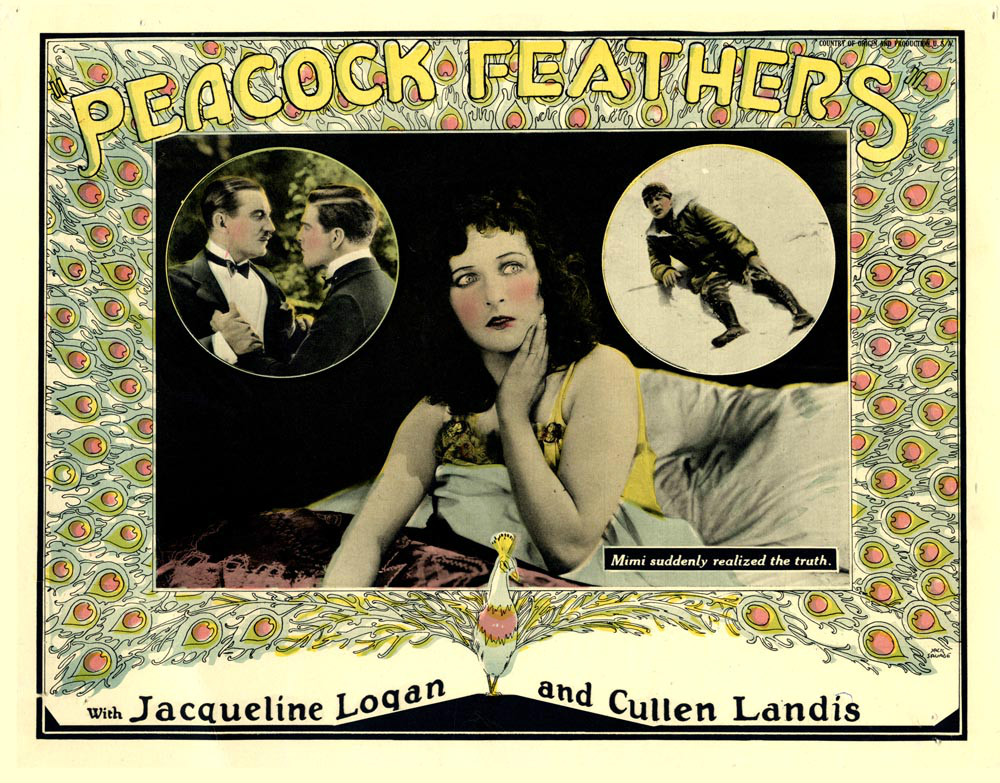
- Lobby card
- Directed by: Svend Gade
- Screenplay by: James O. Spearing; Svend Gade
- Based on: Peacock Feathers by Temple Bailey
- Starring: Jacqueline Logan; Cullen Landis; Ward Crane; George Fawcett; Emmett King; Youcca Troubetzkoy
- Cinematography: Charles J. Stumar
- Production company: Universal Pictures
- Distributed by: Universal Pictures
- Release date: October 18, 1925
- Running time: 70 minutes
- Country: United States
- Language: Silent (English intertitles)

Peacock Feathers is a 1925 American drama film directed by Svend Gade and written by James O. Spearing and Svend Gade. It is based on a 1924 novel of the same name by Temple Bailey. The film stars Jacqueline Logan, Cullen Landis, Ward Crane, George Fawcett, Emmett King, and Youcca Troubetzkoy. The film was released on October 18, 1925, by Universal Pictures. A portion of the film was in the two-strip Technicolor process.

== Plot ==
As described in a film magazine reviews, Mimi Le Brun is introduced to Jerry Chandler by a cousin. He is asked to visit Mimi, and by the time he comes away he is in love. She refuses his proposal of marriage on the ground that he is too poor, and becomes engaged to a wealthy man whom she does not love. Jerry's uncle George dies and leaves him a ranch and what is said to be a castle. He and Mimi elope, but when they see the shack that was called a castle, there is a bad time in view of their disillusionment. Mimi accepts the situation until the rejected wealthy man appears on the scene. She plans to run away with him, but when Jerry meets with an accident, she goes with him instead.

== Cast ==
- Jacqueline Logan as Mimi Le Brun
- Cullen Landis as Jerry Chandler
- Ward Crane as Andrew Fuller
- George Fawcett as Uncle George
- Emmett King as Reverend Chandler
- Youcca Troubetzkoy as Lionel Clark
- Aggie Herring as Mrs. Hayes
- Dunbar Raymond as Mrs. Le Brun

== Preservation ==
With no prints of Peacock Feathers in any film archives, it is a lost film.
