= Joan Meredith =

American actress (1907–1980)

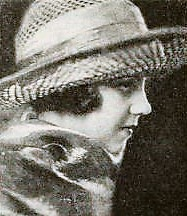
Joan Meredith

Joan Meredith (January 28, 1907 – October 13, 1980) was an American silent film actress.

== Biography ==
Meredith was born in Hot Springs, Arkansas, and moved to Hollywood in the mid-1920s after winning a beauty contest that brought her to the attention of talent scouts. She was pretty, with a petite build and was 5 feet tall. Her first credited role was in the 1925 film Blue Blood, starring alongside George Walsh. She starred in two films that year, and was one of thirteen girls selected to be "WAMPAS Baby Stars", a list which included June Marlowe, now famous for her role on the Our Gang serials. Her second film of 1925 was opposite Dorothy Dwan in The Perfect Clown.

In 1926, she starred in four films, the first of which would place her alongside George Walsh once again, this time in The Count of Luxembourg. Her second film that year was The Fighting Boob, followed by a western placing her in the role of heroine opposite early cowboy film star Bill Cody. However, her career never really took off as hoped, and she would leave acting behind after only six films. Her last film of her short-lived career was her best remembered, due to it helping to launch the career of Mae Busch, titled The Truthful Sex, and which also starred Huntley Gordon. Meredith left acting following that film, working for a time as a model, eventually settling in Los Angeles, where she resided until her death on October 13, 1980.

== Partial filmography ==
- The Last Man on Earth (1924)
- Free to Love (1925)
- Darwin Was Right (1925)
- Blue Blood (1925)
- The Perfect Clown (1925)
- King of the Saddle (1926)
- The Count of Luxembourg (1926)
- The Truthful Sex (1926)
