= Napoleon's Barber =

1928 film directed by John Ford

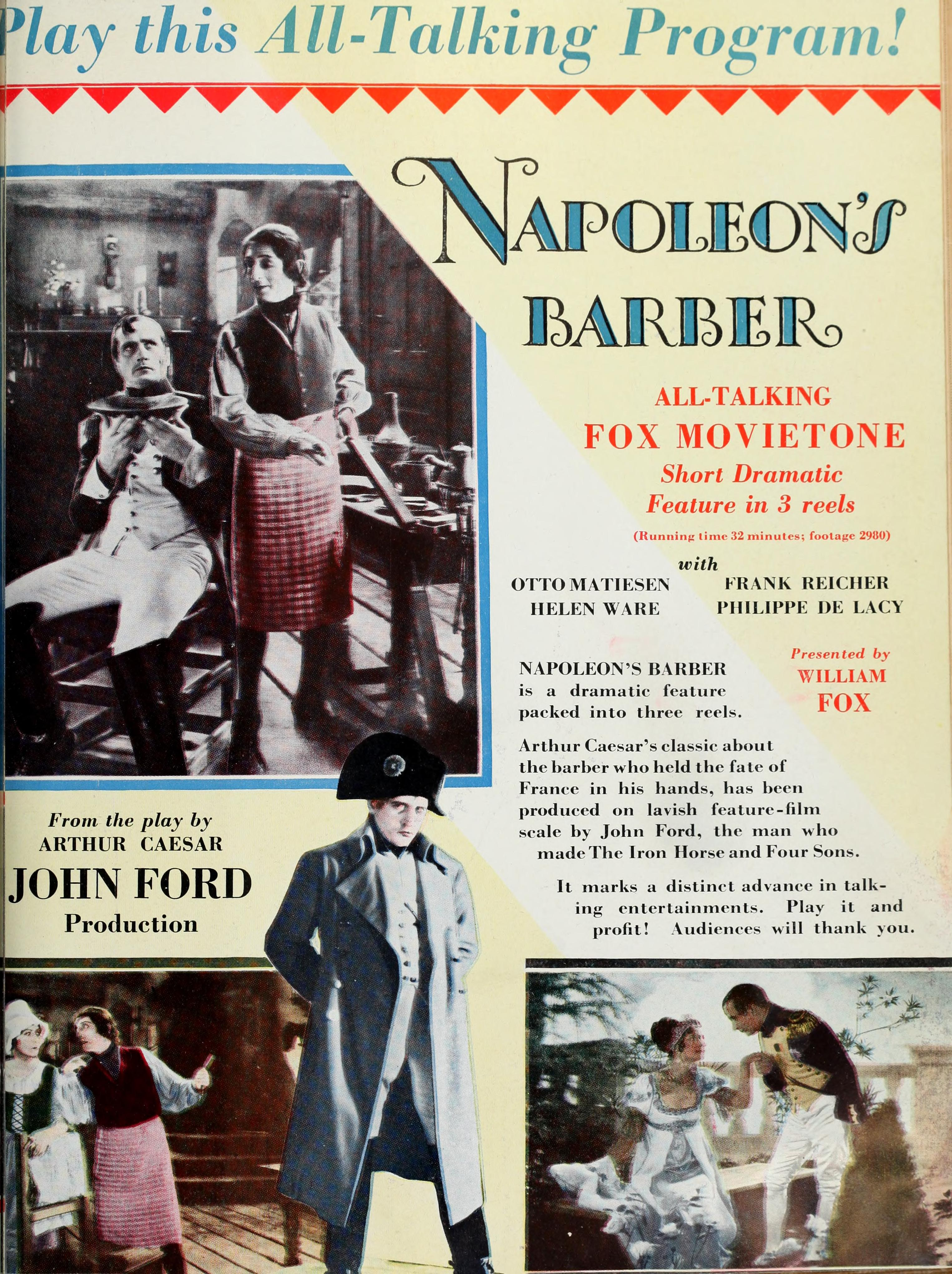
- Ad in The Film Daily
- Directed by: John Ford
- Written by: Arthur Caesar
- Starring: Otto Matieson; Natalie Golitzen
- Distributed by: Fox Film
- Release date: November 24, 1928
- Running time: 32 minutes
- Country: United States
- Language: English

Napoleon's Barber is a 1928 American featurette drama film directed by John Ford, and filmed in the Fox Movietone sound-on-film system. The film, Ford's first talkie, is now considered to be a lost film.

== Cast ==
- Otto Matieson as Napoleon
- Natalie Golitzen as Empress Josephine
- Frank Reicher as Napoleon's Barber
- Helen Ware as The Barber's Wife
- Philippe De Lacy as The Barber's Son
- D'Arcy Corrigan as Tailor
- Russ Powell as Blacksmith
- Michael Mark as Peasant
- Buddy Roosevelt as French Officer
- Ervin Renard as French Officer
- Youcca Troubetzkoy as French Officer
- Joseph Waddell as French Officer
- Henry Hebert as Soldier

== See also ==
- List of lost films
