= Siege (1925 film) =

1925 film

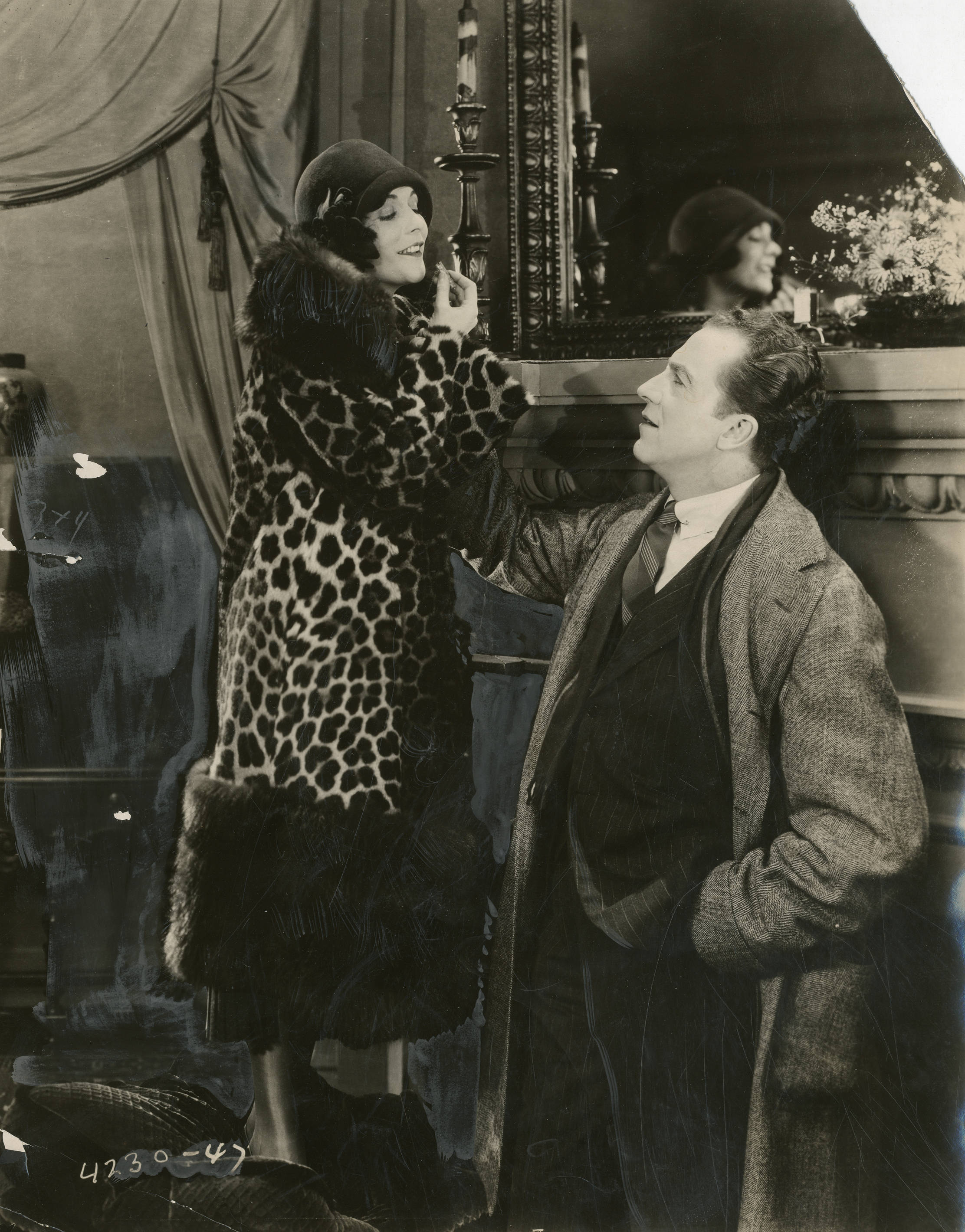
- Still with Valli and O'Brien
- Directed by: Svend Gade
- Written by: Harvey F. Thew
- Based on: Siege by Samuel Hopkins Adams
- Produced by: Carl Laemmle
- Starring: Virginia Valli; Eugene O'Brien; Mary Alden
- Cinematography: Charles J. Stumar
- Production company: Universal Pictures
- Distributed by: Universal Pictures
- Release date: June 15, 1925
- Running time: 70 minutes
- Country: United States
- Language: Silent (English intertitles)

Siege is a 1925 American silent drama film directed by Svend Gade and starring Virginia Valli, Eugene O'Brien, and Mary Alden.

== Plot ==
As described in a film magazine review, a strong willed woman rules over her relatives and the town with an iron hand. She is the owner of a large industrial plant. No one has ever dared to oppose her until her son Kenyon appears with his wife Frederika. The wife is a modern young woman and just as dominant a personality, and she refuses to be cowed by her mother-in-law. A misunderstanding develops, but she is reconciled to her husband, and eventually she breaks the proud spirit of the older woman.

== Cast ==
- Virginia Valli as Frederika
- Eugene O'Brien as Kenyon Ruyland
- Mary Alden as Aunt Augusta Ruyland
- Marc McDermott as Morval Ruyland
- Harry Lorraine as Dawley Cole
- Beatrice Burnham as Alberta Ruyland
- Helen Dunbar as Frederika's Mother
- Dorothy Seay as Dorothea

== Preservation ==
In February of 2021, Siege was cited by the National Film Preservation Board on their Lost U.S. Silent Feature Films list and is therefore presumed lost.

== Bibliography ==
- Langman, Larry. Destination Hollywood: The Influence of Europeans on American Filmmaking. McFarland, 2000. ISBN 0-7864-0681-X
