= King of the Saddle =

1926 film

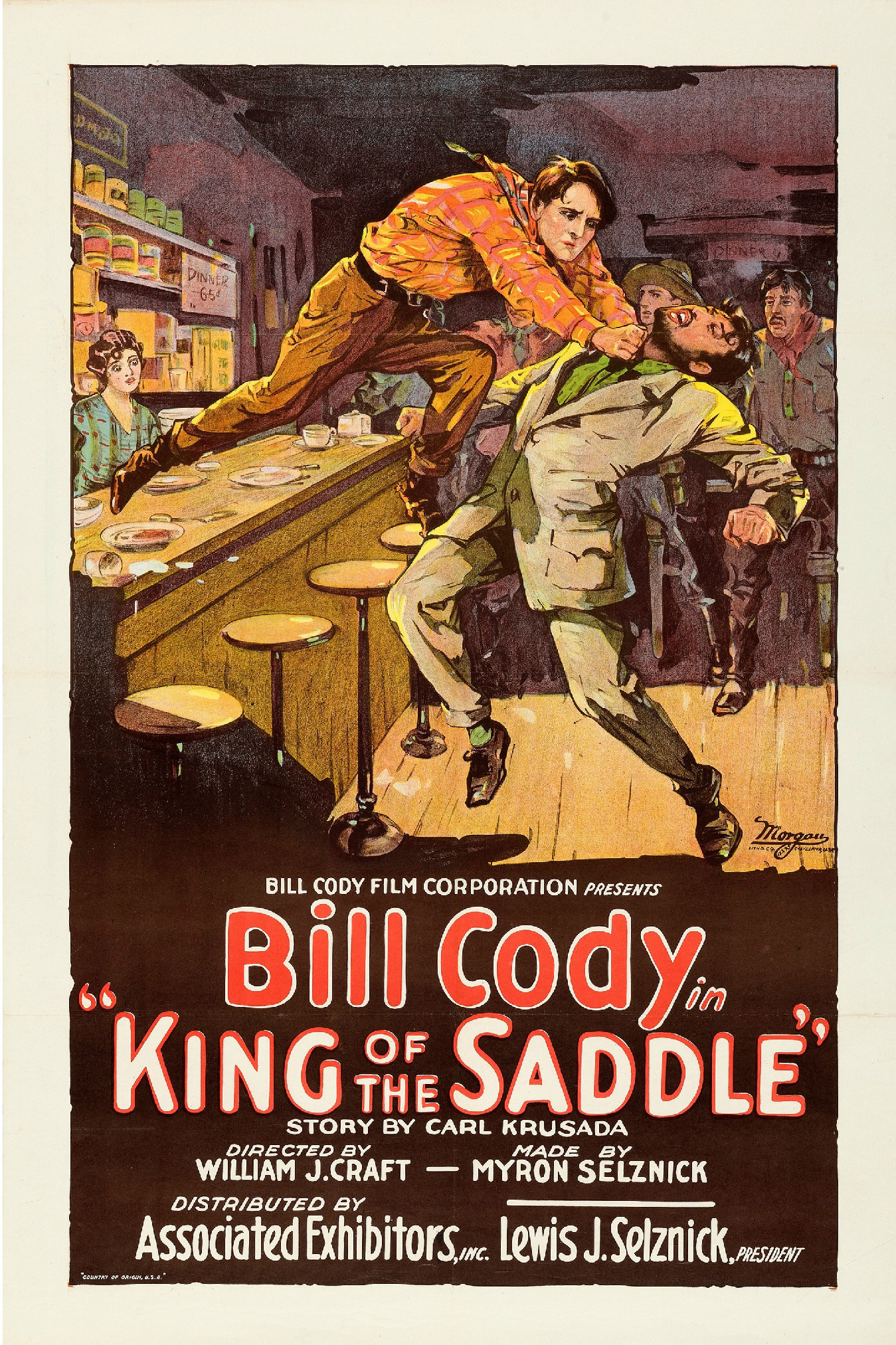
- Directed by: William James Craft
- Written by: Carl Krusada
- Produced by: Pat Powers; Myron Selznick
- Starring: Bill Cody; Joan Meredith; Billy Franey
- Production companies: Western Star Productions; Bill Cody Film Corporation
- Distributed by: Associated Exhibitors
- Release date: September 10, 1926
- Running time: 50 minutes
- Country: United States
- Languages: Silent; English intertitles

King of the Saddle is a 1926 American silent Western comedy film directed by William James Craft and starring Bill Cody, Joan Meredith and Billy Franey.

== Plot ==
Bill Cody portrays a cowboy who faces a crisis when he learns that his cattle are practically worthless due to the bankruptcy of a ranch owner. Unexpectedly, a stock certificate, previously deemed worthless, turns out to be the key to his salvation, bearing the name of a long-lost father of a waitress.

== Cast ==
- Bill Cody as Billy
- Joan Meredith as Mary
- Billy Franey as Nick
