= The Bandolero =

1924 film by Tom Terriss

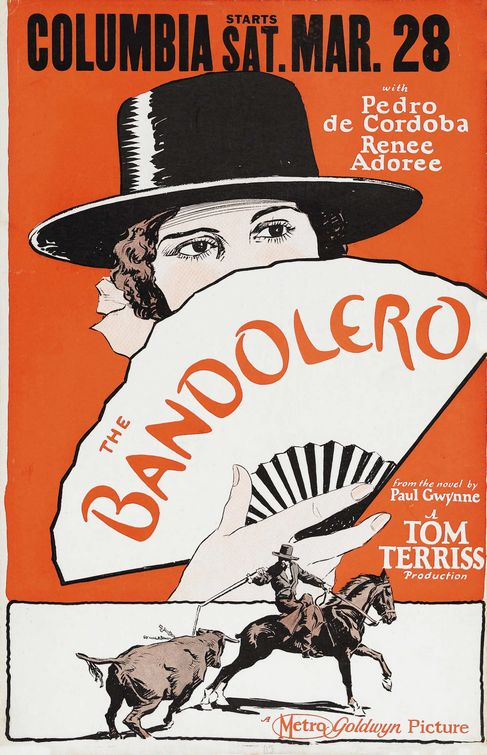
- Directed by: Tom Terriss
- Written by: Tom Terriss
- Based on: The Bandolero by Paul Gwynne
- Starring: Pedro de Cordoba; Gustav von Seyffertitz; Renée Adorée
- Cinematography: George Peters
- Edited by: Don Bartlett; Winchell Smith
- Distributed by: Metro-Goldwyn-Mayer
- Release date: October 20, 1924
- Running time: 80 minutes
- Country: United States
- Language: Silent (English intertitles)

The Bandolero is a lost 1924 American drama film starring Pedro de Cordoba, Gustav von Seyffertitz, and Renée Adorée and directed by Tom Terriss. The screenplay is by Tom Terriss based on a novel by Paul Gwynne.

== Synopsis ==
Manuel Granado rediscovers a son he thought had died years before to see him engaged to the daughter of the bandit who had kidnapped the son and turned him into a matador.

== Cast ==
- Pedro de Cordoba as Dorando (The Bandolero)
- Gustav von Seyffertitz as Marques de Bazan
- Renée Adorée as Petra
- Gordon Begg as Padre Domingo
- Paul Ellis as Ramon
- Arthur Donaldson as Juan
- José de Rueda as El Tuerte
- Dorothy Rush – Concha
- Marie Valray – Maria
- Manuel Renaldo Granado
