= The Truthful Sex =

1926 film

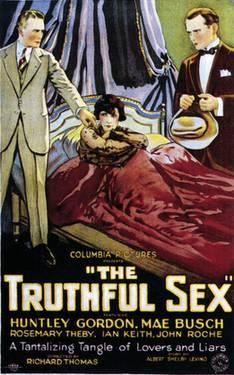
- Directed by: Richard Thomas
- Written by: Albert S. Le Vino
- Produced by: Harry Cohn
- Starring: Mae Busch; Huntley Gordon; Ian Keith
- Cinematography: H. Lyman Broening; Herman Schopp
- Production company: Columbia Pictures
- Distributed by: Columbia Pictures
- Release date: November 20, 1926
- Running time: 58 minutes
- Country: United States
- Language: Silent (English intertitles)

The Truthful Sex is a 1926 American silent comedy drama film directed by Richard Thomas and starring Mae Busch, Huntley Gordon, and Ian Keith. A couple's successful relationship suffers strains following the birth of their first son.

== Plot ==
As described in a film magazine review, an engaged couple are out shopping for furniture and Ally, the prospective bride, blushes and tries to hide her embarrassment as she insists that they will have a single instead of twin beds. Soon their honeymoon comes and the couple share some intimate moments. Then comes the stormy married life, and an intertitle notes that, after 365 quarrels, a baby arrives and provides new opportunities for scrapes. Neither Sally nor her husband Robert Mapes want to get up when the baby cries at night. Soon Tom Barnes, a butler and his accomplice maid come to assist the household. Sally steps out with an old friend and Robert goes to the club. Sally's jewels entice the burglars and, while she is out, Barnes goes through the house. The wife and her escort return home and he pleads with her to elope with him. She consents and gives him her jewels to keep. When she is absent, Barnes as a stickup man and demands the jewels. The maid appears and begs Barnes to go straight. He weakens under her gaze. When Sally returns, she decides that she will stick with her husband. When Robert comes home, they embrace.

== Cast ==
- Mae Busch as Sally Carey Mapes
- Huntley Gordon as Robert Mapes
- Ian Keith as Tom Barnes
- Leo White as Paul Gregg
- Billy Kent Schaefer as Robert Mapes, Junior
- John Roche
- Rosemary Theby as Jennie
- Richard Travers
- Joan Meredith

== Preservation ==
With no prints of The Truthful Sex located in any film archives, it is a lost film.

== Bibliography ==
- Munden, Kenneth White. The American Film Institute Catalog of Motion Pictures Produced in the United States, Part 1. University of California Press, 1997.
