= Charros, gauchos y manolas =

1930 film

- Directed by: Xavier Cugat
- Produced by: Rodolfo Montes for Hollywood Spanish Pictures
- Starring: Romualdo Tirado; Martin Garralaga; Maria Alba; Paul Ellis; Delia Magaña; José 'Pepet' Peña; Samuel Pedraza; Marina Ortiz; Fernando Arvide Llamas
- Music by: Xavier Cugat
- Release date: 15 March 1930
- Running time: 91 minutes
- Country: United States
- Language: Spanish

Charros, gauchos y manolas is a Spanish-language musical produced by Hollywood Spanish Pictures in 1930 and directed by Xavier Cugat.

== Plot ==
A bohemian painter, spurred by a magazine contest, creates a series of watercolor paintings of Spanish and South American cultural subjects. One by one, they come to life.

== Cast ==
- Carmen Castillo as Mexican artist
- Samuel Pedraza as Mexican artist
- Paul Ellis as Argentinian artist
- Vicente Padula as Argentinian artist
- Maria Alba as Spanish artist
- Martin Garralaga as Spanish artist
- Marina Ortiz as Spanish artist
- José Peña as Spanish artist (as Pepet)
- Romualdo Tirado as Master of Ceremonies
- Delia Magaña as Mexican artist
- Carlos Gómez Don Chema as Mexican artist
- Carmen Granada as Argentinian artist
- Carlos Lucanti as Argentinian artist
