= Reginald Simpson =

British stage actor and playwright (1896–1964)

- Born: 1896; England, United Kingdom
- Died: 2 November 1964 (aged 67–68); Windsor, Berkshire; United Kingdom
- Other name: George Reginald Simpson
- Occupations: Actor, Playwright
- Years active: 1925–1959 (film)

Reginald Simpson (1896–1964) was a British stage actor and playwright. He moved to Hollywood where he appeared in around seventy films in a mixture of supporting and minor roles.

== Selected filmography ==
- Wallflowers (1928)
- The Honor of the Press (1932)
- Bird of Paradise (1932)
- Kiss of Araby (1933)
- I Believed in You (1934)
- Fifteen Maiden Lane (1936)
- Find the Witness (1937)
- The Law and Jake Wade (1958)

== Bibliography ==
- Mycroft, Walter. Walter C. Mycroft, the Time of My Life: The Memoirs of a British Film Producer. Scarecrow Press, 2006.
