= Vanity (1927 film) =

1927 film

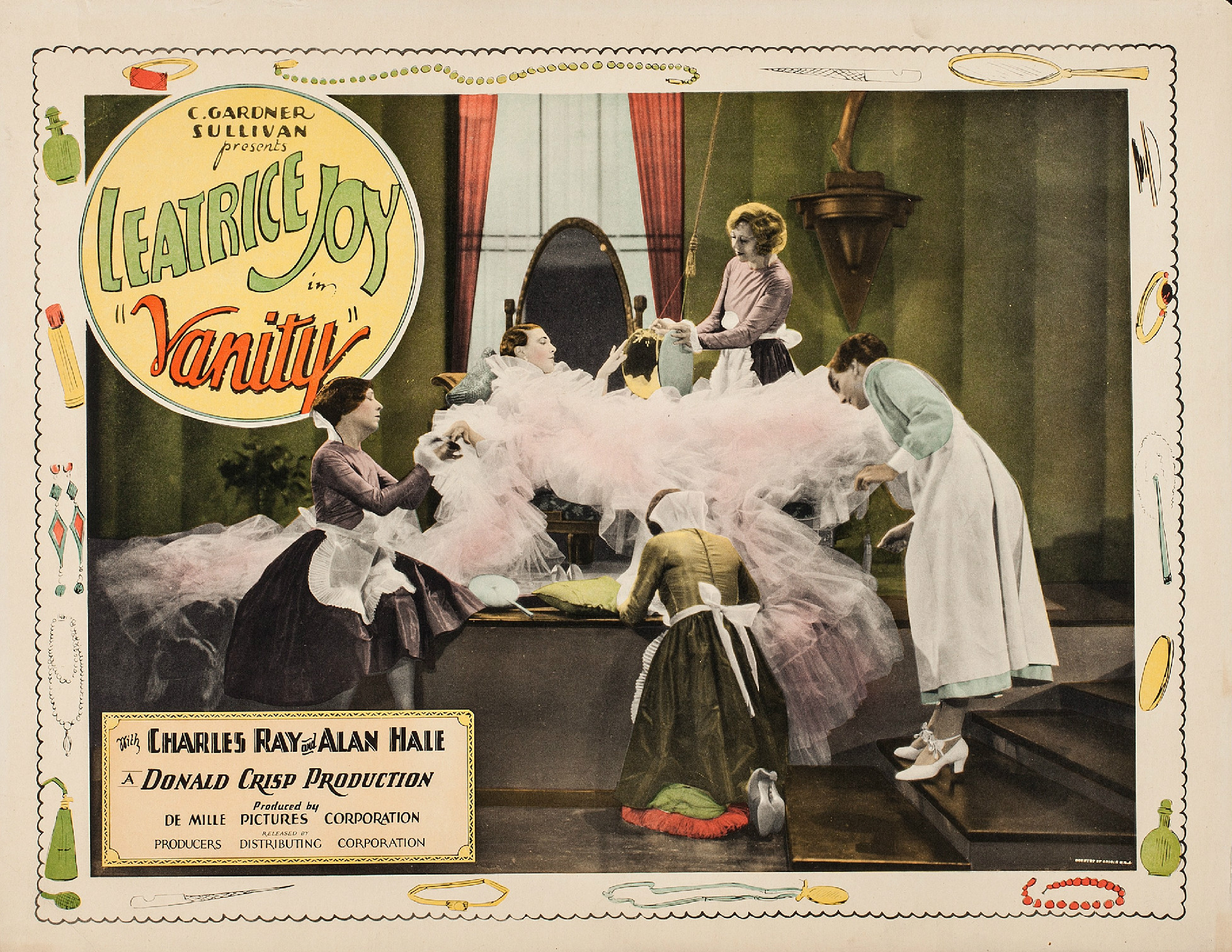
- Film poster
- Directed by: Donald Crisp
- Written by: Douglas Doty (adaptation); John Krafft (intertitles)
- Screenplay by: Douglas Doty
- Produced by: Cecil B. DeMille
- Starring: Leatrice Joy
- Cinematography: Arthur C. Miller
- Edited by: Barbara Hunter
- Distributed by: Producers Distributing Corporation
- Release date: May 9, 1927
- Running time: 60 minutes
- Country: United States
- Language: Silent (English intertitles)

Vanity is a 1927, American silent drama film directed by Donald Crisp and starring Leatrice Joy. The film was written by Douglas Doty, produced by DeMille Pictures Corporation and distributed by Producers Distributing Corporation.

== Cast ==
- Leatrice Joy as Barbara Fiske
- Charles Ray as Lt. Lloyd Van Courtland
- Alan Hale as 'Happy' Dan Morgan
- Mayme Kelso as Mrs. Fiske
- Noble Johnson as Bimbo, ship's cook
- Helen Lee Worthing as Tess Ramsay
- Louis Payne as Butler

== Production ==
Leatrice Joy had impulsively cut her hair short in 1926, and Cecil B. DeMille, whom Joy had followed when he set up Producers Distributing Corporation, was publicly angry as it prevented her from portraying traditional feminine roles. The studio developed projects with roles suitable for her “Leatrice Joy bob”, and Vanity was the final of five films shot before she regrew her hair. Despite this, a professional dispute would end the Joy / Demille partnership in 1928.

== Preservation ==
A copy of Vanity is held by The Library of Congress. Edward Lorusso produced a restoration of the film on DVD and Blu-ray of the film in 2024 with a score by David Drazin. The Library of Congress copy was missing the final reel, but a damaged 16mm print of the final reel was found.
