= Wallflowers (film) =

1928 film

- Directed by: James Leo Meehan
- Screenplay by: Dorothy Yost
- Based on: Wallflowers by Temple Bailey
- Starring: Hugh Trevor; Mabel Julienne Scott; Charles A. Stevenson; Jean Arthur; Lola Todd; Tempe Pigott
- Cinematography: Allen G. Siegler
- Edited by: Edward Schroeder
- Production company: Film Booking Offices of America
- Distributed by: Film Booking Offices of America
- Release date: February 16, 1928
- Running time: 70 minutes
- Country: United States
- Language: English

Wallflowers is a 1928 American drama film directed by James Leo Meehan and written by Dorothy Yost. It is based on the 1927 novel Wallflowers by Temple Bailey. The film stars Hugh Trevor, Mabel Julienne Scott, Charles A. Stevenson, Jean Arthur, Lola Todd and Tempe Pigott. The film was released on February 16, 1928, by Film Booking Offices of America.

== Cast ==
- Hugh Trevor as Rufus
- Mabel Julienne Scott as Sherry
- Charles A. Stevenson as Mr. Fisk
- Jean Arthur as Sandra
- Lola Todd as Theodora
- Tempe Pigott as Mrs. Claybourne
- Crauford Kent as Maulsby
- Reginald Simpson as Markaham
