= Helen Lee Worthing =

American actress

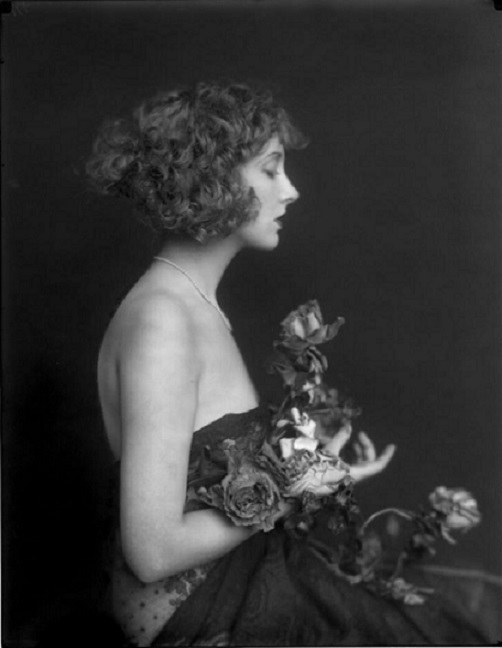
- Worthing circa 1922
- Born: January 31, 1905; Brookline, Massachusetts, U.S.
- Died: August 25, 1948 (aged 43); Los Angeles, California, U.S.
- Occupation: Actress
- Spouse(s): Jack McDonald (1921-1922, divorce); Dr. Eugene Nelson (1927-1932, annulment)

Helen Lee Worthing (1905 - 1948) was an American actress, mostly active in the era of silent film.

== Early years ==
The daughter of a prominent businessman in Boston, Worthing was born in Brookline, Massachusetts. As a teenager, she received a prize for having the most perfect hands and arms in Louisville, Kentucky. Two years after that recognition, judges unanimously selected her as "the most beautiful woman in America" in a contest that had 10,000 entrants.

== Career ==
Worthing's most significant Broadway involvement came during the 1920s, a period often referred to as the Jazz Age, which was marked by its vibrant and rapidly evolving entertainment scene. This era, particularly known for its lavish musicals and extravagant theatrical productions, provided a perfect backdrop for Worthing's talents to flourish.

Worthing's professional acting debut came in What's in a Name?, soon after which she played in The Greenwich Village Follies of 1920 in New York. Following that production, she went to England to appear as "America's most Representative show girl" in a revue. She also performed in the 1921, 1922, and 1923 editions of Ziegfeld Follies.

Aside from her theatrical work, Helen Lee Worthing also made inroads into the film industry, participating in the silent film era. However, her film career did not achieve the same level of prominence as her stage work, and she is most fondly remembered for her contributions to Broadway.

Worthing's films included Janice Meredith, The Swan, Don Juan, Night Life of New York, Flower of the Night, Vanity, and Thumbs Down.

== Personal life ==
Worthing married businessman Jack McDonald in 1921, and they divorced in 1922. (Another source indicates that she secretly married McDonald in 1917.) In April 1922, she was treated at a hospital after taking poison that, according to her maid, she thought was headache tablets. A contemporary news report, however, said that friends described her as despondent and that a policeman said, "she stated she took poison because she was sick of living." She also said that, after falling in love again, she had learned that her unidentified lover planned to marry another woman.

A newspaper account states that Worthing had a violent physical altercation with Edna Wheaton, a fellow performer, in the dressing room during a performance of the Ziegfeld Midnight Frolic in April 1922. Worthing was allegedly enraged when Wheaton insulted her boyfriend. "Stage ladies just can't help losing their tempers sometime," said Wheaton, downplaying the incident. "We have many annoying things which the public never knows."

In April 1927, Worthing was attacked in her home. The Los Angeles Times reported that her maid found her unconscious, "lying in a pool of blood, her nose broken, eyes discolored, one tooth knocked out and bruised about the body." Her physician was Dr. Eugene Nelson, and a romantic relationship developed between doctor and patient.

In June 1927 Nelson and Worthing married, which led to ostracism for her because he was African-American. When the couple emerged from a limousine for the opening of a play, the crowd greeted them rudely, and the reaction inside the theater was also unfriendly. Worthing later recalled "the ordeal of that night" as people she thought were friends treated her coldly. Before the marriage was two months old, Worthing entered voluntary bankruptcy, citing assets of $680 and liabilities of $19,086.62. She sought relief from her troubles via use of alcohol and drugs, and her relationship with Nelson grew sour until she filed for divorce, which was granted on May 26, 1932.

While he awaited the outcome of the divorce hearing, Nelson sought an annulment on the grounds that the couple had not met Mexican requirements for a marriage prior to their wedding in Tijuana. He continued to plead his case after the divorce, and in January 1933 Worthing consented to a court order to have the divorce decree vacated and replaced by an annulment. During the hearing, Worthing interrupted her attorney's statement opposing the annulment to tell the court, "I have confidence in the doctor. I say, let him have the marriage annulled."

Worthing disappeared briefly in 1933 after she boarded a train in Los Angeles on June 15 to travel to Chicago and New York. Nelson reported her missing, and police could not find her, even after two people reported having seen her in Pasadena. Reappearing on June 19, she said that Nelson had asked her to marry him again, but he changed his mind and told her that she needed to go. She explained that she left the train in Pasadena because she didn't want to be sent away.

== Legal problems ==
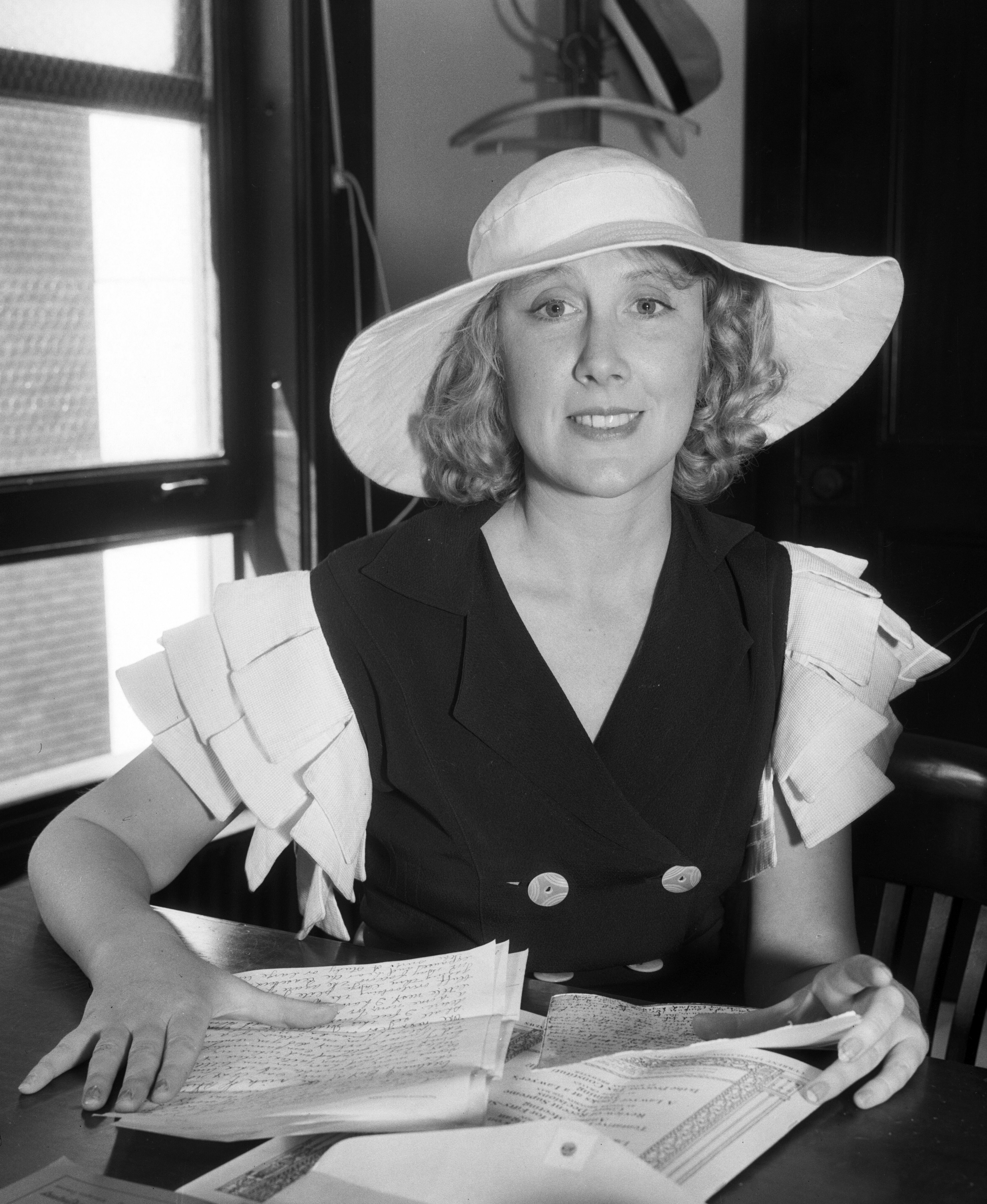
Worthing in 1933

A few months after the marriage ended, Nelson complained to the court that Worthing was spending his $12,000 alimony payment on narcotics. Subsequently, she faced a court hearing on an insanity complaint by a friend who cited the actress's hallucinations and threats of suicide. Psychiatrists' testimony led the judge to commit her to a sanitarium, and that confinement was followed by a parole.

Worthing was arrested in August 1933 when she was found using narcotics (a violation of her parole) in a Los Angeles apartment where she was living under as assumed name. In 1935, an arrest for public drunkenness in Ocean Park, California, led to her spending a night in jail before she was fined $5 and given a suspended 10-day jail sentence and one year's probation. More trouble arose in September 1939 when Worthing received a five-month sentence in the Los Angeles County jail for forging a narcotic prescription. Less than a year later, she surrendered to authorities, admitting additional forging of prescriptions for narcotics.

== Death ==
On August 25, 1948, Worthing died of barbiturate poisoning in a three-room house on a back lot in Hollywood, where she lived with a 39-year-old Filipino man. Scrapbooks filled with clippings of news stories that reported her successes and failures were found beside the bed in which she died. She was buried in Inglewood Park Memorial Cemetery.

== Filmography ==
- Enemies of Women (1923)
- Janice Meredith (1924)
- The Other Woman's Story (1925)
- The Swan (1925)
- The Crowded Hour (1925)
- Flower of Night (1925)
- Night Life of New York (1925)
- Lew Tyler's Wives (1926)
- The Count of Luxembourg (1926)
- Watch Your Wife (1926)
- Don Juan (1926)
- Vanity (1927)
- Thumbs Down (1927)
