= The Crowded Hour =

1925 film by E. Mason Hopper

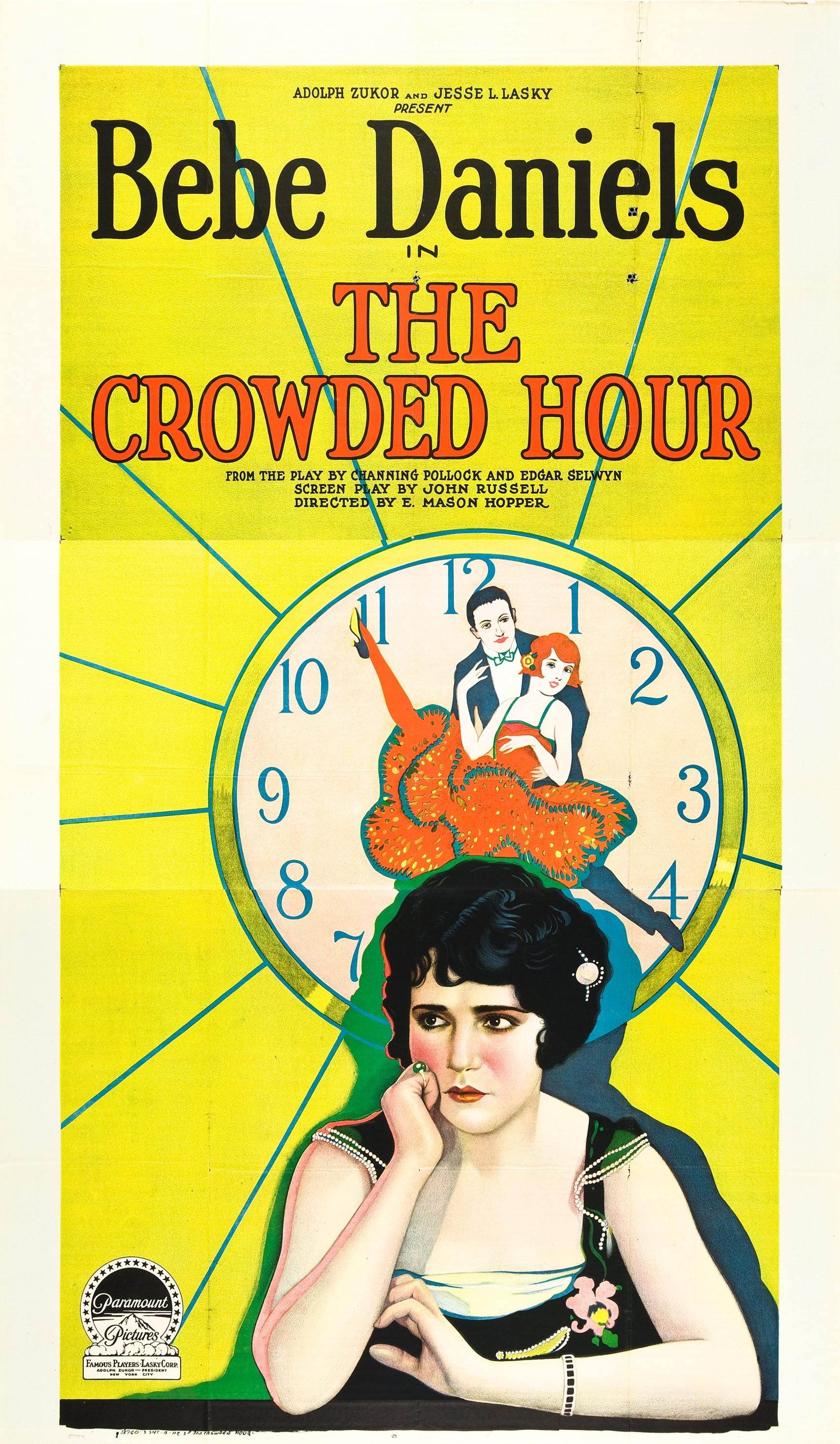
- Film Poster
- Directed by: E. Mason Hopper
- Written by: John Russell (scenario)
- Based on: The Crowded Hour by Channing Pollock and Edgar Selwyn
- Produced by: Adolph Zukor; Jesse Lasky
- Starring: Bebe Daniels; Kenneth Harlan
- Cinematography: J. Roy Hunt
- Distributed by: Paramount Pictures
- Release date: April 20, 1925
- Running time: 70 minutes; 7 reels
- Country: United States
- Language: Silent (English intertitles)

The Crowded Hour is a 1925 American silent drama film directed by E. Mason Hopper and starring Bebe Daniels. It was produced by Famous Players–Lasky and distributed by Paramount Pictures. It is based on the 1918 Broadway play, The Crowded Hour, by Channing Pollock and Edgar Selwyn.

== Plot ==
As described in a film magazine review, Peggy and her pal Matt Wilde are performers in a "Follies" act when Billy Laidlaw sees her and falls in love with her despite the fact that he is already married. When World War I comes, Peggy and her partner become "Y" entertainers in France where she meets Billy. Billy later starts for an ammunition dump, planning to destroy it before the Germans reach it. Peggy is working as a switchboard operator when she finds it a question of saving Billy or a platoon of French soldiers, she chooses the latter. Billy is then captured. Peggy is later blinded during an attack, and then discovers that her nurse is Billy's wife Grace. Peggy stoically resolves to forget Billy and make amends with her partner Matt.

== Cast ==
- Bebe Daniels as Peggy Laurence
- Kenneth Harlan as Billy Laidlaw
- T. Roy Barnes as Matt Wilde
- Frank Morgan as Bert Caswell
- Helen Lee Worthing as Grace Laidlaw
- Armand Cortes as Captain Soulier (credited as Armand Cortez)
- Alice Chapin as Grand'Mere Buvasse
- Warner Richmond as Operator

== Preservation ==
With no prints of The Crowded Hour located in any film archives, it is a lost film.

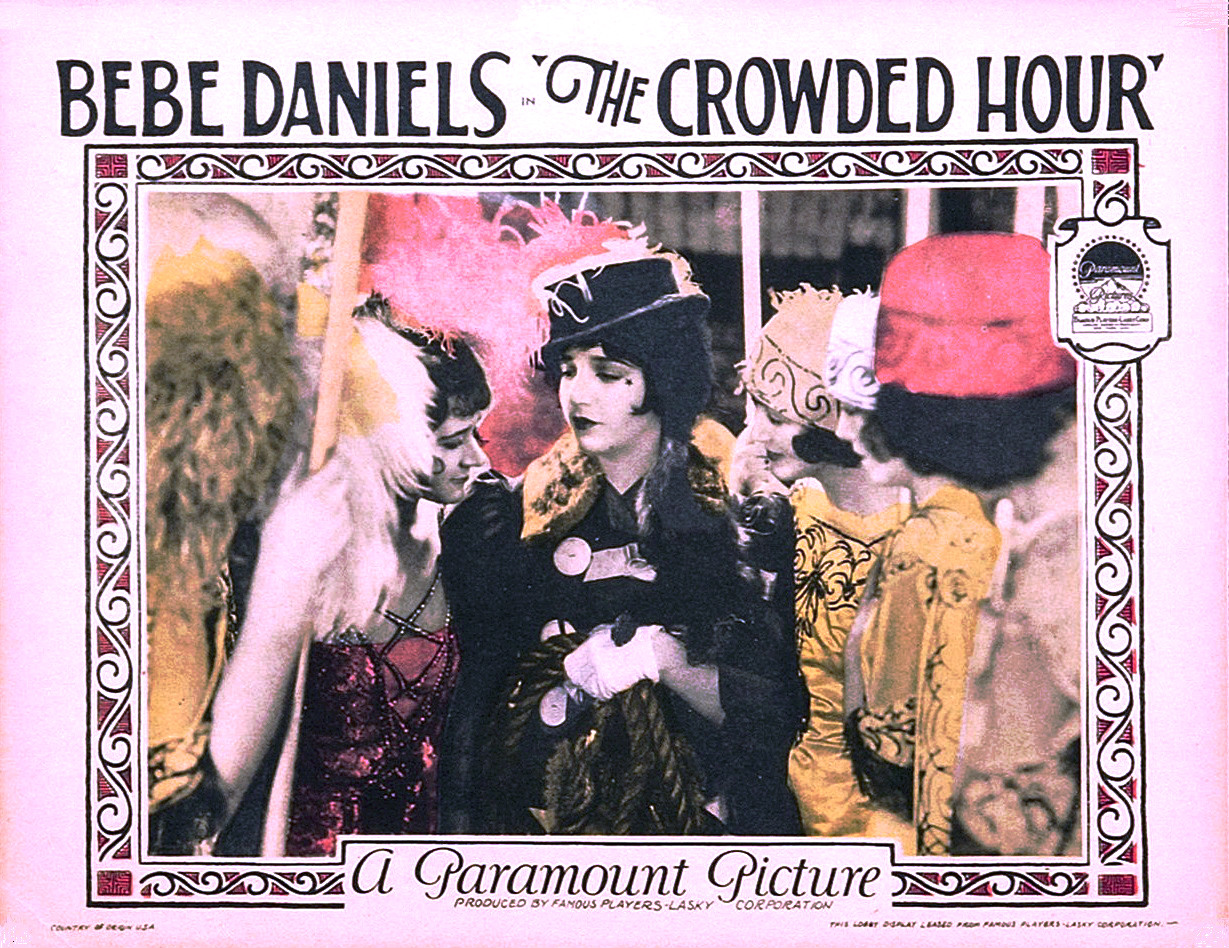
Lobby Card of the film
