= Kiss of Araby =

1933 film

- Directed by: Phil Rosen
- Written by: Edward Sinclair; F. McGrew Willis
- Produced by: Walter Freuler; Burton L. King; Edward Manson
- Starring: Maria Alba; Walter Byron; Claire Windsor
- Cinematography: Edward A. Kull
- Edited by: Fred Bain
- Production company: Monarch Productions
- Distributed by: Monarch Film Corporation
- Release date: April 21, 1933
- Running time: 70 minutes
- Country: United States
- Language: English

Kiss of Araby is a 1933 American pre-Code adventure film directed by Phil Rosen and starring Maria Alba, Walter Byron and Claire Windsor. It is an action melodrama set in the Middle East.

== Plot ==
A British Army officer is forced to resign his commission, and joins forces in the desert with a local Arab leader against his own former comrades.

== Cast ==
- Maria Alba as Dolores Mendez
- Walter Byron as Lt. W. B. Lawrence
- Claire Windsor as Mrs. Courtney
- Theodore von Eltz as Capt. J.G. Randall
- Claude King as Maj. J.W. Courtney
- Frank Leigh as Sheik El Rahman
- Edmund Cobb as Taleb
- Carlotta Monti as Dancer
- Alfred Cross as Lt. Snell
- Reginald Simpson as Lt. Matthews

== Bibliography ==
- Pitts, Michael R. Poverty Row Studios, 1929-1940. McFarland & Company, 2005.
