= The Count of Luxembourg =

Operetta by Franz Lehár

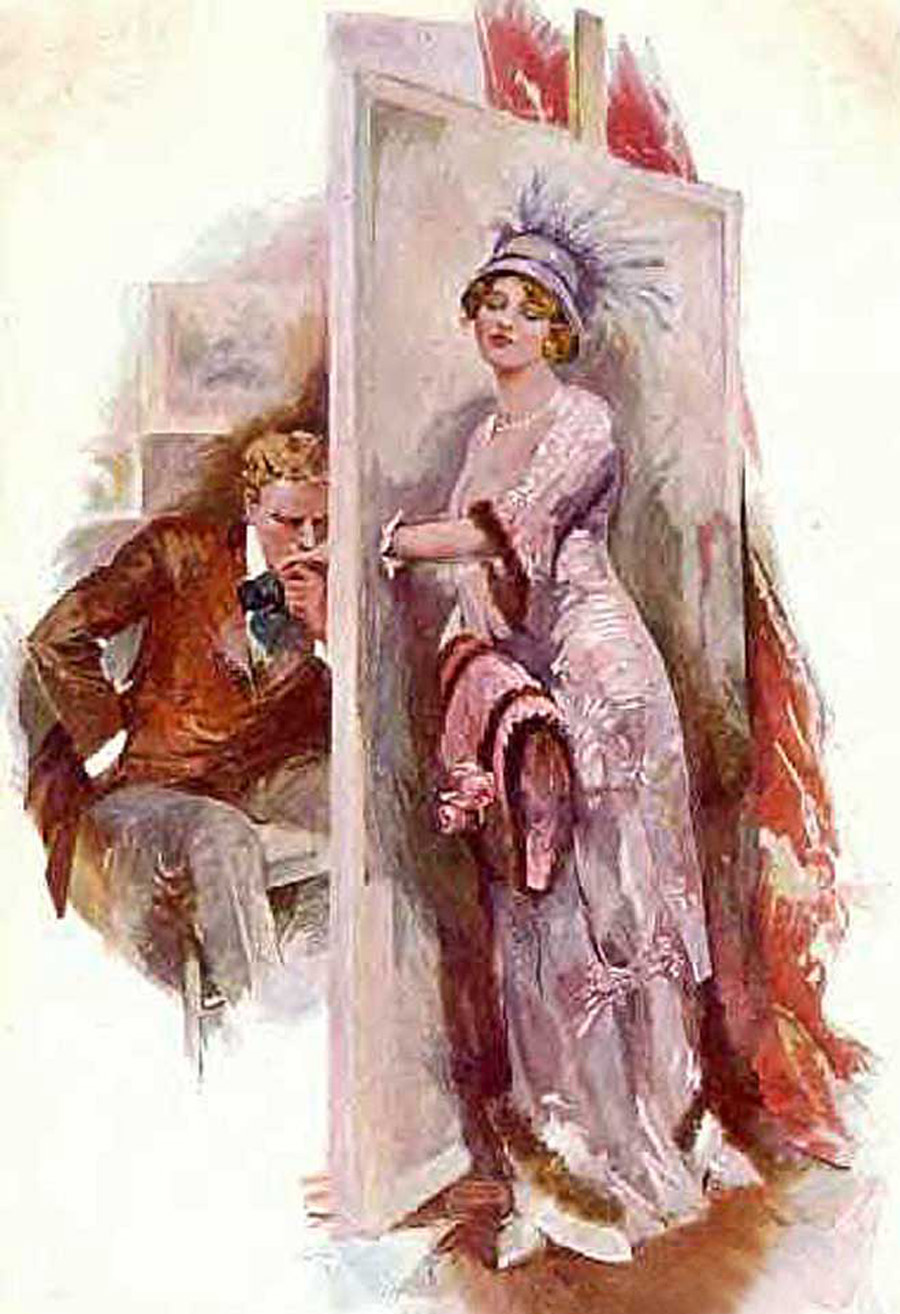
Drawing of Wallis and Elsie

The Count of Luxembourg is an operetta in two acts with English lyrics and libretto by Basil Hood and Adrian Ross, music by Franz Lehár, based on Lehár's three-act German operetta Der Graf von Luxemburg which had premiered in Vienna in 1909. Lehár made amendments to his Viennese score to accommodate the two-act adaptation. He also interpolated into the score three new pieces: a waltz that he had written for a commemorative performance of Der Graf in Vienna; a song from his first operetta, Wiener Frauen; and a Russian dance from the opera Tatjana.

The original production opened at Daly's Theatre in London in 1911 and ran for 345 performances, starring Lily Elsie, Huntley Wright, W. H. Berry and Bertram Wallis. It was followed by a UK tour and also had a good run at the New Amsterdam Theatre in New York in 1912 with the libretto further adapted by Glen MacDonaugh. It played in Australia in 1913. Adaptations included a 1967 BBC television production and an American silent film version made in 1926. A new English language adaptation of Der Graf von Luxemburg, more closely following the original score and libretto, was produced under the name The Count of Luxembourg and recorded by New Sadler's Wells Opera in 1983 and toured by the D'Oyly Carte Opera Company in 1997.

== Synopsis ==
The Grand Duke Rutzinov may not marry Angèle, an opera singer with whom he is infatuated, unless she bears a title. He therefore arranges for the penniless bohemian spendthrift Count René to marry a lady whose face he is not to see, and to agree to a divorce in three months. For this the Count receives the sum of £20,000 (half a million francs). As she will then bear a title, Rutzinov can then marry her. At the wedding ceremony, at the studio of Rutzinov's artist friend Brissard, the Count and his mystery bride are separated by a canvas – but when they touch hands to exchange the rings, they fall in love.

Months later, Angèle gives a party, which the Count attends. They are immediately attracted to each other, but not knowing that they are already husband and wife, they believe their romance is hopeless. To prevent things from going further, Rutzinov announces his engagement to Angèle. But Brissard notes that the Count has not yet divorced and reveals that the two are still married. Secretly delighted, Angèle denounces the Count's act in marrying for money. The Count storms off angrily. Meanwhile, Rutzinov decides to marry a Russian countess instead, and the Count comes into some money, which he uses to pay Rutzinov back the £20,000. But he is miserable without Angèle and eventually tells her that he loves her. All ends happily.

Hood wrote about rewriting the libretto of the operetta for British audiences:

"...there are not, I think, thirty lines of dialogue in the English adaptation which are actually translated from the German; the action of the play has been constructed in two acts, instead of the original three; while the entire part of Brissard, played by Mr. W. H. Berry, has been invented and introduced, and, as a consequence, new situations and scenes have arisen which do not exist in the original play. Three of four minor characters also have been created to help the construction of the new effects, such as the opening of Act I, and the dialogue scene towards the end of Act II, where Angele and the Count each discovers the identity of the other, through the jealous interference of Monsieur de Tresac. This particular episode was in the original treated musically, with a full stage, being the subject of the Finale of Act II; and in doing away with the third act it became necessary, of course, to sacrifice this Finale and to approach and develop the dramatic moments of the recognition by different methods, in spoken dialogue...."

== Roles and original London cast ==
Wallis and Elsie

- Count René of Luxembourg – Bertram Wallis
- Registrar – Fred Kaye
- Jean Baptiste (a Waiter) – Willie Warde
- Mons. De Trésac – Alec Fraser
- Mons. De Valmont – Paul Plunket
- Pelegrin, Mentschikoff and Paulovitch (the Grand Duke's attendants) – Frank Perfitt, Ridgwell Cullum, Charles Coleman
- Lavigne, Boulanger (Artists) – Gervais Whitehead, Garnet Wilson
- Brissard (an Artist) – W. H. Berry
- The Grand Duke Rutzinov – Huntley Wright
- Juliette (a Model) – May de Sousa
- Countess Kokozeff – Gladys Homfrey
- Mimi – May Marton
- Lisette (Maid to Angèle) – Kitty Hanson
- Angèle Didier – Lily Elsie

== Musical numbers ==
Act I – Brissard's Studio, Paris

- No. 1 – "Carnival! Make the most of Carnival!" – Chorus
- No. 2 – "Bohemia" – Brissard and Chorus
- No. 3 – "Pierrot and Pierrette" – Juliette and Chorus
- No. 4 – "Carnival! Make the most of Carnival!" – Chorus and René
- No. 4a – First Exit – "So lend it, spend it, end it, and out of the window send it"
- No. 4b – Second Exit – "So lend it, spend it, end it..."
- No. 5 – "A Carnival for life" – Juliette and Brissard
- No. 6 – "I am in love" – Grand Duke and Attendants
- No. 7 – "Love, goodbye" – Angèle
- No. 8 – "Cousins of the Czar" – Angèle and Grand Duke
- No. 9 – "Twenty thousand pounds" – René, Grand Duke and Attendants
- No. 10 – Finale – "Fair Countess, may I wish that now you'll be happy for ever?"

Act II – Reception Hall at the Grand Duke Rutzinov's, Paris

- No. 11 – Opening Scene and Dance
- No. 12 – "Hail, Angèle" – Chorus and Angèle
- No. 12a – Fanfare
- No. 12b – Stage Music
- No. 13 – "Pretty butterfly" – Grand Duke
- No. 14 – "Her glove" – René
- No. 15 – "In society" – Juliette and Brissard
- No. 16 – "Love breaks every bond" – Angèle and René
- No. 17 – Russian Dance – "Kukuska"
- No. 18 – "Rootsie-pootsie"– Grand Duke and Girls
- No. 19 – "Are you going to dance?" – Angèle and René
- No. 20 – "Boys" – Juliette, Mimi, Grand Duke, Brissard and Girls
- No. 21 – Finale – Angèle and René – "Say not love is a dream"

== Productions and adaptations ==
The Count of Luxembourg opened at Daly's Theatre in London on 20 May 1911 and ran for a successful 345 performances, starring Lily Elsie, Huntley Wright, W. H. Berry and Bertram Wallis. The opening night was conducted by Lehár and attended by King George V and Queen Mary. The Times particularly praised the singing and dancing of Elsie and Wallis, as well as Lehár's music, though the paper judged the story to be thin and improbable. It was followed by a UK tour starring Eric Thorne, Robert Michaelis, Lauri de Frece and Daisy Burrell, and it also had a good run at the New Amsterdam Theatre in New York in 1912 with the libretto further adapted by Glen MacDonaugh. It played in Australia in 1913. There was a Broadway revival in 1930. A new English language stage version of Der Graf von Luxemburg, more closely following the original score and libretto, was produced under the name The Count of Luxembourg and recorded by New Sadler's Wells Opera in 1983. This version was revived on tour by the D'Oyly Carte Opera Company in 1997.

An American silent film adaptation was made in 1926. In 1967, the BBC broadcast their own television production by Cedric Messina, conducted by David Lloyd-Jones, with Nigel Douglas and Adele Leigh in principal roles. A 2005 production updated "to Carnival time in drab 1950s Vienna" at the Theater an der Wien starring Juliane Banse and Bo Skovhus was issued by cpo (CPO 777 194-2 DVD) in 2007.
