= Night Life of New York =

1925 film by Allan Dwan

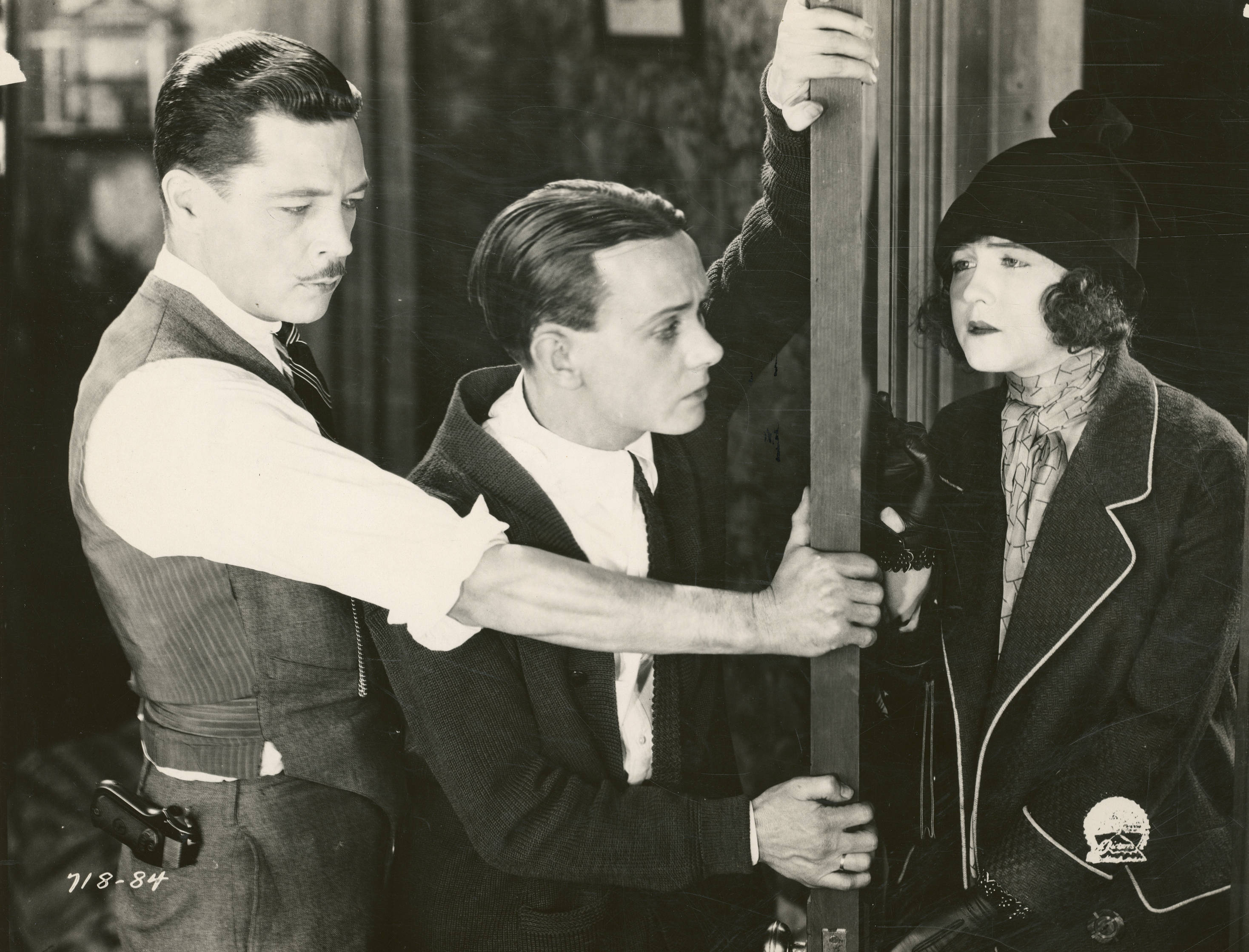
- Film still
- Directed by: Allan Dwan
- Screenplay by: Paul Schofield; Edgar Selwyn
- Produced by: Jesse L. Lasky; Adolph Zukor
- Starring: Rod La Rocque; Ernest Torrence; Dorothy Gish; Helen Lee Worthing; George Hackathorne; Arthur Housman
- Cinematography: George Webber
- Production company: Famous Players–Lasky Corporation
- Distributed by: Paramount Pictures
- Release date: August 3, 1925
- Running time: 80 minutes
- Country: United States
- Language: Silent (English intertitles)

Night Life of New York is a 1925 American silent comedy film directed by Allan Dwan and written by Paul Schofield and Edgar Selwyn. The film stars Rod La Rocque, Ernest Torrence, Dorothy Gish, Helen Lee Worthing, George Hackathorne, and Arthur Housman. The film was released on August 3, 1925, by Paramount Pictures.

== Plot ==
As described in a film magazine reviews, discouraged with his ne’er do well son, Ronald, John Bentley consents to a plot to send him to New York City where it is planned to get him into as much trouble as possible so that he will soon want to leave the metropolis. Ronald gets mixed up in a jewel robbery, fights in a night club, is arrested, figures in the thrilling capture of a yeggman and, being found innocent, returns to Iowa with his telephone operator bride.

== Cast ==
- Rod La Rocque as Ronald Bentley
- Ernest Torrence as John Bentley
- Dorothy Gish as Meg
- Helen Lee Worthing as Carrie Reed
- George Hackathorne as Jimmy
- Arthur Housman as Jerry
- Riley Hatch as William Workman
- Texas Guinan (uncredited)

== Preservation ==
With no prints of Night Life of New York located in any film archives, it is a lost film.
