= The Count of Luxembourg (1926 film) =

1926 film

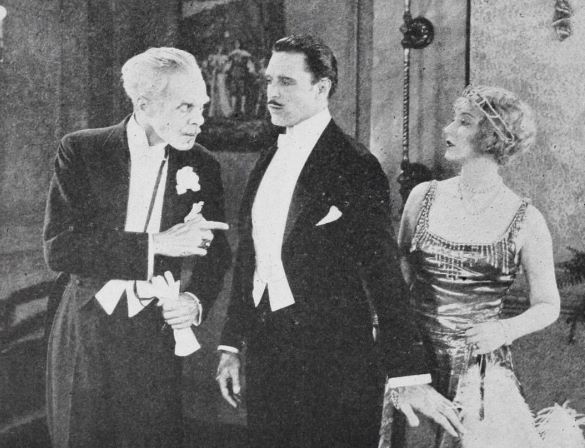
- Still with Michael Dark, George Walsh, and Helen Lee Worthing
- Directed by: Arthur Gregor
- Written by: Arthur Gregor; Jack Natteford
- Based on: The Count of Luxembourg by Franz Lehar
- Starring: George Walsh; Helen Lee Worthing; Michael Dark
- Cinematography: W. Steve Smith Jr.
- Production company: Chadwick Pictures
- Distributed by: Woolf and Freedman (UK)
- Release date: February 1, 1926
- Running time: 7 reels
- Country: United States
- Language: Silent (English intertitles)

The Count of Luxembourg is a 1926 American silent drama film directed by Arthur Gregor and starring George Walsh, Helen Lee Worthing, and Michael Dark. It is based on the plot of Franz Lehar's operetta, The Count of Luxembourg.

== Plot ==
As described in a film magazine review, Duke Rutzinoff, who cannot marry Angele Didier, the woman he loves, because she has no title, arranges for a count to marry her to give her a title, and to divorce her immediately afterward. To this offer Count Rene Duval agrees in order to obtain money for a friend. The newlyweds happen to meet after the ceremony without knowing they are married, and fall in love. The Duke denounces them for breaking the agreement, and a duel follows. The woman, learning that the Count is not a fortune hunter, but has married her for the sake of a friend, is conciliated.

== Cast ==
- George Walsh as Rene Duval
- Helen Lee Worthing as Angele Didier
- Michael Dark as Duke Rutzinoff
- Charles Requa as Secretary
- James W. Morrison as Anatole
- Joan Meredith as Yvonne

== Bibliography ==
- Goble, Alan. The Complete Index to Literary Sources in Film. Walter de Gruyter, 1999.
