= Thumbs Down (film) =

1927 silent film

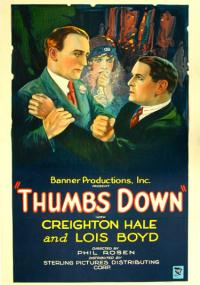
- Directed by: Phil Rosen
- Written by: Frances Guihan; Gladys Johnson
- Starring: Creighton Hale; Lois Boyd; Wyndham Standing
- Cinematography: Herbert Kirkpatrick
- Production company: Banner Productions
- Distributed by: Sterling Pictures
- Release date: June 15, 1927
- Running time: 50 minutes
- Country: United States
- Languages: Silent; English intertitles

Thumbs Down is a 1927 American silent drama film directed by Phil Rosen and starring Creighton Hale, Lois Boyd and Wyndham Standing.

== Cast ==
- Creighton Hale as Richard Hale
- Lois Boyd as Helen Stanton
- Wyndham Standing as James Breen
- Helen Lee Worthing as Marion Ames
- Vera Lewis as Mrs. Hale
- Scott Seaton as Mr. Stanton

== Bibliography ==
- Munden, Kenneth White. The American Film Institute Catalog of Motion Pictures Produced in the United States, Part 1. University of California Press, 1997.
