= Road House (1928 film) =

1928 American silent drama film

- Directed by: Richard Rosson
- Written by: Malcolm Stuart Boylan; Philip D. Hurn; John Stone
- Starring: Maria Alba; Warren Burke; Lionel Barrymore
- Cinematography: George Schneiderman
- Edited by: J. Logan Pearson
- Production company: Fox Film
- Distributed by: Fox Film
- Release date: July 25, 1928
- Running time: 60 minutes
- Country: United States
- Languages: Silent; English intertitles

Road House is a 1928 American silent drama film directed by Richard Rosson and starring Maria Alba, Warren Burke and Lionel Barrymore.

== Cast ==
- Maria Alba as Spanish Marla
- Warren Burke as Larry Grayson
- Lionel Barrymore as Henry Grayson
- Julia Swayne Gordon as Mrs. Henry Grayson
- Tempe Pigott as Grandma Grayson
- Florence Allen as Helen Grayson
- Eddie Clayton as Jim, Larry Grayson's Pal
- Jack Oakie as Sam
- Jane Keckley as Maid
- Kay Bryant as Mary, Larry's Girlfriend

== Bibliography ==
- Solomon, Aubrey. The Fox Film Corporation, 1915-1935. A History and Filmography. McFarland & Co, 2011.
