= Youcca Troubetzkoy =

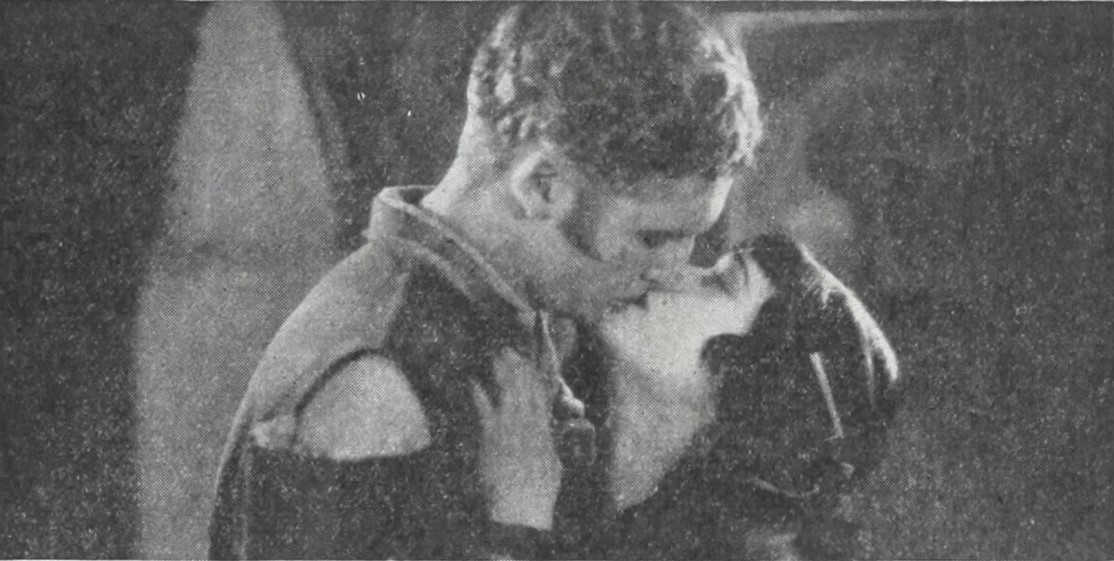
- Youcca Troubetzkoy and Pola Negri in Flower of Night (1925)
- Born: 12 December 1905; Los Angeles, California, U.S.
- Died: 22 April 1992 (aged 86); Palm Beach, Florida, U.S.
- Other names: Youcca Troubetzkov; Nicolas Barclay
- Occupation: Actor
- Years active: 1924 – 1939

Youcca Troubetzkoy (Russian: Ю́рий Никола́евич Трубецко́й; 12 December 1905 – 22 April 1992), also credited as Youcca Troubetzkov and Nicolas Barclay, was an American actor.

His brother, Prince Igor Nikolayevich Troubetzkoy, became a race car driver.

== Partial filmography ==
- Peacock Feathers (1925) as Lionel Clark
- Flower of Night (1925) as John Basset
- The Beautiful Cheat (1926) as Herbert Dangerfield
- Napoleon's Barber (1928) as French Officer
- His Glorious Night (1929) as Von Bergman
- Chasing Rainbows (1930) as Lanning
- The Virtuous Sin (1930) as Capt. Sobakin
- Abduct Me (1932) as Aga
- Cent mille francs pour un baiser (1933; as Nicolas Barclay)
- Idylle au Caire (1933) as Périclès Pietro Cochino
- Moscow Nights (1934) as Capitaine Alev
- The Concierge's Daughters (1934) as Henry Robertson
- The Red Dancer (1937)
- La Loi du nord (1939) as Ellis
- Serge Panine (1939) as Serge Panine
- Savage Brigade (1939) as Boris Mirski

== See also ==
- Amélie Rives Troubetsky
- Igor Troubetzkoy
- Tõnu Trubetsky
- Troubetzkoy
