= Svend Gade =

Danish film and theatre director (1877–1952)

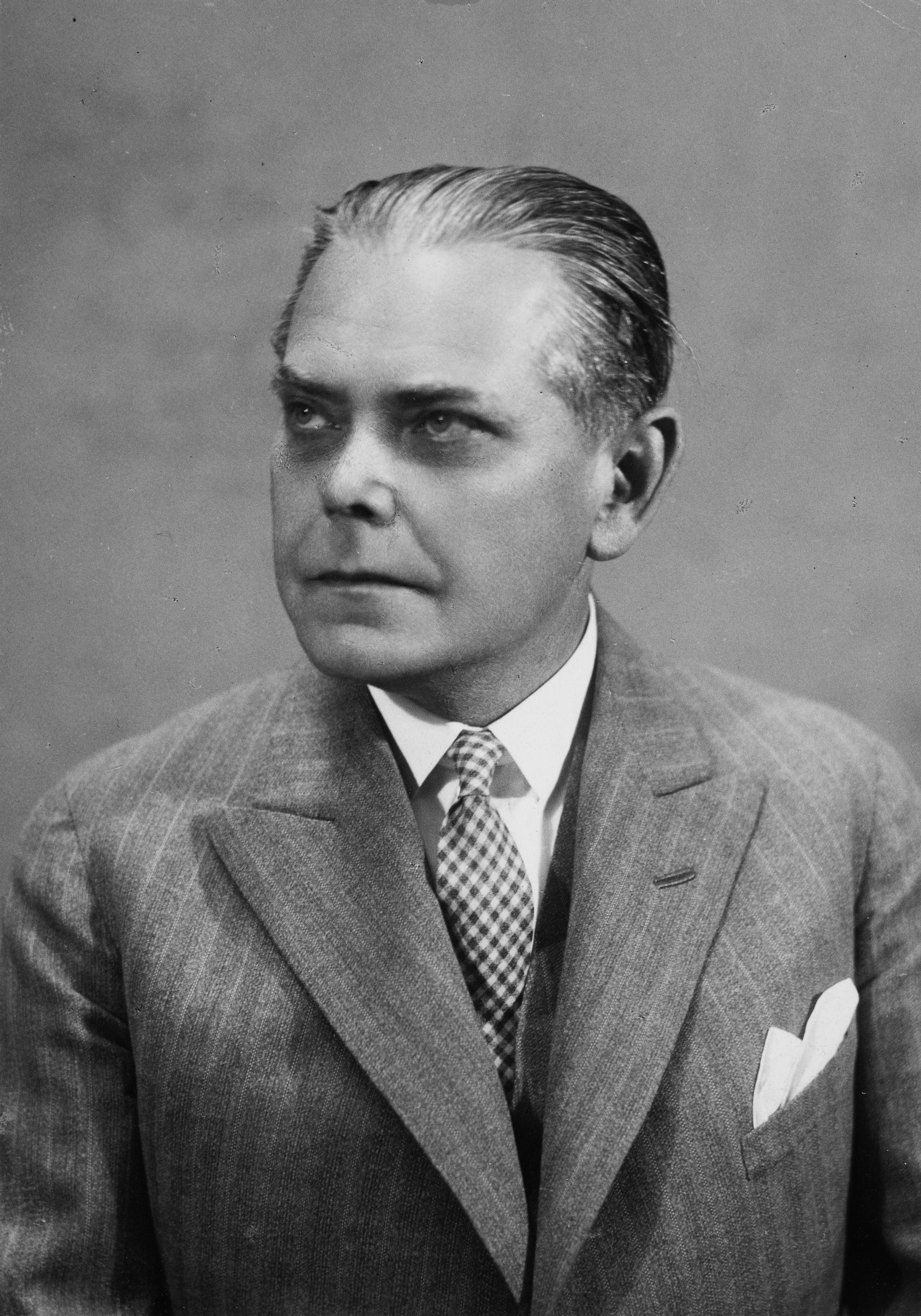
- 1940
- Born: 9 February 1877; Copenhagen, Denmark
- Died: 25 June 1952 (aged 75); Aarhus, Denmark
- Occupations: Director, Writer, Art Director
- Years active: 1913-1938 (film)

Svend Lauritz Gade (9 February 1877 – 25 June 1952) was a Danish theatre director, set designer, screenwriter and film director. He worked in America and Germany as well as his native country.

== Selected filmography ==
- The Maharaja's Favourite Wife (1917)
- Hamlet (1921)
- The Secret of Brinkenhof (1923)
- Rosita (1923)
- Three Women (1924)
- Fifth Avenue Models (1925)
- Peacock Feathers (1925)
- Siege (1925)
- The Blonde Saint (1926)
- Watch Your Wife (1926)
- Into Her Kingdom (1926)
- Jazz Mad (1928)
- The Masks of the Devil (1928)
- The Way Through the Night (1929)

== Bibliography ==
- Langman, Larry. Destination Hollywood: The Influence of Europeans on American Filmmaking. McFarland, 2000.
