= Mr. Robinson Crusoe =

1932 film by A. Edward Sutherland

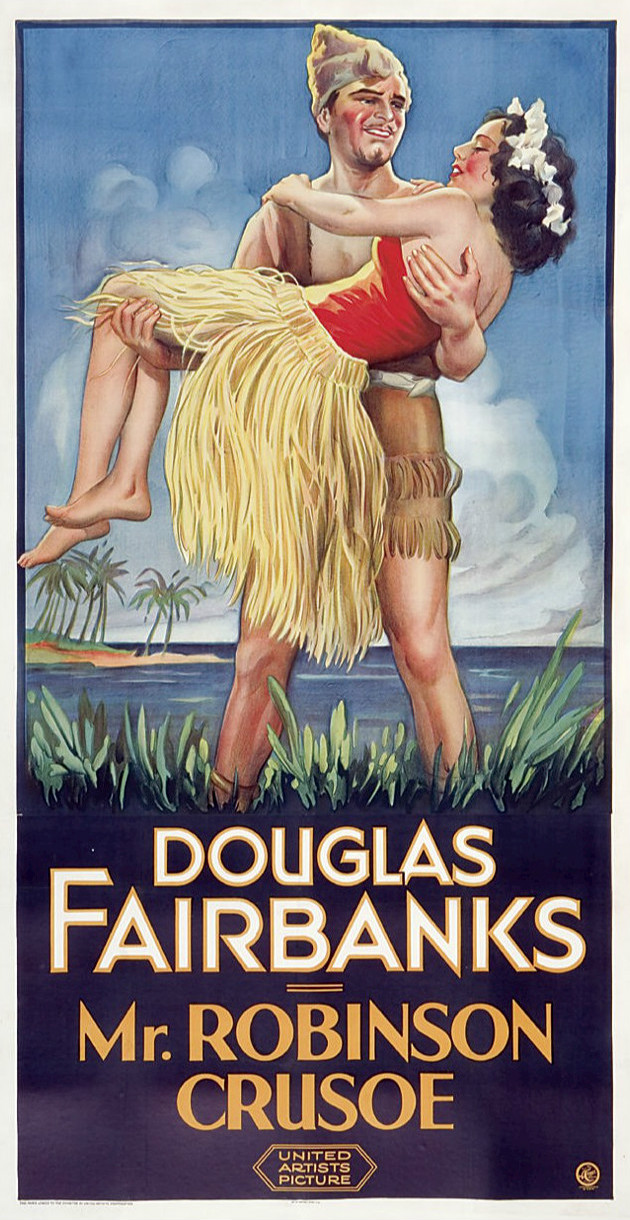
- Movie poster
- Directed by: A. Edward Sutherland
- Written by: Douglas Fairbanks (story); Thomas J. Geraghty (adaptation)
- Produced by: Douglas Fairbanks
- Cinematography: Max Dupont
- Edited by: Robert Kern
- Music by: Alfred Newman
- Distributed by: United Artists
- Release date: August 19, 1932
- Running time: 76 minutes 70 minutes (American DVD); 66 minutes (Ontario, Canada)
- Country: United States
- Language: English

Mr. Robinson Crusoe is a 1932 Pre-Code American film. It is one of the few "talkie" films starring Douglas Fairbanks, Sr., in his penultimate film role; Fairbanks also produced the film and provided the story during the Great Depression. The film was directed by A. Edward Sutherland, a veteran silent film director, for Fairbanks's Elton Productions, and released by United Artists. Steve Drexel (played by Fairbanks) shows a fiery optimism and can-do spirit that matches the Fairbanks screen persona that appears in his most popular films.

The South Seas comedy adventure featured location filming on Tahiti with working titles being Tropical Knight, A Modern Robinson Crusoe and Robinson Crusoe of the South Seas.

== Plot ==
"From the time Adam and Eve were banished from the Garden of Eden, man has vainly sought to find solace, comfort and earthly pleasures in an artificial world of his own creation. Down through the ages has come that eternal heritage of the urge in every man to turn his back on so-called civilization, to get back to nature and revel in the glories and freedom of a primitive paradise."

Steve Drexel voluntarily strands himself on a deserted island on a bet. He intends to re-create civilization (in the form of New York) and carves a comfortable home, complete with a sign reading 52nd Street and Park Avenue out of the jungle. Drexel is joined by his dog, and befriended by a native monkey, parrot, and a wild goat that is captured in one of his traps. He attempts to cultivate a "head-hunter" native as his Man Friday from Robinson Crusoe, but fails as the native escapes.

A woman runs away from a marriage she does not want on a neighboring island and is trapped in one of his devices. He names her Saturday and she becomes his love interest. Over time, she slowly learns rudimentary English.

Eventually, the natives on a nearby island attack the Fairbank's settlement at the behest of the men that bet against Drexel. The hero defeats the hostile natives just as his friends arrive and he wins the bet. Coincidental to their arrival, a separate war party of natives arrives and attacks. Drexel distracts them as his friends save his animals and head for the yacht. After a harrowing chase, he ends up escaping with his friends, animals and the girl Saturday on the yacht that brought him there. He takes her back to New York, where she performs to an appreciative crowd in the Ziegfeld Follies.

== Cast ==
- Douglas Fairbanks as Steve Drexel
- William Farnum as William Belmont
- Earle Browne as Professor Carmichale
- Maria Alba as Saturday

== Soundtrack ==
During the filming the sound equipment failed and the film had to be dubbed back in California.

Alfred Newman who had previously scored Fairbanks' Reaching for the Moon composed the score. Newman reused one of his musical themes for the 1937 film The Hurricane where it became a popular song called Moon of Manakoora. Newman's score for The Hurricane was nominated for an Academy Award.

== Legacy ==
Fairbanks biographer Jeffrey Vance writes "Mr. Robinson Crusoe, his last personal production, was designed to meet his responsibilities in the least demanding way. The film was conceived as an inexpensive travelogue masquerading as a narrative film...Free from the hated dialogue that had so confined his type of film, Fairbanks should have been in his element. And yet, despite the primarily visual aspect of the film, his customary ebullience is not in evidence; his character is a hypomanic middle-aged man."
