= Temple Bailey =

American writer

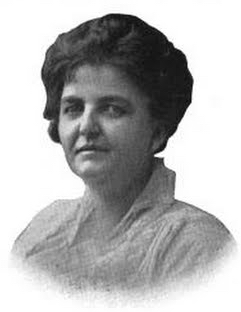
- Born: Irene Temple Bailey; February 24, 1869; Petersburg, Petersburg City, Virginia, US
- Died: July 6, 1953 (aged 84); Washington, District of Columbia, District Of Columbia, US
- Occupation: Writer (novelist)
- Writing career
- Period: 20th century
- Genres: Romance, fiction

Irene Temple Bailey (February 24, 1869 – July 6, 1953) was a popular American novelist and short story writer.

Beginning around 1902, Temple Bailey was contributing stories to national magazines such as The Saturday Evening Post, Cavalier Magazine, Cosmopolitan, The American Magazine, McClure's, Woman's Home Companion, Good Housekeeping, McCall's and others.

In 1914, Bailey wrote the screenplay for the Vitagraph Studios film Auntie, and two of her novels were filmed. She also had three of her books on the list of bestselling novels in the United States in 1918, 1922, and 1926 as determined by Publishers Weekly.

Bailey never married. She died at her apartment in Washington, D.C., on July 6, 1953. Her obituary in the New York Post estimated that her novels had sold three million copies, making her among the best paid writers in the world, and that Cosmopolitan had once given her $325,000 for three serial novels and a group of short stories.

== Bibliography ==
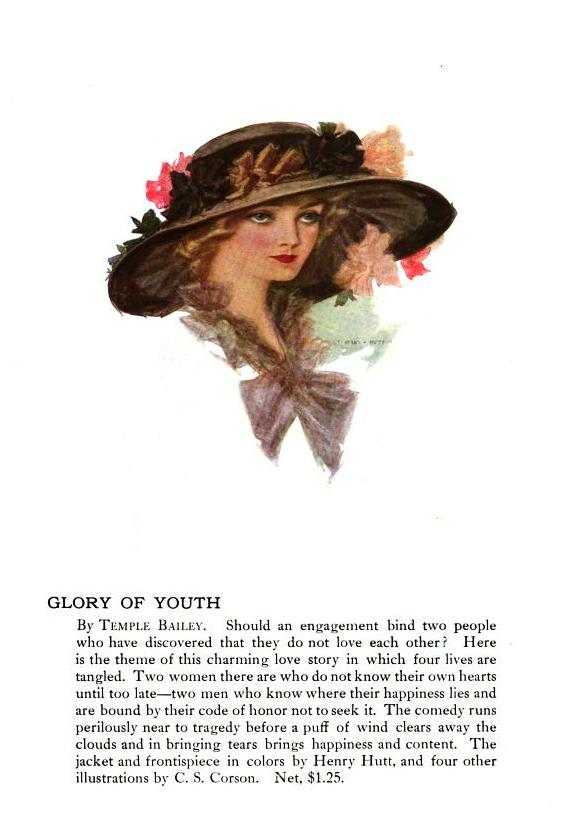
Illustration by C.S. Corson in Glory of Youth

- Judy (1907)
- Glory of Youth (1913)
- Contrary Mary (1914)
- A Girl's Courage (1916)
- Adventures in Girlhood (1917)
- Mistress Anne (1917)
- The Tin Soldier (1918) – No.8 for the year 1919 in the U.S.
- Trumpeter Swan (1920)
- The Gay Cockade (1921)
- The Dim Lantern (1922) – No.5 for the year 1923 in the U.S.
- Peacock Feathers (1924) – made into a motion picture
- Holly Hedge, and other Christmas stories (1925)
- The Blue Window (1926) – No.10 for the year 1926 in the U.S.
- Wallflowers (1927) – made into a motion picture
- Silver Slippers (1928)
- Star in the Well; a Christmas story (1928)
- Burning Beauty (1929)
- Wild Wind (1930)
- So this Is Christmas (1931)
- Little Girl Lost (1932)
- Enchanted Ground (1933)
- Radiant tree, and other stories (1934)
- Fair as the Moon (1935)
- I've Been To London (1937)
- Tomorrow's Promise (1938)
- The Blue Cloak (1941)
- Pink Camellia (1942)
- Red Fruit (1945)

== Filmography ==
- Auntie (1914)
- Peacock Feathers (1925)
- Wallflowers (1928)
