= The Secret of Brinkenhof =

1923 film

- Directed by: Svend Gade
- Written by: Josef Lauff (novel Die Brinkschulte); Svend Gade
- Produced by: Paul Ebner; Maxim Galitzenstein
- Starring: Henny Porten; Paul Henckels; Rudolf Biebrach
- Cinematography: Julius Balting; Willy Gaebel; Gerhard Rhema
- Music by: Willy Kappelt
- Production company: Maxim-Film
- Distributed by: Deulig Film
- Release date: 25 December 1923
- Country: Germany
- Languages: Silent; German intertitles

The Secret of Brinkenhof (German: Das Geheimnis von Brinkenhof) is a 1923 German silent drama film directed by Svend Gade and starring Henny Porten, Paul Henckels and Rudolf Biebrach.

The art director Heinrich Beisenherz worked with Gade on the film's sets.

== Cast ==
- Henny Porten as Maria Brinkenhof
- Paul Henckels as Jasper Brinkenhof
- Paul Manning as Anton Brinkenhof
- Alexander Wiruboff as Kardel-Fin
- Rudolf Biebrach as Jans Stedink, Schmied
- Alf Blütecher as Heinrich Örn, Schmiedegeselle
- Gertrud Eysoldt as Jungfer Eli
- Robert Leffler as Lars, Großknecht

== Bibliography ==
- Grange, William. Cultural Chronicle of the Weimar Republic. Scarecrow Press, 2008.
