= Tempe Pigott =

British actress (1869–1962)

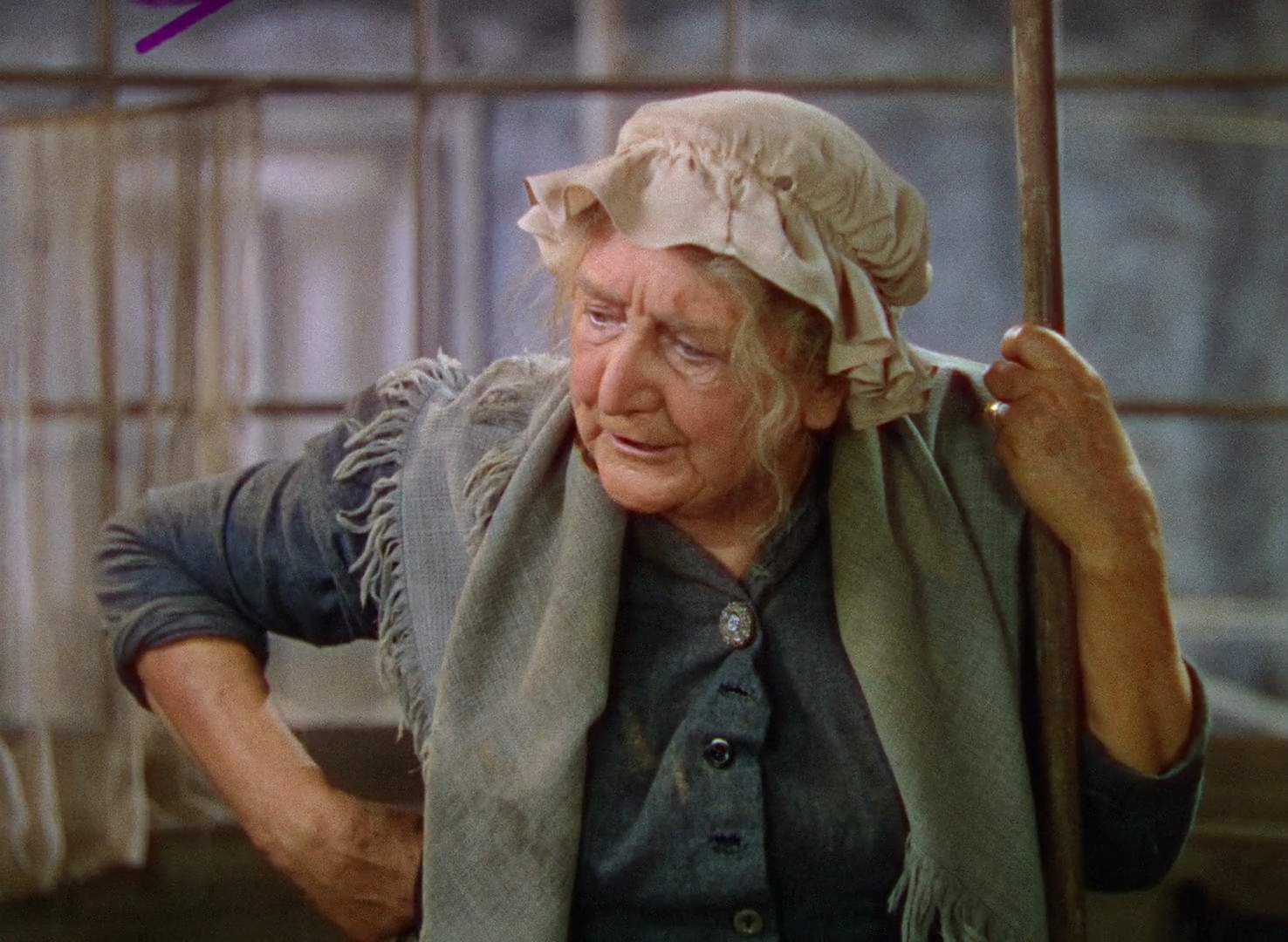
- Pigott as the charwoman in Becky Sharp (1935)
- Born: 2 February 1869; Queensland, Australia
- Died: 6 October 1962 (aged 93); Woodland Hills, California, United States
- Occupation: Actress
- Years active: 1921–1951 (films only)

Tempe Pigott (2 February 1869 – 6 October 1962) was an Australian silent and sound screen character actress. In the pre-film era she was a stage actress in England, Australia, Canada and the United States. She began appearing in motion pictures in the 1920s.

In 1907, she was a member of the Lillian Meyers Dramatic Company which toured Australia; for some years thereafter, she remained in Australia and acted in such theatrical productions as Nobody's Daughter (1911), Oscar Wilde's A Woman of No Importance (1912), and Sir Arthur Wing Pinero's His House in Order (1914). She is given one credit for her role as Mrs. Hubbard in Douglas Murray's Broadway stage play, Perkins, which starred Ruth Chatterton, and ran for 23 performances at Henry Miller's Theatre in the fall of 1918.

Her silent and sound film appearances were numerous. She is remembered mainly for playing the mother of John McTeague (Gibson Gowland) in Erich von Stroheim's Greed (1924), and as the landlady Mrs. Hawkins in Dr. Jekyll and Mr. Hyde (1931).

She died at Motion Picture Country Hospital in Woodland Hills, California, USA.

== Selected filmography ==
- The Great Impersonation (1921) as Mrs. Unthank
- The Masked Avenger (1922) as Aunt Phoebe Dyer
- Vanity Fair (1923) as Mrs. Sedley
- The Rustle of Silk (1923) as Mrs. De Breeze
- The Dawn of a Tomorrow (1924) as Ginney
- Greed (1924) as Mother McTeague
- The Narrow Street (1925) as Aunt Agnes
- Without Mercy (1925) as Madame Gordon
- The Lure of the Track (1925)
- The Black Pirate (1926) as Duenna
- The Midnight Kiss (1926) as Grandma Spencer
- Sunrise: A Song of Two Humans (1927) as Flower Seller (uncredited)
- Silk Stockings (1927) as Mrs. Gower
- Wallflowers (1928) as Mrs. Claybourne
- Road House (1928) as Grandma Grayson
- Seven Days Leave (1930) as Mrs. Haggerty
- Night Work (1930) as Flora (uncredited)
- Outward Bound (1930) as First Gossip (uncredited)
- Born to Love (1931) as Landlady (uncredited)
- Devotion (1931) as Tibby, The Cook (uncredited)
- Dr. Jekyll and Mr. Hyde (1931) as Mrs. Hawkins
- Murders in the Rue Morgue (1932) as Crone (uncredited)
- Almost Married (1932)
- American Madness (1932) as Mrs. Halligan (uncredited)
- If I Had a Million (1932) as Idylwood Resident (uncredited)
- Cavalcade (1933) as Mrs. Snapper
- Oliver Twist (1933) as Mrs. Corney
- Looking Forward (1933) as Woman Looking for Plumbing Department (uncredited)
- A Study in Scarlet (1933) as Mrs. Hudson (uncredited)
- Man of the Forest (1933) as Peg's Friend
- Doctor Bull (1933) as Grandma Banning
- If I Were Free (1933) as Mrs. Gill
- Miss Fane's Baby Is Stolen (1934) as Woman Praying In Church (uncredited)
- Long Lost Father (1934) as Mrs. Gamp, The Old Woman
- All Men Are Enemies (1934) as Tony's Housekeeper (uncredited)
- Of Human Bondage (1934) as Agnes Hollett, Phillip's Landlady (uncredited)
- One More River (1934) as Mrs. Purdy
- The Lemon Drop Kid (1934) as Old Lady (uncredited)
- Flirtation (1934) as Flower Woman (uncredited)
- Limehouse Blues (1934) as Maggie (uncredited)
- Vanessa: Her Love Story (1935) as Cake Seller at the Fair (uncredited)
- The Devil Is a Woman (1935) as Tuerta
- Bride of Frankenstein (1935) as Auntie Glutz (uncredited)
- Werewolf of London (1935) as Drunk Woman (uncredited)
- Becky Sharp (1935) as The Charwoman
- Calm Yourself (1935) as Anne 'Annie'
- A Feather in Her Hat (1935) as Katy (uncredited)
- I Found Stella Parish (1935) as Waiting Woman (uncredited)
- Kind Lady (1935) as Flower Woman (uncredited)
- A Tale of Two Cities (1935) as Old Hag (uncredited)
- The Story of Louis Pasteur (1936) as Woman (uncredited)
- Little Lord Fauntleroy (1936) as Mrs. Dibble
- Till We Meet Again (1936) as Old Woman (uncredited)
- The White Angel (1936) as Mrs. Waters, the Drunken Nurse
- Suzy (1936) as Old Woman Getting Police (uncredited)
- The Road Back (1937) as Old Woman (uncredited)
- Fools for Scandal (1938) as Bessie
- The Rage of Paris (1938) as Nicole's Landlady (uncredited)
- Confessions of a Nazi Spy (1939) as (uncredited)
- Boys' Reformatory (1939) as Mrs. Callahan
- Some Like It Hot (1939) as Flower Woman (uncredited)
- The Hunchback of Notre Dame (1939) as Madeleine (uncredited)
- The Earl of Chicago (1940) as Mrs. Oakes (uncredited)
- Waterloo Bridge (1940) as Cockney in Air-Raid Shelter (uncredited)
- Arise, My Love (1940) as Woman in Irish Pub (uncredited)
- Shining Victory (1941) as Miss Weatherby, a Patient (uncredited)
- One Foot in Heaven (1941) as Mrs. Dibble (uncredited)
- Now, Voyager (1942) as Mrs. Smith (uncredited)
- Jane Eyre (1943) as Fortune Teller (uncredited)
- The Hour Before the Dawn (1944) as Mrs. Saunders (uncredited)
- Kitty (1945) as Woman in Window (uncredited)
- Forever Amber (1947) as Midwife (uncredited)
- The Fan (1949) as Mrs. Rudge (uncredited)
- The Pilgrimage Play (1949) as (uncredited)
- Thunder on the Hill (1951) as Old Crone (uncredited) (final film role)
