= Blue Blood (1925 film) =

1925 film

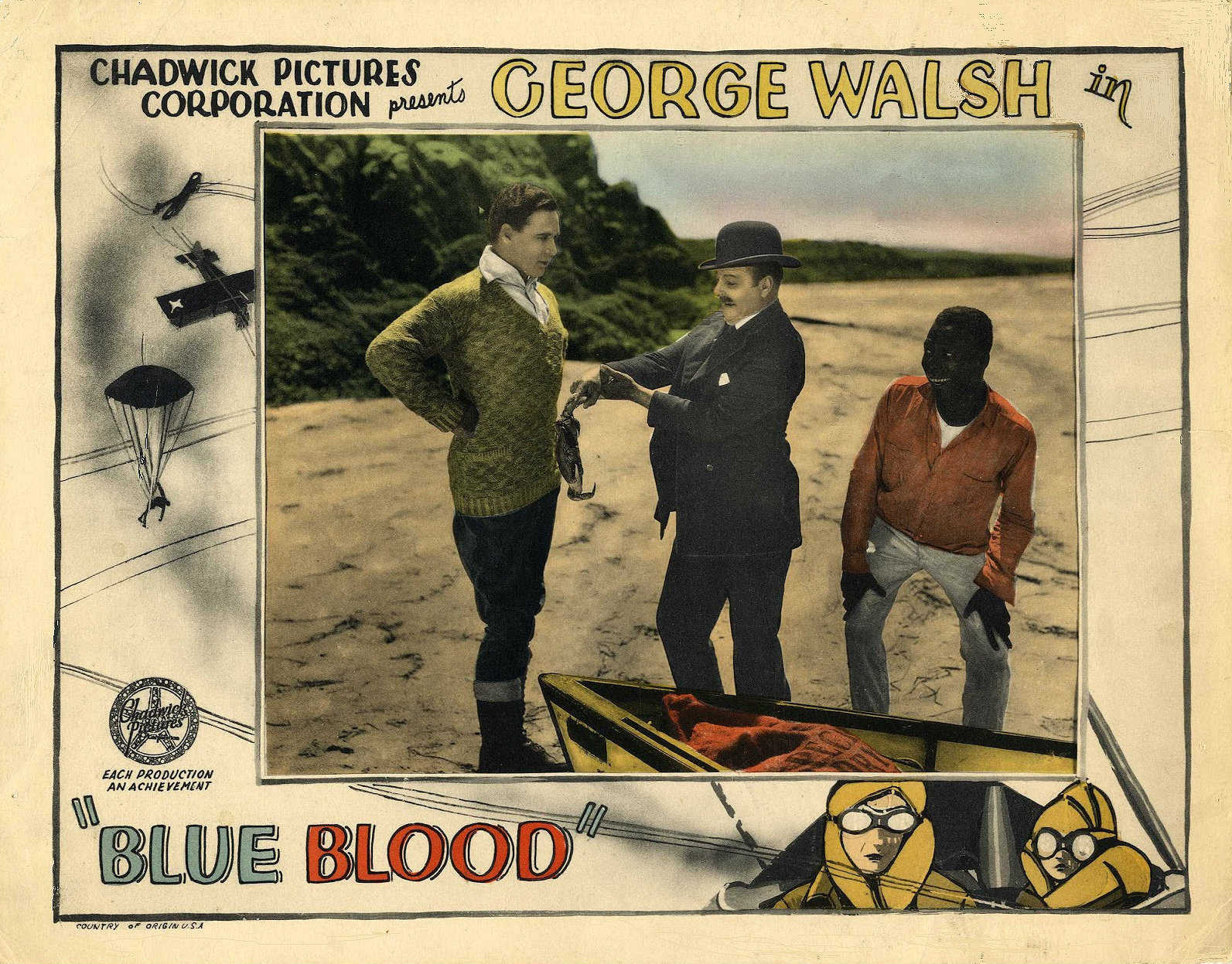
- Lobby card
- Directed by: Scott R. Dunlap
- Written by: Frank Howard Clark (story: "American Aristocracy")
- Produced by: I. E. Chadwick
- Starring: George Walsh; Philo McCullough; Cecille Evans
- Distributed by: Chadwick Pictures
- Release date: December 1, 1925
- Running time: 6 reels; 5,600 feet
- Country: United States
- Language: Silent (English intertitles)

Blue Blood is an extant 1925 American silent comedy drama film produced and distributed by Chadwick Pictures and starring George Walsh. Scott R. Dunlap directed.

== Plot ==
As described in a film magazine review, Leander Hicks wants his daughter Geraldine to marry Percy Horton, supposedly a malted milk millionaire. She refuses. At a resort Gerry falls in love with scientist Bob Chester. Then it is revealed that Horton is actually a rum-runner. His men grab Bob, mistaking him for a revenue officer, but he is able to escape. Hounded by detectives, Horton makes a getaway using a yacht with Gerry and her father onboard. Bob boards the vessel, whips Horton, and fights the crew. The police arrive in time to catch and break up the gang. The two lovers are reunited.

== Cast ==
- George Walsh as Robert Chester
- Cecille Evans as Geraldine Hicks
- Philo McCullough as Percy Horton
- Joan Meredith as Delight Burns
- Robert Bolder as Leander Hicks
- Harvey Clark as Tim Reilly
- Spencer Bell as Amos Jeenkins
- Eugene Borden as Charley Stevens

== Preservation ==
A print of Blue Blood is held by French archive Archives du Film du CNC (Bois d'Arcy).
