= Road of Hell (1931 film) =

1931 American drama film

- Spanish: Camino del infierno
- Directed by: Richard Harlan
- Written by: Edwin J. Burke; Francisco Moré de la Torre; Paul Perez
- Based on: Road of Hell by John Fleming Wilson
- Produced by: William Fox; Raoul Walsh
- Starring: Juan Torena; Maria Alba; Carlos Villarías
- Production company: Fox Film Corporation
- Distributed by: Fox Film Corporation
- Release date: February 27, 1931
- Country: United States
- Language: Spanish

Road of Hell (Spanish: Camino del infierno) is a 1931 American drama film directed by Richard Harlan and starring Juan Torena, Maria Alba and Carlos Villarías. It is the Spanish-language version of Fox Film's The Man Who Came Back (1931) based upon the play by Jules Eckert Goodman, which was in turn adapted from the novel by John Fleming Wilson. Such Multiple-language versions were common in the early years of sound film.

== Cast ==
- Juan Torena as Esteban Randolf
- Maria Alba as Angela
- Carlos Villarías as Tomás Randolf
- Ralph Navarro as Traves / Detective Harrison
- Carmen Rodríguez as Tia Isabel
- Lucio Villegas as Carlos Resling
- Juan Aristi Eulate as Capt. Garlon
- Ramón Peón
- Virginia Ruiz
